= Lensvik Municipality =

Former municipality in Trøndelag, Norway

Lensvik Municipality Lensvik herred
- Former municipality
- Lensviken herred (historic name)
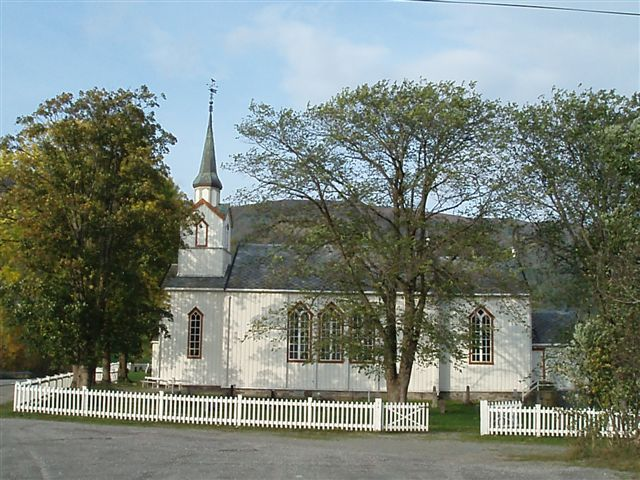
- View of the local church

- Sør-Trøndelag within Norway

- Lensvik within Sør-Trøndelag
- Coordinates: 63.5130°N 09.8087°E
- Country: Norway
- County: Sør-Trøndelag
- District: Fosen
- Established: 1 Jan 1905
  - Preceded by: Rissa Municipality
- Disestablished: 1 Jan 1964
  - Succeeded by: Agdenes Municipality
- Administrative centre: Lensvik

Government
  - Mayor (1952–1963): Arne Utnes (Sp)

Area (upon dissolution)
  - Total: 170.9 km^{2} (66.0 sq mi)
  - Rank: #410 in Norway
- Highest elevation: 656.2 m (2,153 ft)

Population (1963)
  - Total: 1,134
  - Rank: #593 in Norway
  - Density: 6.6/km^{2} (17/sq mi)
  - Change (10 years): ▲ +2%
- Demonym: Lensvikbygg

Official language
  - Norwegian form: Bokmål
- Time zone: UTC+01:00 (CET)
  - Summer (DST): UTC+02:00 (CEST)
- ISO 3166 code: NO-1623

Lensvik is a former municipality in the old Sør-Trøndelag county in Norway. The 171-square-kilometre (66 sq mi) municipality existed from 1905 until its dissolution in 1964. The municipality was located along the western shore of the Trondheimsfjorden and it encompassed the central part of what is now Orkland Municipality in Trøndelag county. The administrative centre was the village of Lensvik where the Lensvik Church is located.

Prior to its dissolution in 1964, the 171-square-kilometre (66 sq mi) municipality was the 410th largest by area out of the 689 municipalities in Norway. Lensvik Municipality was the 689th most populous municipality in Norway with a population of about 1,134. The municipality's population density was 6.6 inhabitants per square kilometre (17/sq mi) and its population had increased by 2% over the previous 10-year period.

== General information ==
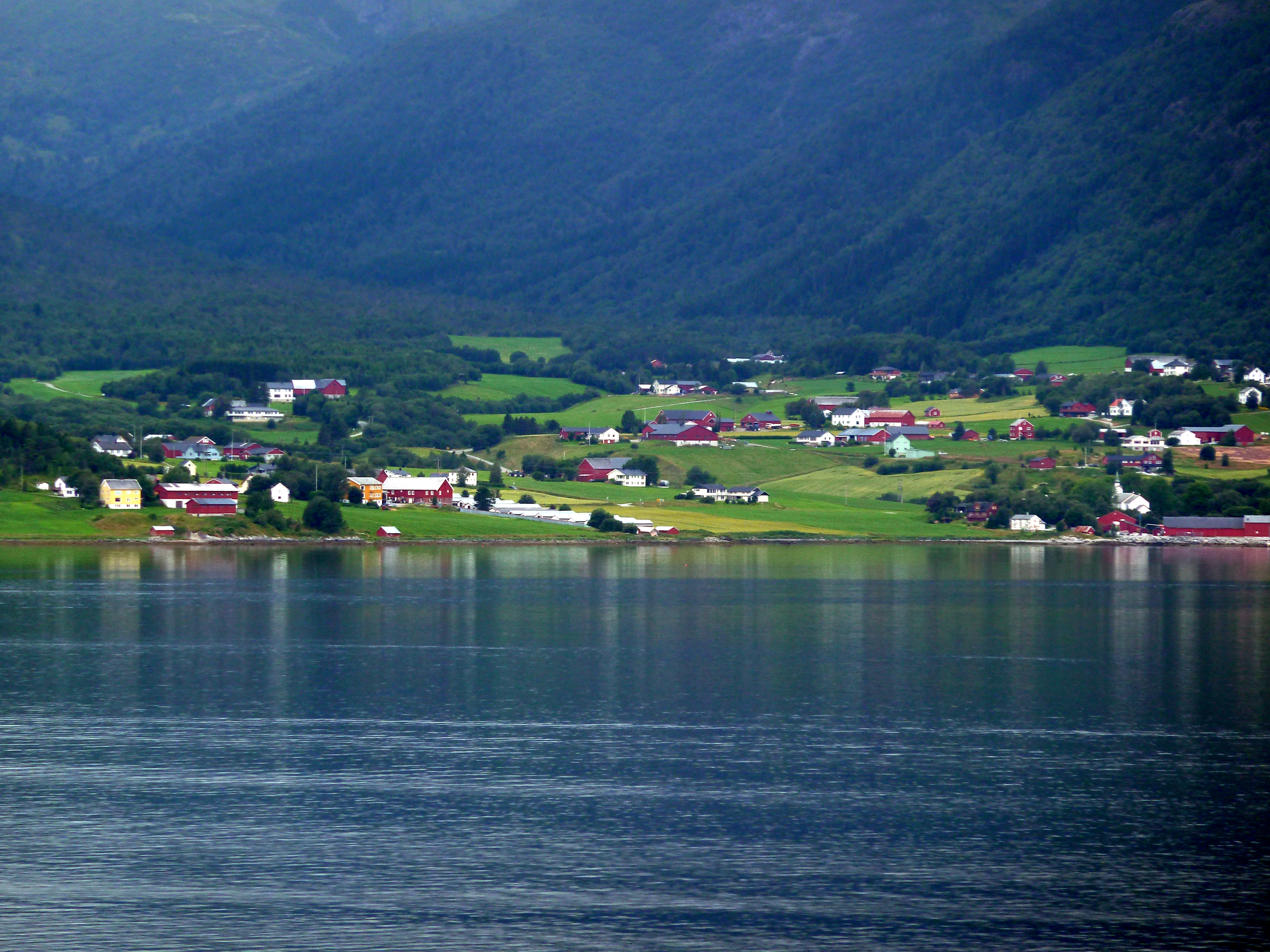
View of the village of Lensvik

The municipality of Lensvik was established on 1 January 1905 when it was separated from the large Rissa Municipality which originally spanned both sides of the Trondheimsfjorden. The separation left Lensvik Municipality (population: 1,019) on the west side of the fjord and the remainder of Rissa Municipality on the east side of the fjord.

During the 1960s, there were many municipal mergers across Norway due to the work of the Schei Committee. On 1 January 1964, Lensvik Municipality (population: 1,136) was merged with the eastern part of Agdenes Municipality (population: 858) and the Ingdalen district of Stadsbygd Municipality to form a new, larger Agdenes Municipality.

=== Name ===
The municipality is named after the old village of Lensvik Old Norse: Leiðangrsvík. The Old Norse name was simplified and shortened to Lensvik over the course of several centuries. The first element of the old name is leið which means "water course". The second element is angr which means "narrow fjord". The last element is vík which means "bay". Thus, this village name describes a place along a small bay along the main entrance to the vast Trondheimsfjorden, which in this area is a narrow fjord that is the main watercourse or pathway inland. Historically, the name of the municipality was spelled Lensviken. On 3 November 1917, a royal resolution changed the spelling of the name of the municipality to Lensvik, removing the definite form ending -en.

=== Churches ===
The Church of Norway had one parish (sokn) within Lensvik Municipality. At the time of the municipal dissolution, it was part of the Stadsbygd prestegjeld and the Nord-Fosen prosti (deanery) in the Diocese of Nidaros.

Churches in Lensvik Municipality
Parish (sokn)	Church name	Location of the church	Year built
Lensvik	Lensvik Church	Lensvik	1863

== Geography ==
The municipality was located on the southwest side of the Trondheimsfjorden, about 35 kilometres (22 mi) west of the city of Trondheim. Agdenes Municipality was located to the north, Heim Municipality and Snillfjord Municipality were to the west, and Stadsbygd Municipality was to the south. Rissa Municipality was located to the east on the other side of the fjord. The highest point in the municipality was the 656.2-metre (2,153 ft) tall mountain Hestgrovheia, just west of the village of Lensvik.

== Government ==
While it existed, Lensvik Municipality was responsible for primary education (through 10th grade), outpatient health services, senior citizen services, welfare and other social services, zoning, economic development, and municipal roads and utilities. The municipality was governed by a municipal council of directly elected representatives. The mayor was indirectly elected by a vote of the municipal council. The municipality was under the jurisdiction of the Frostating Court of Appeal.

=== Municipal council ===
The municipal council (Herredsstyre) of Lensvik Municipality was made up of 13 representatives that were elected to four year terms. The tables below show the historical composition of the council by political party.

Lensvik herredsstyre 1959–1963
Party name (in Norwegian)	Number of representatives
Labour Party (Arbeiderpartiet)	2
Conservative Party (Høyre)	1
Christian Democratic Party (Kristelig Folkeparti)	2
Centre Party (Senterpartiet)	4
Local List(s) (Lokale lister)	4
Total number of members:	13

Lensvik herredsstyre 1955–1959
Party name (in Norwegian)	Number of representatives
Labour Party (Arbeiderpartiet)	2
Conservative Party (Høyre)	2
Christian Democratic Party (Kristelig Folkeparti)	2
Farmers' Party (Bondepartiet)	4
Local List(s) (Lokale lister)	3
Total number of members:	13

Lensvik herredsstyre 1951–1955
Party name (in Norwegian)	Number of representatives
Labour Party (Arbeiderpartiet)	1
Conservative Party (Høyre)	1
Christian Democratic Party (Kristelig Folkeparti)	2
Farmers' Party (Bondepartiet)	3
Local List(s) (Lokale lister)	5
Total number of members:	12

Lensvik herredsstyre 1947–1951
Party name (in Norwegian)	Number of representatives
Labour Party (Arbeiderpartiet)	2
Conservative Party (Høyre)	1
Christian Democratic Party (Kristelig Folkeparti)	3
Farmers' Party (Bondepartiet)	2
Liberal Party (Venstre)	1
Local List(s) (Lokale lister)	3
Total number of members:	12

Lensvik herredsstyre 1945–1947
Party name (in Norwegian)	Number of representatives
Labour Party (Arbeiderpartiet)	2
Conservative Party (Høyre)	1
Farmers' Party (Bondepartiet)	2
Liberal Party (Venstre)	1
Local List(s) (Lokale lister)	6
Total number of members:	12

Lensvik herredsstyre 1937–1941*
Party name (in Norwegian)	Number of representatives
Labour Party (Arbeiderpartiet)	3
Conservative Party (Høyre)	1
Farmers' Party (Bondepartiet)	5
Liberal Party (Venstre)	1
Local List(s) (Lokale lister)	2
Total number of members:	12
Note: Due to the German occupation of Norway during World War II, no elections were held for new municipal councils until after the war ended in 1945.

=== Mayors ===
The mayor (Norwegian: ordfører) of Lensvik Municipality was the political leader of the municipality and the chairperson of the municipal council. Here is a list of people who held this position:

- 1905–1913: Ole Nilsen Tøndel (H)
- 1914–1925: Edvard Udnæs (Bp)
- 1926–1928: Ole J. Ofstad (Bp)
- 1928–1940: John J. Selbæk (Bp)
- 1941–1941: Johan P. Indergård (NS)
- 1942–1945: Arne Utnes (NS)
- 1945–1945: John J. Selbæk (Bp)
- 1946–1947: Nils Tøndel (KrF)
- 1948–1951: Johan P. Indergård (KrF)
- 1952–1963: Arne Utnes (Bp)

== See also ==
- List of former municipalities of Norway
