= Orkdal Municipality =

Former municipality in Trøndelag, Norway

Orkdal Municipality Orkdal kommune
- Former municipality
- Orkedal herred (historic name); Orkedalen herred (historic name)
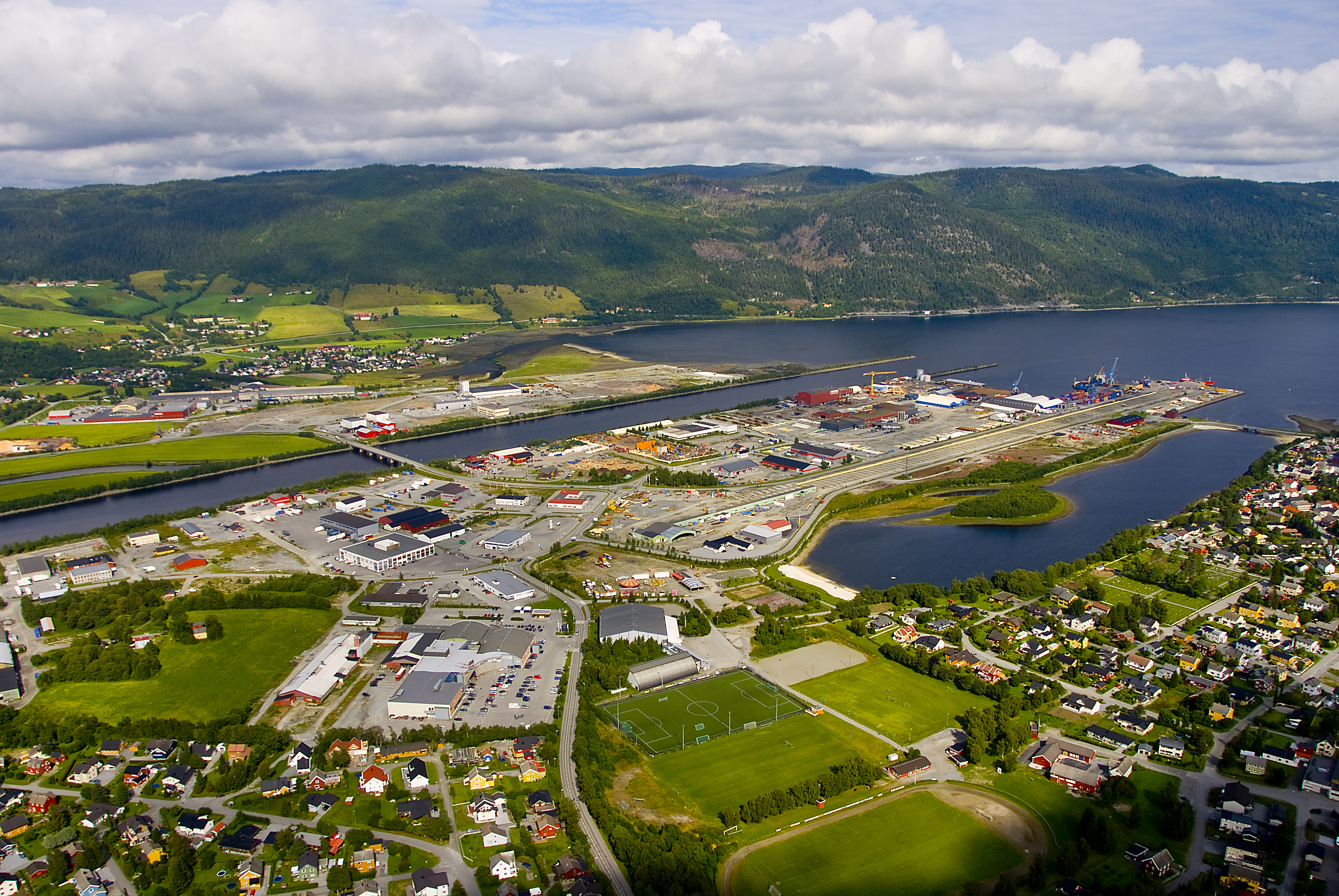
- View of Orkanger

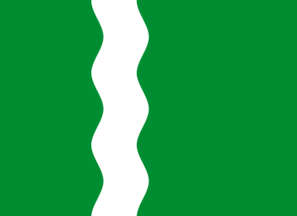
- Flag Coat of arms

- Trøndelag within Norway

- Orkdal within Trøndelag
- Coordinates: 63°17′20″N 09°43′34″E
- Country: Norway
- County: Trøndelag
- District: Orkdalen
- Established: 1 Jan 1838
  - Created as: Formannskapsdistrikt
- Disestablished: 1 Jan 2020
  - Succeeded by: Orkland Municipality
- Administrative centre: Orkanger

Government
  - Mayor (2015–2019): Oddbjørn Bang (Sp)

Area (upon dissolution)
  - Total: 594.30 km^{2} (229.46 sq mi)
  - Land: 564.46 km^{2} (217.94 sq mi)
  - Water: 29.84 km^{2} (11.52 sq mi) 5%
  - Rank: #188 in Norway
- Highest elevation: 846.7 m (2,778 ft)

Population (2019)
  - Total: 12,086
  - Rank: #96 in Norway
  - Density: 20.3/km^{2} (53/sq mi)
  - Change (10 years): ▲ +8.3%
- Demonym: Orkdaling

Official language
  - Norwegian form: Neutral
- Time zone: UTC+01:00 (CET)
  - Summer (DST): UTC+02:00 (CEST)
- ISO 3166 code: NO-5024

Orkdal is a former municipality in Trøndelag county, Norway. The municipality existed from 1838 until its dissolution in 2020 when it joined Orkland Municipality. It was part of the Orkdalen region. The administrative centre of the municipality was the city of Orkanger. Some of the notable villages in the municipality included Kjøra, Geitastrand, Gjølme, Thamshavn, Fannrem, Vormstad, Svorkmo, and Hoston.

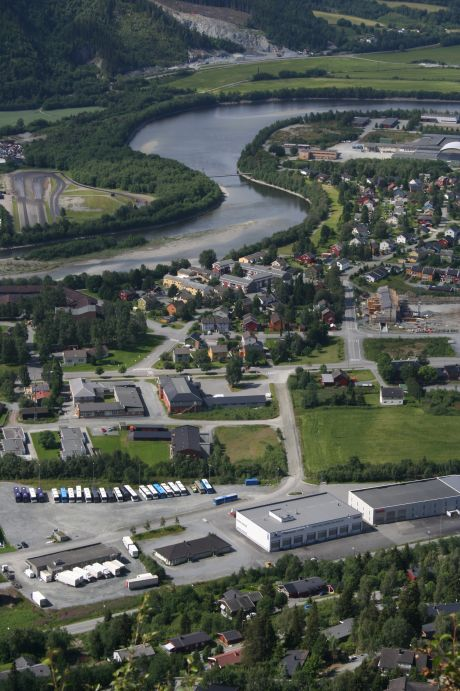
Orkanger with the Orkla river

At the time of its dissolution in 2020, the 594-square-kilometre (229 sq mi) municipality was the 188th largest by area out of the 422 municipalities in Norway. Orkdal Municipality was the 96th most populous municipality in Norway with a population of 12,086. The municipality's population density was 20.3 inhabitants per square kilometre (53/sq mi) and its population had increased by 8.3% over the previous 10-year period.

Agriculture played a significant role in the municipality. The Thamshavnbanen was used to transport ore from Løkken Verk to the port of Thamshavn, and it is now a vintage railway. The Fannrem concentration camp was located in Fannrem during World War II. Orkanger is one of the main industrial hubs in central Norway. The industry was mainly located around Grønøra Industrial park. The largest companies are Technip Offshore Norge AS, Reinertsen, Washington Mills, and Elkem Thamshavn AS.

== General information ==
The parish of Orkdal was established as a municipality on 1 January 1838 (see formannskapsdistrikt law). On 1 July 1920, Orkdal Municipality was divided into three separate municipalities: the 7-square-kilometre (2.7 sq mi) northern port area (population: 1,715) became Orkanger Municipality, the southern district of Orkdal (population: 1,760) became Orkland Municipality, and the central areas (population: 3,045) remained as Orkdal Municipality.

During the 1960s, there were many municipal mergers across Norway due to the work of the Schei Committee. On 1 January 1963, Orkdal Municipality (population: 4,152) was merged with Orkanger Municipality (population: 2,874), Orkland Municipality (population: 1,707), and Geitastrand Municipality (population: 559) to form a new, larger Orkdal Municipality.

On 1 January 2018, the municipality switched from the old Sør-Trøndelag county to the new Trøndelag county.

On 1 January 2020, the neighboring Agdenes Municipality, Orkdal Municipality, and Meldal Municipality, plus the majority of Snillfjord Municipality were merged to form the new Orkland Municipality.

=== Name ===
The municipality (originally the parish) is named after the Orkdalen valley (Old Norse: Orkardalr) since the first Orkdal Church was built there. The first element is the genitive case of the name of the river Ork (now called Orklaelva). The last element is dalr which means "valley" or "dale". Historically, the name of the municipality was spelled Orkedalen. On 3 November 1917, a royal resolution changed the spelling of the name of the municipality to Orkedal, removing the definite form ending -en. On 12 December 1919, a royal resolution changed the spelling of the name of the municipality to Orkdal.

=== Coat of arms ===
The coat of arms was granted on 25 April 1986 and it was used until 1 January 2020 when the municipality was dissolved. The official blazon is "Vert, a pallet wavy argent" (Norwegian: I grønt en smal sølv stolpe dannet ved bølgesnitt). This means the arms have a green field (background) and the charge is a vertical wavy bar. The wavy line has a tincture of argent which means it is commonly colored white, but if it is made out of metal, then silver is used. The design was chosen to symbolize the river Orklaelva which runs through fertile Orkdalen valley throughout the municipality. The arms are also a canting because the name of the municipality is derived from the name of the river. The arms were designed by Einar H. Skjervold. The municipal flag has the same design as the coat of arms.

=== Churches ===
The Church of Norway had four parishes (sokn) within Orkdal Municipality. It is part of the Orkdal prosti (deanery) in the Diocese of Nidaros.

Churches in Orkdal Municipality
Parish (sokn)	Church name	Location of the church	Year built
Geitastrand	Geitastrand Church	Geitastrand	1859
Orkanger	Orkanger Church	Orkanger	1892
Orkdal	Orkdal Church	Fannrem	1893
Orkdal	Søvasskjølen Church	Svorksjødalen	1981
Orkland	Moe Church	Vormstad	1867

== Government ==
While it existed, Orkdal Municipality was responsible for primary education (through 10th grade), outpatient health services, senior citizen services, welfare and other social services, zoning, economic development, and municipal roads and utilities. The municipality was governed by a municipal council of directly elected representatives. The mayor was indirectly elected by a vote of the municipal council. The municipality was under the jurisdiction of the Sør-Trøndelag District Court and the Frostating Court of Appeal. Waste management was from 1995 handled by the inter-municipal agency HAMOS Forvaltning.

=== Municipal council ===
The municipal council (Kommunestyre) of Orkdal Municipality is made up of 35 representatives that are elected to four-year terms. The tables below show the historical composition of the council by political party.

Orkdal kommunestyre 2015–2019
Party name (in Norwegian)	Number of representatives
Labour Party (Arbeiderpartiet)	10
Progress Party (Fremskrittspartiet)	1
Conservative Party (Høyre)	2
Christian Democratic Party (Kristelig Folkeparti)	1
Pensioners' Party (Pensjonistpartiet)	2
Centre Party (Senterpartiet)	7
Socialist Left Party (Sosialistisk Venstreparti)	1
Liberal Party (Venstre)	2
Orkdal List (Orkdalslista)	5
Small Town List Orkdal (Småbylista Orkdal)	4
Total number of members:	35

Orkdal kommunestyre 2011–2015
Party name (in Norwegian)	Number of representatives
Labour Party (Arbeiderpartiet)	9
Progress Party (Fremskrittspartiet)	2
Conservative Party (Høyre)	2
Christian Democratic Party (Kristelig Folkeparti)	2
Centre Party (Senterpartiet)	5
Socialist Left Party (Sosialistisk Venstreparti)	1
Liberal Party (Venstre)	3
Orkdal List (Orkdalslista)	9
Small Town List Orkdal (Småbylista Orkdal)	2
Total number of members:	35

Orkdal kommunestyre 2007–2011
Party name (in Norwegian)	Number of representatives
Labour Party (Arbeiderpartiet)	12
Progress Party (Fremskrittspartiet)	4
Conservative Party (Høyre)	1
Christian Democratic Party (Kristelig Folkeparti)	2
Centre Party (Senterpartiet)	5
Socialist Left Party (Sosialistisk Venstreparti)	1
Liberal Party (Venstre)	3
Orkdal List (Orkdalslista)	7
Total number of members:	35

Orkdal kommunestyre 2003–2007
Party name (in Norwegian)	Number of representatives
Labour Party (Arbeiderpartiet)	9
Progress Party (Fremskrittspartiet)	4
Conservative Party (Høyre)	1
Christian Democratic Party (Kristelig Folkeparti)	2
Centre Party (Senterpartiet)	5
Socialist Left Party (Sosialistisk Venstreparti)	3
Liberal Party (Venstre)	5
Orkdal List (Orkdalslista)	6
Total number of members:	35

Orkdal kommunestyre 1999–2003
Party name (in Norwegian)	Number of representatives
Labour Party (Arbeiderpartiet)	14
Progress Party (Fremskrittspartiet)	3
Conservative Party (Høyre)	2
Christian Democratic Party (Kristelig Folkeparti)	4
Centre Party (Senterpartiet)	6
Socialist Left Party (Sosialistisk Venstreparti)	2
Liberal Party (Venstre)	8
Orkdal List (Orkdallista)	6
Total number of members:	45

Orkdal kommunestyre 1995–1999
Party name (in Norwegian)	Number of representatives
Labour Party (Arbeiderpartiet)	14
Conservative Party (Høyre)	3
Christian Democratic Party (Kristelig Folkeparti)	4
Centre Party (Senterpartiet)	9
Socialist Left Party (Sosialistisk Venstreparti)	2
Liberal Party (Venstre)	7
Orkdal List (Orkdalslista)	6
Total number of members:	45

Orkdal kommunestyre 1991–1995
Party name (in Norwegian)	Number of representatives
Labour Party (Arbeiderpartiet)	13
Progress Party (Fremskrittspartiet)	2
Conservative Party (Høyre)	4
Christian Democratic Party (Kristelig Folkeparti)	4
Centre Party (Senterpartiet)	9
Socialist Left Party (Sosialistisk Venstreparti)	6
Liberal Party (Venstre)	7
Total number of members:	45

Orkdal kommunestyre 1987–1991
Party name (in Norwegian)	Number of representatives
Labour Party (Arbeiderpartiet)	19
Progress Party (Fremskrittspartiet)	2
Conservative Party (Høyre)	6
Christian Democratic Party (Kristelig Folkeparti)	4
Centre Party (Senterpartiet)	6
Socialist Left Party (Sosialistisk Venstreparti)	3
Liberal Party (Venstre)	5
Total number of members:	45

Orkdal kommunestyre 1983–1987
Party name (in Norwegian)	Number of representatives
Labour Party (Arbeiderpartiet)	21
Progress Party (Fremskrittspartiet)	1
Conservative Party (Høyre)	6
Christian Democratic Party (Kristelig Folkeparti)	6
Centre Party (Senterpartiet)	6
Socialist Left Party (Sosialistisk Venstreparti)	2
Liberal Party (Venstre)	3
Total number of members:	45

Orkdal kommunestyre 1979–1983
Party name (in Norwegian)	Number of representatives
Labour Party (Arbeiderpartiet)	20
Conservative Party (Høyre)	7
Christian Democratic Party (Kristelig Folkeparti)	5
Centre Party (Senterpartiet)	8
Liberal Party (Venstre)	4
Joint list of the Socialist Left Party (Sosialistisk Venstreparti) and the Communist Party (Kommunistiske Parti)	1
Total number of members:	45

Orkdal kommunestyre 1975–1979
Party name (in Norwegian)	Number of representatives
Labour Party (Arbeiderpartiet)	20
Conservative Party (Høyre)	4
Christian Democratic Party (Kristelig Folkeparti)	5
New People's Party (Nye Folkepartiet)	1
Centre Party (Senterpartiet)	9
Socialist Left Party (Sosialistisk Venstreparti)	3
Liberal Party (Venstre)	3
Total number of members:	45

Orkdal kommunestyre 1971–1975
Party name (in Norwegian)	Number of representatives
Labour Party (Arbeiderpartiet)	21
Conservative Party (Høyre)	2
Christian Democratic Party (Kristelig Folkeparti)	4
Centre Party (Senterpartiet)	10
Liberal Party (Venstre)	5
Socialist common list (Venstresosialistiske felleslister)	3
Total number of members:	45

Orkdal kommunestyre 1967–1971
Party name (in Norwegian)	Number of representatives
Labour Party (Arbeiderpartiet)	21
Conservative Party (Høyre)	3
Communist Party (Kommunistiske Parti)	1
Christian Democratic Party (Kristelig Folkeparti)	4
Centre Party (Senterpartiet)	9
Socialist People's Party (Sosialistisk Folkeparti)	1
Liberal Party (Venstre)	6
Total number of members:	45

Orkdal kommunestyre 1963–1967
Party name (in Norwegian)	Number of representatives
Labour Party (Arbeiderpartiet)	22
Conservative Party (Høyre)	3
Communist Party (Kommunistiske Parti)	2
Christian Democratic Party (Kristelig Folkeparti)	4
Centre Party (Senterpartiet)	8
Liberal Party (Venstre)	6
Total number of members:	45

Orkdal herredsstyre 1959–1963
Party name (in Norwegian)	Number of representatives
Labour Party (Arbeiderpartiet)	6
Christian Democratic Party (Kristelig Folkeparti)	3
Centre Party (Senterpartiet)	5
Liberal Party (Venstre)	3
Total number of members:	17

Orkdal herredsstyre 1955–1959
Party name (in Norwegian)	Number of representatives
Labour Party (Arbeiderpartiet)	7
Christian Democratic Party (Kristelig Folkeparti)	2
Farmers' Party (Bondepartiet)	4
Liberal Party (Venstre)	3
Local List(s) (Lokale lister)	1
Total number of members:	17

Orkdal herredsstyre 1951–1955
Party name (in Norwegian)	Number of representatives
Labour Party (Arbeiderpartiet)	6
Christian Democratic Party (Kristelig Folkeparti)	2
Farmers' Party (Bondepartiet)	4
Liberal Party (Venstre)	4
Total number of members:	16

Orkdal herredsstyre 1947–1951
Party name (in Norwegian)	Number of representatives
Labour Party (Arbeiderpartiet)	5
Christian Democratic Party (Kristelig Folkeparti)	2
Farmers' Party (Bondepartiet)	4
Liberal Party (Venstre)	5
Total number of members:	16

Orkdal herredsstyre 1945–1947
Party name (in Norwegian)	Number of representatives
Labour Party (Arbeiderpartiet)	9
Christian Democratic Party (Kristelig Folkeparti)	3
Farmers' Party (Bondepartiet)	4
Liberal Party (Venstre)	8
Total number of members:	24

Orkdal herredsstyre 1937–1941*
Party name (in Norwegian)	Number of representatives
Labour Party (Arbeiderpartiet)	9
Farmers' Party (Bondepartiet)	5
Liberal Party (Venstre)	10
Total number of members:	24
Note: Due to the German occupation of Norway during World War II, no elections were held for new municipal councils until after the war ended in 1945.

=== Mayors ===
The mayor (Norwegian: ordfører) of Orkdal Municipality was the political leader of the municipality and the chairperson of the municipal council. Here is a list of people who held this position:

- 1838–1842: Johan Fredrik Roshauw
- 1842–1843: Niels Finckenhagen
- 1844–1847: Johan Fredrik Roshauw
- 1848–1851: Andreas Lee Bull
- 1852–1855: Christen Anderssen Rømme
- 1856–1863: Andreas Lee Bull
- 1864–1865: H.P. Dahl
- 1866–1869: Christen Anderssen Rømme
- 1870–1889: Johan Richter (H)
- 1890–1895: Lars Garberg (V)
- 1896–1898: Ole Kvam (V)
- 1899–1901: Lars Garberg (V)
- 1902–1916: John Iversen Wolden (V)
- 1917–1919: Ole T. Hongslo (V)
- 1920–1937: Ingebrigt I. Ustad (V)
- 1938–1940: Erik Leland (V)
- 1941–1941: Sigurd Garberg (V)
- 1941–1944: Johannes Svendsen (NS)
- 1944–1945: Asbjørn Hofstad (LL)
- 1945–1945: Erik Leland (V)
- 1946–1947: Sigurd Garberg (V)
- 1948–1951: Nils Jerpstad (Bp)
- 1952–1959: Olav Ansnes (V)
- 1960–1962: Nils Jerpstad (Sp)
- 1963–1963: Sverre Solligård (Ap)
- 1964–1968: Kolbjørn Larsen (Ap)
- 1968–1975: Ingrid Sandvik (Ap)
- 1976–1979: Rasmus Skålholt (Ap)
- 1979–1983: Kåre Gjønnes (KrF)
- 1984–1987: Rudolf Larsen (Ap)
- 1987–1987: Jorunn Wormdahl Asbøll (Ap)
- 1988–1989: Elling Kvernmo (Sp)
- 1990–1991: Harald Bugge (H)
- 1992–1995: Elling Kvernmo (Sp)
- 1995–1999: Arne Grønset (V)
- 1999–2015: Gunnar Lysholm (LL)
- 2015–2019: Oddbjørn Bang (Sp)

== Geography ==
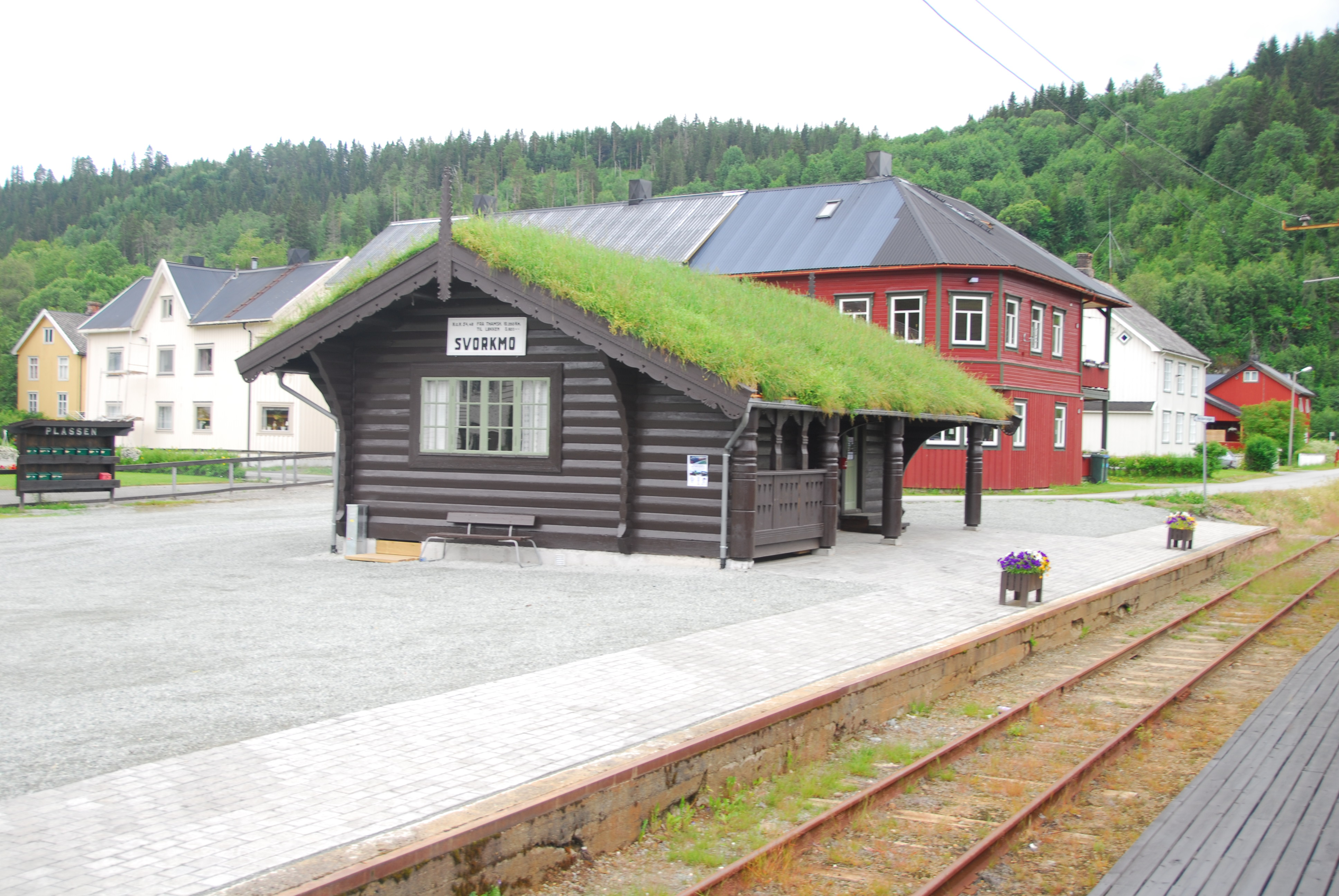
Svorkmo Station, Orkdal

A large part of the population was concentrated in the Orkanger/Fannrem area, which is situated at the head of the Orkdalsfjord, a branch of the large Trondheimsfjord. The Orkla River, one of the better salmon rivers in Norway, meets the sea at Orkanger.

The lakes Hostovatnet, Gangåsvatnet, Våvatnet and Svorksjøen were located around the municipality. The highest point in the municipality was the 846.7-metre (2,778 ft) tall mountain Omnfjellvarden, in the western part of the municipality, near the border with Hemne Municipality.

Agdenes Municipality, Snillfjord Municipality and Hemne Municipality were located to the northwest, Rindal Municipality and Meldal Municipality were to the south, and Melhus Municipality and Skaun Municipality were to the east, and Trondheim Municipality and Indre Fosen Municipality were to the northeast across the Trondheimsfjord.

== Notable people ==
- Johan Bojer, an author
- Viktor Durasovic, a professional tennis player
- Nils Arne Eggen, the former coach of Rosenborg BK
- Roar Ljøkelsøy, a ski jumper
- Gunnhild Sundli, a singer of the Norwegian folk music band Gåte
- Sveinung Sundli, a fiddle and keyboard player of Gåte

== International relations ==
=== Twin towns – Sister cities ===
Orkdal is twinned with:

- Mostar, Bosnia and Herzegovina

== See also ==
- List of former municipalities of Norway
