= Agdenes Municipality =

Former municipality in Trøndelag, Norway

Agdenes Municipality Agdenes kommune
- Former municipality
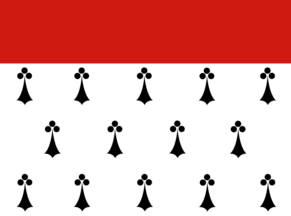
- Flag Coat of arms

- Trøndelag within Norway

- Agdenes within Trøndelag
- Coordinates: 63°32′05″N 09°42′04″E
- Country: Norway
- County: Trøndelag
- District: Orkdalen
- Established: 1 Jan 1896
  - Preceded by: Ørland Municipality
- Disestablished: 1 Jan 2020
  - Succeeded by: Orkland Municipality
- Administrative centre: Selbekken

Government
  - Mayor (1995–2019): Oddvar Indergård (H)

Area (upon dissolution)
  - Total: 317.29 km^{2} (122.51 sq mi)
  - Land: 296.52 km^{2} (114.49 sq mi)
  - Water: 20.77 km^{2} (8.02 sq mi) 6.5%
  - Rank: #270 in Norway
- Highest elevation: 656.2 m (2,153 ft)

Population (2019)
  - Total: 1,693
  - Rank: #343 in Norway
  - Density: 5.3/km^{2} (14/sq mi)
  - Change (10 years): ▼ −2.2%
- Demonym(s): Agdenesing; Lensvikbygg

Official language
  - Norwegian form: Bokmål
- Time zone: UTC+01:00 (CET)
  - Summer (DST): UTC+02:00 (CEST)
- ISO 3166 code: NO-5016

Agdenes is a former municipality in Trøndelag county, Norway. The 317-square-kilometre (122 sq mi) municipality existed from 1896 until its dissolution in 2020 when it became part of Orkland Municipality. It was part of the Fosen region. The administrative centre was the village of Selbekken. Other villages in the municipality included Ingdalen, Lensvik, Vassbygda, Vernes, and Leksa. The Brekstad–Valset Ferry connected Agdenes to the town of Brekstad in Ørland Municipality on the other side of the Trondheimsfjorden.

At the time of its dissolution, the 317-square-kilometre (122 sq mi) municipality was the 270th largest by area out of the 422 municipalities in Norway. Agdenes Municipality is the 343rd most populous municipality in Norway with a population of 1,693. The municipality's population density is 5.3 inhabitants per square kilometre (14/sq mi) and its population has decreased by 2.2% over the previous 10-year period.

== General information ==
The municipality of Værnes was established on 1 January 1896 when it was separated from the large Ørland Municipality which originally included land on both sides of the mouth of the Trondheimsfjorden. The new Værnes Municipality encompassed the area along the south side of the Trondheimsleia and Trondheimsfjorden and it initially had a population of 1,412. The name was changed to Agdenes Municipality on 17 May 1897 by a royal resolution.

During the 1960s, there were many municipal mergers across Norway due to the work of the Schei Committee. On 1 January 1964, some major municipal changes took place:

- the western part of Agdenes Municipality (Ytre Agdenes) was separated from the rest of the municipality and it was merged with the neighboring Snillfjord Municipality (population: 681) and Heim Municipality (population: 724) to form a new, larger Snillfjord Municipality.
- the eastern part of Agdenes Municipality (population: 858) was merged with the neighboring Lensvik Municipality (population: 1,136) and the Ingdalen area of Stadsbygd Municipality (population: 171) and together, they formed a new, larger Agdenes Municipality.

On 1 January 1995, the Moldtun area (population: 21) was transferred from Agdenes Municipality to the neighboring Snillfjord Municipality. This transfer was approved because the area had been without an outside road connection, and so the only connection was by boat which made it very close to the village of Vernes in Agdenes Municipality. When the road was built, it was built to the west, connecting it to Snillfjord Municipality, not Agdenes Municipality. Therefore, it was logical for the residents to vote to change municipalities.

On 1 January 2018, the municipality switched from the old Sør-Trøndelag county to the new Trøndelag county.

On 1 January 2020, the neighboring Agdenes Municipality, Orkdal Municipality, and Meldal Municipality, plus the majority of Snillfjord Municipality were merged to form the new Orkland Municipality.

=== Name ===
The municipality, originally the parish, is named after the old Agdenes farm (Old Norse: Agðanes), where the first Agdenes Church was built. The farm itself derives its name from the headland at the mouth of the Trondheim Fjord, where it is situated. The final element -nes translates to "headland". The meaning of the first element is uncertain but is likely connected to the name Agder and may originate from the word *agi, meaning "pointed" or "protruding". In this sense, the name would translate to "protruding headland".

=== Coat of arms ===
The coat of arms was granted on 30 August 1991 and it was in use until the dissolution of the municipality on 1 January 2020. The official blazon is "Ermine, a chief gules" (Norwegian: I hermelin et rødt skjoldhode). This means the arms have a field (background) that has a tincture of ermine, a type of fur design that mimics the winter coat of a stoat. The chief has a tincture of red. The ermine field symbolizes the fur farming industry in the municipality. As ermine is also a royal symbol, it symbolises the fact that in historical times the local overlords (jarls) and kings have resided in the village. The red chief across the top was chosen to represent the importance of strawberry farming in the municipality, although another interpretation is to represent the blood from the axe of the 10th-century King Eric Bloodaxe. The arms were designed by Einar Skjervold.

=== Churches ===
The Church of Norway had one parish (sokn) within Agdenes Municipality. It is part of the Orkdal prosti (deanery) in the Diocese of Nidaros.

Churches in Agdenes Municipality
Parish (sokn)	Church name	Location of the church	Year built
Agdenes	Agdenes Church	Vernes	1857
Agdenes	Lensvik Church	Lensvik	1863
Agdenes	Ingdal Chapel	Ingdalen	1960

== Economy ==
The industrial density of Agdenes is above the national average, and the primary sector is the biggest. Most of the inhabitants work within the milk or forest industry. The growth of strawberries and the breeding of fur animals are important industries as well.

The growth of strawberries has been a major industry in Agdenes for the past 100 years, started by the farmer Lars H. Selbæk in 1886 by planting some strawberry flowers and then giving them away to neighbouring farms. The most common varieties of strawberry grown here are Korona, Sephyr, Senga Sengana, and Bounty. Today, strawberry collection is performed by foreign workers, which are mainly from Poland and Lithuania. In the initial stages, the Norwegian youth were the main workforce, but after the 1970s, it became less attractive for them to pick strawberries in a field.

== Government ==
While it existed, Agdenes Municipality was responsible for primary education (through 10th grade), outpatient health services, senior citizen services, welfare and other social services, zoning, economic development, and municipal roads and utilities. The municipality was governed by a municipal council of directly elected representatives. The mayor was indirectly elected by a vote of the municipal council. The municipality was under the jurisdiction of the Sør-Trøndelag District Court and the Frostating Court of Appeal. Waste management was from 1995 handled by the inter-municipal agency HAMOS Forvaltning.

=== Municipal council ===
The municipal council (Kommunestyre) of Agdenes Municipality is made up of 17 representatives that are elected every four years. The tables below show the historical composition of the council by political party.

Agdenes kommunestyre 2015–2019
Party name (in Norwegian)	Number of representatives
Labour Party (Arbeiderpartiet)	3
Conservative Party (Høyre)	2
Centre Party (Senterpartiet)	2
Common list for rural development (Felleslista for bygdeutvikling)	10
Total number of members:	17

Agdenes kommunestyre 2011–2015
Party name (in Norwegian)	Number of representatives
Labour Party (Arbeiderpartiet)	3
Conservative Party (Høyre)	2
Christian Democratic Party (Kristelig Folkeparti)	1
Centre Party (Senterpartiet)	2
Local List(s) (Lokale lister)	4
Common list for rural development (Felleslista for bygdeutvikling)	5
Total number of members:	17

Agdenes kommunestyre 2007–2011
Party name (in Norwegian)	Number of representatives
Labour Party (Arbeiderpartiet)	3
Progress Party (Fremskrittspartiet)	1
Conservative Party (Høyre)	1
Christian Democratic Party (Kristelig Folkeparti)	1
Centre Party (Senterpartiet)	2
Cross-party list (Tverrpolitisk liste)	4
Common list for rural development (Felleslista for bygdeutvikling)	5
Total number of members:	17

Agdenes kommunestyre 2003–2007
Party name (in Norwegian)	Number of representatives
Labour Party (Arbeiderpartiet)	2
Progress Party (Fremskrittspartiet)	1
Conservative Party (Høyre)	1
Christian Democratic Party (Kristelig Folkeparti)	1
Centre Party (Senterpartiet)	2
Cross-party list (Tverrpolitisk liste)	4
Common list for rural development (Felleslista for bygdeutvikling)	6
Total number of members:	17

Agdenes kommunestyre 1999–2003
Party name (in Norwegian)	Number of representatives
Labour Party (Arbeiderpartiet)	2
Conservative Party (Høyre)	2
Christian Democratic Party (Kristelig Folkeparti)	1
Centre Party (Senterpartiet)	2
Cross-party list (Tverrpolitisk liste)	4
Common list for rural development (Felleslista for bygdeutvikling)	6
Total number of members:	17

Agdenes kommunestyre 1995–1999
Party name (in Norwegian)	Number of representatives
Labour Party (Arbeiderpartiet)	2
Conservative Party (Høyre)	4
Christian Democratic Party (Kristelig Folkeparti)	1
Centre Party (Senterpartiet)	5
Cross-party list (Tverrpolitisk liste)	5
Total number of members:	17

Agdenes kommunestyre 1991–1995
Party name (in Norwegian)	Number of representatives
Labour Party (Arbeiderpartiet)	3
Conservative Party (Høyre)	4
Christian Democratic Party (Kristelig Folkeparti)	1
Centre Party (Senterpartiet)	6
Lensvik and Ingdalen's common list (Lensvik og Ingdalens fellesliste)	1
Cross-party list (Tverrpolitisk liste)	2
Total number of members:	17

Agdenes kommunestyre 1987–1991
Party name (in Norwegian)	Number of representatives
Labour Party (Arbeiderpartiet)	5
Conservative Party (Høyre)	4
Christian Democratic Party (Kristelig Folkeparti)	2
Centre Party (Senterpartiet)	4
Cross-party list (Tverrpolitisk liste)	2
Total number of members:	17

Agdenes kommunestyre 1983–1987
Party name (in Norwegian)	Number of representatives
Labour Party (Arbeiderpartiet)	5
Conservative Party (Høyre)	3
Christian Democratic Party (Kristelig Folkeparti)	2
Centre Party (Senterpartiet)	4
Farmers and fur-farmers' list (Jordbrukernes og pelsdyroppdretternes liste)	1
Non-party common list (Upolitisk Fellesliste)	2
Total number of members:	17

Agdenes kommunestyre 1979–1983
Party name (in Norwegian)	Number of representatives
Labour Party (Arbeiderpartiet)	3
Conservative Party (Høyre)	2
Christian Democratic Party (Kristelig Folkeparti)	2
Centre Party (Senterpartiet)	5
Farmers and fur-farmers' list (Jordbrukernes og pelsdyroppdretternes liste)	2
Non-party common list (Upolitisk Fellesliste)	3
Total number of members:	17

Agdenes kommunestyre 1975–1979
Party name (in Norwegian)	Number of representatives
Labour Party (Arbeiderpartiet)	3
Christian Democratic Party (Kristelig Folkeparti)	2
Centre Party (Senterpartiet)	6
Farmers and fur-farmers' list (Jordbrukernes og pelsdyroppdretternes liste)	2
Non-party common list (Upolitisk Fellesliste)	4
Total number of members:	17

Agdenes kommunestyre 1971–1975
Party name (in Norwegian)	Number of representatives
Labour Party (Arbeiderpartiet)	5
Christian Democratic Party (Kristelig Folkeparti)	3
Centre Party (Senterpartiet)	5
Local List(s) (Lokale lister)	4
Total number of members:	17

Agdenes kommunestyre 1967–1971
Party name (in Norwegian)	Number of representatives
Labour Party (Arbeiderpartiet)	5
Christian Democratic Party (Kristelig Folkeparti)	2
Centre Party (Senterpartiet)	4
Local List(s) (Lokale lister)	6
Total number of members:	17

Agdenes kommunestyre 1963–1967
Party name (in Norwegian)	Number of representatives
Labour Party (Arbeiderpartiet)	6
Christian Democratic Party (Kristelig Folkeparti)	1
Centre Party (Senterpartiet)	4
List of workers, fishermen, and small farmholders (Arbeidere, fiskere, småbrukere liste)	1
Joint List(s) of Non-Socialist Parties (Borgerlige Felleslister)	4
Local List(s) (Lokale lister)	1
Total number of members:	17

Agdenes herredsstyre 1959–1963
Party name (in Norwegian)	Number of representatives
Labour Party (Arbeiderpartiet)	5
Local List(s) (Lokale lister)	12
Total number of members:	17

Agdenes herredsstyre 1955–1959
Party name (in Norwegian)	Number of representatives
Labour Party (Arbeiderpartiet)	7
Joint List(s) of Non-Socialist Parties (Borgerlige Felleslister)	10
Total number of members:	17

Agdenes herredsstyre 1951–1955
Party name (in Norwegian)	Number of representatives
Labour Party (Arbeiderpartiet)	5
Joint List(s) of Non-Socialist Parties (Borgerlige Felleslister)	7
Total number of members:	12

Agdenes herredsstyre 1947–1951
Party name (in Norwegian)	Number of representatives
Labour Party (Arbeiderpartiet)	5
Joint List(s) of Non-Socialist Parties (Borgerlige Felleslister)	7
Total number of members:	12

Agdenes herredsstyre 1945–1947
Party name (in Norwegian)	Number of representatives
Labour Party (Arbeiderpartiet)	5
Joint List(s) of Non-Socialist Parties (Borgerlige Felleslister)	4
Local List(s) (Lokale lister)	3
Total number of members:	12

Agdenes herredsstyre 1937–1941*
Party name (in Norwegian)	Number of representatives
Labour Party (Arbeiderpartiet)	4
Joint List(s) of Non-Socialist Parties (Borgerlige Felleslister)	8
Total number of members:	12
Note: Due to the German occupation of Norway during World War II, no elections were held for new municipal councils until after the war ended in 1945.

=== Mayors ===
The mayor (Norwegian: ordfører) of Agdenes Municipality was the political leader of the municipality and the chairperson of the municipal council. Here is a list of people who held this position:

- 1896–1900: Olaus Tyskø (V)
- 1900–1919: John O. Bjørgan (V)
- 1920–1933: Johan Wingan (V)
- 1933–1934: Anton E. Lystad (Bp)
- 1935–1943: Kristian Vatn (V)
- 1943–1945: Lorentz Bjørgan (NS)
- 1945–1945: Kristian Vatn (V)
- 1946–1947: Knut Langnes (Ap)
- 1948–1955: Thomas Valseth (V)
- 1956–1957: Arne F. Fjorden (V)
- 1958–1959: Oskar S. Selvli (H)
- 1960–1963: Arne F. Fjorden (V)
- 1964–1967: Arne Utnes (Sp)
- 1968–1975: Ole K. Tøndel (Sp)
- 1976–1983: Jens G. Singstad (Sp)
- 1984–1987: Audun Selbæk (Sp)
- 1988–1995: Anne Marie Grymyr Sterten (Sp)
- 1995–2019: Oddvar Indergård (H)

== Geography ==
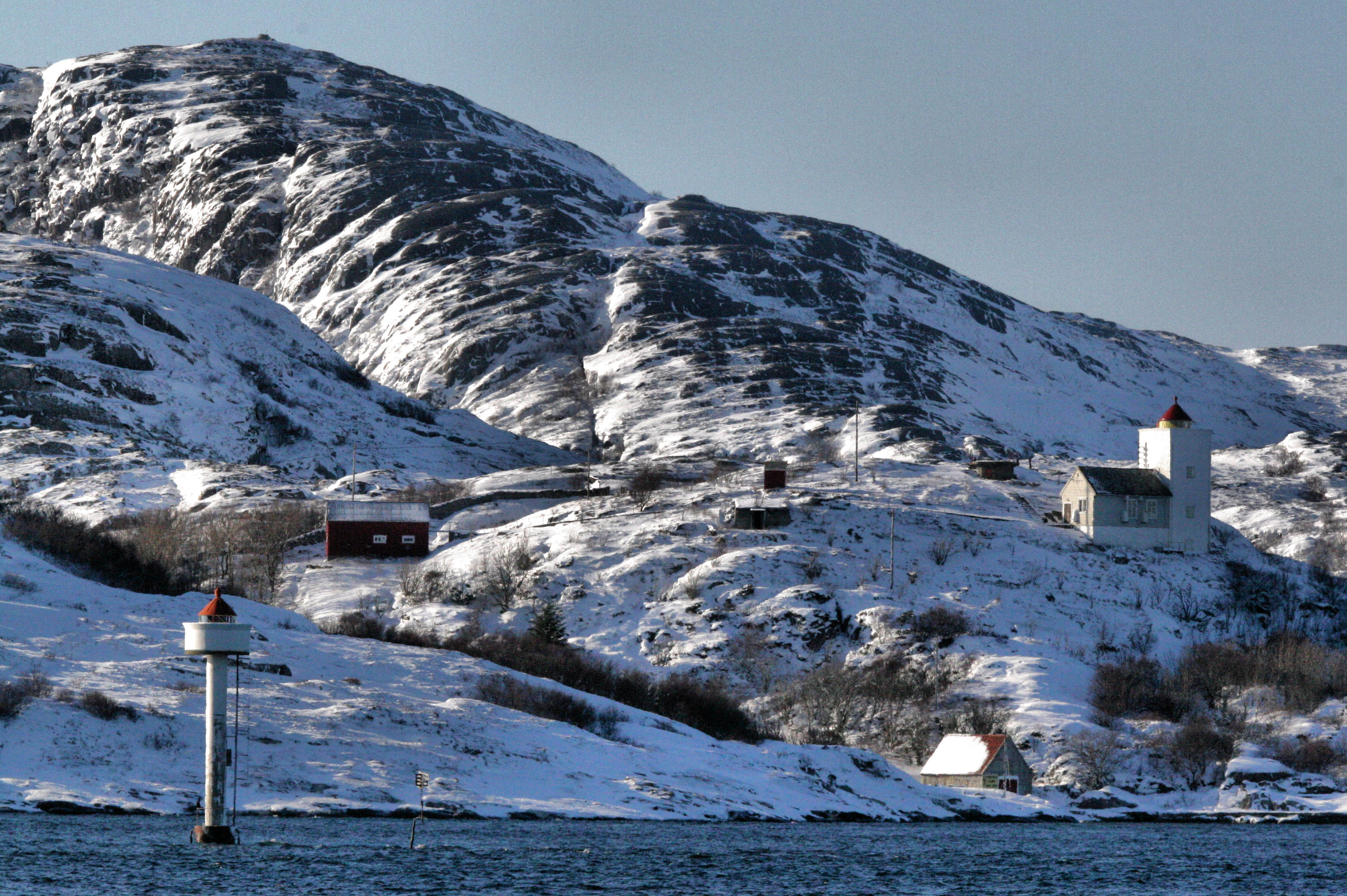
View of the lighthouse in the Trondheimsfjord

The municipality was situated at the south end of the mouth of the Trondheimsfjord where it met the Trondheimsleia. It included several islands including Leksa. The municipality bordered Hitra Municipality, Ørland Municipality, Indre Fosen Municipality, Orkdal Municipality, and Snillfjord Municipality. The lake Øyangsvatnet was located in the west central part of the municipality. The Agdenes Lighthouse was located on the edge of the Trondheimsfjord. The highest point in the municipality was the 656.2-metre (2,153 ft) tall mountain Hestgrovheia, just west of the village of Lensvik.

=== Birdlife ===
The municipality of Agdenes had a rich and varied birdlife. One of the better places was Litlvatnet. Fully protected since 1983, this nature reserve comprised shallow water with extensive reed beds. The lake was surrounded by farm land, which in its own right provides food and shelter for several species. Formed during the last ice age when sea levels dropped leaving exposed areas of land and trapped water from the melting ice, today's Litlvatnet is a remnant of this.

== See also ==
- List of former municipalities of Norway
