= Kjøra =

Village in Orkland Municipality, Norway

- Village
- Interactive map of Kjøra
- Location within Trøndelag Location within Norway
- Coordinates: 63.4169°N 09.9603°E
- Country: Norway
- Region: Central Norway
- County: Trøndelag
- District: Orkdalen
- Municipality: Orkland Municipality
- Elevation: 58 m (190 ft)
- Time zone: UTC+01:00 (CET)
  - Summer (DST): UTC+02:00 (CEST)
- Post Code: 7310 Gjølme

Kjøra is a village in Orkland Municipality in Trøndelag county, Norway. The village is located along the Trondheimsfjord. The village is located about 10 kilometres (6.2 mi) southeast of the village of Selbekken and about 17 kilometres (11 mi) north of the Råbygda/Orkanger/Fannrem urban area.
