= Ingdalen Chapel =

Church in Trøndelag, Norway

- Ingdalen kapell
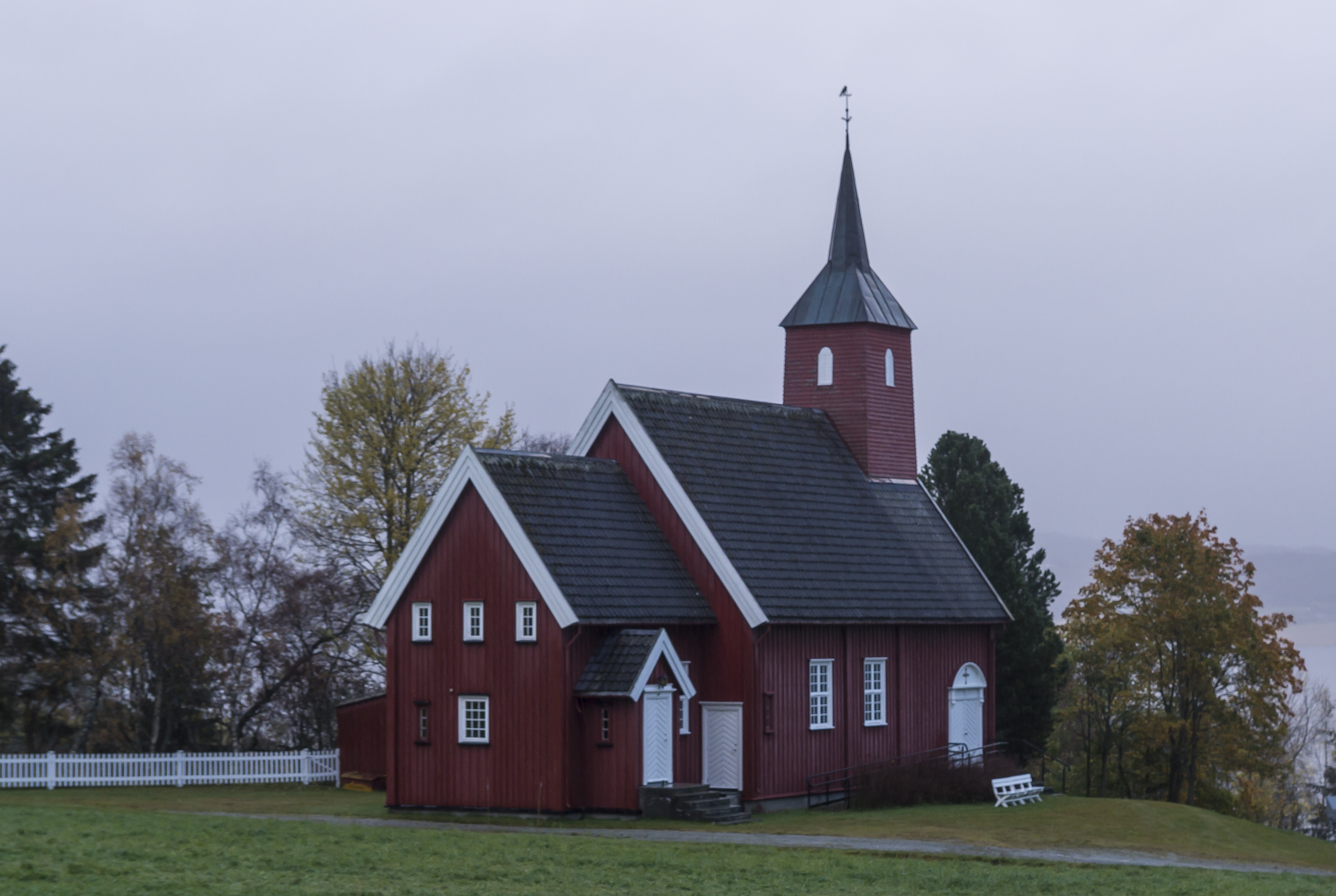
- View of the church
- Ingdalen Chapel
- 63°27′30″N 9°54′22″E
- Location: Orkland Municipality, Trøndelag
- Country: Norway
- Denomination: Church of Norway
- Churchmanship: Evangelical Lutheran

History
- Status: Parish church
- Founded: 1960
- Consecrated: 1960

Architecture
- Functional status: Active
- Architect: John Egil Tverdahl
- Architectural type: Long church
- Completed: 1960 (66 years ago)

Specifications
- Capacity: 140
- Materials: Wood

Administration
- Diocese: Nidaros bispedømme
- Deanery: Orkdal prosti
- Parish: Agdenes
- Norwegian Cultural Heritage Site
- Type: Church
- Status: Not protected
- ID: 84720

Ingdalen Chapel (Norwegian: Ingdalen kapell) is a parish church of the Church of Norway in Orkland Municipality in Trøndelag county, Norway. It is located in the village of Ingdalen, along the Trondheimsfjord about 6 kilometres (3.7 mi) south of Selbekken. It is one of the three churches for the Agdenes parish which is part of the Orkdal prosti (deanery) in the Diocese of Nidaros. The red, wooden church was built in a long church style in 1960 by volunteers and donations and using plans drawn up by the architect John Tverdahl. The church seats about 140 people.

== History ==
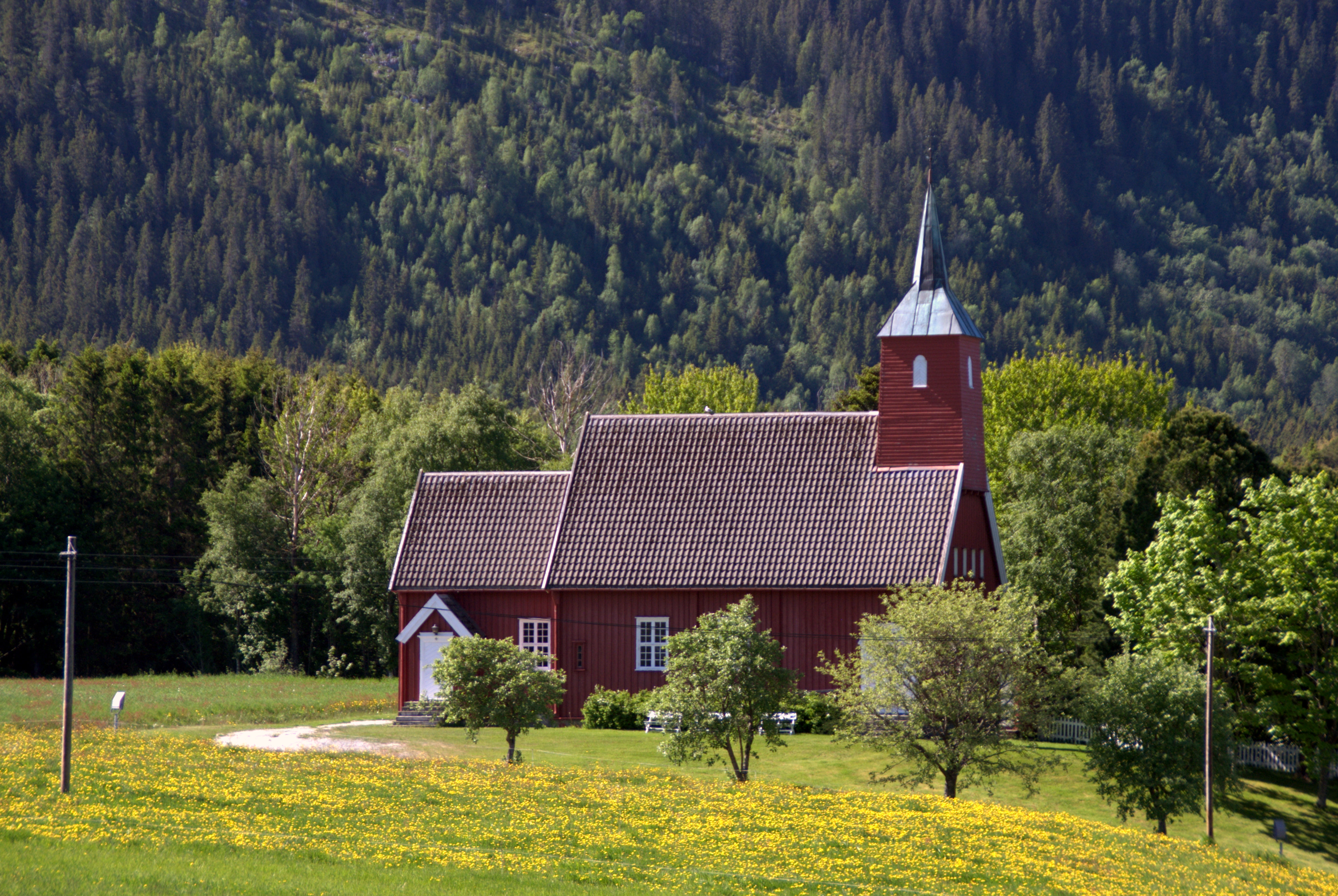
View of the church

The idea of a church in Ingdalen has been around for a long time since the people of this village historically had to cross the Trondheimsfjorden in order to get to the church for their parish, Stadsbygd Church. Towards the end of World War II, this effort was formalized with meetings and the appointment of a committee. This was followed by fundraising, and then the architect John Tverdahl was hired in 1945 to draw up plans for the building. The formal inquiry to the Norwegian Ministry of Church Affairs and Education came in 1957, and the Royal Decree approving the construction of the new church was given in October 1957. The construction of the church took place during the summer of 1959 under the leadership of builder Knut Kristian Grostad. The new building was consecrated on 11 December 1960 by the Bishop Arne Fjellbu.

== See also ==
- List of churches in Nidaros
