= Hoston, Trøndelag =

Village in Orkland Municipality, Norway

Hoston
- Village
- Interactive map of Hoston
- Location within Trøndelag Location within Norway
- Coordinates: 63.1949°N 09.5877°E
- Country: Norway
- Region: Central Norway
- County: Trøndelag
- District: Orkdalen
- Municipality: Orkland Municipality
- Elevation: 205 m (673 ft)
- Time zone: UTC+01:00 (CET)
  - Summer (DST): UTC+02:00 (CEST)
- Post Code: 7327 Svorkmo

Hoston is a village in Orkland Municipality in Trøndelag county, Norway. The village is located on the northeastern shore of the lake Hostovatnet, about 9 kilometres (5.6 mi) west of the village of Vormstad. The Søvasskjølen Church is located in the mountains about 12 kilometres (7.5 mi) to the northwest of Hoston.
