= Øyangsvatnet =

Lake in Agdenes, Norway

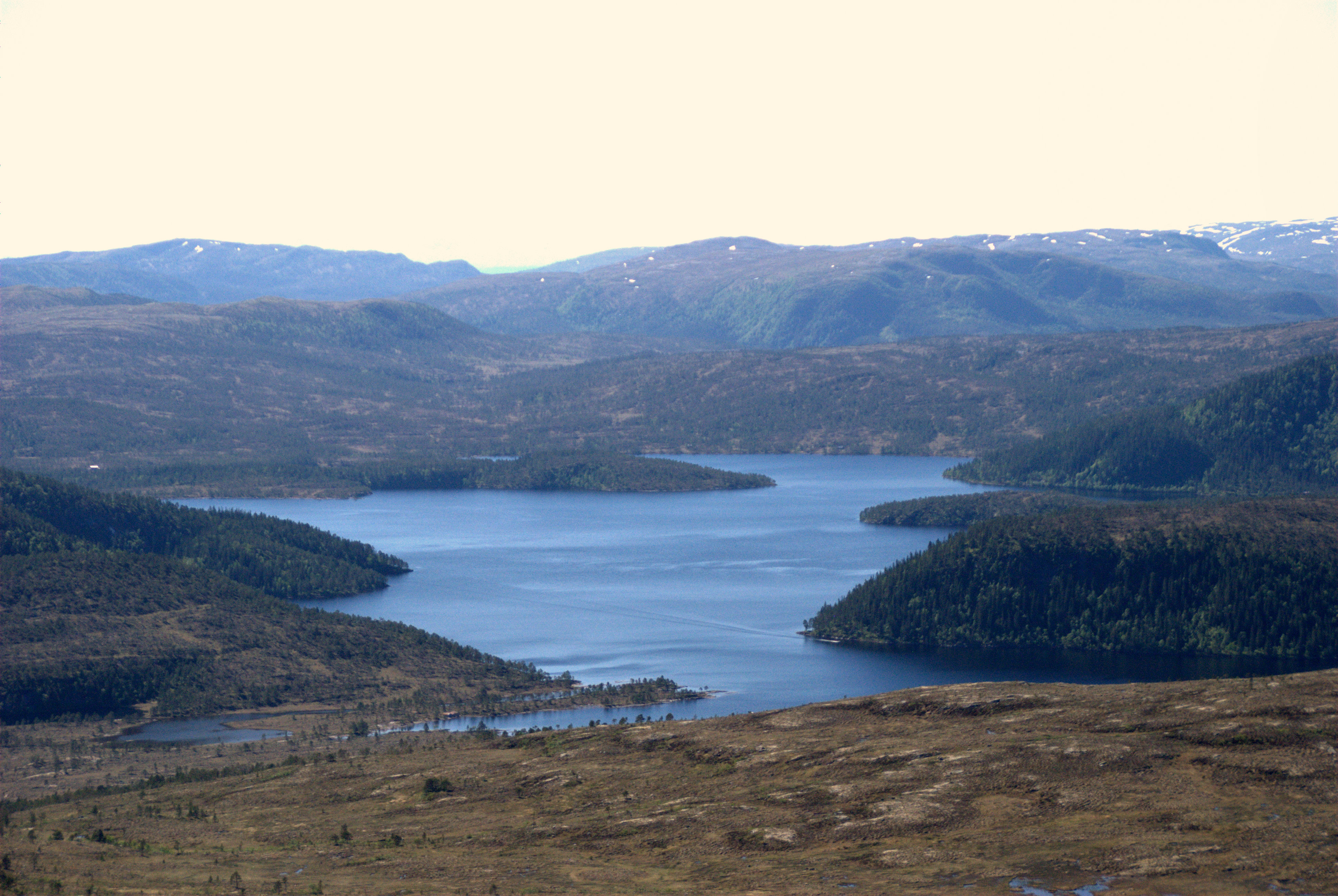
- Interactive map of the lake
- Location: Orkland Municipality, Trøndelag
- Coordinates: 63.4681°N 09.6739°E
- Basin countries: Norway
- Max. length: 4 kilometres (2.5 mi)
- Max. width: 3 kilometres (1.9 mi)
- Surface area: 6.75 km^{2} (2.61 sq mi)
- Shore length^{1}: 35.6 kilometres (22.1 mi)
- Surface elevation: 126 metres (413 ft)
- References: NVE
- ^{1} Shore length is not a well-defined measure.

Øyangsvatnet is a lake in Orkland Municipality in Trøndelag county, Norway. The lake lies in the north central part of the municipality. The lake is about 6.5 kilometres (4.0 mi) west of the villages of Lensvik and Selbekken and about 9 kilometres (5.6 mi) west of the village of Ingdalen.

== See also ==
- List of lakes in Norway
