= Lensvik =

Village in Orkland Municipality, Norway

- Village
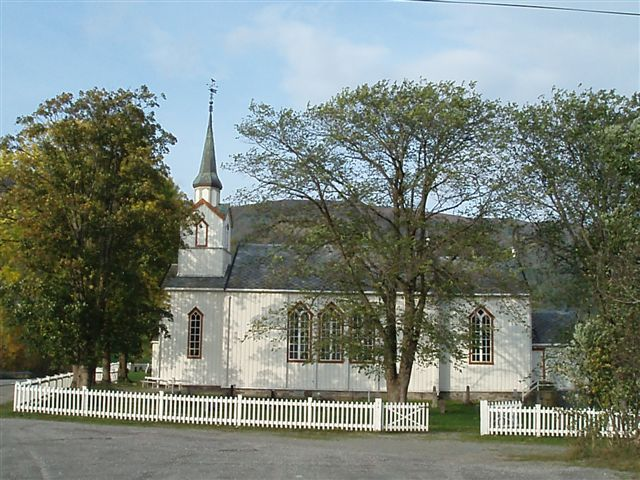
- View of the village
- Interactive map of Lensvik
- Location within Trøndelag Location within Norway
- Coordinates: 63.5130°N 09.8087°E
- Country: Norway
- Region: Central Norway
- County: Trøndelag
- District: Fosen
- Municipality: Orkland Municipality
- Elevation: 12 m (39 ft)
- Time zone: UTC+01:00 (CET)
  - Summer (DST): UTC+02:00 (CEST)
- Post Code: 7316 Lensvik

Lensvik is a village in Orkland Municipality in Trøndelag county, Norway. The village is located on the western shore of the Trondheimsfjorden, just north of the village of Selbekken. Lensvik is the site of Lensvik Church, and it lies about 7.5 kilometres (4.7 mi) north of the village of Ingdalen. The lake Øyangsvatnet is located about 6.5 kilometres (4.0 mi) to the west of Lensvik.

== History ==
The village was the administrative centre of the old Lensvik Municipality which existed from 1905-1964 when it became part of Agdenes Municipality. In 2020, it became part of Orkland Municipality.

== Attractions ==
Lensvik is often called the strawberry capital of Norway. The strawberries are sought after as far as the United States and France. The strawberry season runs from July to August. The first week of July also holds the annual strawberry festival.

Biannually, Lensvik hosts "Street-Meets" featuring high-powered motor vehicles, including street rods, ATVs, and modified Ramblers. The gatherings take place in a central village parking lot and attract local families to watch vehicle demonstrations, including burnouts.

== Media gallery ==
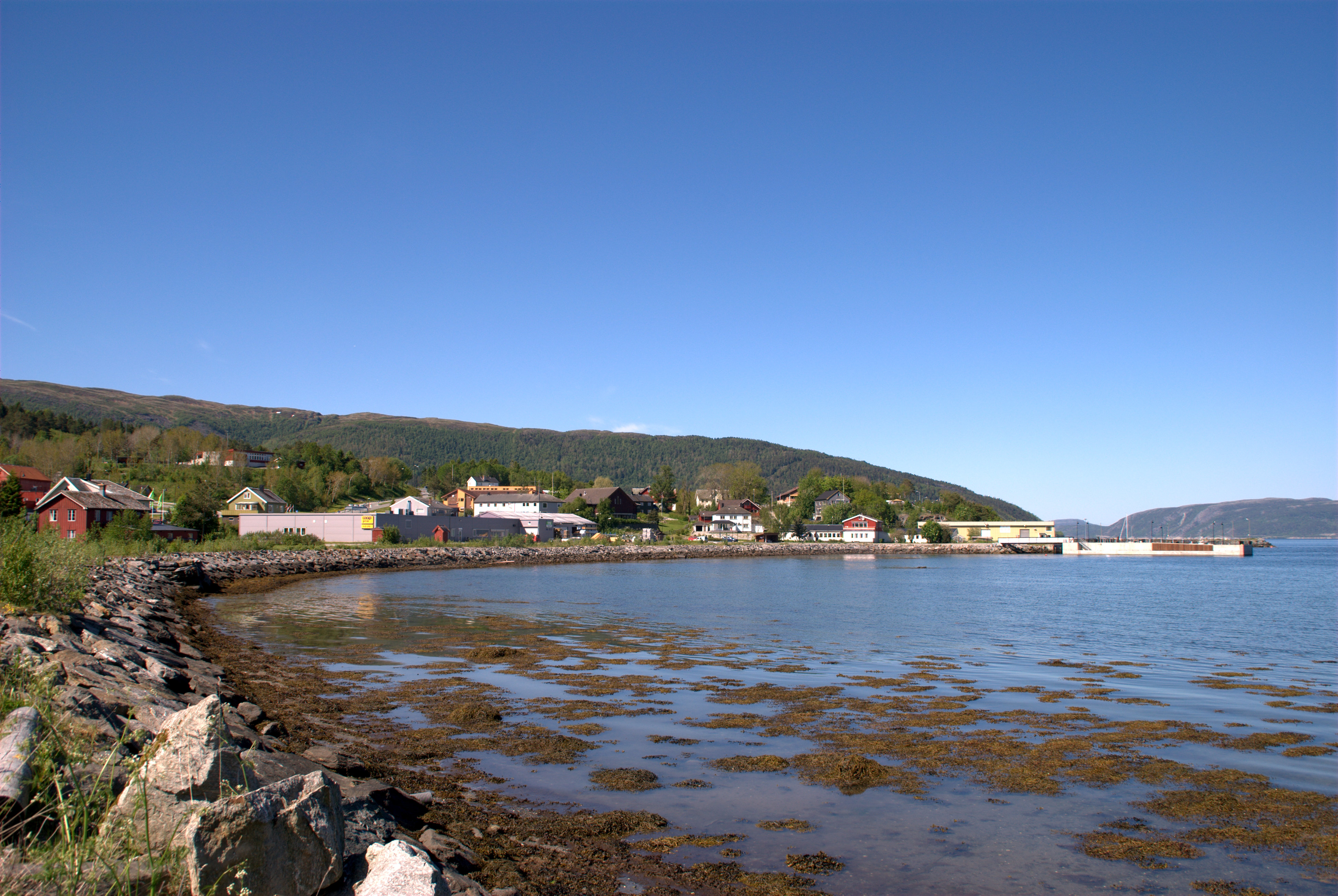
View of the shoreline

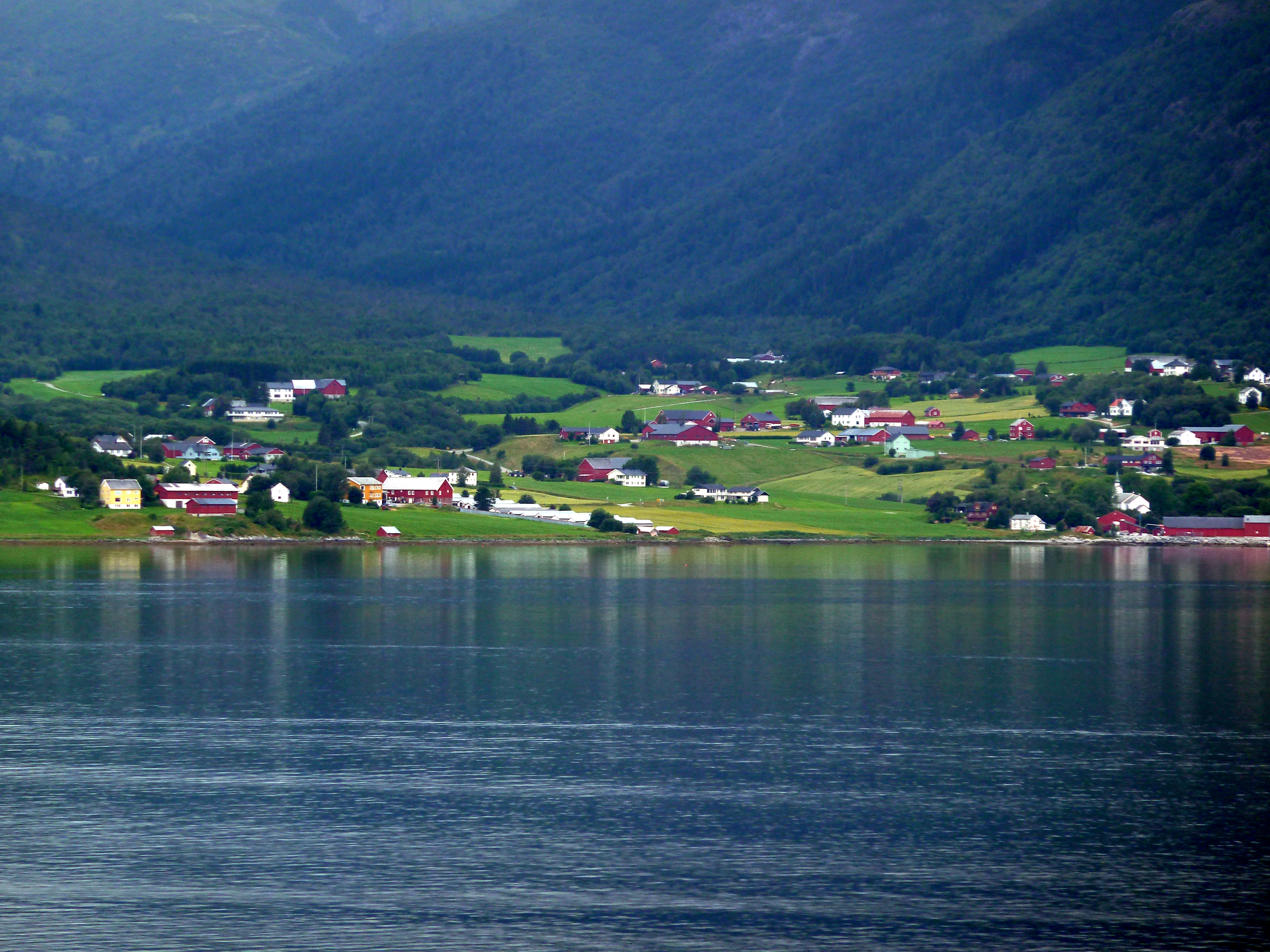
View of the village

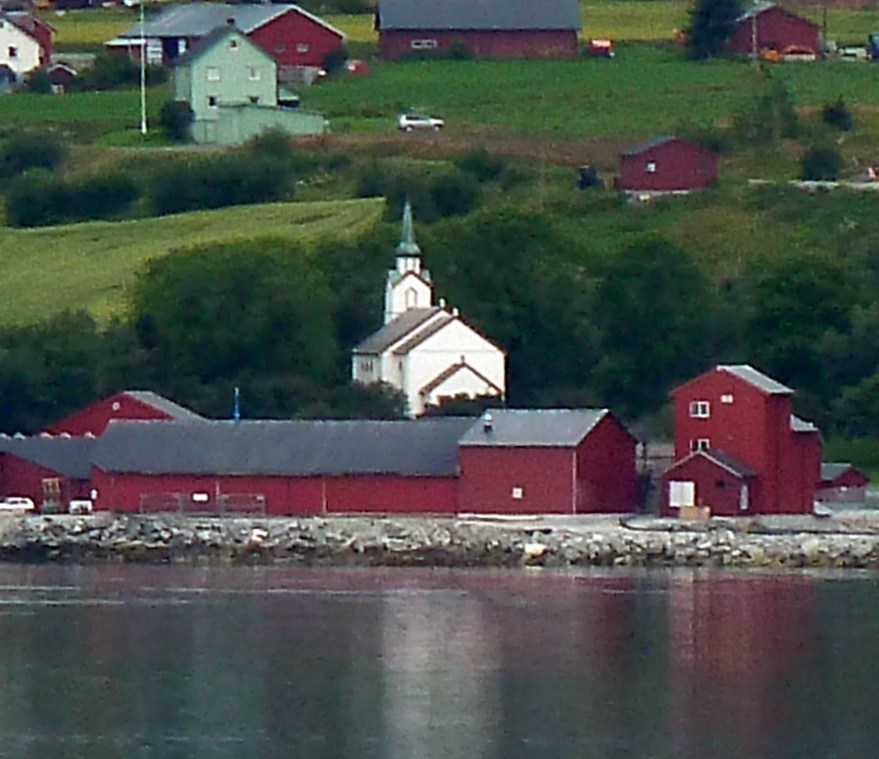
View of the Lensvik Church
