= Ingrid Sandvik =

Norwegian politician

Ingrid Sandvik (2 June 1921 – 16 June 1976) was a Norwegian politician for the Labour Party.

She rose in the ranks of the Labour Party, from the Workers' Youth League to being elected to the municipal council of Orkdal Municipality. At the time, she was the only female councillor. When becoming mayor of Orkdal Municipality in 1968, she was the only female mayor in Norway. She was also a member of the county school board, and was deputy county mayor. She served as a deputy representative to the Parliament of Norway from Sør-Trøndelag during the terms 1969–1973 and 1973–1977. In total she met during 79 days of parliamentary session.

Before the end of her last term as a Parliament deputy, she died following a period of illness. She had already stepped down as mayor in 1975 for the same reason.
