= Ingdalen =

Village in Orkland Municipality, Norway

- Village
- Interactive map of Ingdalen
- Location within Trøndelag Location within Norway
- Coordinates: 63.4596°N 09.9093°E
- Country: Norway
- Region: Central Norway
- County: Trøndelag
- District: Fosen
- Municipality: Orkland Municipality
- Elevation: 11 m (36 ft)
- Time zone: UTC+01:00 (CET)
  - Summer (DST): UTC+02:00 (CEST)
- Post Code: 7316 Lensvik

Ingdalen is a village in Orkland Municipality in Trøndelag county, Norway. The village lies along the western shore of the Trondheimsfjord about 6.5 kilometres (4.0 mi) south of the villages of Lensvik and Selbekken. Ingdal Chapel is located in the village. The lake Øyangsvatnet lies about 10 kilometres (6.2 mi) west of the village.

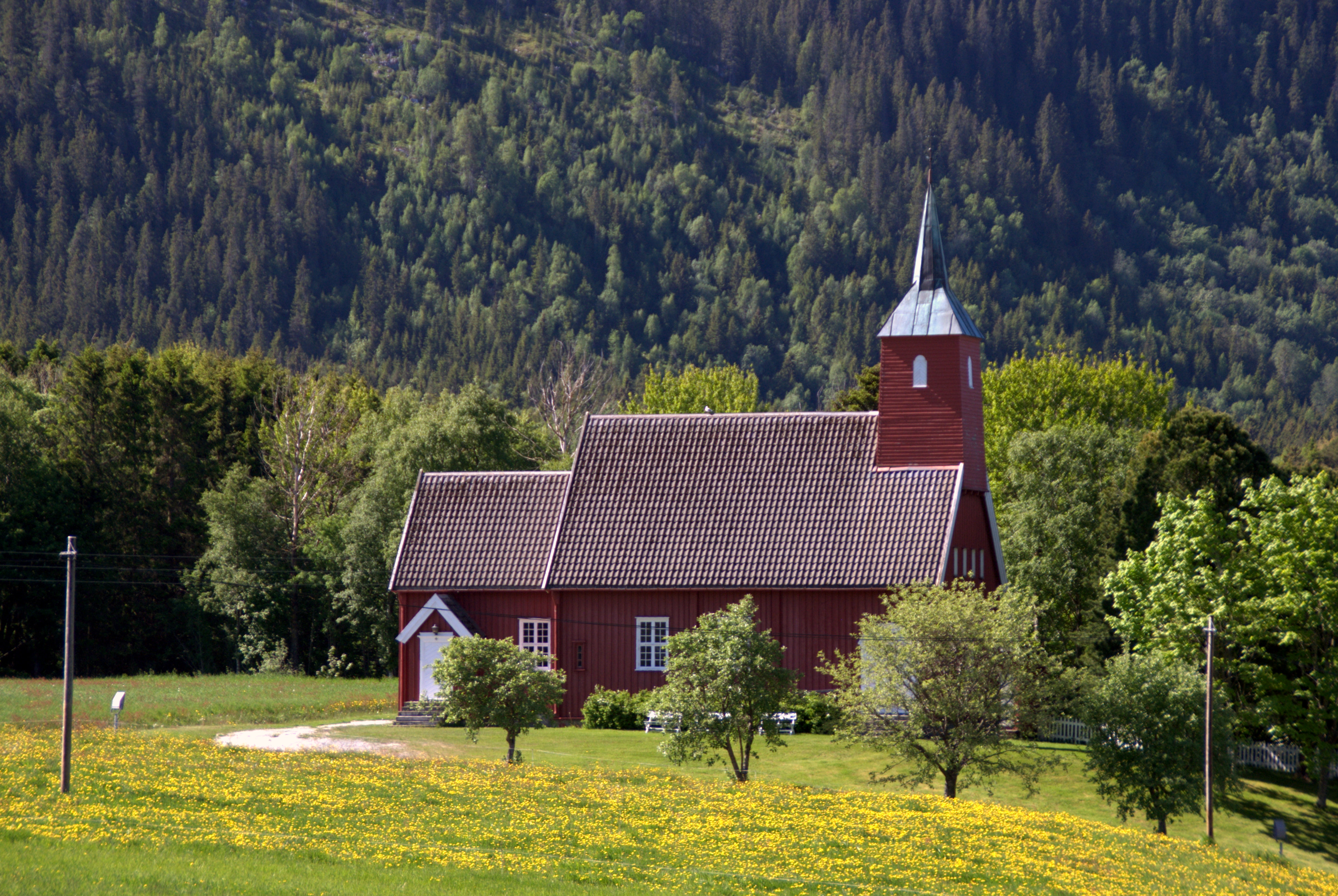
Ingdalen Chapel

== History ==
The village was once a part of Stadsbygd Municipality which included land on both sides of the Trondheimsfjord, but in 1964 the Ingdalen area was separated from Stadsbygd and merged into Agdenes Municipality which was on the same side of the fjord. In 2020, the area became part of Orkland Municipality.
