= Søvasskjølen Church =

Church in Trøndelag, Norway

- Søvasskjølen fjellkirke
- Søvasskjølen Church
- 63.247893918°N 09.5019373297°E
- Location: Orkland Municipality, Trøndelag
- Country: Norway
- Denomination: Church of Norway
- Churchmanship: Evangelical Lutheran

History
- Status: Chapel
- Founded: 1981
- Consecrated: 23 Aug 1981

Architecture
- Functional status: Active
- Completed: 1981 (45 years ago)

Specifications
- Capacity: 130
- Materials: Wood

Administration
- Diocese: Nidaros bispedømme
- Deanery: Orkdal prosti
- Parish: Orkdal

Søvasskjølen Church (Norwegian: Søvasskjølen fjellkirke) is a chapel of the Church of Norway in Orkland Municipality in Trøndelag county, Norway. It is located in the Svorksjødalen valley, about 16 kilometres (9.9 mi) west of Fannrem. It is an annex chapel for the Orkdal parish which is part of the Orkdal prosti (deanery) in the Diocese of Nidaros. The small church was built in 1981 in a long church style to be a mountain sports chapel. The church looks like a holiday cottage and it seats about 130 people.

== History ==
The mountain sports chapel was built in 1981 and it was consecrated on 23 August 1981. The church has an altarpiece made by Kalla Skrøvseth. The church is owned and run by a foundation.

== See also ==
- List of churches in Nidaros
