= Stadsbygd Municipality =

Former municipality in Sør-Trøndelag, Norway

Stadsbygd Municipality Stadsbygd herred
- Former municipality
- Stadsbygden herred (historic name)
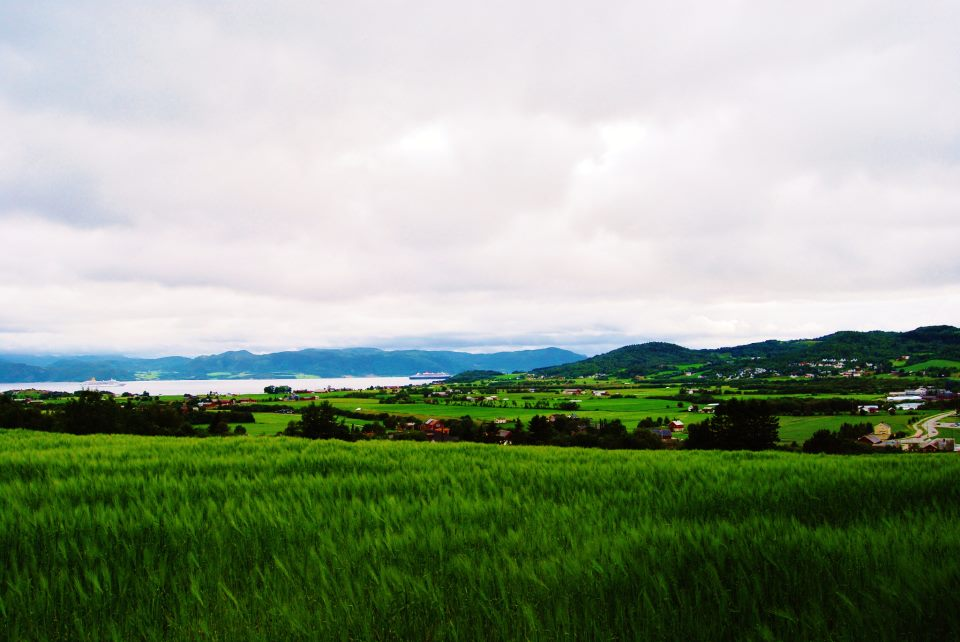

- Sør-Trøndelag within Norway

- Stadsbygd within Sør-Trøndelag
- Coordinates: 63°30′34″N 10°01′09″E
- Country: Norway
- County: Sør-Trøndelag
- District: Fosen
- Established: 1 Jan 1838
  - Created as: Formannskapsdistrikt
- Disestablished: 1 Jan 1964
  - Succeeded by: Rissa Municipality and Agdenes Municipality
- Administrative centre: Stadsbygd

Government
  - Mayor (1962–1963): Arne Holten (V)

Area (upon dissolution)
  - Total: 137.1 km^{2} (52.9 sq mi)
  - Rank: #452 in Norway

Population (1963)
  - Total: 1,818
  - Rank: #472 in Norway
  - Density: 13.3/km^{2} (34/sq mi)
  - Change (10 years): ▼ −8%
- Demonym: Stadværing

Official language
  - Norwegian form: Neutral
- Time zone: UTC+01:00 (CET)
  - Summer (DST): UTC+02:00 (CEST)
- ISO 3166 code: NO-1625

Stadsbygd is a former municipality in the old Sør-Trøndelag county, Norway. The municipality existed from 1838 until its dissolution in 1964. The 137-square-kilometre (53 sq mi) municipality existed on the southern part of the Fosen peninsula, along the Trondheimsfjorden in what is now Indre Fosen Municipality in Trøndelag county. The administrative centre was the village of Stadsbygd, just north of the Stadsbygd Church.

Prior to its dissolution in 1963, the 137-square-kilometre (53 sq mi) municipality was the 452nd largest by area out of the 689 municipalities in Norway. Stadsbygd Municipality was the 472nd most populous municipality in Norway with a population of about 1,818. The municipality's population density was 13.3 inhabitants per square kilometre (34/sq mi) and its population had decreased by 8% over the previous 10-year period.

== General information ==
The municipality of Stadsbygd was established on 1 January 1838 (see formannskapsdistrikt law). In 1860, the northwestern district of Stadsbygd (population: 3,733) was separated to form a municipality the new Rissa Municipality. The split left Stadsbygd Municipality with a population of 1,828. During the 1960s, there were many municipal mergers across Norway due to the work of the Schei Committee. On 1 January 1964, the Ingdalen district south of the Trondheimsfjord (population: 171) was merged into Agdenes Municipality. The rest of Stadsbygd Municipality, located north of the Trondheimsfjord (population: 1,616), was merged with Rissa Municipality (population: 3,264) and the southern part of Stjørna Municipality (population: 1,868) to form a new, larger Rissa Municipality.

=== Name ===
The municipality (originally the parish) is named after the peninsula on which it is located (Old Norse: Staðr). The first element of the name comes from the word staðr which means "place" or "abode". The last element comes from the word byggð which means "settlement" or "farm". Historically, the name of the municipality was spelled Stadsbygden. On 3 November 1917, a royal resolution changed the spelling of the name of the municipality to Stadsbygd, removing the definite form ending -en.

=== Churches ===
The Church of Norway had one parish (sokn) within Stadsbygd Municipality. At the time of the municipal dissolution, it was part of the Stadsbygd prestegjeld and the Fosen prosti (deanery) in the Diocese of Nidaros.

Churches in Stadsbygd Municipality
Parish (sokn)	Church name	Location of the church	Year built
Stadsbygd	Stadsbygd Church	Stadsbygd	1842

== Government ==
While it existed, Stadsbygd Municipality was responsible for primary education (through 10th grade), outpatient health services, senior citizen services, welfare and other social services, zoning, economic development, and municipal roads and utilities. The municipality was governed by a municipal council of directly elected representatives. The mayor was indirectly elected by a vote of the municipal council. The municipality was under the jurisdiction of the Frostating Court of Appeal.

=== Municipal council ===
The municipal council (Herredsstyre) of Stadsbygd Municipality was made up of 21 representatives that were elected to four year terms. The tables below show the historical composition of the council by political party.

Stadsbygd herredsstyre 1959–1963
Party name (in Norwegian)	Number of representatives
Labour Party (Arbeiderpartiet)	6
Conservative Party (Høyre)	2
Christian Democratic Party (Kristelig Folkeparti)	3
Centre Party (Senterpartiet)	5
Liberal Party (Venstre)	2
Local List(s) (Lokale lister)	3
Total number of members:	21
Note: On 1 January 1964, Stadsbygd Municipality became part of Rissa Municipality.

Stadsbygd herredsstyre 1955–1959
Party name (in Norwegian)	Number of representatives
Labour Party (Arbeiderpartiet)	5
Conservative Party (Høyre)	2
Christian Democratic Party (Kristelig Folkeparti)	3
Farmers' Party (Bondepartiet)	4
Liberal Party (Venstre)	2
Local List(s) (Lokale lister)	5
Total number of members:	21

Stadsbygd herredsstyre 1951–1955
Party name (in Norwegian)	Number of representatives
Labour Party (Arbeiderpartiet)	4
Conservative Party (Høyre)	2
Christian Democratic Party (Kristelig Folkeparti)	2
Farmers' Party (Bondepartiet)	4
Liberal Party (Venstre)	3
Local List(s) (Lokale lister)	5
Total number of members:	20

Stadsbygd herredsstyre 1947–1951
Party name (in Norwegian)	Number of representatives
Labour Party (Arbeiderpartiet)	4
Conservative Party (Høyre)	1
Christian Democratic Party (Kristelig Folkeparti)	3
Farmers' Party (Bondepartiet)	4
Liberal Party (Venstre)	3
Local List(s) (Lokale lister)	5
Total number of members:	20

Stadsbygd herredsstyre 1945–1947
Party name (in Norwegian)	Number of representatives
Labour Party (Arbeiderpartiet)	4
Conservative Party (Høyre)	1
Christian Democratic Party (Kristelig Folkeparti)	2
Farmers' Party (Bondepartiet)	4
Liberal Party (Venstre)	3
Local List(s) (Lokale lister)	6
Total number of members:	20

Stadsbygd herredsstyre 1937–1941*
Party name (in Norwegian)	Number of representatives
Labour Party (Arbeiderpartiet)	3
Conservative Party (Høyre)	1
Farmers' Party (Bondepartiet)	6
Liberal Party (Venstre)	5
Local List(s) (Lokale lister)	5
Total number of members:	20
Note: Due to the German occupation of Norway during World War II, no elections were held for new municipal councils until after the war ended in 1945.

=== Mayors ===
The mayor (Norwegian: ordfører) of Stadsbygd Municipality was the political leader of the municipality and the chairperson of the municipal council. Here is a list of people who held this position:

- 1838–1841: Johan Henrik Berlin Rüsing
- 1842–1845: Otto Schrøder Arentz
- 1853–1856: Nathan Steen
- 1857–1862: Nils Buan
- 1863–1864: Jakob Holtermann
- 1865–1868: Johannes Børsting
- 1869–1870: Jakob Myhr
- 1871–1876: Peder Røberg (H)
- 1877–1889: Nils Nilsen Pukstad (H)
- 1890–1891: Lars Foss (V)
- 1892–1913: Benjamin Olsen Schei (V)
- 1914–1916: Jacob Sann (V)
- 1917–1919: Jon J. Kvidal (V)
- 1920–1925: Jacob Sann (Bp)
- 1926–1928: Johannes Børsting (V)
- 1929–1931: Jacob Sann (Bp)
- 1932–1940: Johannes Børsting (V)
- 1941–1945: Jørgen M. Jacobsen (NS)
- 1945–1945: Johannes Børsting (V)
- 1946–1947: Johan P. Hårsaker (Bp)
- 1948–1955: Arne B. Schei (KrF)
- 1956–1961: Kristoffer Rein (KrF)
- 1961–1961: Kristoffer Tung (Sp)
- 1962–1963: Arne Holten (V)

== See also ==
- List of former municipalities of Norway
