= Lensvik Church =

Church in Trøndelag, Norway

- Lensvik kirke
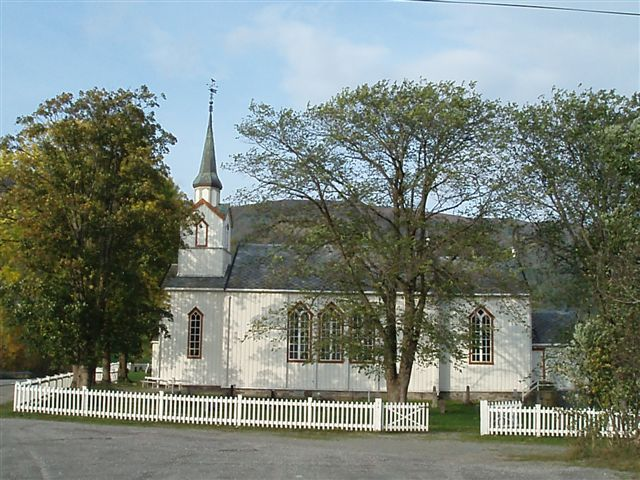
- View of the church
- Lensvik Church
- 63°30′53″N 9°48′24″E
- Location: Orkland Municipality, Trøndelag
- Country: Norway
- Denomination: Church of Norway
- Churchmanship: Evangelical Lutheran

History
- Status: Parish church
- Founded: 1863
- Consecrated: 26 Oct 1863

Architecture
- Functional status: Active
- Architect: Christian Heinrich Grosch
- Architectural type: Long church
- Style: Swiss chalet style
- Completed: 1863 (163 years ago)

Specifications
- Capacity: 230
- Materials: Wood

Administration
- Diocese: Nidaros bispedømme
- Deanery: Orkdal prosti
- Parish: Agdenes
- Norwegian Cultural Heritage Site
- Type: Church
- Status: Not protected
- ID: 84287

Lensvik Church (Norwegian: Lensvik kirke) is a parish church of the Church of Norway in Orkland Municipality in Trøndelag county, Norway. It is located in the village of Lensvik, along the Trondheimsfjord, just north of Selbekken. It is one of the three churches for the Agdenes parish which is part of the Orkdal prosti (deanery) in the Diocese of Nidaros. The white, wooden church was built in a long church style in 1863 using plans drawn up by the architect Christian Heinrich Grosch. The church seats about 230 people.

== History ==
Historically, the people of Lensvik were part of the Rissa parish based at the medieval Rein Church on the northeast side of the fjord. Since Lensvik was on the southwest side of the fjord, the residents had to cross the large Trondheimsfjorden every time they wanted to go to church. In the 1850s and 1860s, the people on the other side of the fjord began pushing for their own church. The church was constructed in 1863 by the builder Steffen Andersen Røe using architectural drawings by Christian Heinrich Grosch. It was built in a Swiss chalet style. The church was consecrated on 26 October 1863 by the Bishop Andreas Grimelund. In 1947, the church was renovated and a sacristy was added. This project was led by the architect John Tverdahl.

== Media gallery ==
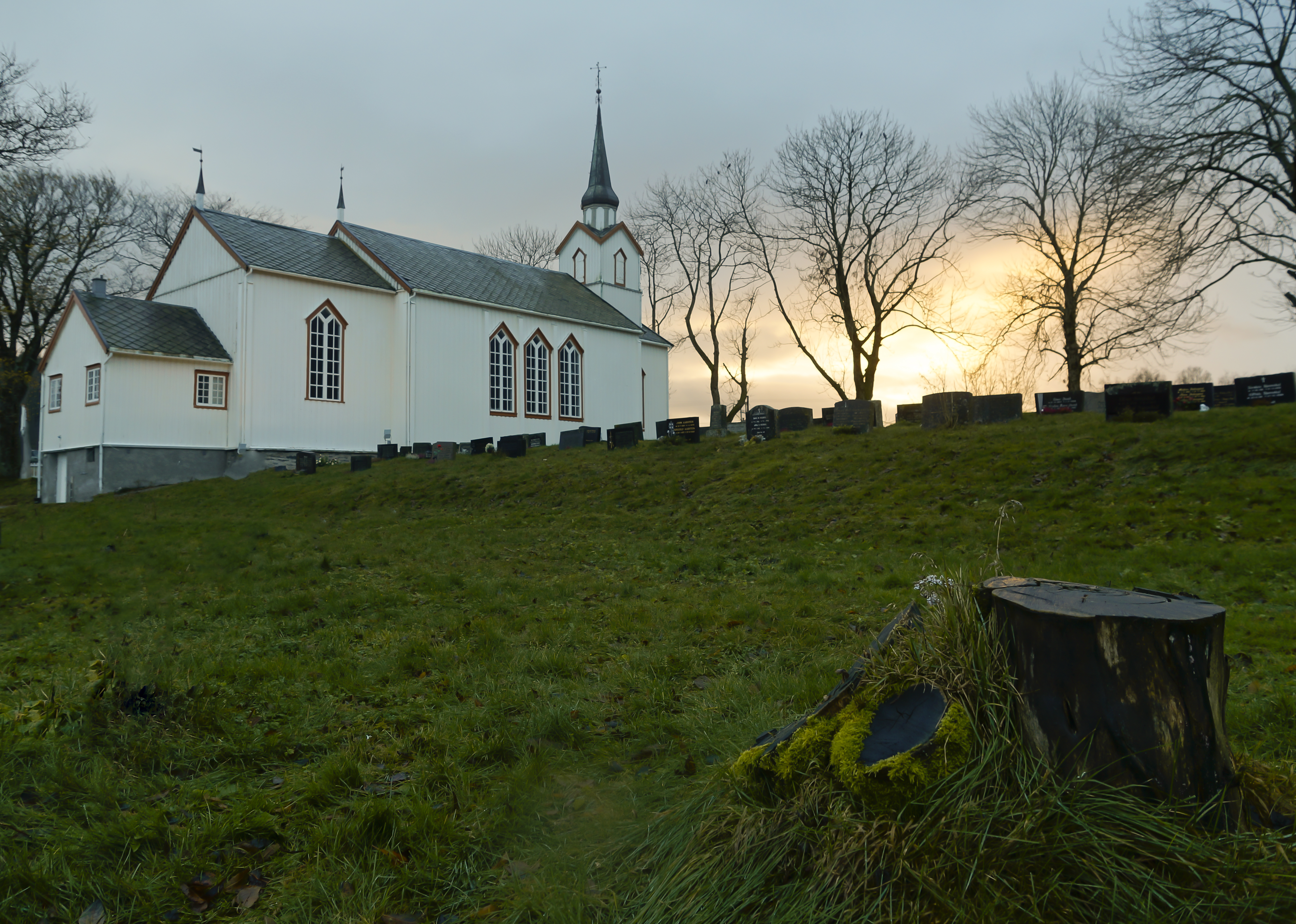

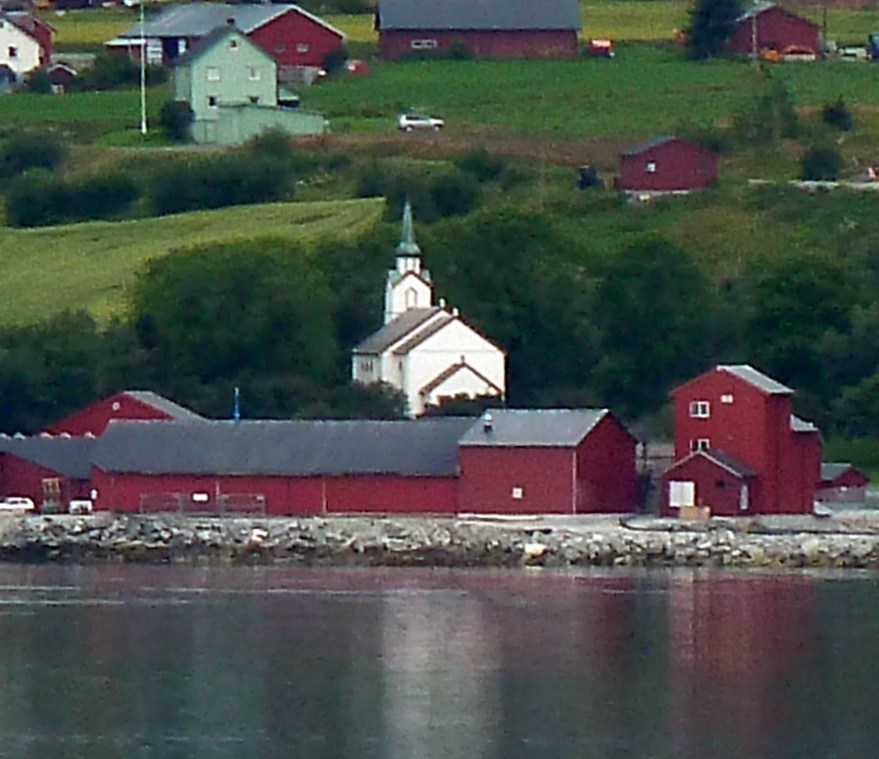

== See also ==
- List of churches in Nidaros
