= Råbygda =

Village in Orkland Municipality, Norway

Råbygda Gjølme
- Village
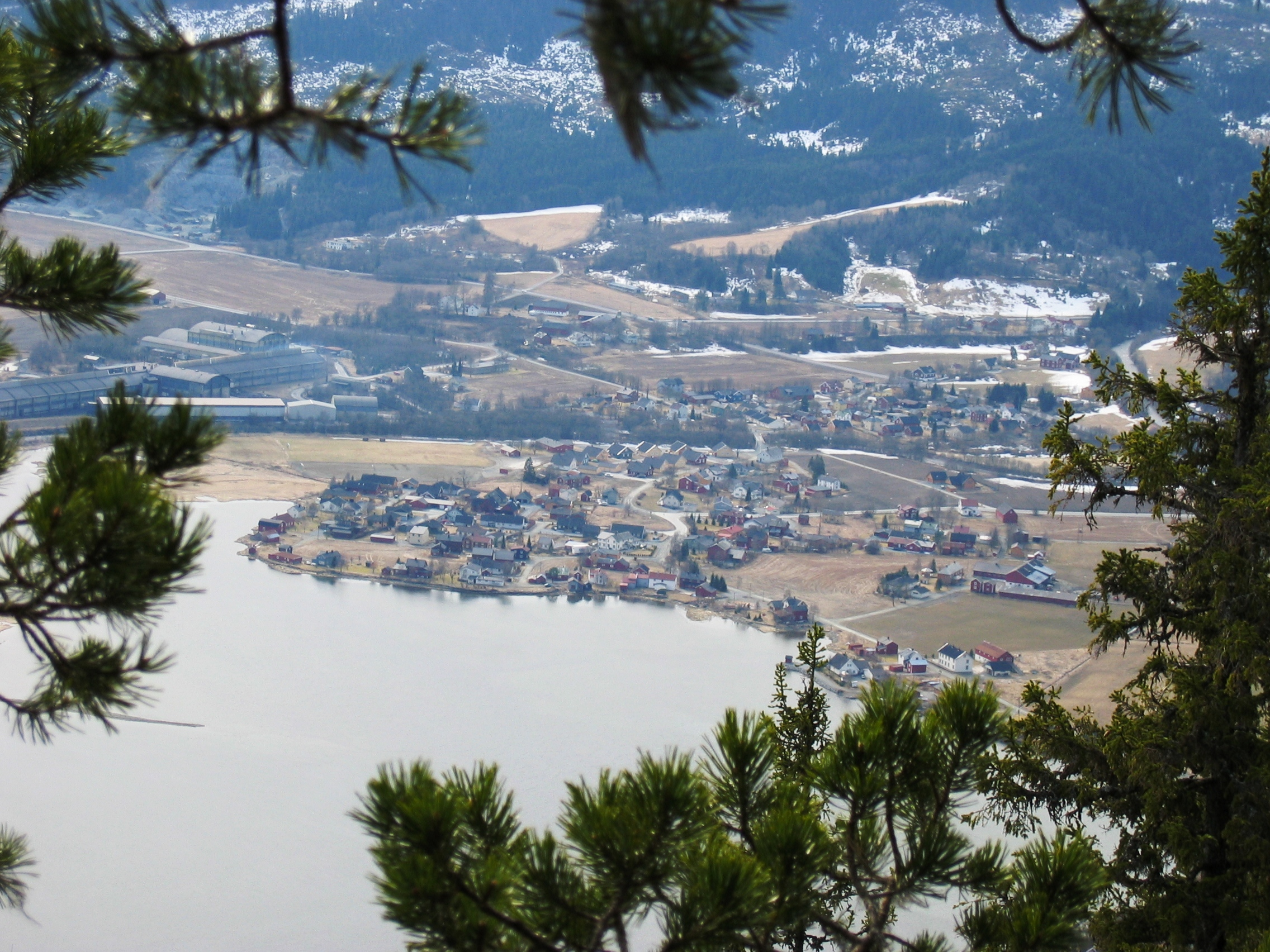
- View of the village
- Interactive map of Råbygda
- Location within Trøndelag Location within Norway
- Coordinates: 63.3161°N 09.8100°E
- Country: Norway
- Region: Central Norway
- County: Trøndelag
- District: Orkdalen
- Municipality: Orkland Municipality

Area
  - Total: 0.61 km^{2} (0.24 sq mi)
- Elevation: 8 m (26 ft)

Population (2012)
  - Total: 521
  - Density: 854/km^{2} (2,210/sq mi)
- Time zone: UTC+01:00 (CET)
  - Summer (DST): UTC+02:00 (CEST)
- Post Code: 7310 Gjølme

Råbygda (or historically: Gjølme) is a village in Orkland Municipality in Trøndelag county, Norway. The village is located on the western shore of the Orkla River, at the mouth of the river. The village lies about 3 kilometres (1.9 mi) west of the centre of the town of Orkanger and about 16 kilometres (9.9 mi) south of the village of Kjøra. There is a silicon carbide factory in the village.

The 0.61-square-kilometre (150-acre) village had a population (2012) of 521 and a population density of 854 inhabitants per square kilometre (2,210/sq mi). Since 2012, the population and area data for this village has not been separately tracked by Statistics Norway. Since 2012, the village has been considered a part of the Orkanger-Fannrem urban area. The name was changed to Råbygda in 2013. Prior to that time, it was called Gjølme.
