= Orkland Municipality =

Municipality in Trøndelag, Norway

Orkland Municipality Orkland kommune
- Municipality
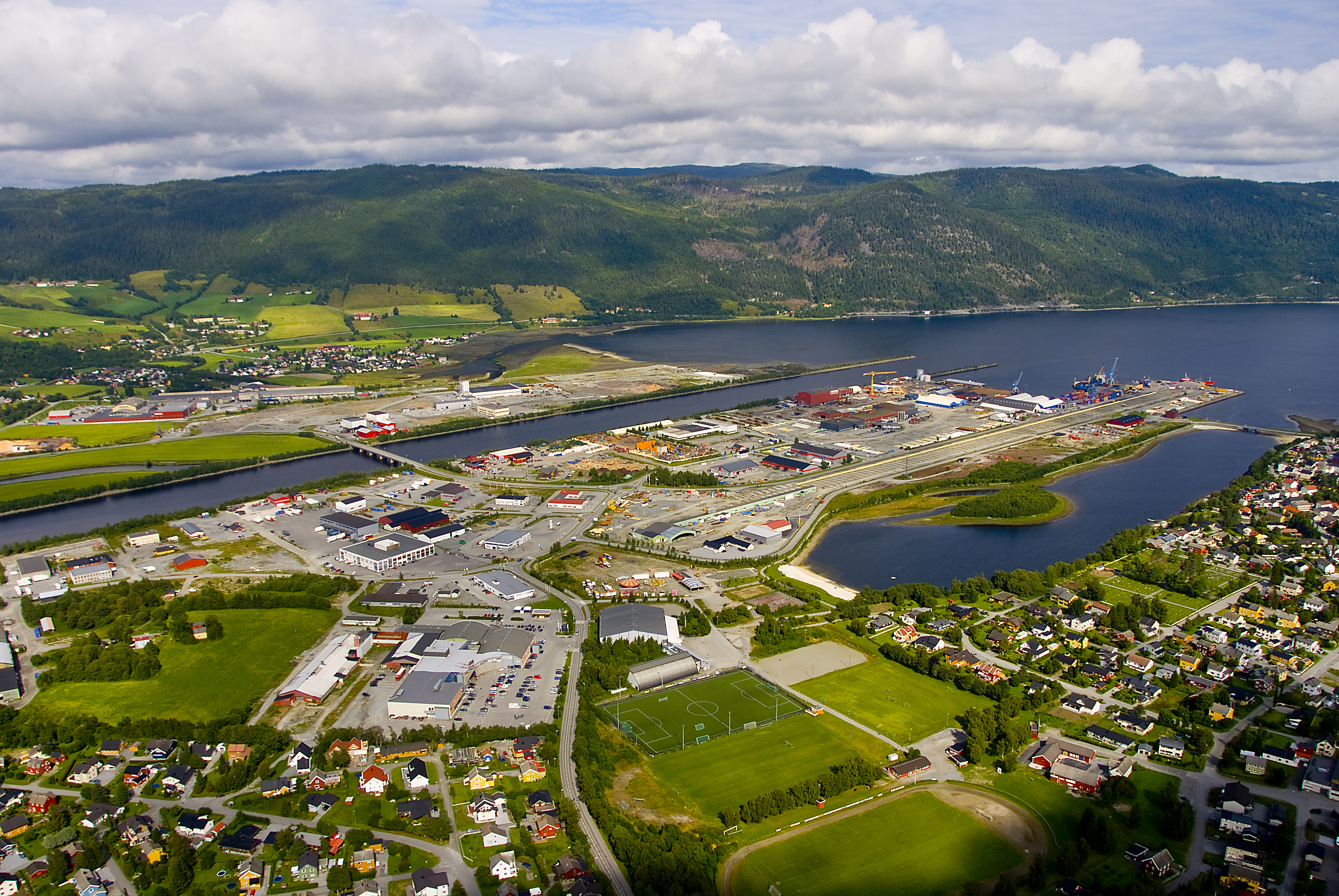
- View of the town of Orkanger

- Coat of arms

- Trøndelag within Norway

- Orkland within Trøndelag
- Coordinates: 63.3067°N 09.8502°E
- Country: Norway
- County: Trøndelag
- District: Orkdalen
- Established: 1 Jan 2020
  - Preceded by: Agdenes, Orkdal, Meldal, and most of Snillfjord
- Administrative centre: Orkanger

Government
  - Mayor (2023): Hanne Nyhus (Ap)

Area
  - Total: 1,906.28 km^{2} (736.02 sq mi)
  - Land: 1,817.77 km^{2} (701.84 sq mi)
  - Water: 88.51 km^{2} (34.17 sq mi) 4.6%
  - Rank: #42 in Norway
- Highest elevation: 1,164.98 m (3,822.1 ft)

Population (2024)
  - Total: 18,793
  - Rank: #71 in Norway
  - Density: 9.9/km^{2} (26/sq mi)
  - Change (10 years): ▲ +2.6%
- Demonym: Orklending

Official language
  - Norwegian form: Neutral
- Time zone: UTC+01:00 (CET)
  - Summer (DST): UTC+02:00 (CEST)
- ISO 3166 code: NO-5059
- Website: Official website

Orkland is a municipality in Trøndelag county, Norway. It is located in the traditional district of Orkdalen. The administrative centre of the municipality is the town of Orkanger. Some of the other notable population centres in the municipality include Å, Bjørnli, Drogsetmoen, Fannrem, Geitastrand, Hoston, Ingdalen, Kjøra, Krokstadøra, Lensvik, Løkken Verk, Meldal, Råbygda, Selbekken, Storås, Svorkmo, Thamshavn, Vassbygda, Vernes, and Vormstad.

The 1,906-square-kilometre (736 sq mi) municipality is the 42nd largest by area out of the 357 municipalities in Norway. Orkland Municipality is the 71st most populous municipality in Norway with a population of 18,793. The municipality's population density is 9.9 inhabitants per square kilometre (26/sq mi) and its population has increased by 2.6% over the previous 10-year period.

== General information ==
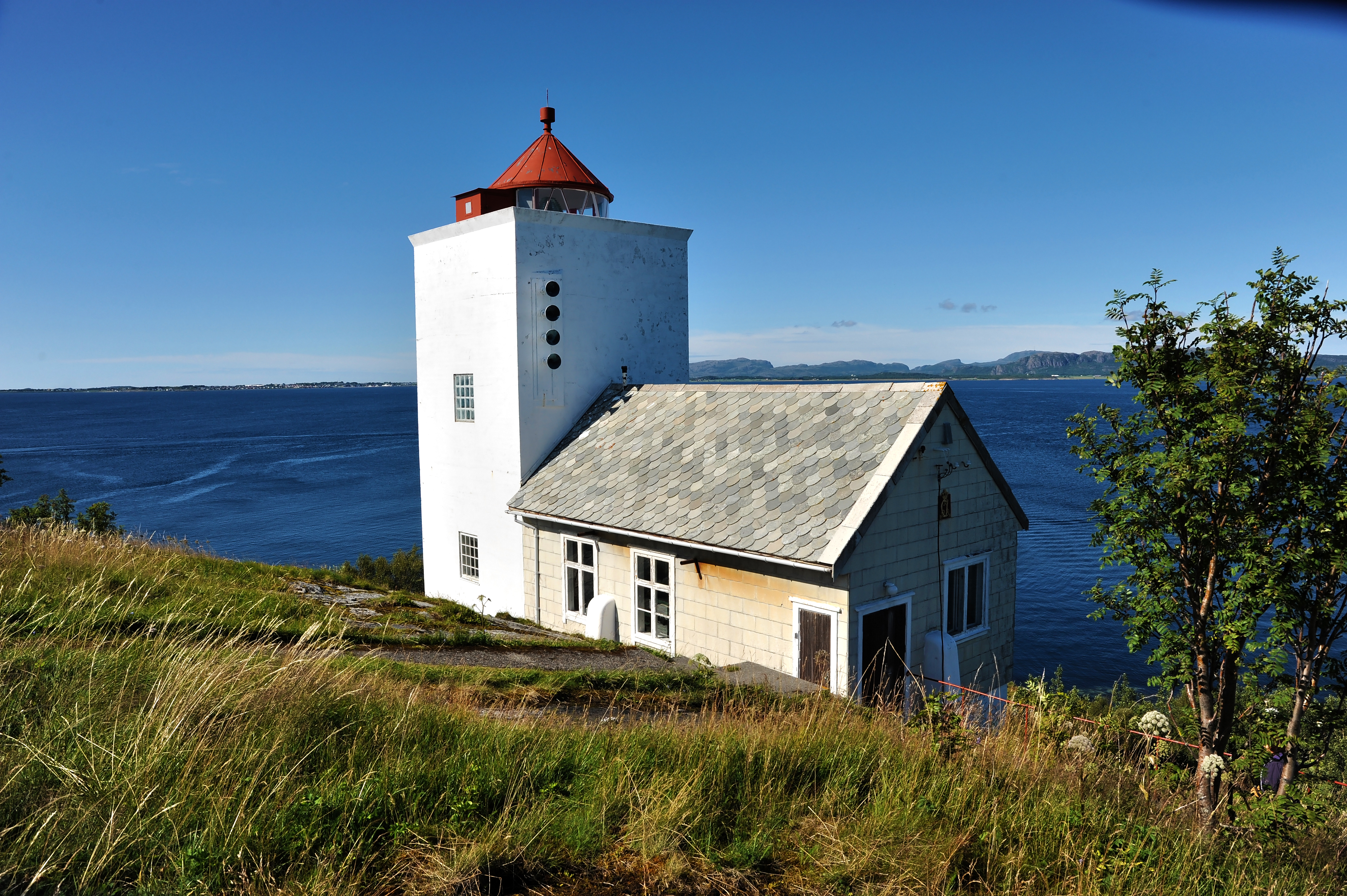
Agdenes Lighthouse

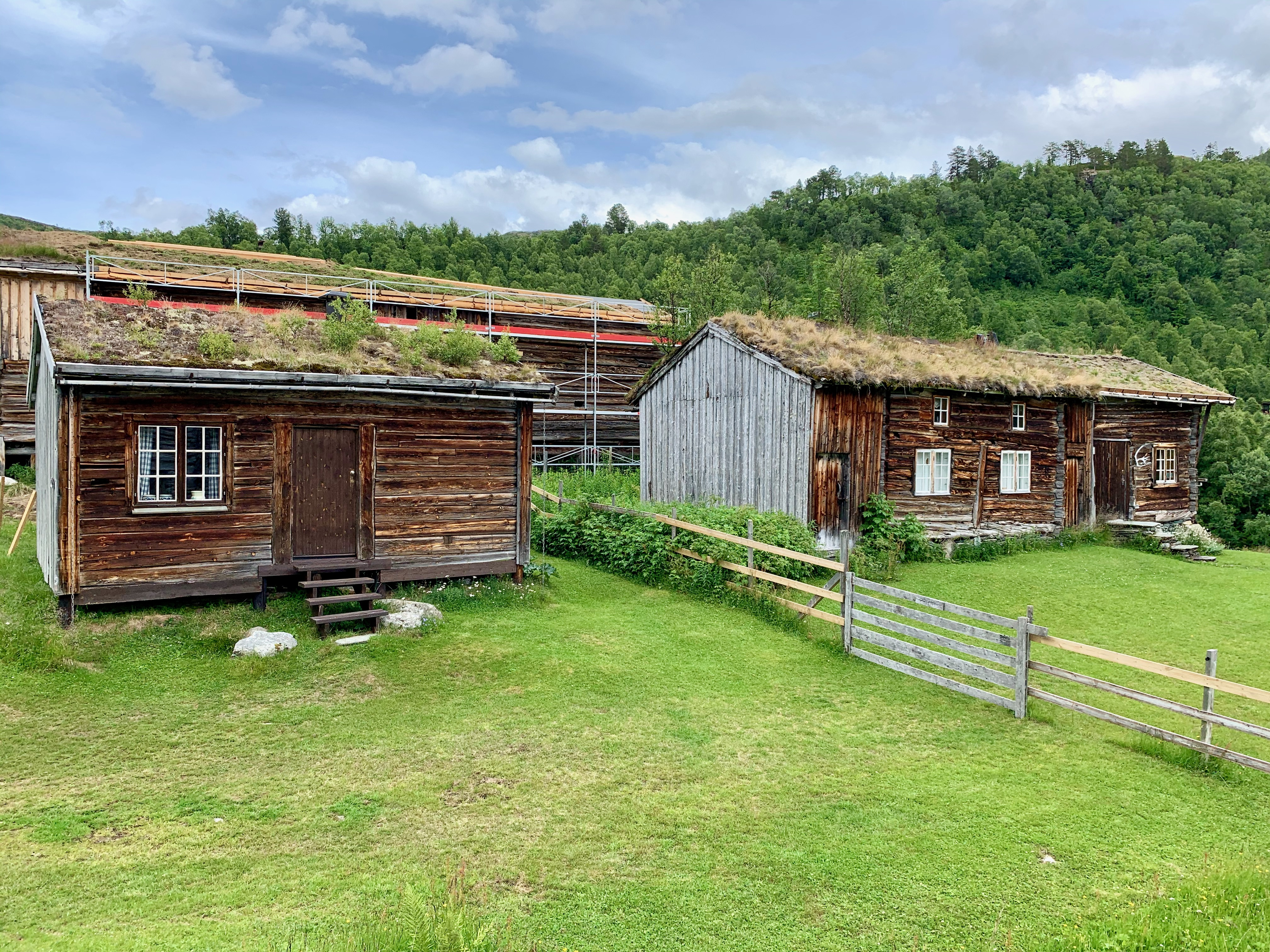
Historic farm in Orkland

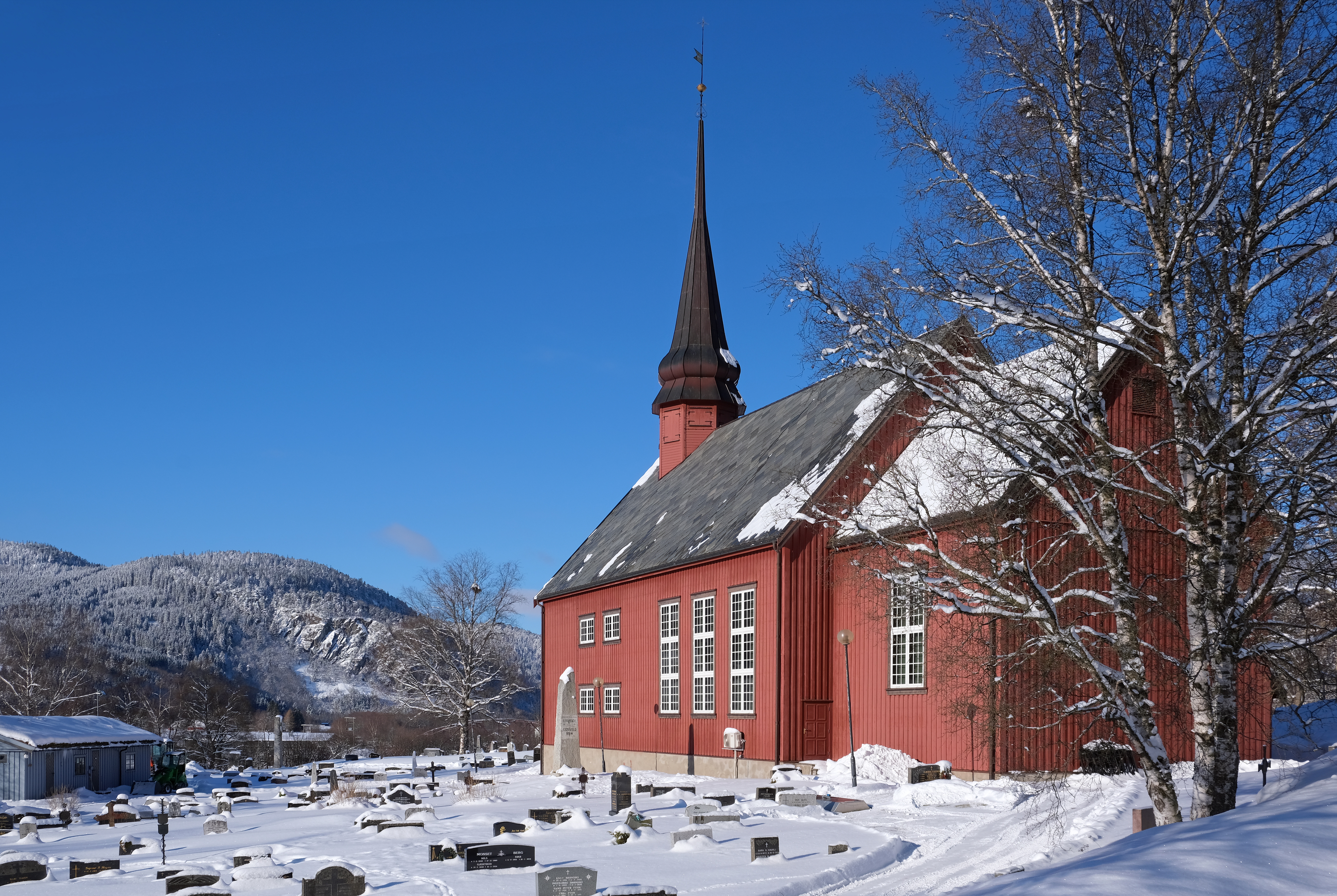
Meldal Church

Orkland Municipality was established on 1 January 2020 after a large municipal merger which combined Agdenes Municipality, Orkdal Municipality, Meldal Municipality, and most of Snillfjord Municipality.

=== Name ===
The municipality is named after the Orkdalen valley (Old Norse: Orkardalr). The first element is the genitive case of the name of the river Ork (now called Orklaelva). The last element is land which means "land". From 1920-1963, there was another Orkland Municipality that existed within the borders of the present-day Orkland Municipality (although the historic one was vastly smaller.

=== Coat of arms ===
The coat of arms for the municipality was approved in 2019. It is somewhat of a combination of the old Coat of arms of Meldal and Coat of arms of Orkdal. The arms are divided horizontally by a wavy line with green above and silver below representing agriculture and forestry (green) and the sea and water (silver). In the centre of the arms there is a gear which represents the industry of the community. The colors of the gear are inverted from the background.

=== Churches ===
The Church of Norway had eight parishes (sokn) within Orkland Municipality. It is part of the Orkdal prosti (deanery) in the Diocese of Nidaros.

Churches in Orkland Municipality
Parish (sokn)	Church Name	Location of the Church	Year built
Agdenes	Agdenes Church	Vernes	1857
Agdenes	Lensvik Church	Lensvik	1863
Agdenes	Ingdal Chapel	Ingdalen	1960
Geitastrand	Geitastrand Church	Geitastrand	1859
Løkken	Løkken Church	Bjørnli	1929
Meldal	Meldal Church	Meldal	1988
Orkanger	Orkanger Church	Orkanger	1892
Orkdal	Orkdal Church	Fannrem	1893
Orkdal	Søvasskjølen Church	Svorksjødalen	1981
Orkland	Moe Church	Vormstad	1867
Snillfjord	Snillfjord Church	Krokstadøra	1898

== Geography ==
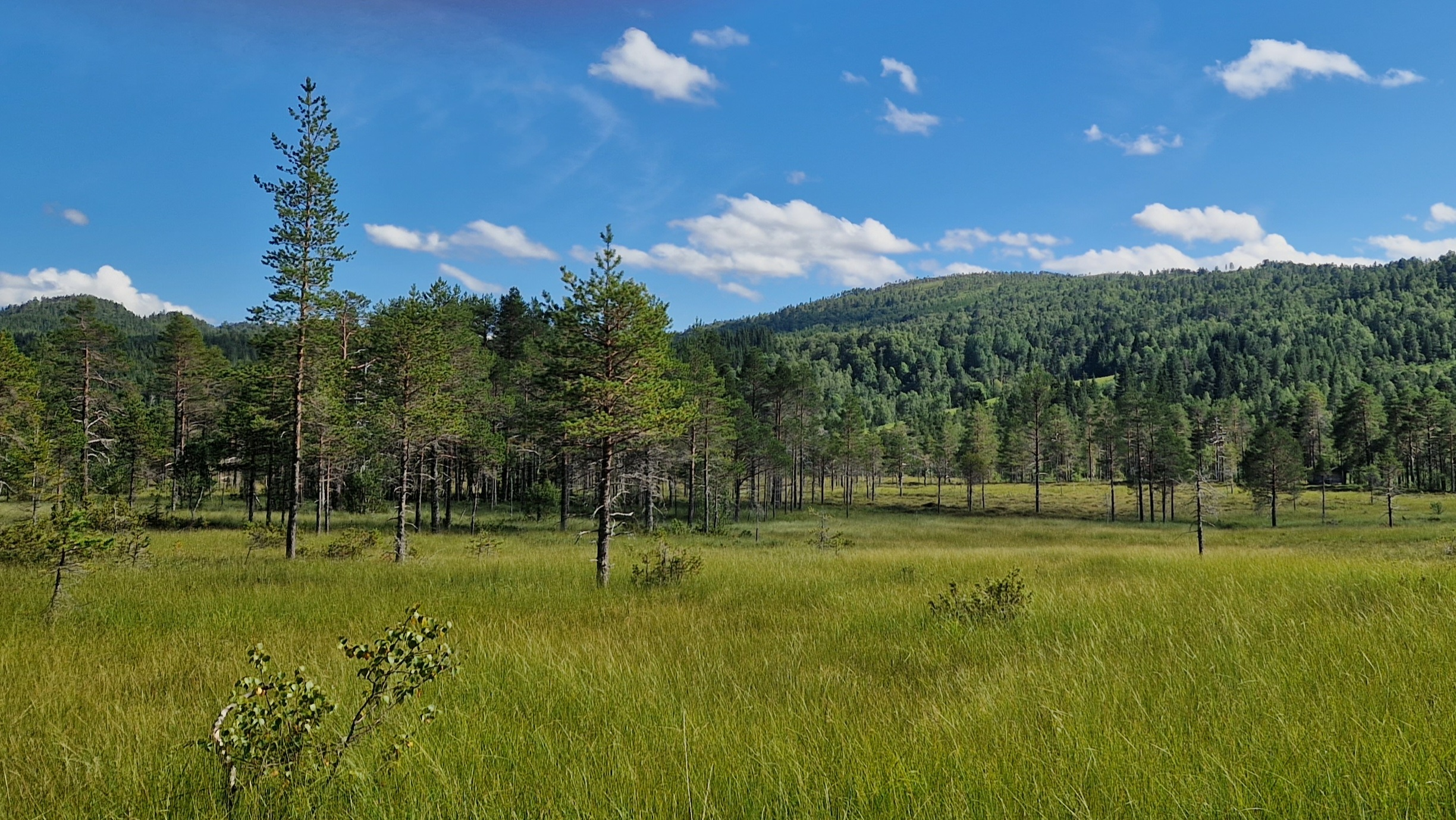
Nature reserve in Orkland

The municipality encompasses a lot of the Orkdalen valley, plus coastal areas along the Trondheimsfjorden and Trondheimsleia. Hitra Municipality, Heim Municipality, and Rindal Municipality are located to the west, Rennebu Municipality is to the south, and Midtre Gauldal Municipality, Melhus Municipality, and Skaun Municipality are located to the east. Trondheim Municipality is located to the east, on the opposite side of the Orkdalsfjorden. Indre Fosen Municipality and Ørland Municipality are both located to the north, across the Trondheimsfjorden. The highest point in the municipality is the 1,164.98-metre (3,822.1 ft) tall mountain Resfjellet, near the border with Rindal Municipality.

== Government ==
Orkland Municipality is responsible for primary education (through 10th grade), outpatient health services, senior citizen services, welfare and other social services, zoning, economic development, and municipal roads and utilities. The municipality is governed by a municipal council of directly elected representatives. The mayor is indirectly elected by a vote of the municipal council. The municipality is under the jurisdiction of the Trøndelag District Court and the Frostating Court of Appeal. Waste management is done by the inter-municipal agency ReMidt, and waste collection is operated by ReTrans Midt.

=== Municipal council ===
The municipal council (Kommunestyre) of Orkland Municipality is made up of 43 representatives that are elected to four year terms. The tables below show the current and historical composition of the council by political party.

Orkland kommunestyre 2023–2027
Party name (in Norwegian)	Number of representatives
Labour Party (Arbeiderpartiet)	12
Progress Party (Fremskrittspartiet)	3
Conservative Party (Høyre)	4
Industry and Business Party (Industri‑ og Næringspartiet)	2
Christian Democratic Party (Kristelig Folkeparti)	1
Pensioners' Party (Pensjonistpartiet)	4
Red Party (Rødt)	1
Centre Party (Senterpartiet)	8
Socialist Left Party (Sosialistisk Venstreparti)	2
Liberal Party (Venstre)	2
Small Town List Orkland (Småbylista Orkland)	4
Total number of members:	43

Orkland kommunestyre 2020–2023
Party name (in Norwegian)	Number of representatives
Labour Party (Arbeiderpartiet)	17
Progress Party (Fremskrittspartiet)	2
Green Party (Miljøpartiet De Grønne)	1
Conservative Party (Høyre)	4
Christian Democratic Party (Kristelig Folkeparti)	1
Pensioners' Party (Pensjonistpartiet)	3
Red Party (Rødt)	1
Centre Party (Senterpartiet)	16
Socialist Left Party (Sosialistisk Venstreparti)	2
Liberal Party (Venstre)	1
Small Town List Orkland (Småbylista Orkland)	3
Total number of members:	51
Note: On 1 January 2020, Agdenes Municipality, Meldal Municipality, Orkdal Municipality, and most of Snillfjord Municipality were merged to form the new Orkland Municipality.

=== Mayors ===
The mayor (Norwegian: ordfører) of Orkland Municipality is the political leader of the municipality and the chairperson of the municipal council. Here is a list of people who have held this position:

- 2020–2023: Oddbjørn Bang (Sp)
- 2023–present: Hanne Nyhus (Ap)

== Notable people ==
- Håkon Hoff (1898 in Orkanger – 1976), a newspaper editor and politician
- Peter Deinboll DSO, MC (1915–1944), an engineer and resistance member during WWII who grew up in Orkanger
- Synnøve Gleditsch (1908–1980), an actress from Agdenes
- Kurt Mosbakk (born 1934), a Norwegian politician who went to school in Orkanger
- Nils Arne Eggen (1941-2022), a footballer and the most successful Norwegian club football manager who was born and lived in Orkdal.
- Knut Torbjørn Eggen (1960-2012), a footballer and football manager who was born and grew up in Orkdal.
