= Fannrem =

Village in Orkland Municipality, Norway

- Village
- Interactive map of Fannrem
- Location within Trøndelag Location within Norway
- Coordinates: 63.2665°N 09.8158°E
- Country: Norway
- Region: Central Norway
- County: Trøndelag
- District: Orkdalen
- Municipality: Orkland Municipality
- Elevation: 16 m (52 ft)
- Time zone: UTC+01:00 (CET)
  - Summer (DST): UTC+02:00 (CEST)
- Post Code: 7320 Fannrem

Fannrem is a village in Orkland Municipality in Trøndelag county, Norway. The village is located along the river Orkla about 5 kilometres (3.1 mi) south of the urban area of Orkanger, Thamshavn, and Råbygda, and about 9 kilometres (5.6 mi) north of the village of Vormstad.

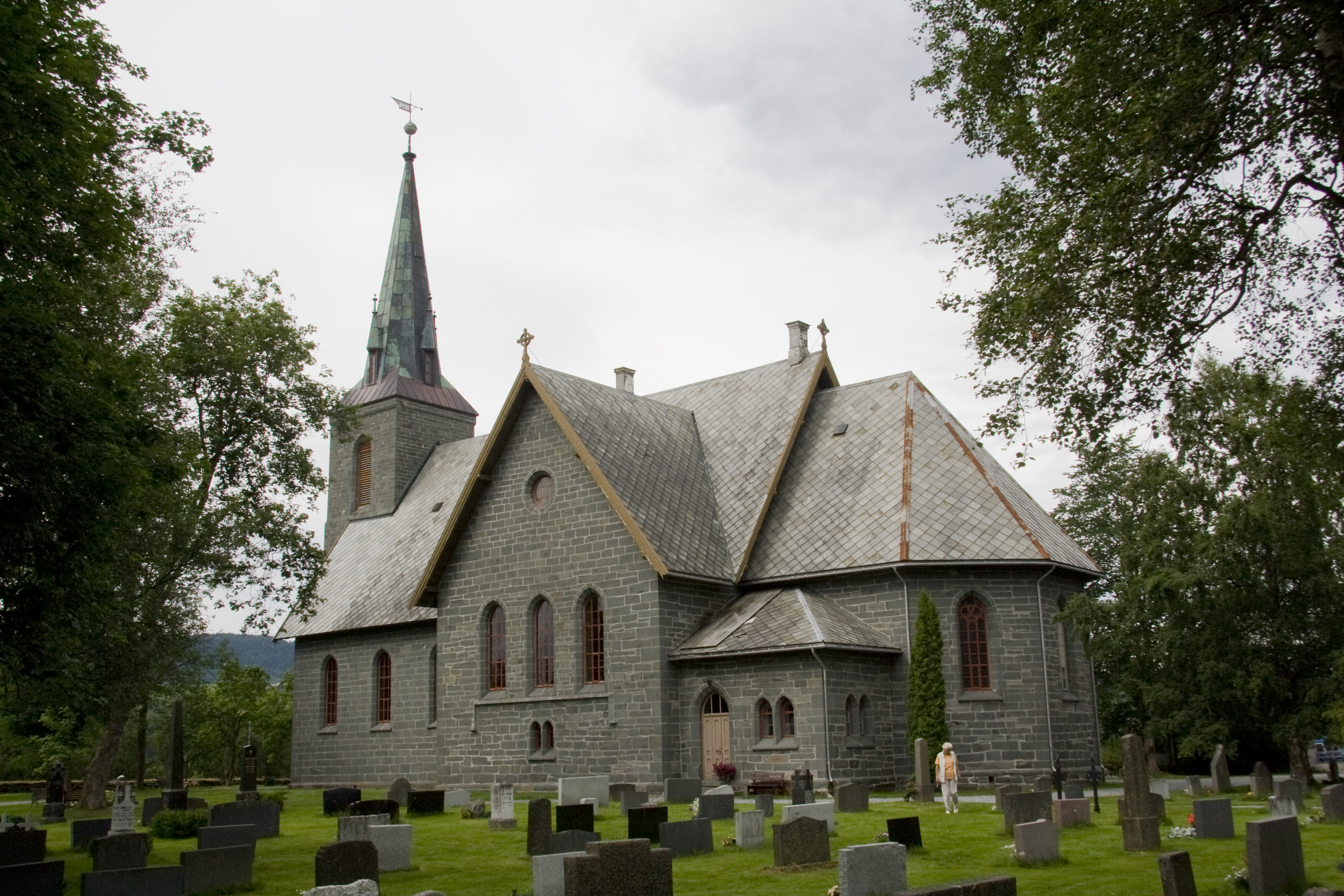
View of Orkdal Church

Due to recent conurbation between the town of Orkanger and the suburb of Fannrem, Statistics Norway regards Orkanger-Fannrem as one 6.85-square-kilometre (2.64 sq mi) community with a population (2024) of 9,161 and a population density of 1,337 inhabitants per square kilometre (3,460/sq mi). Orkanger-Fannrem is one of the largest settlements in Trøndelag county.

The main city center of Fannrem is mainly composed of service industries, surrounded by residential areas and farms. The large Orkel industrial factory is located in Fannrem, which produces machinery for agricultural use. Norgesfôr Orkla, the main grain mill and silo for the Orkdalen region is located in Fannrem. Orkdal Church is located in Fannrem.

== History ==
Fannrem was the administrative centre of the old Orkdal Municipality until 1 January 1963, when the municipalities of Orkanger, Orkland, and Geitastrand were merged into a new Orkdal Municipality. At that time Orkanger became the municipal center.

== Notable people ==
- Ski jumper Roar Ljøkelsøy
- Association football coaches Nils Arne Eggen and Knut Torbjørn Eggen
- Parliamentarian Jorodd Asphjell
