= Selbekken =

Village in Orkland Municipality, Norway

- Village
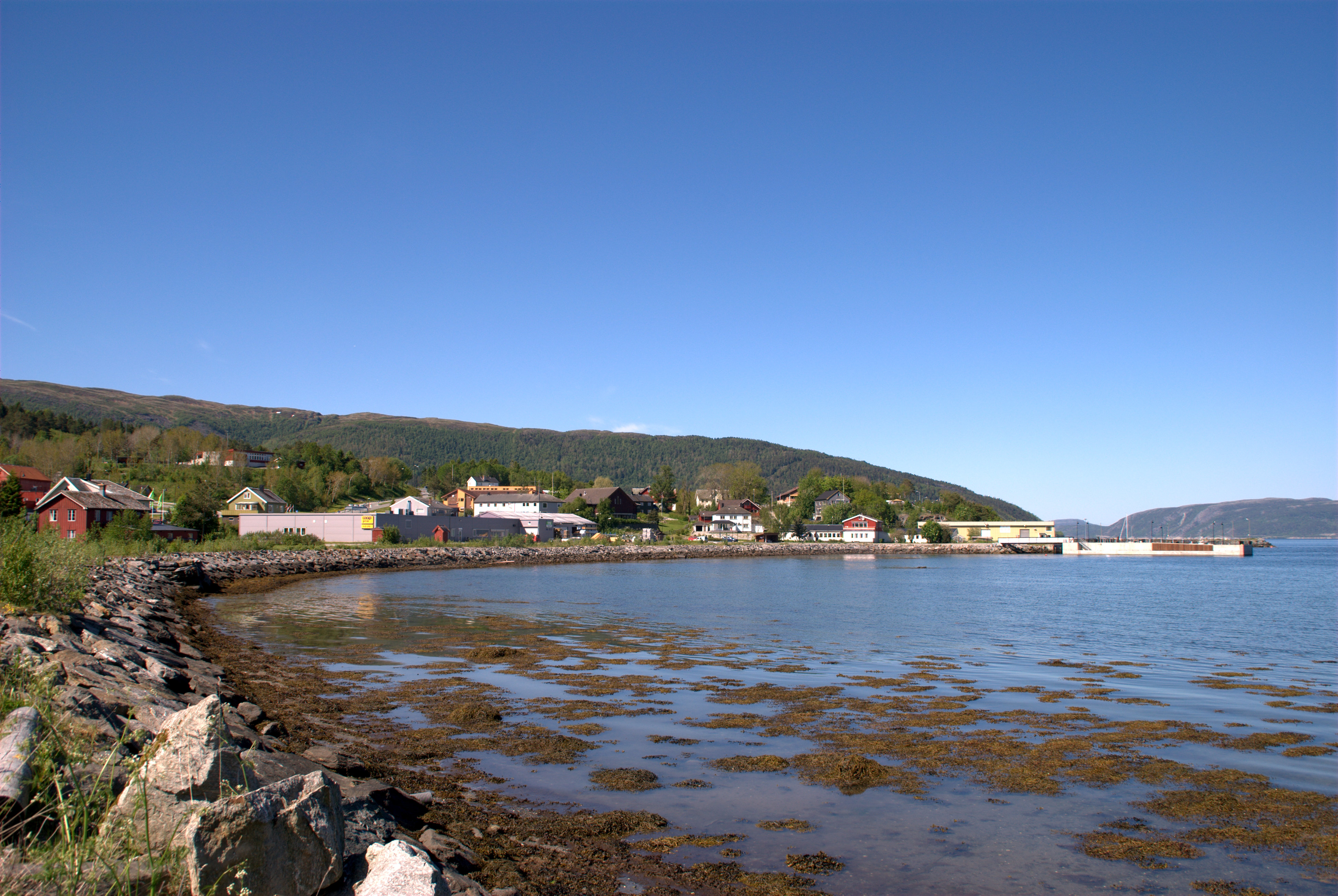
- View of the village
- Interactive map of Selbekken
- Location within Trøndelag Location within Norway
- Coordinates: 63.5042°N 09.8265°E
- Country: Norway
- Region: Central Norway
- County: Trøndelag
- District: Fosen
- Municipality: Orkland Municipality

Area
  - Total: 0.49 km^{2} (0.19 sq mi)
- Elevation: 5 m (16 ft)

Population (2024)
  - Total: 448
  - Density: 914/km^{2} (2,370/sq mi)
- Time zone: UTC+01:00 (CET)
  - Summer (DST): UTC+02:00 (CEST)
- Post Code: 7316 Lensvik

Selbekken is a village in Orkland Municipality in Trøndelag county, Norway. The village is located directly south of the village of Lensvik along the Trondheimsfjorden and the Norwegian County Road 710. The 0.49-square-kilometre (120-acre) village has a population (2024) of 448 and a population density of 914 inhabitants per square kilometre (2,370/sq mi).

The lake Øyangsvatnet lies about 6.5 kilometres (4.0 mi) west of the village, the village of Ingdalen lies about 6 kilometres (3.7 mi) to the south, and the village of Vassbygda lies about 20 kilometres (12 mi) to the north.

== History ==
The village was the administrative centre of the old Agdenes Municipality which existed from 1896 until 2020 when it merged into Orkland Municipality.
