= Stamnan =

Village in Rennebu Municipality, Norway

- Village
- Interactive map of Stamnan
- Location within Trøndelag Location within Norway
- Coordinates: 62.8490°N 09.8561°E
- Country: Norway
- Region: Central Norway
- County: Trøndelag
- District: Orkdalen
- Municipality: Rennebu Municipality
- Elevation: 241 m (791 ft)
- Time zone: UTC+01:00 (CET)
  - Summer (DST): UTC+02:00 (CEST)
- Post Code: 7392 Rennebu

Stamnan is a village in the Orkdalen valley in Rennebu Municipality in Trøndelag county, Norway. The village is located along the Orkla River about 4 kilometres (2.5 mi) south of the village of Voll, about 8 kilometres (5.0 mi) northwest of the municipal centre of Berkåk, and about 20 kilometres (12 mi) east of the mountain village of Nerskogen.
