= Orkland Municipality (1920–1963) =

Former municipality in Trøndelag, Norway

Orkland Municipality Orkland herred
- Former municipality
- Sør-Trøndelag within Norway

- Orkland within Sør-Trøndelag
- Coordinates: 63°11′17″N 09°45′58″E
- Country: Norway
- County: Sør-Trøndelag
- District: Orkdalen
- Established: 1 Jan 1920
  - Preceded by: Orkdal Municipality
- Disestablished: 1 Jan 1963
  - Succeeded by: Orkdal Municipality
- Administrative centre: Vormstad

Government
  - Mayor (1960–1962): John Vormdal (V)

Area (upon dissolution)
  - Total: 168.95 km^{2} (65.23 sq mi)
  - Rank: #415 in Norway
- Highest elevation: 766 m (2,513 ft)

Population (1962)
  - Total: 1,719
  - Rank: #498 in Norway
  - Density: 10.2/km^{2} (26/sq mi)
  - Change (10 years): ▼ −8.1%
- Demonym: Orklending

Official language
  - Norwegian form: Nynorsk
- Time zone: UTC+01:00 (CET)
  - Summer (DST): UTC+02:00 (CEST)
- ISO 3166 code: NO-1637

Orkland is a former municipality in the old Sør-Trøndelag county, Norway. The municipality existed only for a short time, from 1920 until 1963. The 169-square-kilometre (65 sq mi) municipality encompassed the central part of what is now Orkland Municipality in Trøndelag county. The main church of the municipality was Moe Church, just south of the village of Vormstad, the administrative centre of the municipality. Most of the population lived in the Orkdalen valley along the river Orklaelva and near the lake Hostovatnet. The main village areas were Vormstad, Svorkmo, and Hoston.

Prior to its dissolution in 1963, the 169-square-kilometre (65 sq mi) municipality was the 415th largest by area out of the 705 municipalities in Norway. Orkland Municipality was the 498th most populous municipality in Norway with a population of about 1,719. The municipality's population density was 10.2 inhabitants per square kilometre (26/sq mi) and its population had decreased by 8.1% over the previous 10-year period.

== General information ==
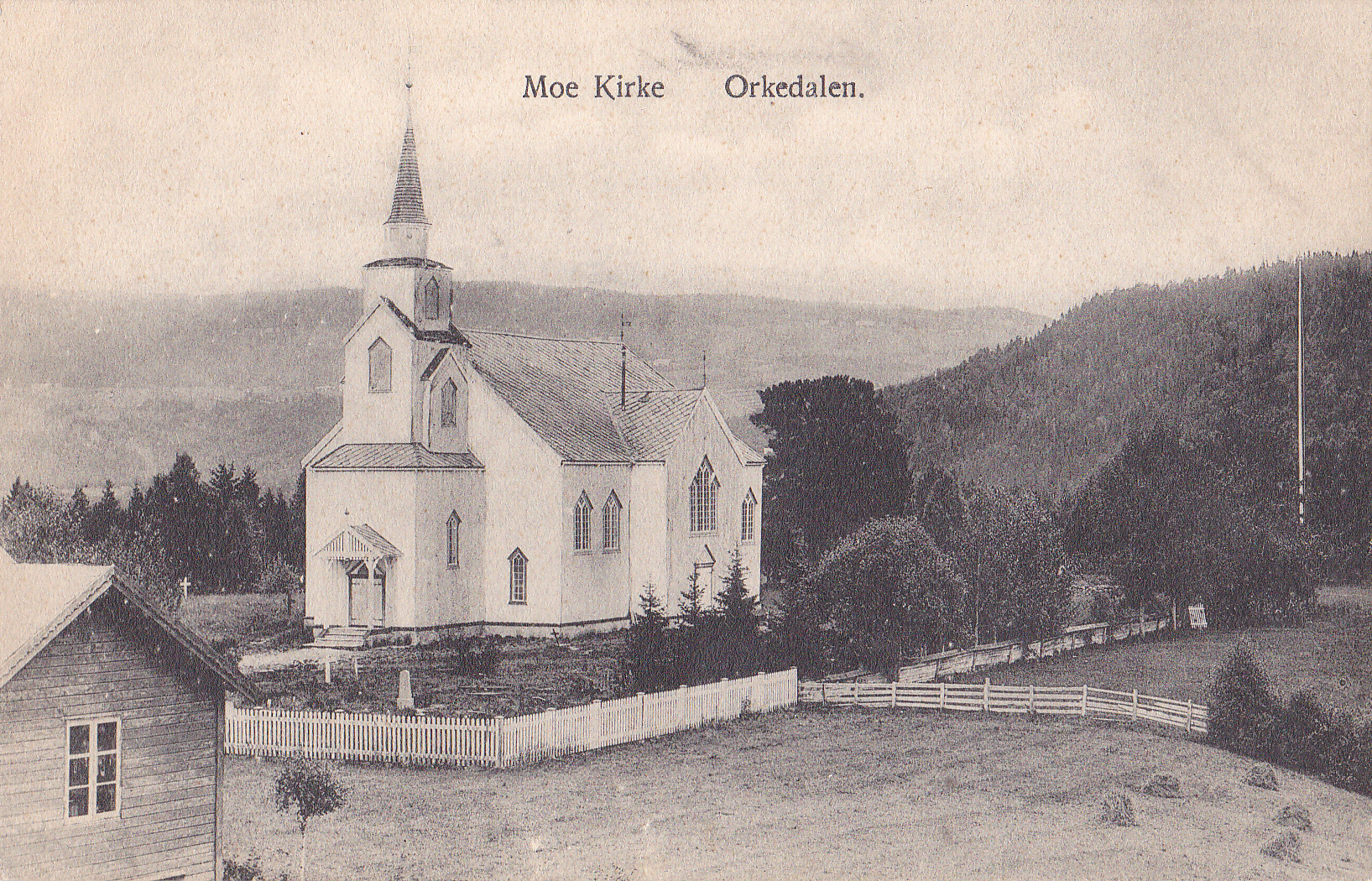
View of the Moe Church in Orkland

Originally part of Orkdal Municipality (see formannskapsdistrikt law), Orkland Municipality was established on 1 July 1920 when it was separated from Orkdal Municipality to form a new municipality of its own. Initially, Orkland Municipality had a population of 1,760.

During the 1960s, there were many municipal mergers across Norway due to the work of the Schei Committee. On 1 January 1963, Orkland Municipality (population: 1,707) was merged with Orkanger Municipality (population: 2,874), Geitastrand Municipality (population: 559), and Orkdal Municipality (population: 4,152) to form a new, larger Orkdal Municipality.

=== Name ===
The municipality is named after the Orkdalen valley (Old Norse: Orkardalr). The first element is the genitive case of the name of the river Ork (now called Orklaelva). The last element is land which means "land".

=== Churches ===
The Church of Norway had one parish (sokn) within Orkland Municipality. At the time of the municipal dissolution, it was part of the Orkdal prestegjeld and the Orkdal prosti (deanery) in the Diocese of Nidaros.

Churches in Orkland Municipality
Parish (sokn)	Church name	Location of the church	Year built
Orkland	Moe Church	Vormstad	1867

== Geography ==
The municipality was located in the Orkdalen valley, about 45 kilometres (28 mi) southwest of the city of Trondheim. Orkdal Municipality was located to the north, Skaun Municipality and Hølonda Municipality were to the east, Meldal Municipality was to the south, and Rindal Municipality (in Møre og Romsdal county) was to the west. The highest point in the municipality was the 766-metre (2,513 ft) tall mountain Jolifjellet, on the border with Rindal Municipality.

== Government ==
While it existed, Orkland Municipality was responsible for primary education (through 10th grade), outpatient health services, senior citizen services, welfare and other social services, zoning, economic development, and municipal roads and utilities. The municipality was governed by a municipal council of directly elected representatives. The mayor was indirectly elected by a vote of the municipal council. The municipality was under the jurisdiction of the Frostating Court of Appeal.

=== Municipal council ===
The municipal council (Heradsstyre) of Orkland Municipality was made up of representatives that were elected to four year terms. The tables below show the historical composition of the council by political party.

Orkland heradsstyre 1959–1963
Party name (in Nynorsk)	Number of representatives
Labour Party (Arbeidarpartiet)	6
Christian Democratic Party (Kristeleg Folkeparti)	3
Centre Party (Senterpartiet)	5
Liberal Party (Venstre)	3
Total number of members:	17

Orkland heradsstyre 1955–1959
Party name (in Nynorsk)	Number of representatives
Labour Party (Arbeidarpartiet)	7
Christian Democratic Party (Kristeleg Folkeparti)	2
Farmers' Party (Bondepartiet)	4
Liberal Party (Venstre)	3
Local List(s) (Lokale lister)	1
Total number of members:	17

Orkland heradsstyre 1951–1955
Party name (in Nynorsk)	Number of representatives
Labour Party (Arbeidarpartiet)	6
Christian Democratic Party (Kristeleg Folkeparti)	2
Farmers' Party (Bondepartiet)	4
Liberal Party (Venstre)	4
Total number of members:	16

Orkland heradsstyre 1947–1951
Party name (in Nynorsk)	Number of representatives
Labour Party (Arbeidarpartiet)	5
Christian Democratic Party (Kristeleg Folkeparti)	2
Farmers' Party (Bondepartiet)	4
Liberal Party (Venstre)	5
Total number of members:	16

Orkland heradsstyre 1945–1947
Party name (in Nynorsk)	Number of representatives
Labour Party (Arbeidarpartiet)	5
Christian Democratic Party (Kristeleg Folkeparti)	2
Farmers' Party (Bondepartiet)	4
Liberal Party (Venstre)	5
Total number of members:	16

Orkland heradsstyre 1937–1941*
Party name (in Nynorsk)	Number of representatives
Labour Party (Arbeidarpartiet)	5
Farmers' Party (Bondepartiet)	4
Liberal Party (Venstre)	7
Total number of members:	16
Note: Due to the German occupation of Norway during World War II, no elections were held for new municipal councils until after the war ended in 1945.

=== Mayors ===
The mayor (Nynorsk: ordførar) of Orkland Municipality was the political leader of the municipality and the chairperson of the municipal council. Here is a list of people who held this position:

- 1920–1925: Ole T. Hongslo (V)
- 1926–1928: Ingebrigt Bakken (V)
- 1929–1934: Arnt Vormdal (V)
- 1935–1937: Ole Holte (Bp)
- 1938–1941: Arnt Vormdal (V)
- 1941–1945: Ole O. Klingen (NS)
- 1945–1945: Arnt Vormdal (V)
- 1946–1959: Knut K. Holte (V)
- 1960–1962: John Vormdal (V)

== See also ==
- List of former municipalities of Norway
