= Geitastrand Municipality =

Former municipality in Trøndelag, Norway

Geitastrand Municipality Geitastrand herred
- Former municipality
- Gjeitastrand herred (historic name); Gjeitastranden herred (historic name)
- Sør-Trøndelag within Norway

- Geitastrand within Sør-Trøndelag
- Coordinates: 63°21′54″N 09°55′31″E
- Country: Norway
- County: Sør-Trøndelag
- District: Orkdalen
- Established: 1 Jan 1905
  - Preceded by: Børsa Municipality
- Disestablished: 1 Jan 1963
  - Succeeded by: Orkdal Municipality
- Administrative centre: Geitastrand

Government
  - Mayor (1960–1962): Bengt Haugness (Bp)

Area (upon dissolution)
  - Total: 118.96 km^{2} (45.93 sq mi)
  - Rank: #489 in Norway
- Highest elevation: 611 m (2,005 ft)

Population (1962)
  - Total: 561
  - Rank: #689 in Norway
  - Density: 4.7/km^{2} (12/sq mi)
  - Change (10 years): ▼ −15.1%
- Demonym: Geitastranding

Official language
  - Norwegian form: Nynorsk
- Time zone: UTC+01:00 (CET)
  - Summer (DST): UTC+02:00 (CEST)
- ISO 3166 code: NO-1659

Geitastrand is a former municipality in the old Sør-Trøndelag county in Norway. The 119-square-kilometre (46 sq mi) municipality existed from 1905 until 1963 in an area that is now part of Orkland Municipality in Trøndelag county. It encompassed the coastal area along the Trondheimsfjord between the town of Orkanger in the south to the Ingdalen valley in the north. The district was thinly populated, and has no significant urban areas. The administrative centre of the municipality was the village of Geitastrand where the Geitastrand Church is located. The Byneset area of the city of Trondheim is located across the fjord to the east from where Geitastrand was located.

Prior to its dissolution in 1963, the 119-square-kilometre (46 sq mi) municipality was the 489th largest by area out of the 705 municipalities in Norway. Geitastrand Municipality was the 689th most populous municipality in Norway with a population of about 561. The municipality's population density was 4.7 inhabitants per square kilometre (12/sq mi) and its population had decreased by 15.1% over the previous 10-year period.

== General information ==
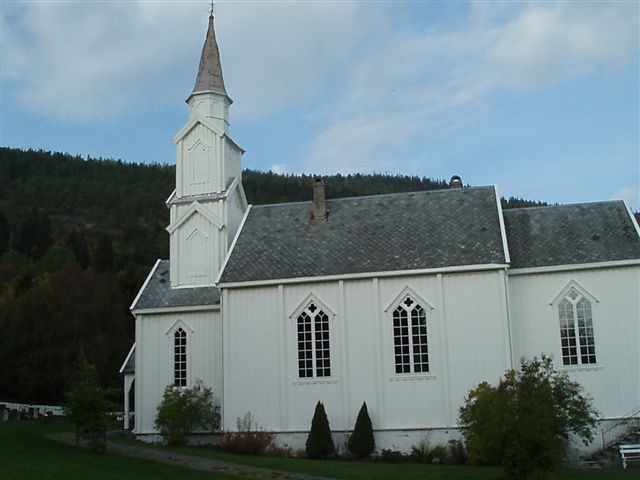
Geitastrand Church

The municipality of Geitastrand was established on 1 January 1905 when it was separated from Børsa Municipality. Initially, Geitastrand Municipality had a population of 674. During the 1960s, there were many municipal mergers across Norway due to the work of the Schei Committee. On 1 January 1963, Geitastrand Municipality (population: 559) was merged with Orkanger Municipality (population: 2,874), Orkland Municipality (population: 1,707), and Orkdal Municipality (population: 4,152) to form a new, larger Orkdal Municipality.

=== Name ===
The municipality is named Geitastrand after the old name for the area along the west shore of the Orkdalsfjorden. The name comes from the old Geita farm which is located at the headland where the Orkdalsfjorden and Trondheimsfjorden meet. The first element is derived from geit which means "goat". The last element comes from the word strǫnd which means "shoreline". Historically, the name of the municipality was spelled Gjeitestranden. On 3 November 1917, a royal resolution changed the spelling of the name of the municipality to Gjeitestrand, removing the definite form ending -en. On 1 October 1921, the spelling of the name was changed to Geitastrand.

=== Churches ===
The Church of Norway had one parish (sokn) within Geitastrand Municipality. At the time of the municipal dissolution, it was part of the Børsa prestegjeld and the Orkdal prosti (deanery) in the Diocese of Nidaros.

Churches in Geitastrand Municipality
Parish (sokn)	Church name	Location of the church	Year built
Geitastrand	Geitastrand Church	Geitastrand	1859

== Geography ==
The municipality was located on the southwest side of the Trondheimsfjorden and Orkdalfjorden, about 25 kilometres (16 mi) west of the city of Trondheim. Stadsbygd Municipality was located to the north, Snillfjord Municipality was to the northwest, and Orkdal Municipality was to the southwest. Both Børsa Municipality and Byneset Municipality were located to the east on the other side of the fjord. The highest point in the municipality was the 611-metre (2,005 ft) tall mountain Vargheia.

== Government ==
While it existed, Geitastrand Municipality was responsible for primary education (through 10th grade), outpatient health services, senior citizen services, welfare and other social services, zoning, economic development, and municipal roads and utilities. The municipality was governed by a municipal council of directly elected representatives. The mayor was indirectly elected by a vote of the municipal council. The municipality was under the jurisdiction of the Frostating Court of Appeal.

=== Municipal council ===
The municipal council (Heradsstyre) of Geitastrand Municipality was made up of 13 representatives that were elected to four year terms. The tables below show the historical composition of the council by political party.

Geitastrand heradsstyre 1959–1962
Party name (in Nynorsk)	Number of representatives
Labour Party (Arbeidarpartiet)	4
Conservative Party (Høgre)	1
Centre Party (Senterpartiet)	6
Liberal Party (Venstre)	2
Total number of members:	13

Geitastrand heradsstyre 1955–1959
Party name (in Nynorsk)	Number of representatives
Labour Party (Arbeidarpartiet)	5
Conservative Party (Høgre)	1
Christian Democratic Party (Kristeleg Folkeparti)	1
Farmers' Party (Bondepartiet)	5
Liberal Party (Venstre)	1
Total number of members:	13

Geitastrand heradsstyre 1951–1955
Party name (in Nynorsk)	Number of representatives
Labour Party (Arbeidarpartiet)	5
Christian Democratic Party (Kristeleg Folkeparti)	1
Farmers' Party (Bondepartiet)	4
Liberal Party (Venstre)	2
Total number of members:	12

Geitastrand heradsstyre 1947–1951
Party name (in Nynorsk)	Number of representatives
Labour Party (Arbeidarpartiet)	5
Christian Democratic Party (Kristeleg Folkeparti)	1
Farmers' Party (Bondepartiet)	3
Liberal Party (Venstre)	3
Total number of members:	12

Geitastrand heradsstyre 1945–1947
Party name (in Nynorsk)	Number of representatives
Labour Party (Arbeidarpartiet)	4
Christian Democratic Party (Kristeleg Folkeparti)	2
Farmers' Party (Bondepartiet)	4
Liberal Party (Venstre)	2
Total number of members:	12

Geitastrand heradsstyre 1937–1941*
Party name (in Nynorsk)	Number of representatives
Labour Party (Arbeidarpartiet)	4
Farmers' Party (Bondepartiet)	4
Liberal Party (Venstre)	4
Total number of members:	12
Note: Due to the German occupation of Norway during World War II, no elections were held for new municipal councils until after the war ended in 1945.

=== Mayors ===
The mayor (Nynorsk: ordførar) of Geitastrand Municipality was the political leader of the municipality and the chairperson of the municipal council. Here is a list of people who held this position:

- 1905–1910: John Wormdal (H)
- 1911–1931: Ludvig Meland (V)
- 1932–1937: Elling Kvernmo (Bp)
- 1938–1941: Ola Bjørnbet (Bp)
- 1942–1942: Emil Carlsen (NS)
- 1942–1945: Nils Johnsen Kvernmo (NS)
- 1946–1947: Ola Bjørnbet (Bp)
- 1948–1951: Reidar Kvernmo (Bp)
- 1952–1955: Ola Bjørnbet (Bp)
- 1956–1959: Reidar Kvernmo (Bp)
- 1960–1962: Bengt Haugness (Bp)

== See also ==
- List of former municipalities of Norway
