= Rennebu =

Rennebu may refer to:

== Places ==
- Rennebu Municipality, a municipality in Trøndelag county, Norway
- Rennebu, an older name for Voll, a village in Rennebu Municipality in Trøndelag county, Norway
- Rennebu Church, a church in Rennebu Municipality in Trøndelag county, Norway

== Other ==
- Rennebu IL, a sports club based in Rennebu Municipality in Trøndelag county, Norway
