= Nerskogen =

Nerskogen may refer to:

== Places ==
- Nerskogen, Finnmark, a village in Alta municipality in Finnmark county, Norway
- Nerskogen, Trøndelag, a village in Rennebu municipality in Trøndelag county, Norway
- Nerskogen Chapel, a church in Rennebu municipality in Trøndelag county, Norway
