= Ilfjellet =

Mountain in Rennebu, Norway

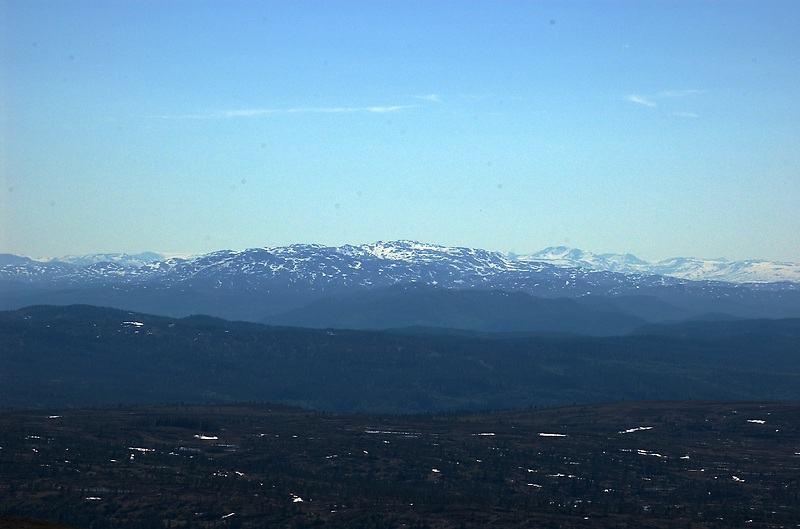
- Ilfjellet seen from Kråkfjellet (north east)

Highest point
- Elevation: 1,218 m (3,996 ft)
- Prominence: 790 m (2,590 ft)
- Coordinates: 62.9456°N 09.9414°E

Geography
- Interactive map of the mountain
- Location: Trøndelag, Norway
- Topo map: 1520 I Rennebu

Ilfjellet is a mountain in Rennebu Municipality in Trøndelag county, Norway. It is located in the northeastern part of the municipality, about 13 kilometres (8.1 mi) north of the municipal center of Berkåk and 10 kilometres (6.2 mi) southeast of Å in neighboring Orkland Municipality. The mountain is 1,218 metres (3,996 ft) tall.

== Name ==
The mountain is named after the river Ila. The last element is the finite form of fjell which means "fell" or "mountain". The river name is derived from Old Norse íla which means "spring".
