= Geitastrand =

Village in Orkland Municipality, Norway

Geitastrand Geitastranda
- Village
- Interactive map of Geitastrand
- Location within Trøndelag Location within Norway
- Coordinates: 63.36619°N 9.92852°E
- Country: Norway
- Region: Central Norway
- County: Trøndelag
- District: Orkdalen
- Municipality: Orkland Municipality
- Elevation: 3 m (9.8 ft)
- Time zone: UTC+01:00 (CET)
  - Summer (DST): UTC+02:00 (CEST)
- Post Code: 7303 Orkanger

Geitastrand is a village in Orkland Municipality in Trøndelag county, Norway. The village is located along the west shore of the Orkdalsfjorden, about 10 kilometres (6.2 mi) north of the town of Orkanger.

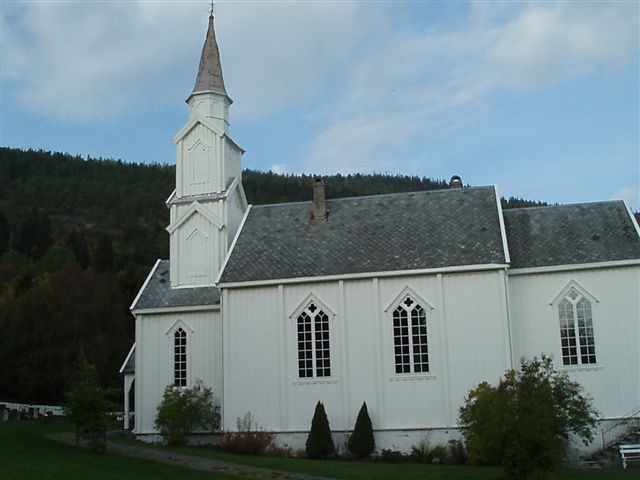
View of Geitastrand Church

The village was the administrative centre of the old Geitastrand Municipality which existed from 1905-1963 when it became part of Orkdal Municipality. Geitastrand Church is located in the village.
