= Vormstad =

Village in Orkland Municipality, Norway

- Village
- Interactive map of Vormstad
- Location within Trøndelag Location within Norway
- Coordinates: 63.1997°N 09.7699°E
- Country: Norway
- Region: Central Norway
- County: Trøndelag
- District: Orkdalen
- Municipality: Orkland Municipality

Area
  - Total: 0.33 km^{2} (0.13 sq mi)
- Elevation: 30 m (98 ft)

Population (2012)
  - Total: 311
  - Density: 942/km^{2} (2,440/sq mi)
- Time zone: UTC+01:00 (CET)
  - Summer (DST): UTC+02:00 (CEST)
- Post Code: 7327 Svorkmo

Vormstad is a village in Orkland Municipality in Trøndelag county, Norway. The village is located along the Orkla River between the villages of Svorkmo and Fannrem. The village of Hoston lies about 9 kilometres (5.6 mi) west of Vormstad.

The 0.33-square-kilometre (82-acre) village had a population (2012) of 311 and a population density of 942 inhabitants per square kilometre (2,440/sq mi). Since 2012, the population and area data for this village area has not been separately tracked by Statistics Norway.

Vormstad is a centre for salmon fishing in the Orkla River, and the population increases many times through the fishing season in June, July, and August. Moe Church is located just south of Vormstad.

== History ==
The name of the village comes from the river Vorma which flows into the Orkla River at Vormstad. The village was the municipal center of the old Orkland Municipality which existed from 1920-1963 (and it was much smaller than the present-day Orkland Municipality).
