= Berkåk station =

Railway station in Rennebu, Norway

Berkåk Station Berkåk stasjon
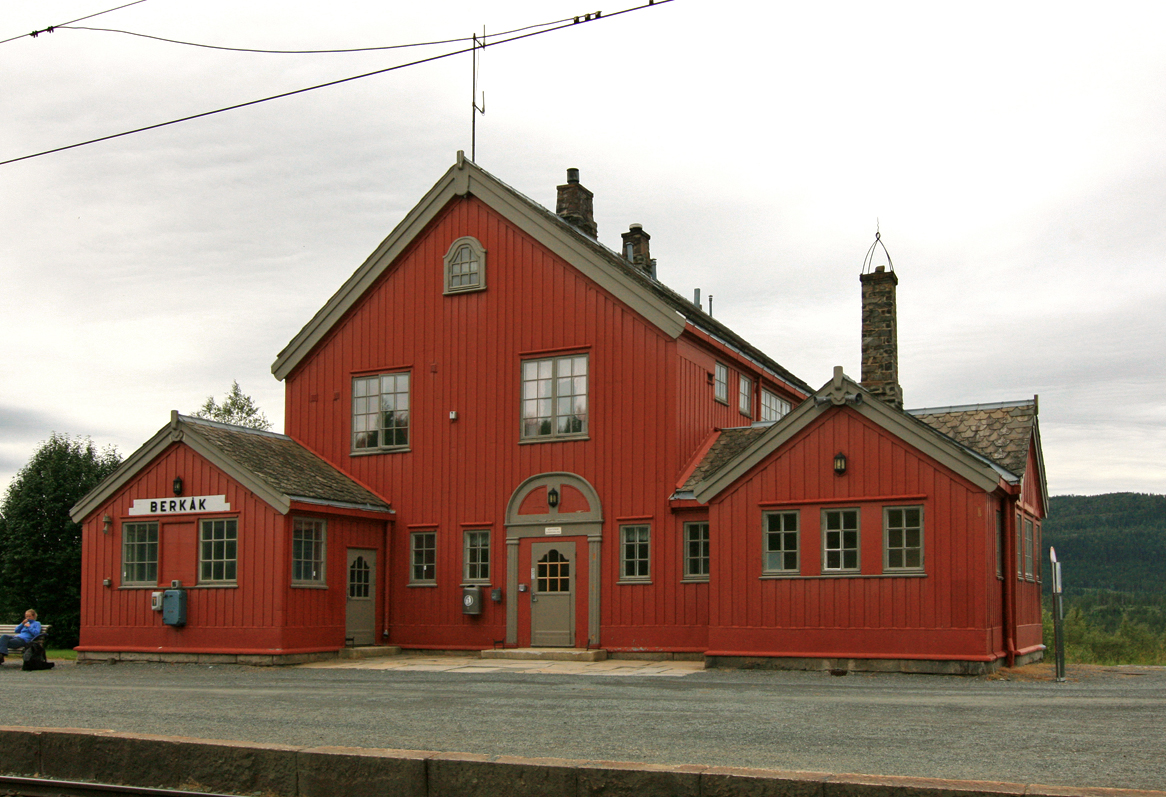
- View of the station

General information
- Location: Berkåk; Rennebu Municipality, Trøndelag; Norway
- Coordinates: 62°49′20″N 10°00′58″E
- Elevation: 430 m (1,410 ft)
- System: Railway station
- Owner: Bane NOR
- Operator: SJ Norge
- Line: Dovrebanen
- Distance: 466.35 km (289.78 mi)
- Platforms: 2
- Connections: Bus: AtB

Other information
- Station code: BÅK

History
- Opened: 1921
Location
- Location within Trøndelag Location within Norway

Berkåk Station (Norwegian: Berkåk stasjon) is a railway station located in the village of Berkåk in Rennebu Municipality in Trøndelag county, Norway. It is located close to the European route E06 highway.

The station is located along the Dovrebanen railway line, and it is served by four daily express trains each direction to Oslo and Trondheim as well as a few commuter trains to Trondheim. There are buses connections to the town of Orkanger by AtB.

The station was opened in 1921 as part of the Dovre Line when it was extended from Dombås to Trondheim.

Preceding station	Express trains	Following station
Oppdal towards Oslo S	F6	Støren towards Trondheim S
