= Å, Orkland =

Village in Orkland Municipality, Norway

Å Å Sentrum
- Village
- Interactive map of Å
- Location within Trøndelag Location within Norway
- Coordinates: 62.9848°N 09.7414°E
- Country: Norway
- Region: Central Norway
- County: Trøndelag
- District: Orkdalen
- Municipality: Orkland Municipality

Area
  - Total: 0.58 km^{2} (0.22 sq mi)
- Elevation: 161 m (528 ft)

Population (2003)
  - Total: 299
  - Density: 515.5/km^{2} (1,335/sq mi)
- Time zone: UTC+01:00 (CET)
  - Summer (DST): UTC+02:00 (CEST)
- Post Code: 7335 Jerpstad

Å is a village in Orkland Municipality in Trøndelag county, Norway. It lies along the Orkla River, about 2 kilometres (1.2 mi) north of the border with Rennebu Municipality.

The 0.58-square-kilometre (140-acre) village had a population (2003) of 299 and a population density of 515.5 inhabitants per square kilometre (1,335/sq mi). Since 2003, the population and area data for this village area has not been separately tracked by Statistics Norway.

Å, has the postal address 7335 Jerpstad, to distinguish it from other places named Å. Agriculture is one of the village's most important industries. A person named Jo Aa, who died in the 1990s, lived in the village of Å, and he had the shortest name in Norway.

== Name ==
The village (originally a farm) is first mentioned around 1435 "af Aam" (dative plural). The name is from the Old Norse Ár, the plural of á, meaning "(small) river". The name refers to the fact that the farm is lying between two rivers: the Orkla River and Reisa River. Until 1917, Å was spelled Aa.
