= Berkåk Church =

Church in Trøndelag, Norway

- Berkåk kirke
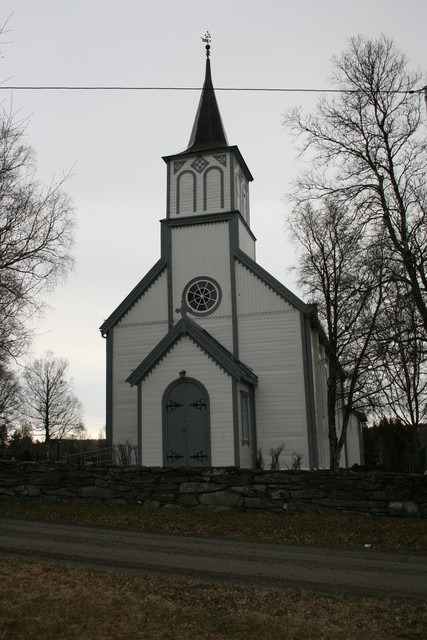
- View of the church
- Berkåk Church
- 62.83021482°N 10.00272185°E
- Location: Rennebu Municipality, Trøndelag
- Country: Norway
- Denomination: Church of Norway
- Churchmanship: Evangelical Lutheran

History
- Status: Parish church
- Founded: 1878
- Consecrated: 30 Oct 1878

Architecture
- Functional status: Active
- Architect: Henrik Nissen
- Architectural type: Long church
- Style: Neo-Gothic
- Completed: 1878 (148 years ago)

Specifications
- Capacity: 200
- Materials: Wood

Administration
- Diocese: Nidaros bispedømme
- Deanery: Gauldal prosti
- Parish: Berkåk
- Norwegian Cultural Heritage Site
- Type: Church
- Status: Listed
- ID: 83880

Berkåk Church (Norwegian: Berkåk kirke) is a parish church of the Church of Norway in Rennebu Municipality in Trøndelag county, Norway. It is located in the village of Berkåk, just west of the European route E06 highway. It is the church for the Berkåk parish which is part of the Gauldal prosti (deanery) in the Diocese of Nidaros. The white, wooden, neo-Gothic church was built in a long church style in 1878 using plans drawn up by the architect Henrik Nissen. The church seats about 200 people.

== History ==
Rennebu Municipality became its own prestegjeld in 1862. In 1877, the parish received permission to build a chapel in Berkåk, the municipal centre. The parish hired Henrik Nissen to design the church which was built in 1878. It was consecrated on 30 October 1878. In 1953, the church was renovated in advance of its 75th anniversary. John Egil Tverdahl made the designs for the renovation. On the church hill east of the parking lot, a combined mortuary and service building was built in 1971 to support the cemetery by the church. The new building was designed by Roar Tønseth. The church building was restored again in 1978 for the centennial anniversary of the building.

== Media gallery ==
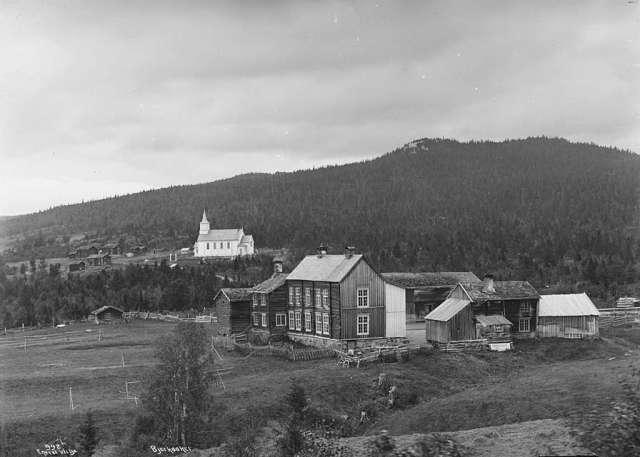
Historic photo of the church from a distance (c. 1895)

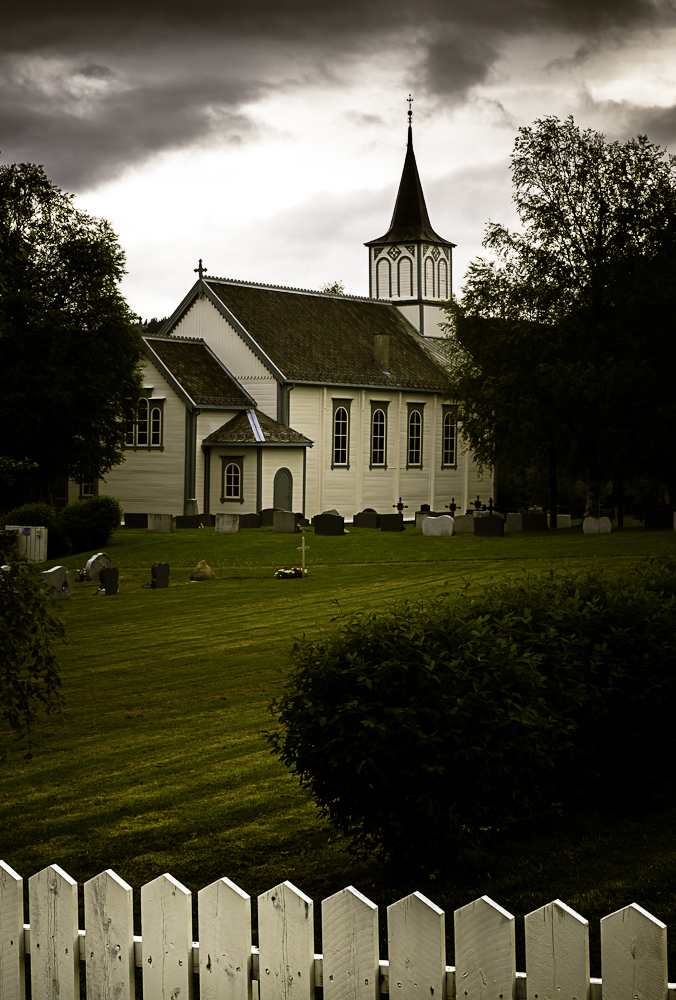
Side exterior view

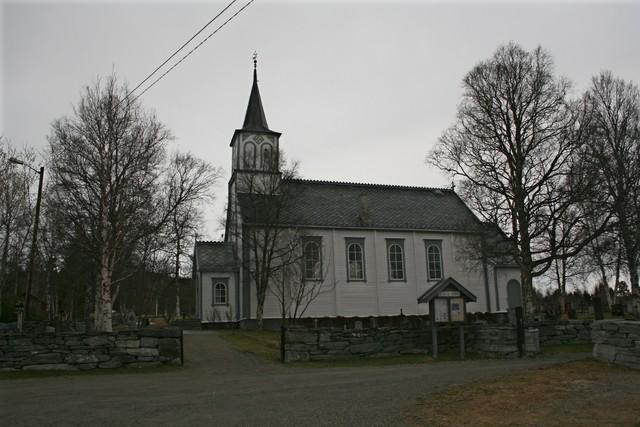
Alternate exterior view

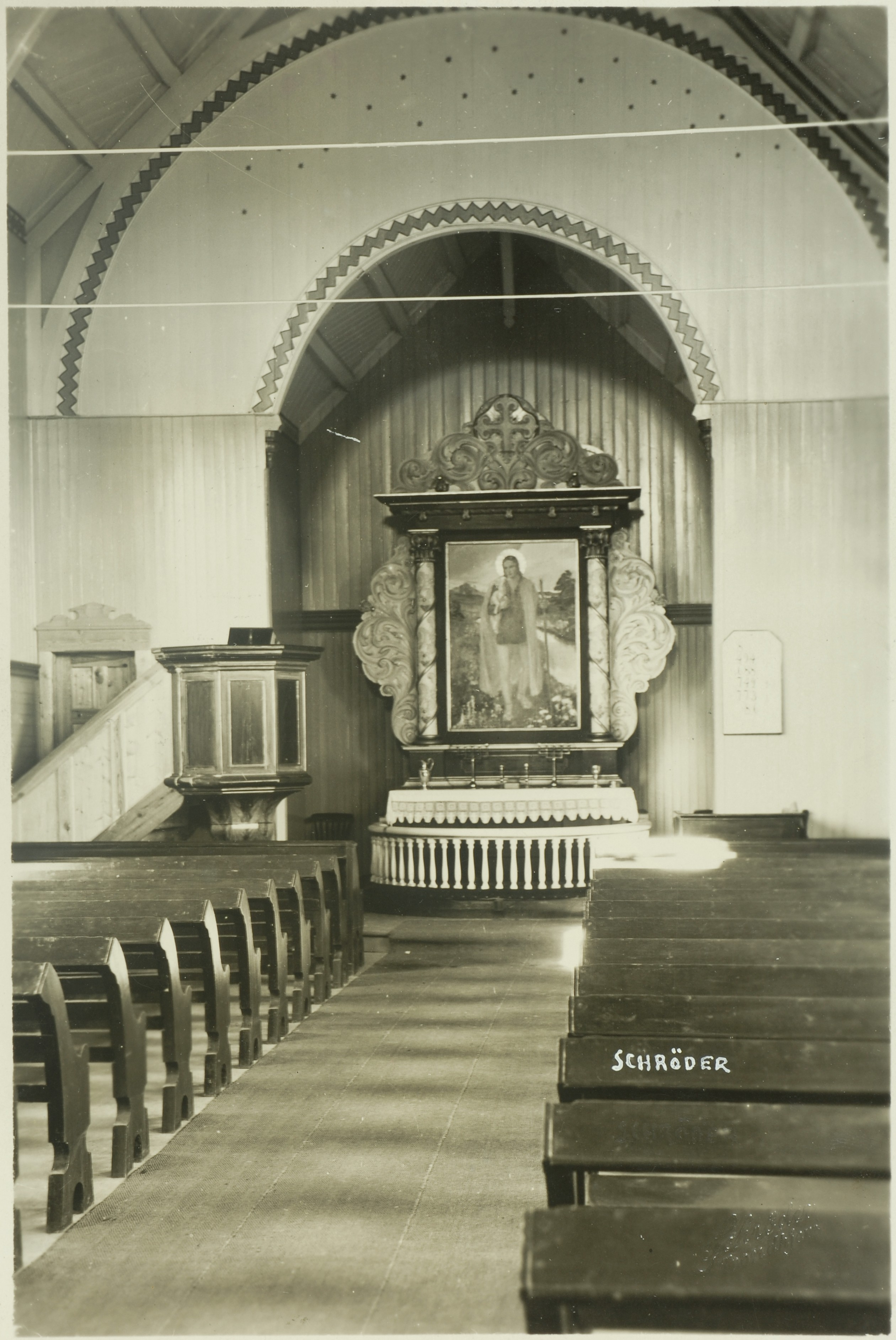
Interior view of the church

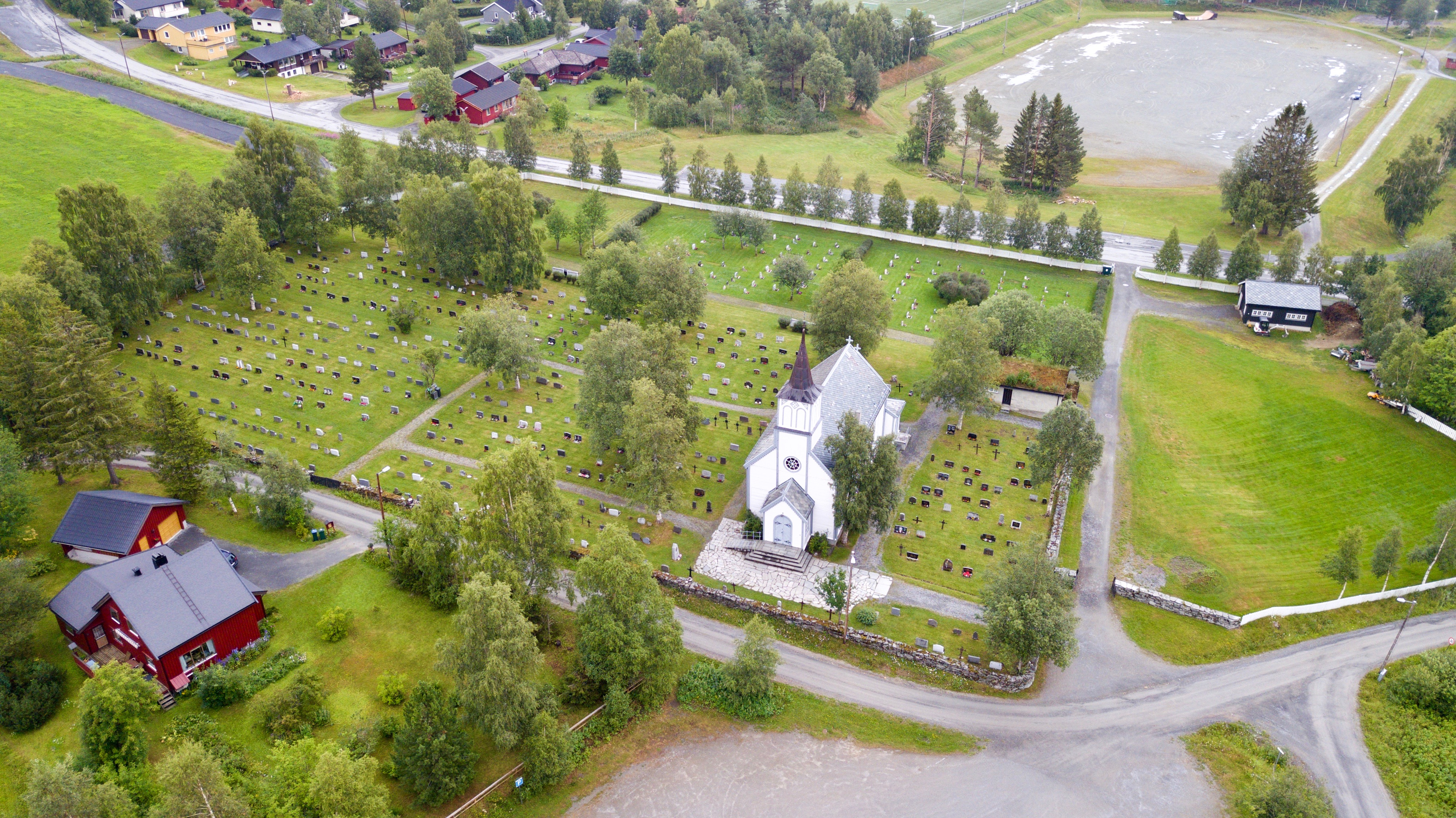
Aerial view of the church

== See also ==
- List of churches in Nidaros
