= Rennebu Church =

Church in Trøndelag, Norway

- Rennebu kirke
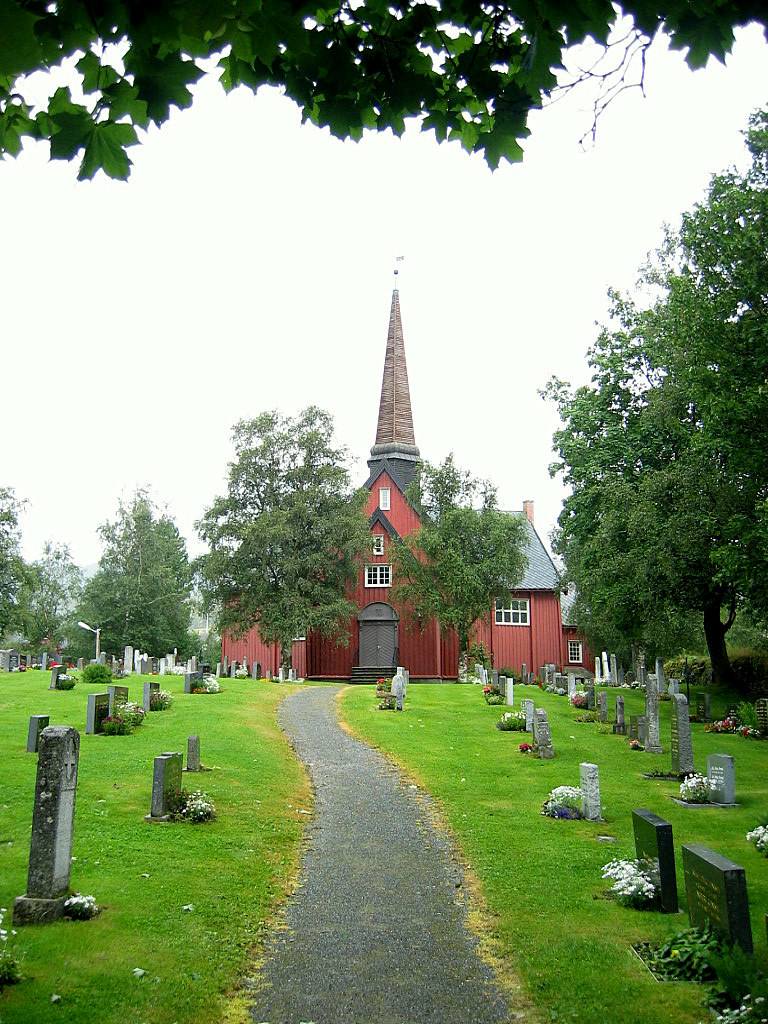
- View of the church
- Rennebu Church
- 62.87605112°N 9.83372926°E
- Location: Rennebu Municipality, Trøndelag
- Country: Norway
- Denomination: Church of Norway
- Churchmanship: Evangelical Lutheran

History
- Status: Parish church
- Founded: 12th century
- Consecrated: 1669

Architecture
- Functional status: Active
- Architect(s): Titus Bülche and Ole Jonsen Hindrum
- Architectural type: Y-shaped church
- Completed: 1669 (357 years ago)

Specifications
- Capacity: 292
- Materials: Wood

Administration
- Diocese: Nidaros bispedømme
- Deanery: Gauldal prosti
- Parish: Rennebu
- Norwegian Cultural Heritage Site
- Type: Church
- Status: Automatically protected
- ID: 85288

Rennebu Church (Norwegian: Rennebu kirke) is a parish church of the Church of Norway in Rennebu Municipality in Trøndelag county, Norway. It is located in the village of Voll, along the river Orkla. It is the main church for the Rennebu parish which is part of the Gauldal prosti (deanery) in the Diocese of Nidaros. The red, wooden church was built in a Y-shaped design in 1669 using plans drawn up by the architects Titus Bülche and Ole Jonsen Hindrum. It is the oldest of the four existing Y-shaped churches in Norway. The church seats about 292 people.

== History ==
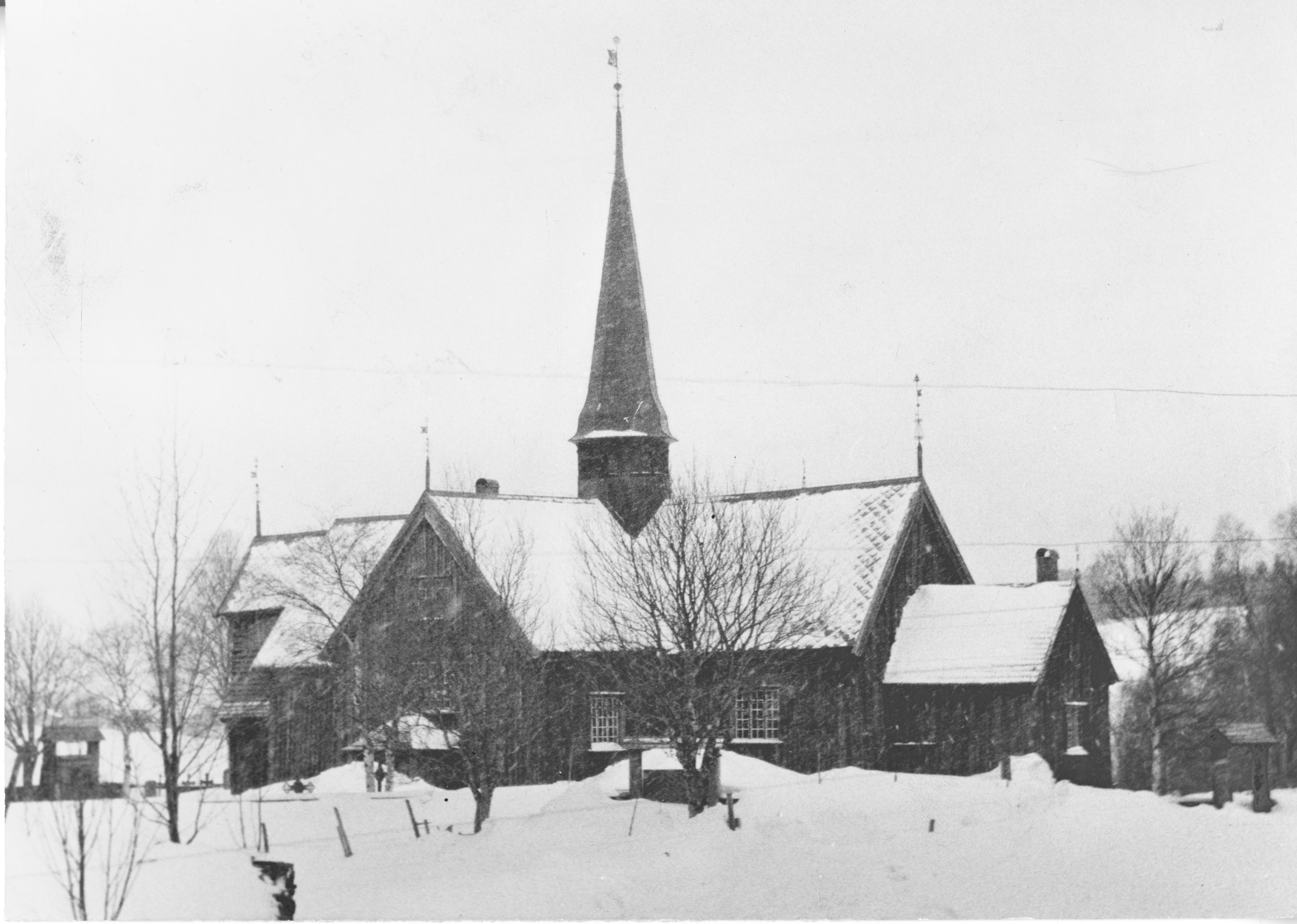
Historic view of the church

The earliest existing historical records of the church date back to the year 1297, but the church was not new that year. The first church in Rennebu was a stave church that was likely built during the 12th century. The first church was located at Voll, about 150 metres (490 ft) to the northeast of the present church site. A preserved portal from the old stave church that is now in a museum is dated to approximately 1120-1150, meaning the church was likely constructed around that time.

From 1668-1669, a new Y-shaped wooden church was constructed about 150 metres (490 ft) southwest of the old church. After the new church was completed, the old stave church was torn down. Some of the interior furniture from the old stave church was reused in the new church. The church was originally only tarred on the outside, but later, the walls were paneled and painted red. The rare Y-shape of the building has three arms. The eastern arm contains the choir and sacristy. The other two arms were the nave. The southwestern arm had an entry porch attached and this was the main entrance to the church. In the 1870s, an entry porch was added to the northwestern arm as well. During the renovation of 1873–1881, the paneling on the outer walls was replaced, and the church exterior was painted white. In addition, the interior walls were clad with paneling, and a neo-Gothic cross partition, new benches, and pointed arched windows were installed. The church was restored in 1948-1952 under the leadership of John Tverdahl. During this restoration, it was brought back to its original design including the exterior red color. Inside the church, the wall paneling and the neo-Gothic cross partition were removed, the pulpit with ceiling was restored, the windows were changed and the church was given new pews.

== See also ==
- List of churches in Nidaros
- 1669 in Norway
