= Voll, Trøndelag =

Village in Rennebu Municipality, Norway

Voll Rennebu
- Village
- Interactive map of Voll
- Location within Trøndelag Location within Norway
- Coordinates: 62.8771°N 09.8396°E
- Country: Norway
- Region: Central Norway
- County: Trøndelag
- District: Orkdalen
- Municipality: Rennebu Municipality
- Elevation: 223 m (732 ft)
- Time zone: UTC+01:00 (CET)
  - Summer (DST): UTC+02:00 (CEST)
- Post Code: 7393 Rennebu

Voll (historically: Rennebu) is a village in Rennebu Municipality in Trøndelag county, Norway. The village is located in the Orkladalen valley, along the Orkla River, about 5 kilometres (3.1 mi) north of the village of Stamnan and about 16 kilometres (9.9 mi) northeast of the mountain village of Nerskogen. Rennebu Church is located in the village.
