= Geitastrand Church =

Church in Trøndelag, Norway

- Geitastrand kirke
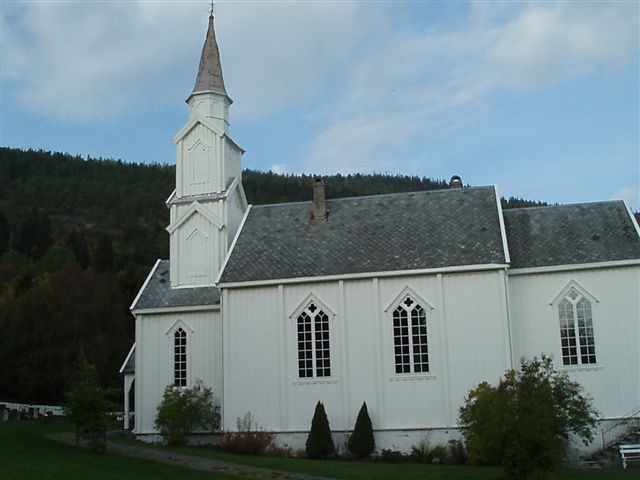
- View of the church
- Geitastrand Church
- 63°21′54″N 9°55′32″E
- Location: Orkland Municipality, Trøndelag
- Country: Norway
- Denomination: Church of Norway
- Churchmanship: Evangelical Lutheran

History
- Status: Parish church
- Founded: 1859
- Consecrated: 3 Nov 1859

Architecture
- Functional status: Active
- Architect: Christian Heinrich Grosch
- Architectural type: Long church
- Style: Swiss chalet style
- Completed: 1859 (167 years ago)

Specifications
- Capacity: 250
- Materials: Wood

Administration
- Diocese: Nidaros bispedømme
- Deanery: Orkdal prosti
- Parish: Geitastrand
- Norwegian Cultural Heritage Site
- Type: Church
- Status: Listed
- ID: 84238

Geitastrand Church (Norwegian: Geitastrand kirke) is a parish church of the Church of Norway in Orkland Municipality in Trøndelag county, Norway. It is located in the village of Geitastrand, on the shore of the Trondheimsfjorden, about 11 kilometres (6.8 mi) north of the town of Orkanger. It is the church for the Geitastrand parish which is part of the Orkdal prosti (deanery) in the Diocese of Nidaros. The white, wooden church was built in a long church style in 1859 using plans drawn up by the architect Christian Heinrich Grosch. The church seats about 250 people.

== History ==
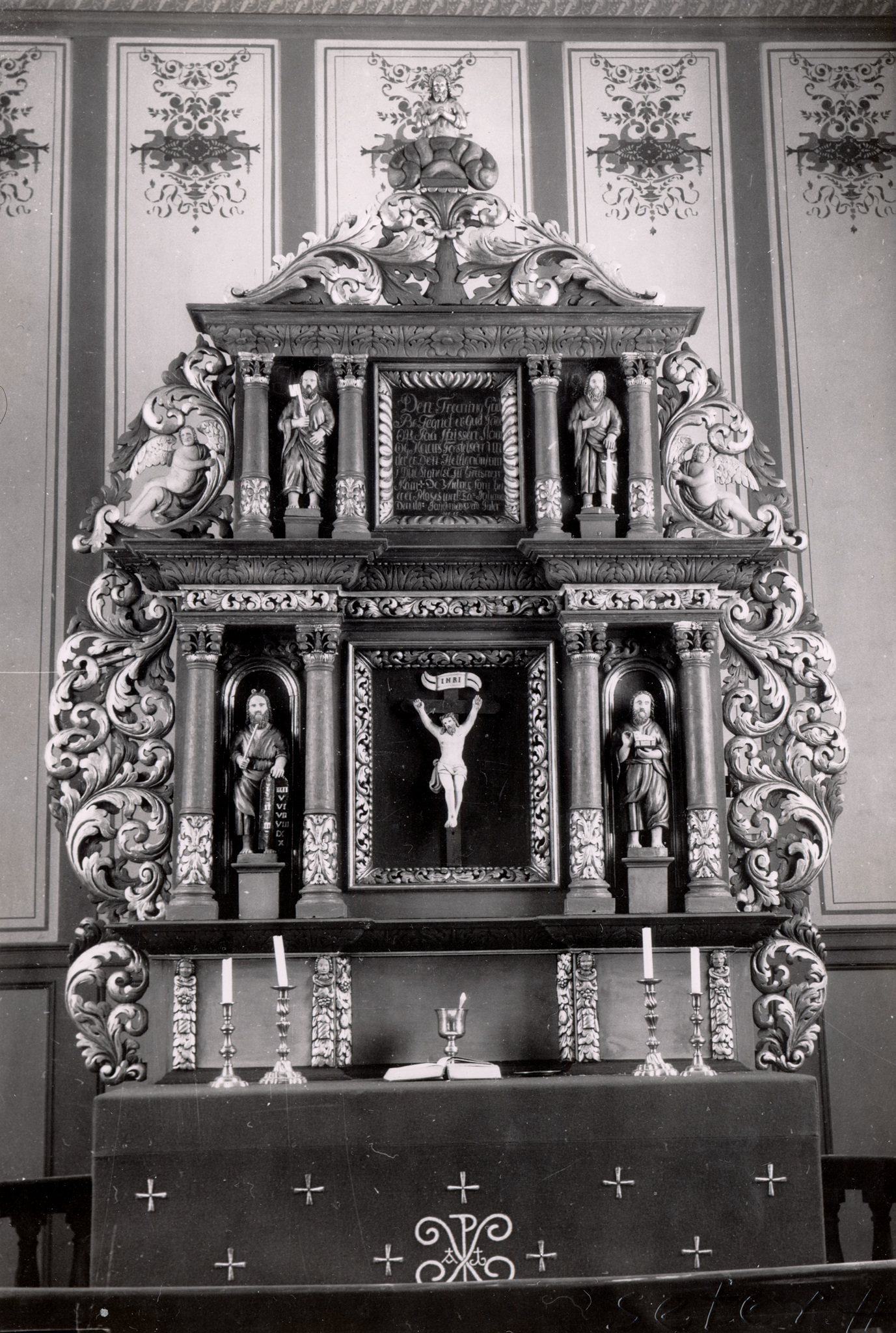
View of the altarpiece.

Historically, the Geitastrand area was part of the Viggen Church parish which was based on the opposite side of the Orkdalsfjorden. In 1857, the old Viggen Church was torn down and two new churches were built. A new Børsa Church was built on the east side of the fjord, a few kilometers east of the old Viggen Church site and a new church was built in Geitastrand, on the west side of the fjord. Christian Heinrich Grosch designed both churches. Geitastrand Church is very similar to the new Børsa Church, but it is smaller and a little simpler of a design. It is a long church in a Swiss chalet style. The church was consecrated on 3 November 1859 by the local dean, Henning Junghaus Kaurin. From 1950 to 1951, the church interior was extensively restored and updated.

== See also ==
- List of churches in Nidaros
