= Moe Church =

Church in Trøndelag, Norway

- Moe kirke
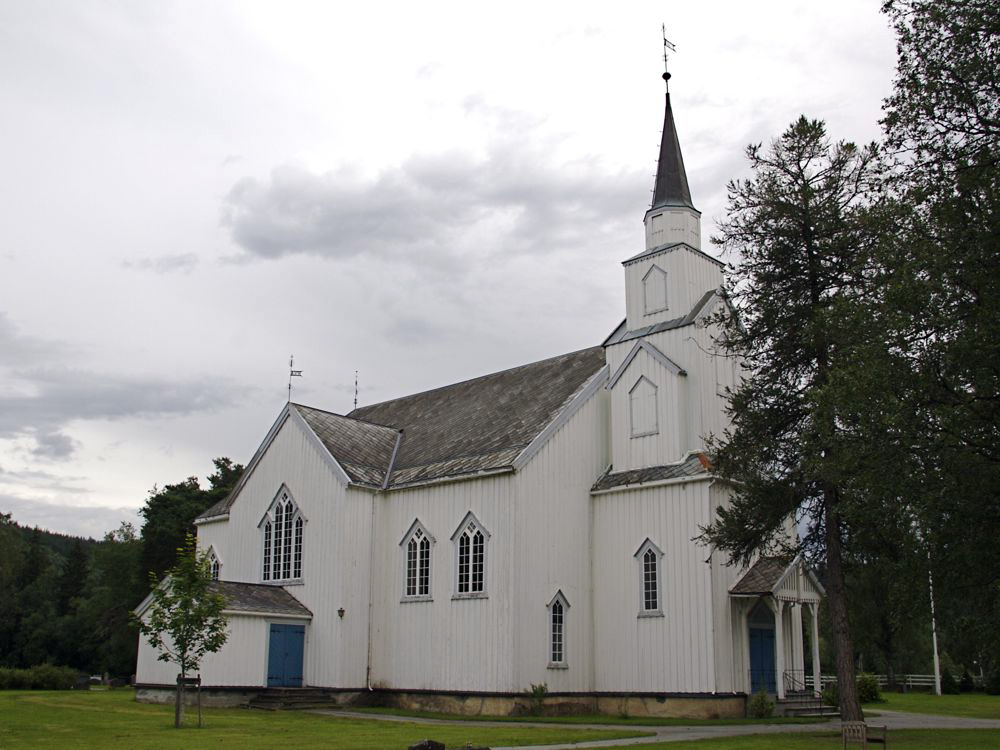
- View of the church
- Moe Church
- 63°11′16″N 9°45′57″E
- Location: Orkland Municipality, Trøndelag
- Country: Norway
- Denomination: Church of Norway
- Churchmanship: Evangelical Lutheran

History
- Former name: Orkland kirke
- Status: Parish church
- Founded: 1675
- Consecrated: 28 Dec 1867

Architecture
- Functional status: Active
- Architect: Ole F. Rømmesmo
- Architectural type: Cruciform
- Completed: 1867 (159 years ago)

Specifications
- Capacity: 310
- Materials: Wood

Administration
- Diocese: Nidaros bispedømme
- Deanery: Orkdal prosti
- Parish: Orkland
- Norwegian Cultural Heritage Site
- Type: Church
- Status: Not protected
- ID: 85236

Moe Church (Norwegian: Moe kirke) is a parish church of the Church of Norway in Orkland Municipality in Trøndelag county, Norway. It is located in the village of Vormstad, about 15 kilometres (9.3 mi) south of the town of Orkanger. It is the church for the Orkland parish which is part of the Orkdal prosti (deanery) in the Diocese of Nidaros. The white, wooden church was built in a cruciform style in 1867 by the builder Ole Fredriksen Rømmesmo. The church seats about 310 people.

== History ==
The original chapel in Orkland was built in 1675 in the nearby village of Svorkmo where many people worked at a smelting factory. It was a cruciform building with tower on the roof with a church porch on the west end. On 3 June 1816, there was a river flood which swept through the area along the river where the cemetery and church were located. The church was heavily damaged and not much of the interior furniture was able to be saved. The church was torn down and its materials were used for flood protection in Svorkmo. A new church was constructed on the nearby Smedshaugen farm about 800 metres (2,600 ft) northeast of the old church site (on higher ground, further away from the river). The new church was a small, octagonal church. Eventually, the smelter in Svorkmo was closed down and the church was too small for the parish, so despite its young age, the church was closed and torn down in 1866.

Soon after, a new church was constructed at Moe on the south side of Vormstad, about 2 kilometres (1.2 mi) north of Smedshaugen. The new site was more easily accessible for the people of the parish. After some delays, the construction began in 1866 and the church was consecrated on 28 December 1867 by bishop Andreas Grimelund. The church was extensively repaired under the leadership of John Tverdahl in 1958–1959.

== Media gallery ==
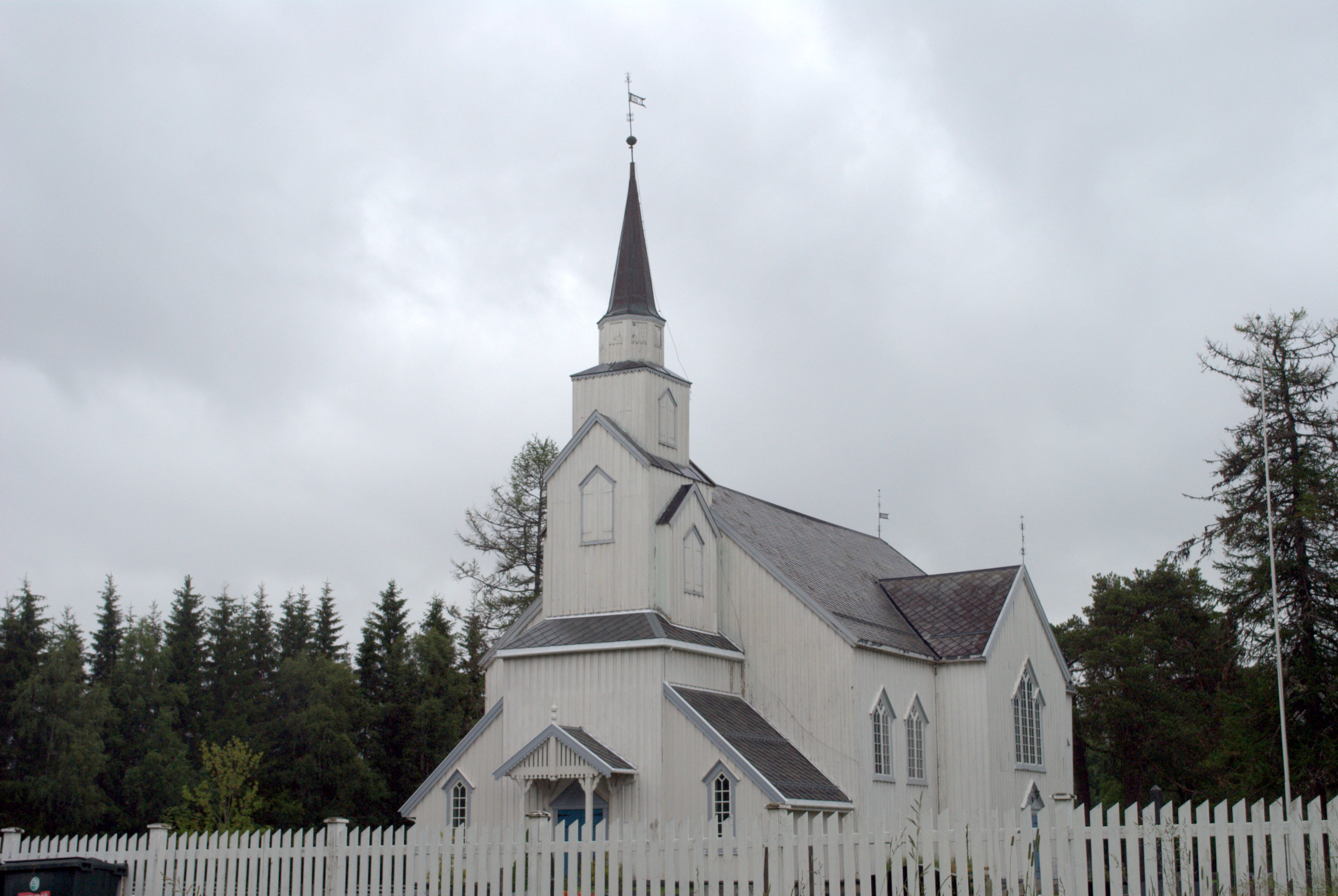
Credit: Cato Edvardsen

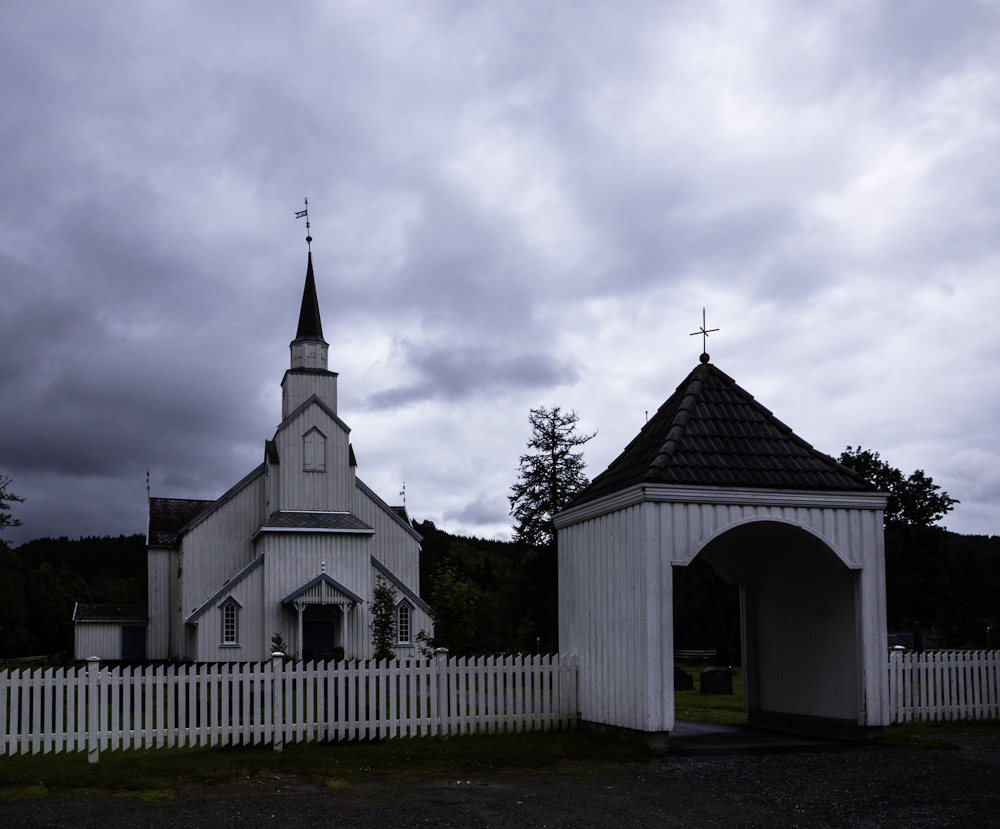
Credit: Henny Stokseth

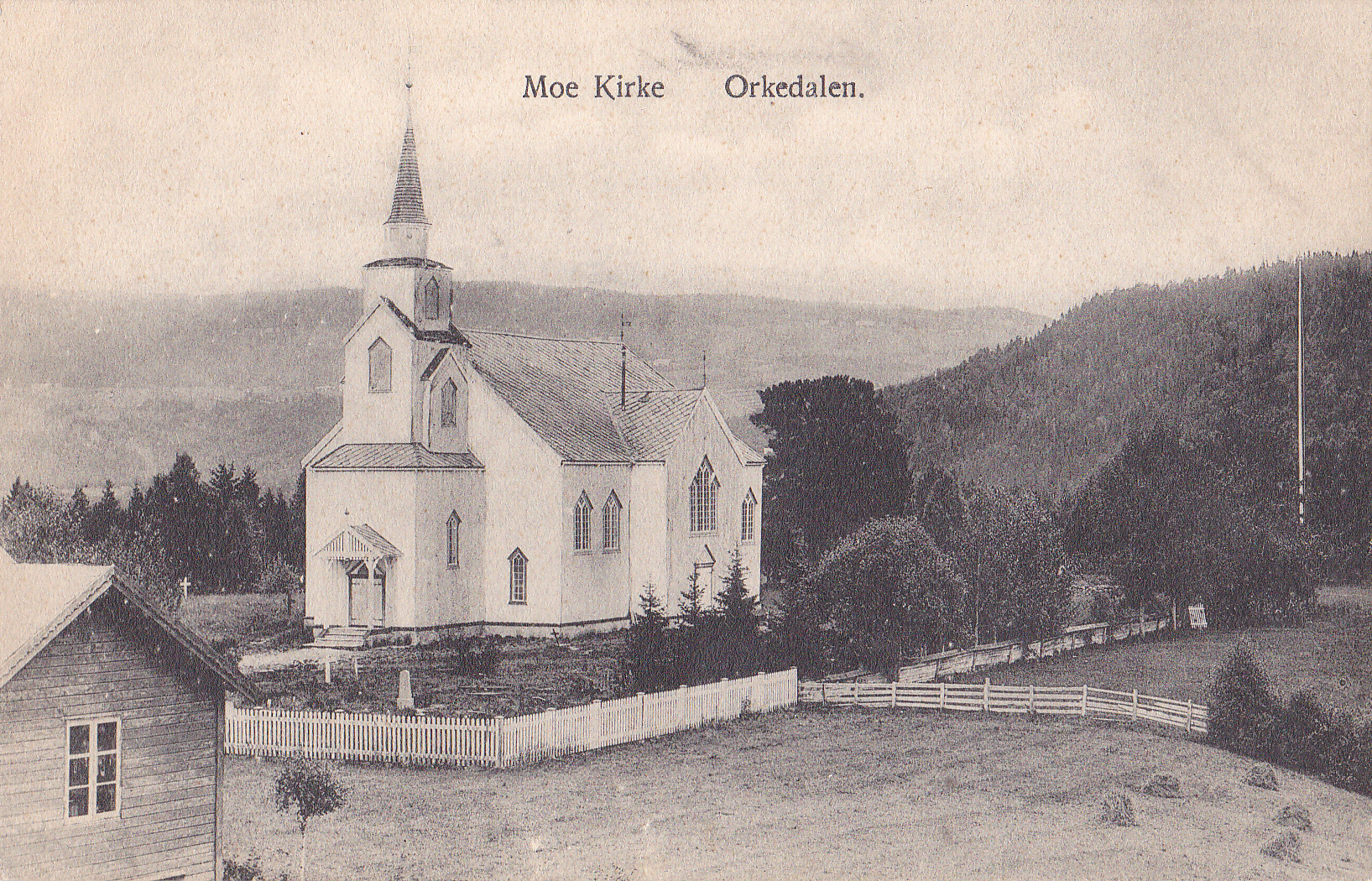
postcard c1910

== See also ==
- List of churches in Nidaros
