= Nerskogen Chapel =

Church in Trøndelag, Norway

- Nerskogen kapell
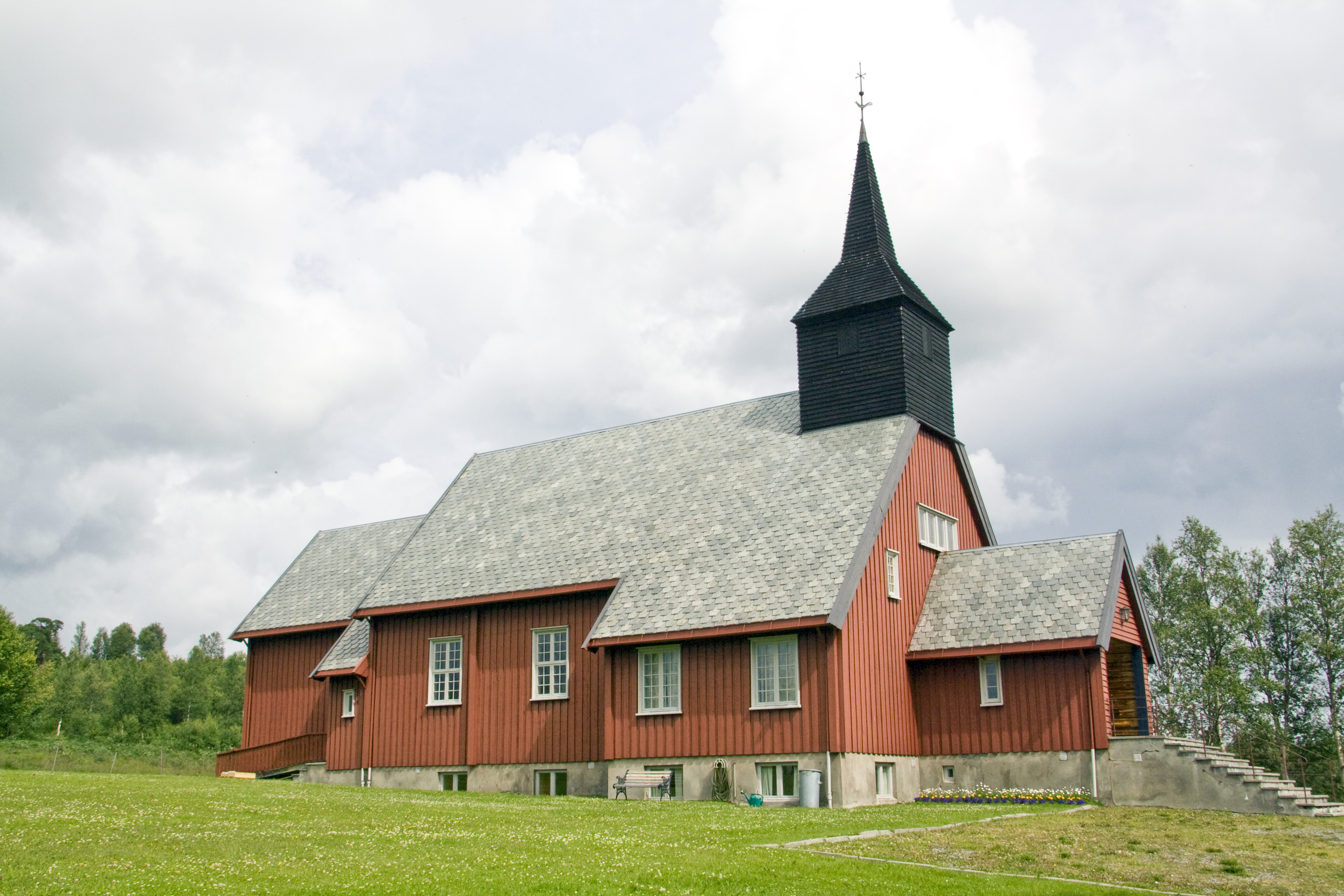
- View of the church
- Nerskogen Chapel
- 62.78814071°N 09.62247848°E
- Location: Rennebu Municipality, Trøndelag
- Country: Norway
- Denomination: Church of Norway
- Churchmanship: Evangelical Lutheran

History
- Status: Parish church
- Founded: 1962
- Consecrated: 2 Sept 1962

Architecture
- Functional status: Active
- Architect: John Egil Tverdahl
- Architectural type: Long church
- Completed: 1962 (64 years ago)

Specifications
- Capacity: 110
- Materials: Wood

Administration
- Diocese: Nidaros bispedømme
- Deanery: Gauldal prosti
- Parish: Rennebu
- Norwegian Cultural Heritage Site
- Type: Church
- Status: Not protected
- ID: 85102

Nerskogen Chapel (Norwegian: Nerskogen kapell) is a parish church of the Church of Norway in Rennebu Municipality in Trøndelag county, Norway. It is located in the rural mountain village of Nerskogen. It is one of the churches for the Rennebu parish which is part of the Gauldal prosti (deanery) in the Diocese of Nidaros. The red, wooden church was built in a long church style in 1962 using plans drawn up by the architect John Egil Tverdahl. The church seats about 110 people and it has about 13 services per year. It was consecrated on 2 September 1962 by Bishop Tord Godal.

== See also ==
- List of churches in Nidaros
