= Nerskogen, Trøndelag =

Village in Rennebu Municipality, Norway

Nerskogen Norskogen
- Village
- Interactive map of Nerskogen
- Location within Trøndelag Location within Norway
- Coordinates: 62.7824°N 09.6067°E
- Country: Norway
- Region: Central Norway
- County: Trøndelag
- District: Orkdalen
- Municipality: Rennebu Municipality
- Elevation: 727 m (2,385 ft)
- Time zone: UTC+01:00 (CET)
  - Summer (DST): UTC+02:00 (CEST)
- Post Code: 7393 Rennebu

Nerskogen is a mountain village in Rennebu Municipality in Trøndelag county, Norway. The village is located about 20 kilometres (12 mi) west of the village of Voll and about 19 kilometres (12 mi) north of the village in Vognillan in neighboring Oppdal Municipality. Nerskogen Chapel is located in the village.

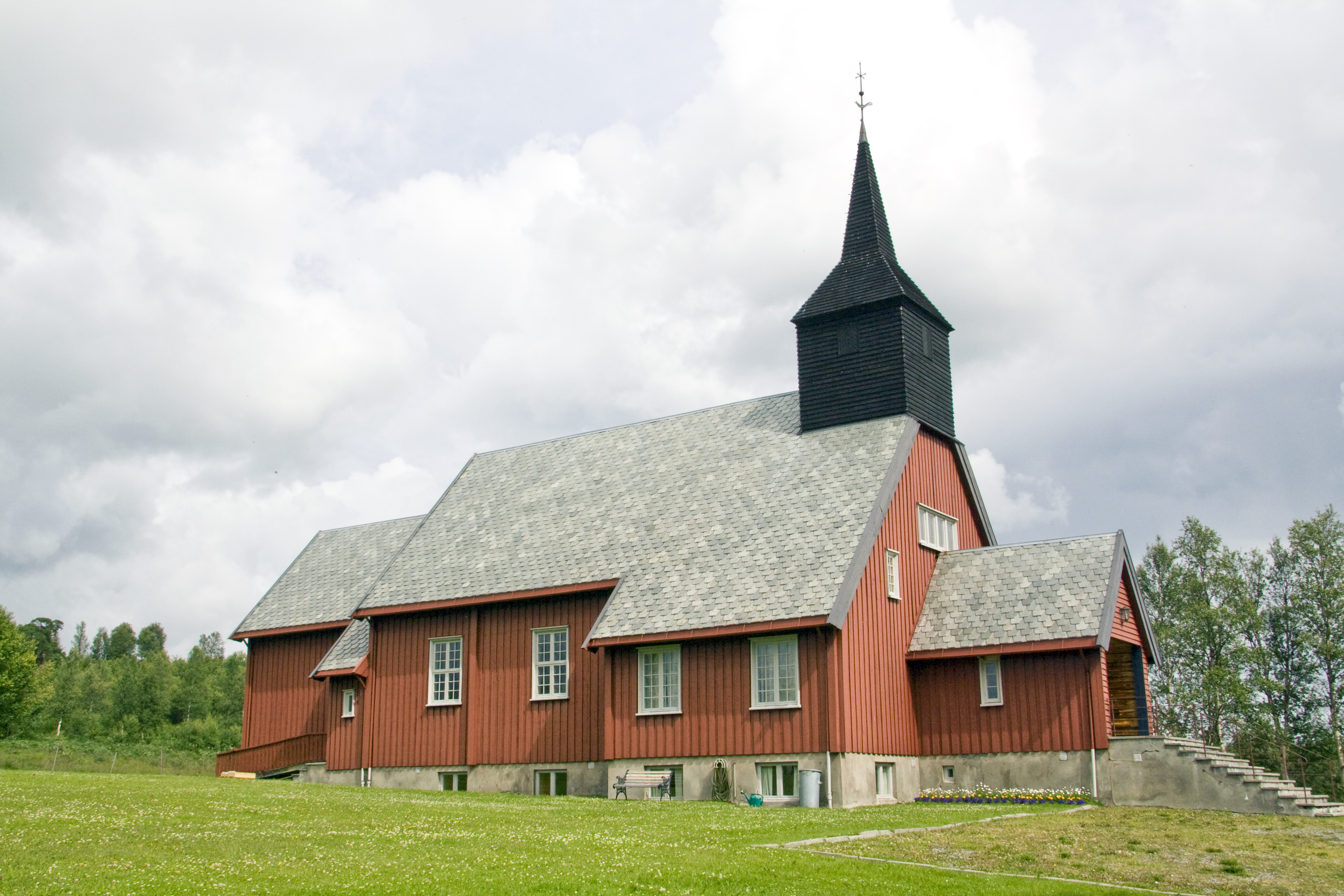
Nerskogen Chapel
