= Berkåk =

Village in Rennebu Municipality, Norway

- Village
- Interactive map of Berkåk
- Location within Trøndelag Location within Norway
- Coordinates: 62.8280°N 10.0093°E
- Country: Norway
- Region: Central Norway
- County: Trøndelag
- District: Orkdalen
- Municipality: Rennebu Municipality

Area
  - Total: 1.36 km^{2} (0.53 sq mi)
- Elevation: 426 m (1,398 ft)

Population (2024)
  - Total: 1,003
  - Density: 738/km^{2} (1,910/sq mi)
- Time zone: UTC+01:00 (CET)
  - Summer (DST): UTC+02:00 (CEST)
- Post Code: 7391 Rennebu

Berkåk is the administrative centre of Rennebu Municipality in Trøndelag county, Norway. It is located in the Orkladalen valley along the river Orkla. The village lies about 10 kilometres (6.2 mi) north of the village of Ulsberg and 8 kilometres (5.0 mi) southeast of the village of Stamnan. The European route E6 highway runs through the village, as does the Dovrebanen railway line which stops at Berkåk Station. Berkåk Church is also located in the village.

The 1.36-square-kilometre (340-acre) village has a population (2024) of 1,003 and a population density of 738 inhabitants per square kilometre (1,910/sq mi).

Along the E6 highway south of the village, is the Kunstsenteret Birka, the national centre for arts and crafts. Every August, since 1986, the village hosts the large fair called Rennebumartnan.

In the 1500s and 1600s, the village was named Birckagir, Berckager, and Berchager. More recently the spelling was Bjerkaager or Bjerkaaker.

== Notable residents ==
- Astrid S (born 1996), singer and songwriter
- Vebjørn Rodal, athlete and Olympic champion

== Media gallery ==
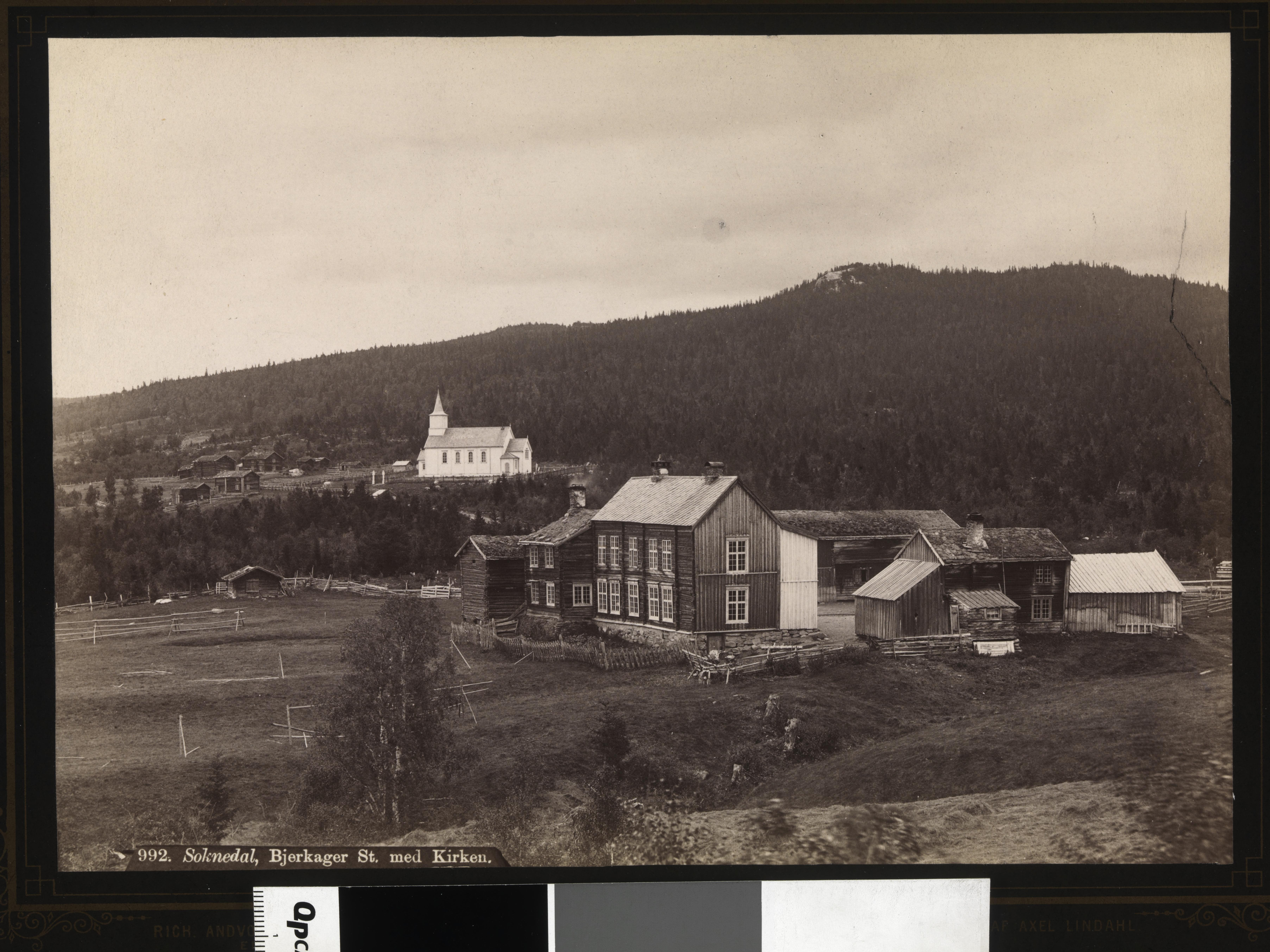
Berkåk and the local church (c. 1885)

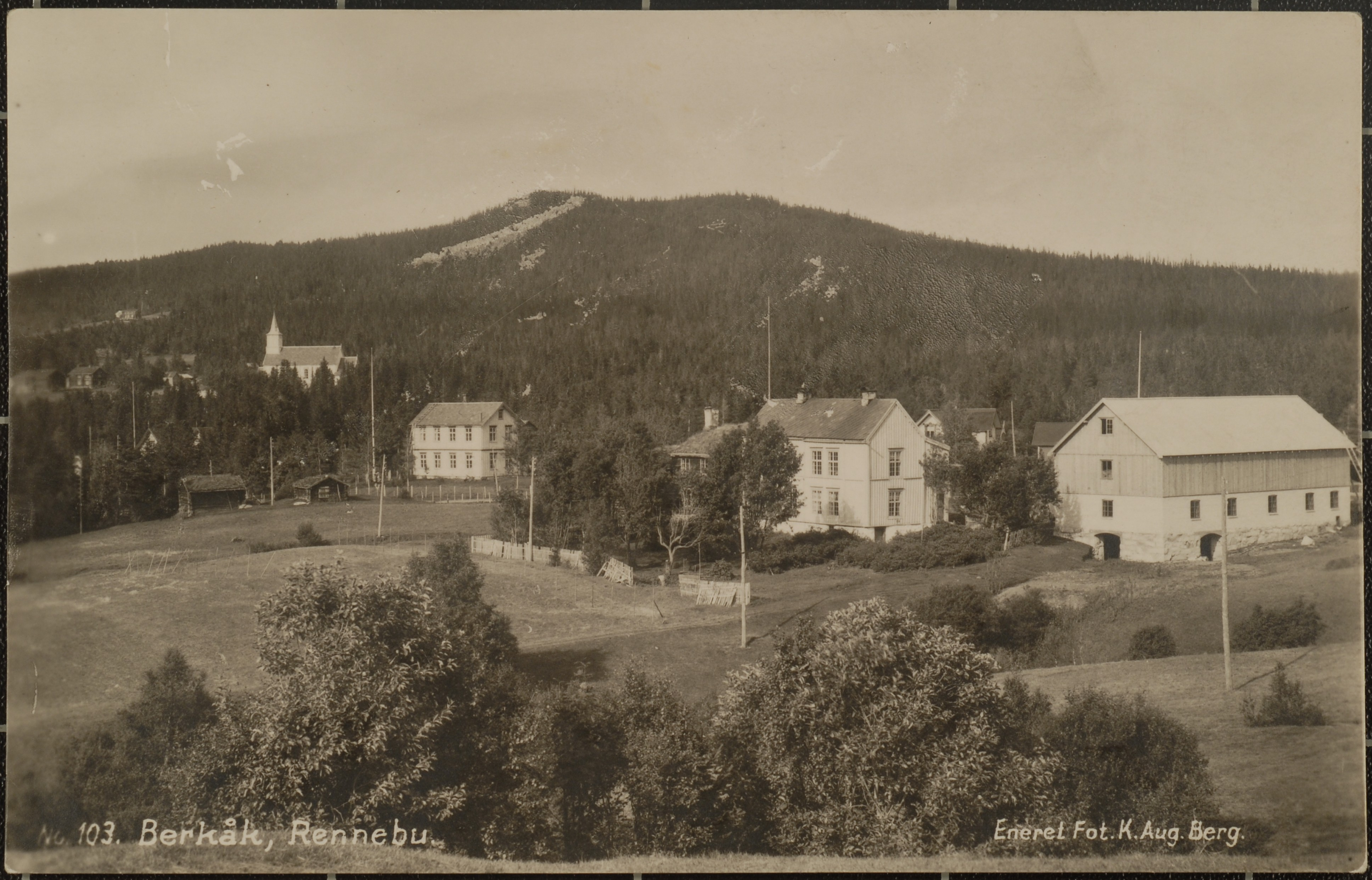
Another historic view of Berkåk

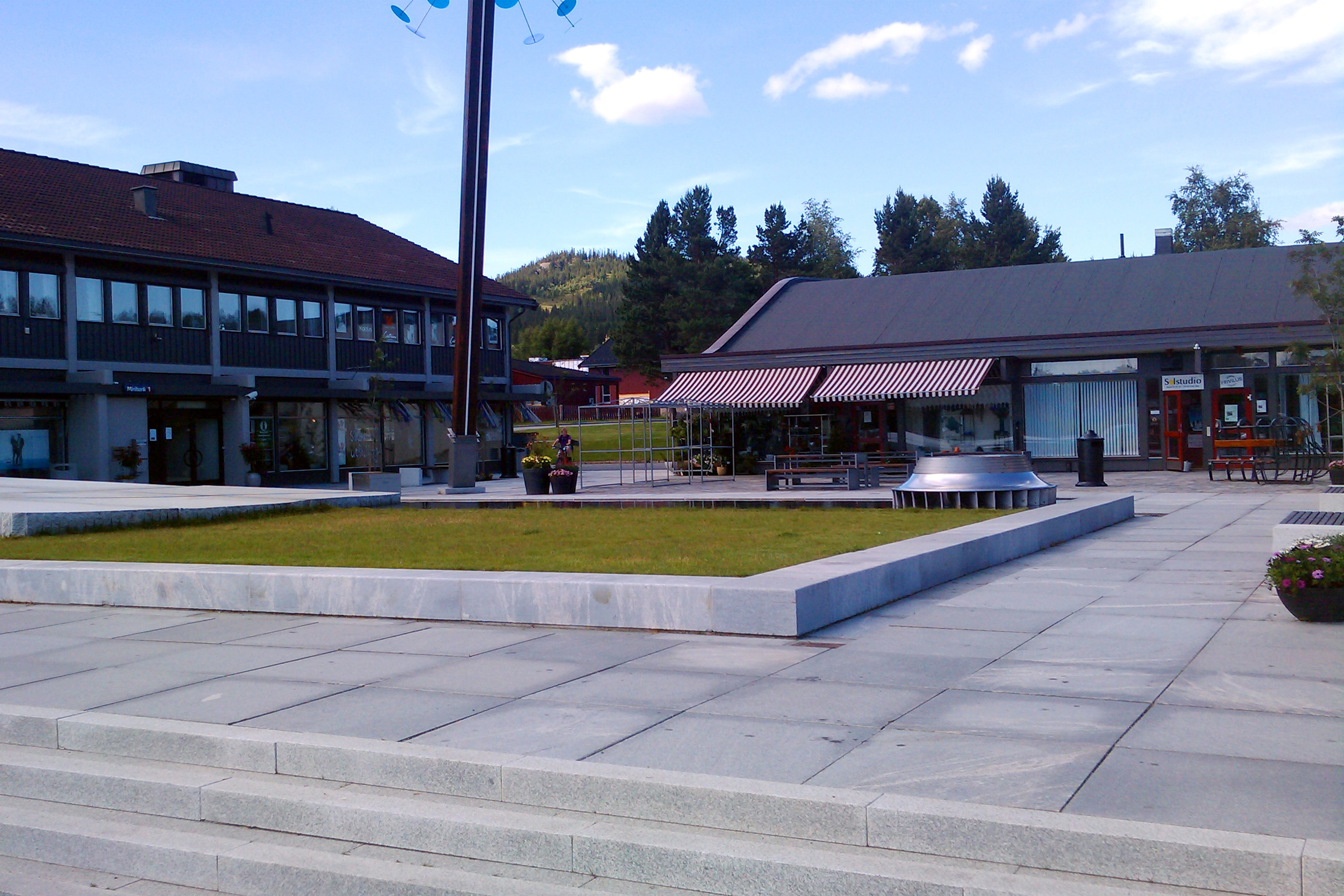
Berkåk in 2010

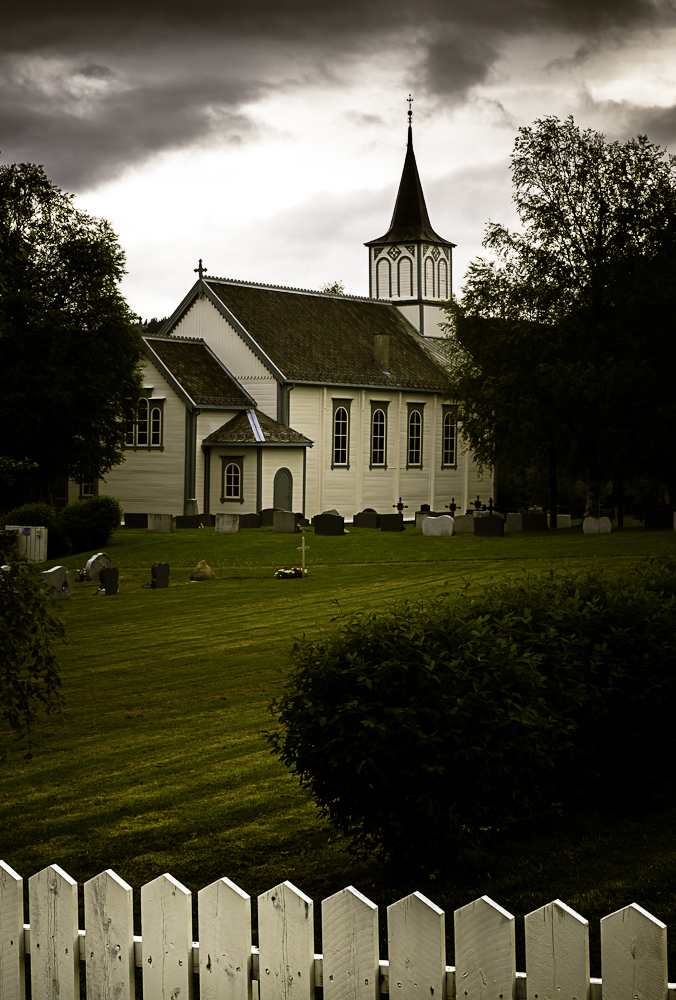
Berkåk Church
