= Orkdal Fjord =

Fjord in Trøndelag, Norway

Orkdal Fjord (English) Orkdalsfjorden (Norwegian)
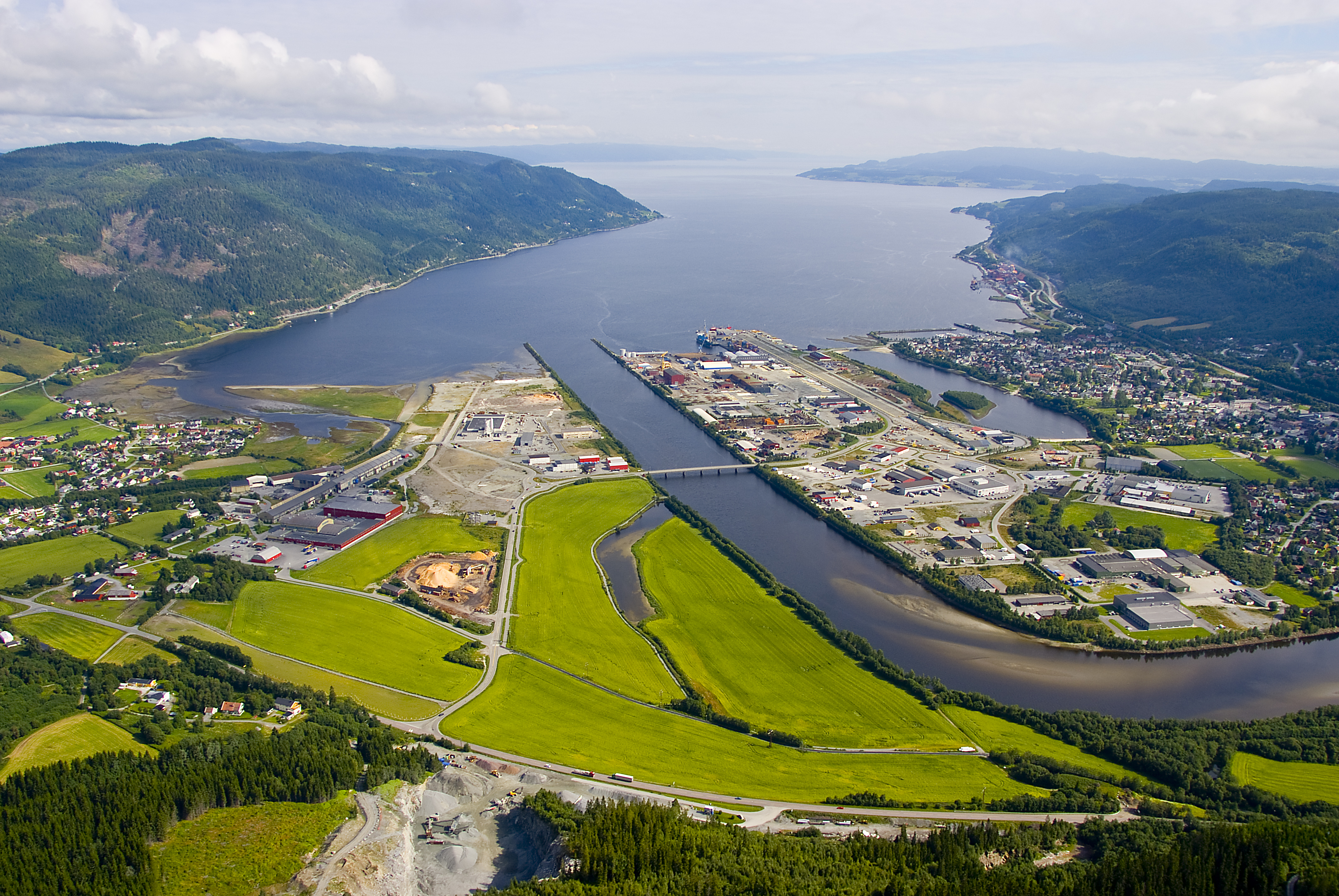
- View of the Orkdal Fjord with Orkanger and the mouth of the river Orkla in the foreground.
- Interactive map of the fjord
- Location: Trøndelag county, Norway
- Coordinates: 63.3533°N 9.934463°E
- Type: Fjord
- Basin countries: Norway
- Max. length: 11 kilometres (6.8 mi)
- Settlements: Orkanger

Orkdal Fjord (English) or Orkdalsfjorden (Norwegian) is a branch of the Trondheim Fjord located in Orkland Municipality and Skaun Municipality in Trøndelag county, Norway.

The Orkdal Fjord starts between Viggja village on the southeast side of the fjord and the village of Geitastrand on the northwest side of the fjord. This is where the Korsfjorden part of the Trondheim Fjord splits into two separate branches; Gaulosen that stretches towards the southeast and the Orkdal Fjord that stretches about 11 kilometres (6.8 mi) towards the southwest to Orkanger and the mouth of the Orkla river at the end of the fjord. For most of its length the fjord is just over 2 kilometres (1.2 mi) wide.

Much of the land on either side of the fjord is quite steep and the gradient often continues into the sea with the fjord reaching depths in excess of 350 metres (1,150 ft) just a short distance from the shore in some places. The maximum depth of the Trondheim Fjord is around 600 metres (2,000 ft).

Orkanger Harbour, which also includes Thamshamn, lies at the end of the fjord. The harbour is administered by Trondheim Harbour. The main export is ferrosilicon and the main imports are coal, coke, and quartz.

The European route E39 highway runs along the southeastern side of the fjord while county route 710 runs along the other side of the fjord.

== See also ==
- List of Norwegian fjords
