= Orkla (river) =

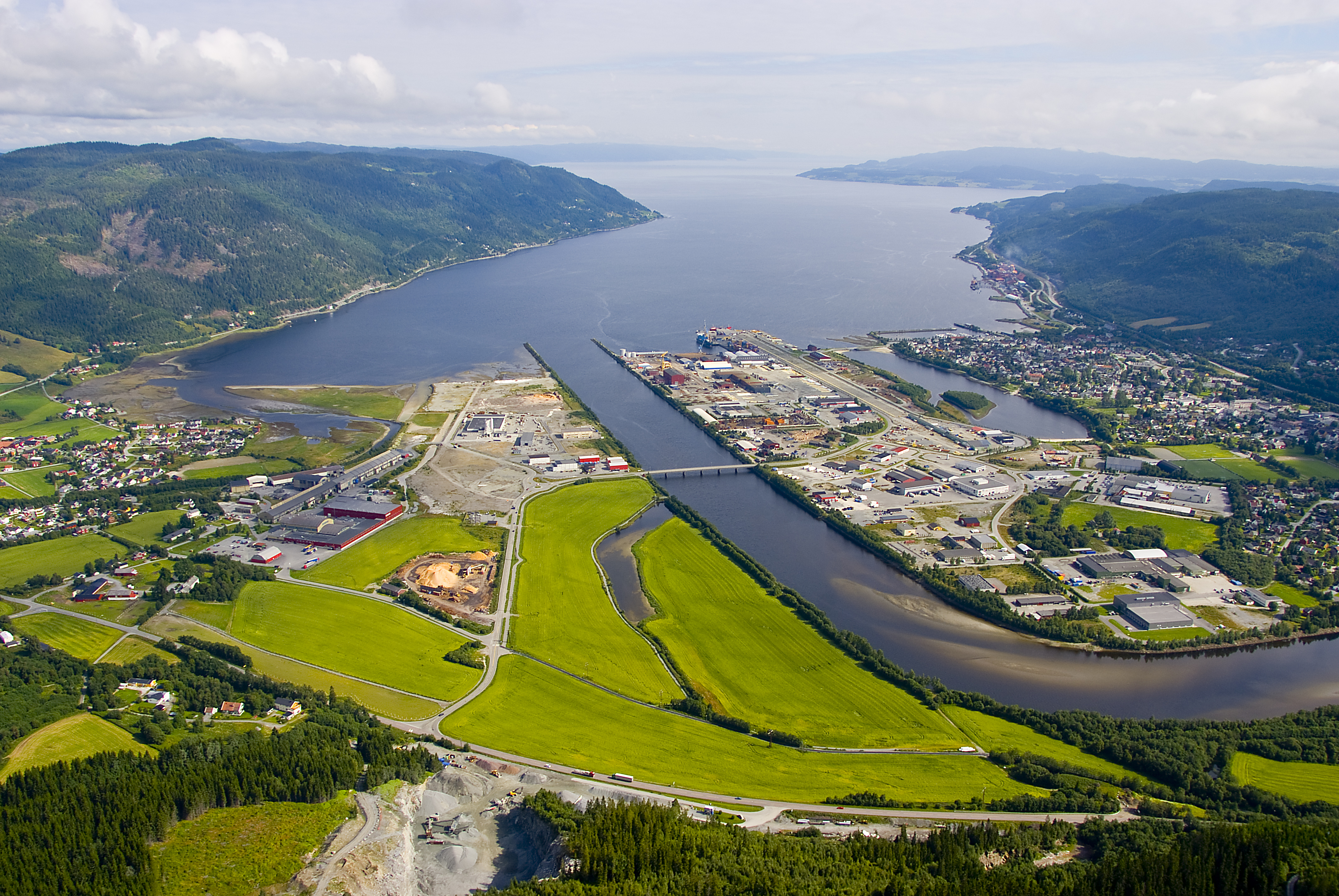
- The mouth of the river at Orkanger
- Interactive map of the river

Location
- Country: Norway
- Counties: Trøndelag, Innlandet
- Municipalities: Oppdal Municipality, Orkland Municipality, Rennebu Municipality, Tynset Municipality

Physical characteristics
- Source: Orkelsjøen
  - location: Oppdal Municipality, Trøndelag
  - coordinates: 62.5102°N 09.8775°E
  - elevation: 1,058 metres (3,471 ft)
- Mouth: Orkanger
  - location: Orkland Municipality, Trøndelag
  - coordinates: 63.31927°N 09.841218°E
  - elevation: 0 metres (0 ft)
- Length: 179 km (111 mi)
- Basin size: 3,053 km^{2} (1,179 sq mi)
- Discharge
  - average: 67.27 m^{3}/s (2,376 cu ft/s)

Basin features
- River system: Orkla
- Tributaries
  - left: Inna, Byna, Grana, and Resa
  - right: Ya and Svorka

Orkla is a river in Trøndelag and Innlandet counties in Norway. At 180 kilometres (110 mi) in length, it is the longest river in Trøndelag county. The river follows the Orkdalen valley, discharging into the Orkdal Fjord, an arm of the large Trondheimsfjorden, at the town of Orkanger.

The river originates in the lake Orkelsjøen, a small lake (2.2 km^{2} (0.85 sq mi)) near the watershed with the river Unna in the Glomma river system, in Oppdal Municipality in the Dovrefjell mountains. The river runs through Oppdal Municipality, Tynset Municipality, Rennebu Municipality, and Orkland Municipality. The municipalities are all in Trøndelag county, except for Tynset Municipality, which is in Innlandet county. Major towns and villages along the river include: Orkanger, Fannrem, Vormstad, Svorkmo, Storås, Meldal, Å (in Orkland Municipality); and Voll and Berkåk (in Rennebu Municipality).

Orkla is a popular river for salmon fishing and the fourth largest in Norway by volume. About an 88-kilometre (55 mi) long stretch of the river through Orkland Municipality and Rennebu Municipality is used for salmon fishing throughout the season which typically runs from 1 June through 31 August.

The river is regulated by five power generation reservoirs, which were built between 1978 and 1985. The reservoirs have been a successful method of flood control preventing the river's major seasonal flooding. The decommissioned Eidsfossen Power Station stands along the river south of the confluence with the Ya River at Yset.

== Name ==
The Old Norse form of the name was just Ork (still found in the names Orkanger, Orkdal, Orkland) and Orkelsjøen. The meaning of the name is unknown (maybe derived from the old Norse verb orka which means "to work" - the meaning of the name would then be "the river that works its way forward"). The name Orkla (with the diminutive ending -la) originally belonged to the uppermost part of the river (lying in Tynset Municipality, Innlandet), and the meaning of this name is probably "the small part of Ork".

== See also ==
- List of rivers in Norway
