= Rennebu Municipality =

Municipality in Trøndelag, Norway

Rennebu Municipality Rennebu kommune
- Municipality
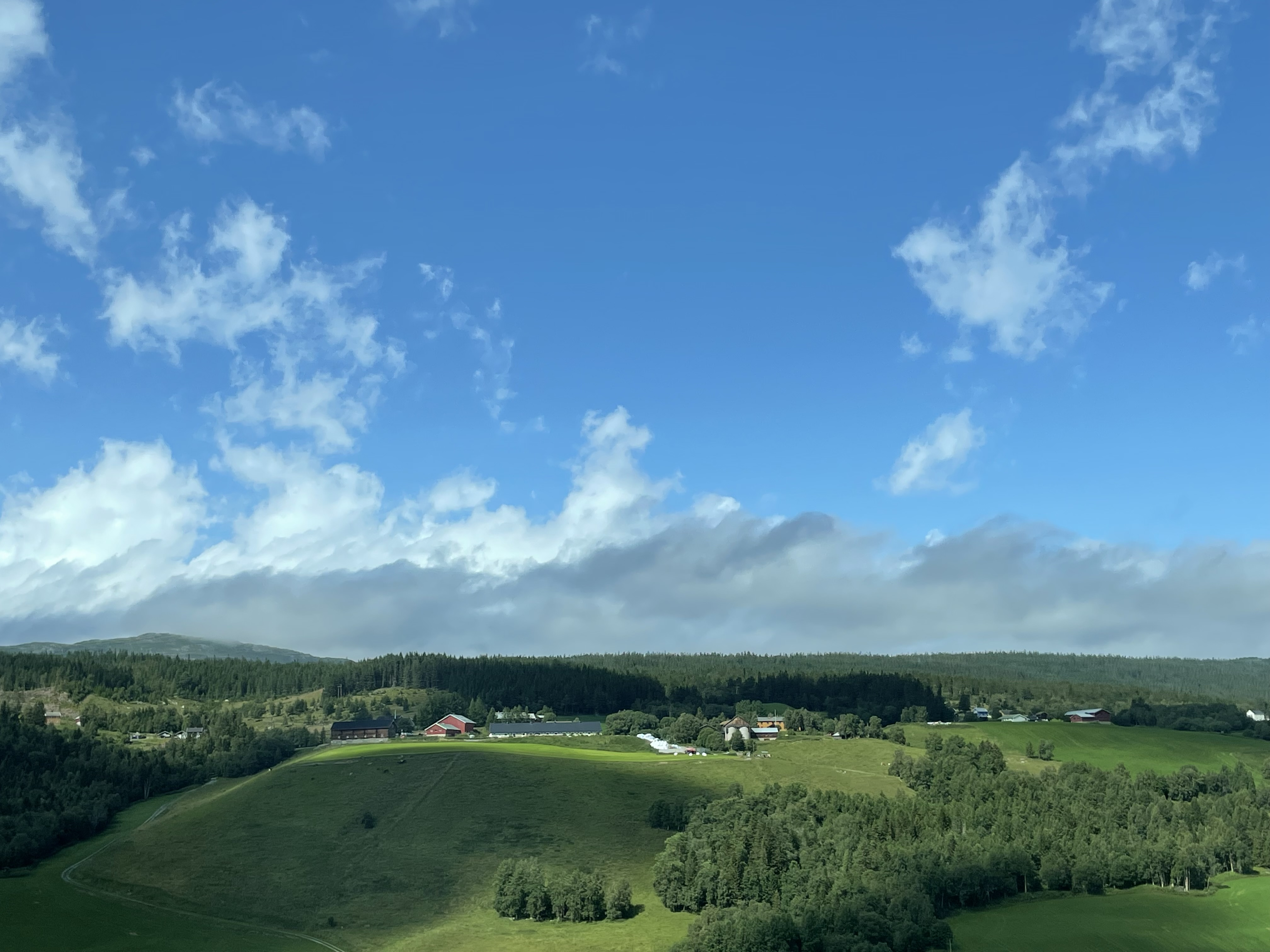

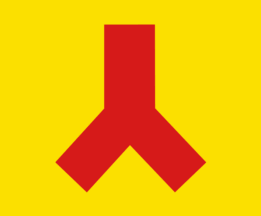
- Flag Coat of arms

- Trøndelag within Norway

- Rennebu within Trøndelag
- Coordinates: 62°49′51″N 09°52′28″E
- Country: Norway
- County: Trøndelag
- District: Orkdalen
- Established: 1839
  - Preceded by: Meldal Municipality
- Administrative centre: Berkåk

Government
  - Mayor (2023): Per Arne Lium (Sp)

Area
  - Total: 947.95 km^{2} (366.01 sq mi)
  - Land: 923.84 km^{2} (356.70 sq mi)
  - Water: 24.11 km^{2} (9.31 sq mi) 2.5%
  - Rank: #123 in Norway
- Highest elevation: 1,548.08 m (5,079.0 ft)

Population (2024)
  - Total: 2,484
  - Rank: #257 in Norway
  - Density: 2.6/km^{2} (6.7/sq mi)
  - Change (10 years): ▼ −2.8%
- Demonym: Rennbygg

Official language
  - Norwegian form: Neutral
- Time zone: UTC+01:00 (CET)
  - Summer (DST): UTC+02:00 (CEST)
- ISO 3166 code: NO-5022
- Website: Official website

Rennebu is a municipality in Trøndelag county, Norway. It is part of the Orkdalen region. The administrative centre of the municipality is the village of Berkåk, located along European route E6. The majority of the population lives in the villages of Berkåk, Innset, Stamnan, Ulsberg, Voll, and Nerskogen.

The 948-square-kilometre (366 sq mi) municipality is the 123rd largest by area out of the 357 municipalities in Norway. Rennebu Municipality is the 257th most populous municipality in Norway with a population of 2,484. The municipality's population density is 2.6 inhabitants per square kilometre (6.7/sq mi) and its population has decreased by 2.8% over the previous 10-year period.

== General information ==
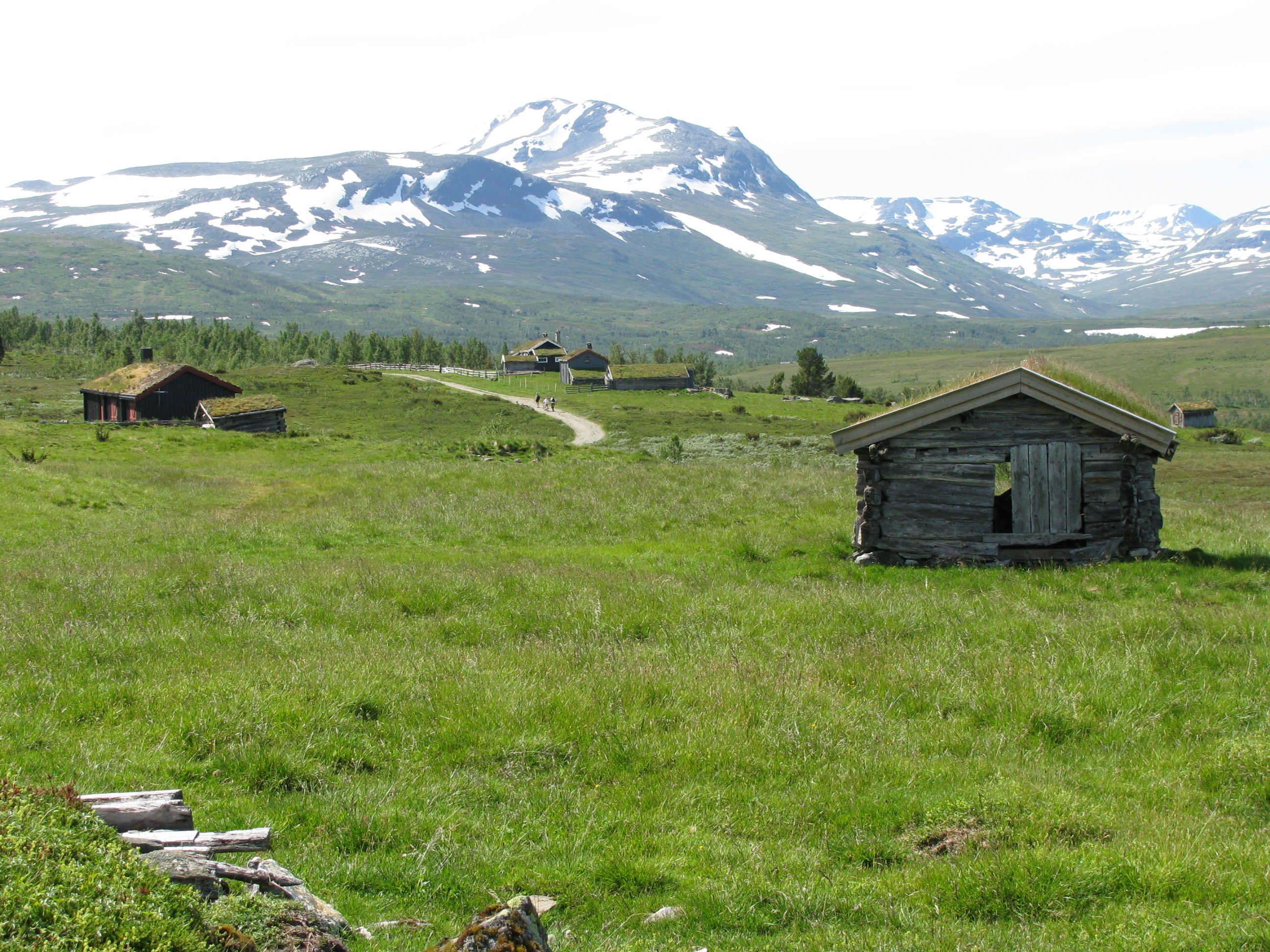
Farms in the northeasternmost part of Trollheimen mountain range in Rennebu Municipality

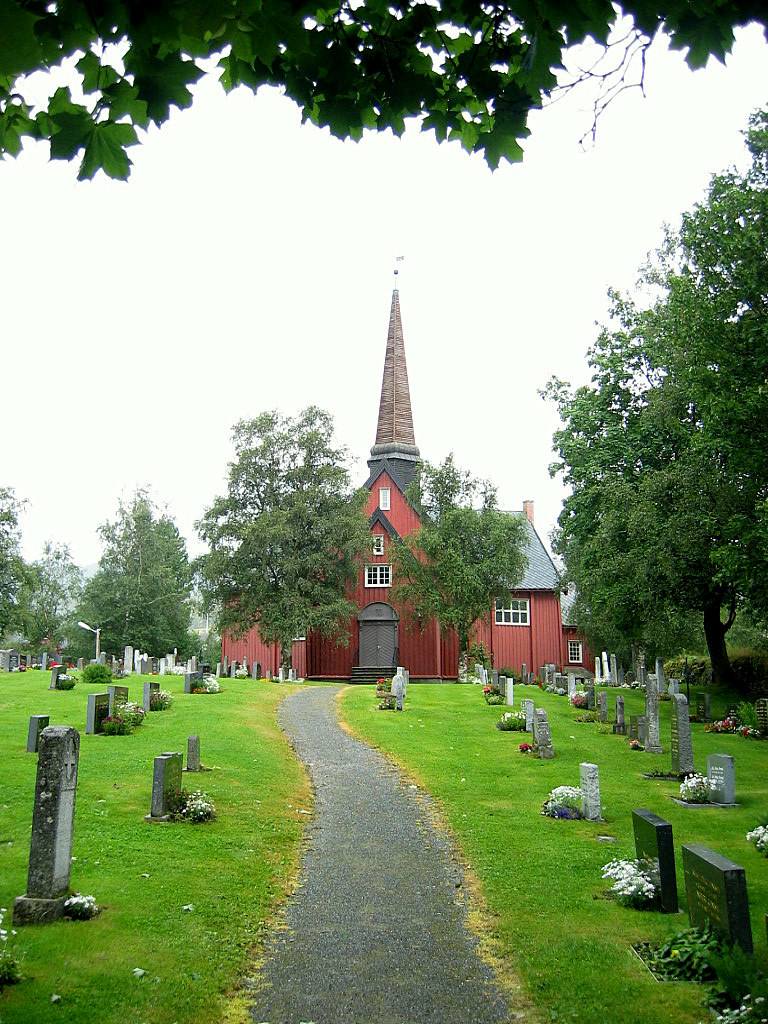
View of Rennebu Church

The municipality of Rennebu was established in 1839 when it was separated from Meldal Municipality. Initially, the population was 2,368.

During the 1960s, there were many municipal mergers across Norway due to the work of the Schei Committee. On 1 January 1966, the parish of Innset (population: 420) was transferred from Kvikne Municipality (and also from Hedmark county) to Rennebu Municipality (and Sør-Trøndelag county). Then on 1 January 1970, the Garlia area (population: 5) was transferred from Tynset Municipality (and Hedmark county) to Rennebu Municipality (and Sør-Trøndelag).

On 1 January 2018, the municipality switched from the old Sør-Trøndelag county to the new Trøndelag county.

=== Name ===
The municipality (originally the parish) is named Rennebu (Old Norse: Rennabú). The second element -bu means ‘farm, dwelling, property’. The first element is not definitively interpreted, but may be connected to the ON verb renna ‘to run, to flow, to flood’ and could refer to the valley with its river course. It has also been suggested that the element renna may be related to ON rann ‘house, home’, possibly an undocumented plural form *renni meaning ‘homes, cluster of houses’, so that the place‑name would mean ‘the settlement with clusters of houses’.

=== Coat of arms ===
The coat of arms was granted on 19 February 1982. The official blazon is "Or, a pall reversed couped gules" (Norwegian: I gull ein svevande omvend raud gaffelkross). This means the arms have a field (background) has a tincture of Or which means it is commonly colored yellow, but if it is made out of metal, then gold is used. The charge is a Y-shaped design in red. The design symbolizes the outline of the local church, Rennebu kirke (erected 1669), which is one of the oldest (and very few) churches in Norway based on a Y-shaped outline. The arms were designed by Bjørn Casper Horgen after an idea by Magne Jostein Hoel. The municipal flag has the same design as the coat of arms.

=== Churches ===
The Church of Norway has three parishes (sokn) within Rennebu Municipality. It is part of the Gauldal prosti (deanery) in the Diocese of Nidaros.

Churches in Rennebu Municipality
Parish (sokn)	Church name	Location of the church	Year built
Berkåk	Berkåk Church	Berkåk	1878
Innset	Innset Church	Innset	2000
Rennebu	Rennebu Church	Voll	1669
Rennebu	Nerskogen Chapel	Nerskogen	1962

== Geography ==
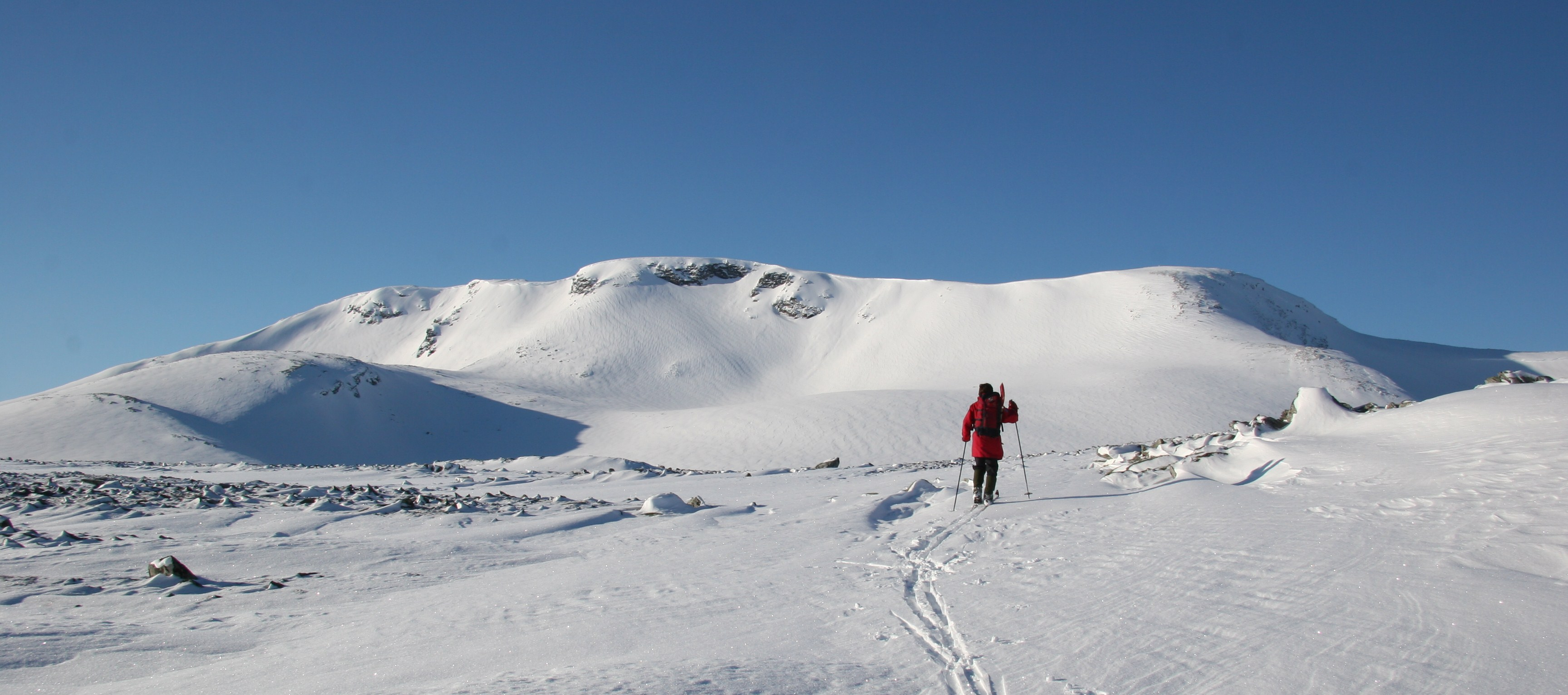
Svarthetta mountain

Rennebu Municipality mainly consists of uncultivated areas of mountains, lakes, moors, and forests. The highest point in the municipality is the 1,548-metre (5,079 ft) tall Svarthetta. The mountain Ilfjellet is located in the northeastern part of the municipality.

The Orkla River flows through the municipality from south to north in the Orkdalen valley. The northeasternmost part of the Trollheimen mountain range also lies within Rennebu Municipality.

The municipality is surrounded by Oppdal Municipality and Rindal Municipality to the west, Orkland Municipality to the north, Midtre Gauldal Municipality to the east, and Tynset Municipality to the south. The Forollhogna National Park lies in the extreme southeastern part of the municipality.

== Climate ==
Situated at some altitude inland in mid-Norway, Rennebu Municipality has a boreal climate. 10 of the 12 record lows are from 1967 or older. The all-time low −37.6 °C (−35.7 °F) is from February 1953. The most recent record low is August from 1987. The all-time high 30.4 °C (86.7 °F) is from July 1991. Snow depth recording in Berkåk (475 m) shows that Berkåk on average has 138 days/year with at least 25 cm snow on the ground (base period 1991–2008).

Climate data for Berkåk 1991-2020 (440 m, precipitation 223 m, precipitation days 1961-90, extremes 1938-2008 includes earlier stations)
Month	Jan	Feb	Mar	Apr	May	Jun	Jul	Aug	Sep	Oct	Nov	Dec	Year
Record high °C (°F)	13.6 (56.5)	12.4 (54.3)	13.5 (56.3)	20.5 (68.9)	26.5 (79.7)	29.5 (85.1)	30.4 (86.7)	29.6 (85.3)	27.2 (81.0)	21.6 (70.9)	13.5 (56.3)	11.5 (52.7)	30.4 (86.7)
Daily mean °C (°F)	−4.7 (23.5)	−4.5 (23.9)	−1.9 (28.6)	2.2 (36.0)	6.6 (43.9)	10.4 (50.7)	13.1 (55.6)	12.2 (54.0)	8.2 (46.8)	2.6 (36.7)	−1.9 (28.6)	−4.7 (23.5)	3.1 (37.7)
Record low °C (°F)	−33.1 (−27.6)	−37.6 (−35.7)	−31.6 (−24.9)	−24.8 (−12.6)	−12 (10)	−5.6 (21.9)	−2 (28)	−2.6 (27.3)	−8 (18)	−21 (−6)	−26.5 (−15.7)	−31.1 (−24.0)	−37.6 (−35.7)
Average precipitation mm (inches)	68 (2.7)	58 (2.3)	60 (2.4)	42 (1.7)	44 (1.7)	79 (3.1)	77 (3.0)	89 (3.5)	66 (2.6)	64 (2.5)	60 (2.4)	70 (2.8)	777 (30.7)
Average precipitation days (≥ 1.0 mm)	10	8	8	9	8	11	14	12	13	11	10	11	125
Source: Norwegian Meteorological Institute

== Government ==
Rennebu Municipality is responsible for primary education (through 10th grade), outpatient health services, senior citizen services, welfare and other social services, zoning, economic development, and municipal roads and utilities. The municipality is governed by a municipal council of directly elected representatives. The mayor is indirectly elected by a vote of the municipal council. The municipality is under the jurisdiction of the Trøndelag District Court and the Frostating Court of Appeal. Waste management was from 2008 handled by the inter-municipal agency HAMOS Forvaltning. It merged into ReMidt in 2020.

=== Municipal council ===
The municipal council (Kommunestyre) of Rennebu Municipality is made up of 21 representatives that are elected to four year terms. The tables below show the current and historical composition of the council by political party.

Rennebu kommunestyre 2023–2027
Party name (in Norwegian)	Number of representatives
Labour Party (Arbeiderpartiet)	5
Christian Democratic Party (Kristelig Folkeparti)	5
Centre Party (Senterpartiet)	6
Joint list of the Conservative Party (Høyre) and the Liberal Party (Venstre)	5
Total number of members:	21

Rennebu kommunestyre 2019–2023
Party name (in Norwegian)	Number of representatives
Labour Party (Arbeiderpartiet)	9
Conservative Party (Høyre)	1
Christian Democratic Party (Kristelig Folkeparti)	3
Centre Party (Senterpartiet)	7
Liberal Party (Venstre)	1
Total number of members:	21

Rennebu kommunestyre 2015–2019
Party name (in Norwegian)	Number of representatives
Labour Party (Arbeiderpartiet)	8
Christian Democratic Party (Kristelig Folkeparti)	4
Centre Party (Senterpartiet)	6
Joint list of the Conservative Party (Høyre) and the Liberal Party (Venstre)	3
Total number of members:	21

Rennebu kommunestyre 2011–2015
Party name (in Norwegian)	Number of representatives
Labour Party (Arbeiderpartiet)	6
Christian Democratic Party (Kristelig Folkeparti)	6
Centre Party (Senterpartiet)	6
Joint list of the Conservative Party (Høyre) and the Liberal Party (Venstre)	3
Total number of members:	21

Rennebu kommunestyre 2007–2011
Party name (in Norwegian)	Number of representatives
Labour Party (Arbeiderpartiet)	4
Christian Democratic Party (Kristelig Folkeparti)	4
Centre Party (Senterpartiet)	6
Joint list of the Conservative Party (Høyre) and the Liberal Party (Venstre)	7
Total number of members:	21

Rennebu kommunestyre 2003–2007
Party name (in Norwegian)	Number of representatives
Labour Party (Arbeiderpartiet)	4
Conservative Party (Høyre)	1
Christian Democratic Party (Kristelig Folkeparti)	4
Centre Party (Senterpartiet)	10
Socialist Left Party (Sosialistisk Venstreparti)	1
Liberal Party (Venstre)	1
Total number of members:	21

Rennebu kommunestyre 1999–2003
Party name (in Norwegian)	Number of representatives
Labour Party (Arbeiderpartiet)	6
Conservative Party (Høyre)	2
Christian Democratic Party (Kristelig Folkeparti)	6
Centre Party (Senterpartiet)	6
Liberal Party (Venstre)	1
Total number of members:	21

Rennebu kommunestyre 1995–1999
Party name (in Norwegian)	Number of representatives
Labour Party (Arbeiderpartiet)	7
Conservative Party (Høyre)	1
Christian Democratic Party (Kristelig Folkeparti)	5
Centre Party (Senterpartiet)	7
Liberal Party (Venstre)	1
Total number of members:	21

Rennebu kommunestyre 1991–1995
Party name (in Norwegian)	Number of representatives
Labour Party (Arbeiderpartiet)	5
Conservative Party (Høyre)	1
Christian Democratic Party (Kristelig Folkeparti)	5
Centre Party (Senterpartiet)	8
Socialist Left Party (Sosialistisk Venstreparti)	1
Liberal Party (Venstre)	1
Total number of members:	21

Rennebu kommunestyre 1987–1991
Party name (in Norwegian)	Number of representatives
Labour Party (Arbeiderpartiet)	8
Conservative Party (Høyre)	2
Christian Democratic Party (Kristelig Folkeparti)	5
Centre Party (Senterpartiet)	4
Joint list of the Liberal Party (Venstre) and Liberal People's Party (Liberale Folkepartiet)	2
Total number of members:	21

Rennebu kommunestyre 1983–1987
Party name (in Norwegian)	Number of representatives
Labour Party (Arbeiderpartiet)	8
Conservative Party (Høyre)	2
Christian Democratic Party (Kristelig Folkeparti)	4
Liberal People's Party (Liberale Folkepartiet)	1
Centre Party (Senterpartiet)	5
Liberal Party (Venstre)	1
Total number of members:	21

Rennebu kommunestyre 1979–1983
Party name (in Norwegian)	Number of representatives
Labour Party (Arbeiderpartiet)	7
Conservative Party (Høyre)	2
Christian Democratic Party (Kristelig Folkeparti)	4
New People's Party (Nye Folkepartiet)	1
Centre Party (Senterpartiet)	5
Liberal Party (Venstre)	2
Total number of members:	21

Rennebu kommunestyre 1975–1979
Party name (in Norwegian)	Number of representatives
Labour Party (Arbeiderpartiet)	7
Conservative Party (Høyre)	1
Christian Democratic Party (Kristelig Folkeparti)	4
New People's Party (Nye Folkepartiet)	1
Centre Party (Senterpartiet)	7
Liberal Party (Venstre)	1
Total number of members:	21

Rennebu kommunestyre 1971–1975
Party name (in Norwegian)	Number of representatives
Labour Party (Arbeiderpartiet)	7
Conservative Party (Høyre)	1
Christian Democratic Party (Kristelig Folkeparti)	5
Centre Party (Senterpartiet)	6
Liberal Party (Venstre)	2
Total number of members:	21

Rennebu kommunestyre 1967–1971
Party name (in Norwegian)	Number of representatives
Labour Party (Arbeiderpartiet)	8
Christian Democratic Party (Kristelig Folkeparti)	5
Centre Party (Senterpartiet)	4
Liberal Party (Venstre)	4
Total number of members:	21

Rennebu kommunestyre 1963–1967
Party name (in Norwegian)	Number of representatives
Labour Party (Arbeiderpartiet)	7
Christian Democratic Party (Kristelig Folkeparti)	4
Centre Party (Senterpartiet)	3
Liberal Party (Venstre)	3
Total number of members:	17

Rennebu herredsstyre 1959–1963
Party name (in Norwegian)	Number of representatives
Labour Party (Arbeiderpartiet)	7
Christian Democratic Party (Kristelig Folkeparti)	3
Centre Party (Senterpartiet)	3
Liberal Party (Venstre)	4
Total number of members:	17

Rennebu herredsstyre 1955–1959
Party name (in Norwegian)	Number of representatives
Labour Party (Arbeiderpartiet)	7
Christian Democratic Party (Kristelig Folkeparti)	3
Farmers' Party (Bondepartiet)	2
Liberal Party (Venstre)	5
Total number of members:	17

Rennebu herredsstyre 1951–1955
Party name (in Norwegian)	Number of representatives
Labour Party (Arbeiderpartiet)	5
Christian Democratic Party (Kristelig Folkeparti)	4
Farmers' Party (Bondepartiet)	2
Liberal Party (Venstre)	5
Total number of members:	16

Rennebu herredsstyre 1947–1951
Party name (in Norwegian)	Number of representatives
Labour Party (Arbeiderpartiet)	6
Christian Democratic Party (Kristelig Folkeparti)	3
Farmers' Party (Bondepartiet)	2
Liberal Party (Venstre)	5
Total number of members:	16

Rennebu herredsstyre 1945–1947
Party name (in Norwegian)	Number of representatives
Labour Party (Arbeiderpartiet)	7
Christian Democratic Party (Kristelig Folkeparti)	3
Farmers' Party (Bondepartiet)	1
Liberal Party (Venstre)	5
Total number of members:	16

Rennebu herredsstyre 1937–1941*
Party name (in Norwegian)	Number of representatives
Labour Party (Arbeiderpartiet)	7
Farmers' Party (Bondepartiet)	4
Liberal Party (Venstre)	5
Total number of members:	16
Note: Due to the German occupation of Norway during World War II, no elections were held for new municipal councils until after the war ended in 1945.

=== Mayors ===
The mayor (Norwegian: ordfører) of Rennebu Municipality is the political leader of the municipality and the chairperson of the municipal council. Here is a list of people who have held this position:

- 1838–1845: Ingebrigt Trondsen Eggan
- 1846–1849: Engel Meslo
- 1850–1851: Ole Olsen
- 1852–1853: Ingebrigt Stavne Sr.
- 1854–1857: Engel Meslo
- 1858–1859: Torger Rise
- 1860-1860: Mikkel Kosberg
- 1860–1861: Ingebrigt Stavne Sr.
- 1862–1863: Torger Rise
- 1864–1867: Johan Fredrik Jørgen Schwabe
- 1868–1871: Einar Hoel
- 1872–1877: Ingebrigt Meslo
- 1878–1881: Arnt Johnsen Mærk
- 1882–1893: Ingebrigt Meslo (MV)
- 1894–1903: Trond Trondsen Eggan (V)
- 1903–1904: Sivert Gunnes (V)
- 1905–1907: Ingebrigt Stavne Jr. (V)
- 1908–1913: Sivert Gunnes (V)
- 1914–1922: Angrim Brattset (V)
- 1923–1925: Mikkel Voll (V)
- 1926–1931: Ola Mikkelsen Gunnes (V)
- 1932–1934: Jon Gunnes (V)
- 1935–1937: Karl Johnson (V)
- 1938–1942: Erik Myrmo (Bp)
- 1942–1945: Inge Clett Mull (NS)
- 1945-1945: Erik Myrmo (Bp)
- 1946–1947: Arnt Kjelland (V)
- 1948–1951: Karl Johnson (V)
- 1952–1955: Ingebrigt Haugset (Bp)
- 1956–1959: John M. Meslo (V)
- 1960–1965: Jens P. Flå (KrF)
- 1965–1967: Torleif Sundset (V)
- 1968–1973: Jens P. Flå (KrF)
- 1973–1975: Kåre Kleven (Sp)
- 1976–1985: Magne Jostein Hoel (Sp)
- 1986–1991: Alf Gunnes (KrF)
- 1992–1995: Magne Jostein Hoel (Sp)
- 1995–1999: Tora Husan (KrF)
- 1999–2006: Trond Jære (Sp)
- 2006–2011: Bjørn Rogstad (H)
- 2011–2015: Ola T. Lånke (KrF)
- 2015–2023: Ola Øie (Ap)
- 2023–present: Per Arne Lium (Sp)

== Notable people ==
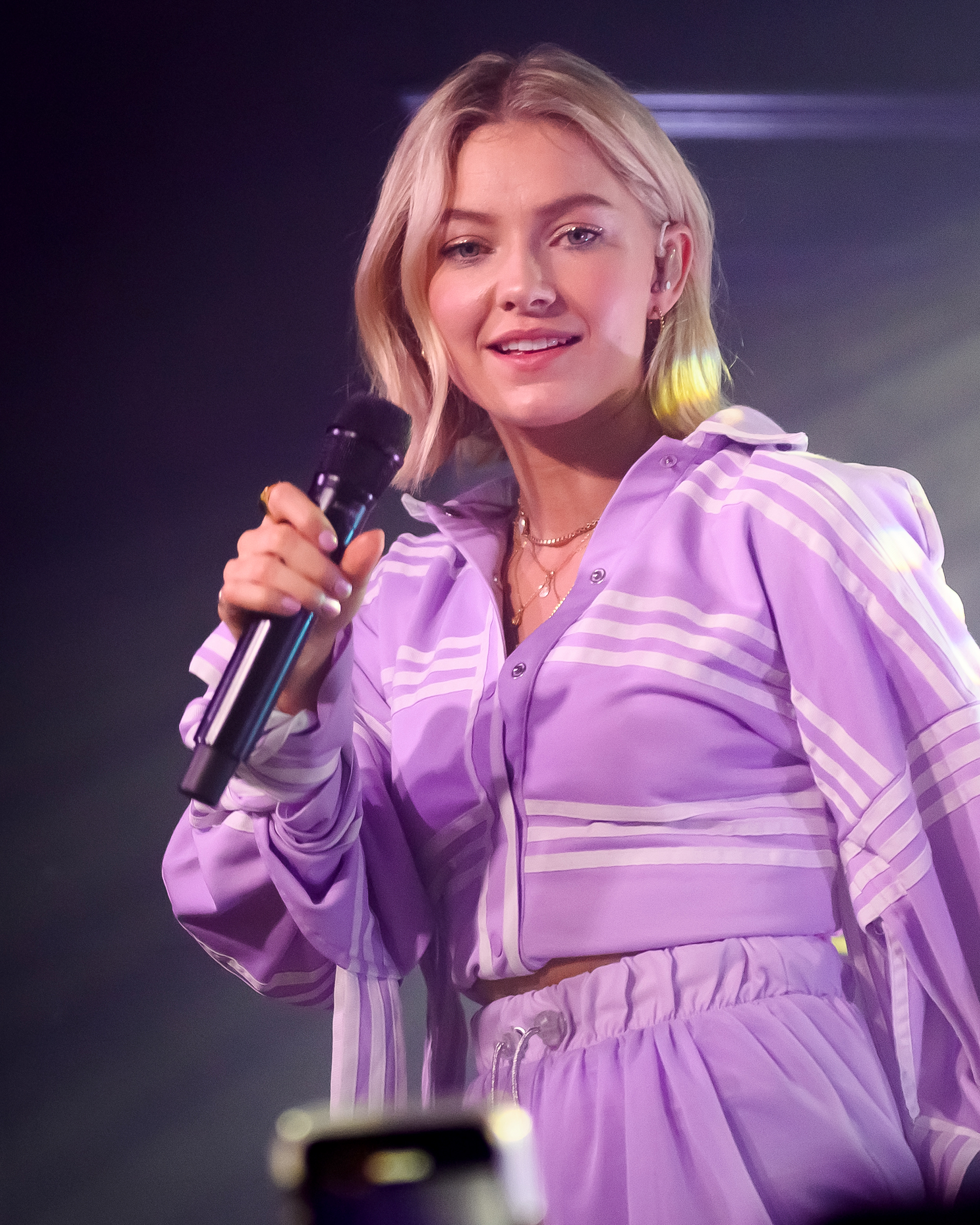
Astrid S. 2019

- Jürgen Christoph von Koppelow (1684 in Rennebu – 1770), a Norwegian nobleman and military officer
- Jens P. Flå (born 1923 in Rennebu - 2002), a Norwegian politician and Mayor of Rennebu from 1959 to 1969
- Heidi Skjerve (born 1979 in Rennebu), a jazz singer and composer
- Astrid Smeplass (born 1996 in Berkåk), a singer and songwriter who uses the stage name Astrid S

=== Sport ===
- Magne Myrmo (born 1943 in Rennebu), a former cross-country skier and silver medallist at the 1972 Winter Olympics
- Vebjørn Rodal (born 1972 in Berkåk), a former 800-metre runner and gold medallist at the 1996 Summer Olympics
- Vegard Skjerve (born 1988 in Rennebu), a retired Norwegian footballer with 276 caps with FK Haugesund
- Jo Sondre Aas (born 1989 in Grindal), a Norwegian football player with over 330 club caps
