= Orkdalen =

Valley in Trøndelag, Norway

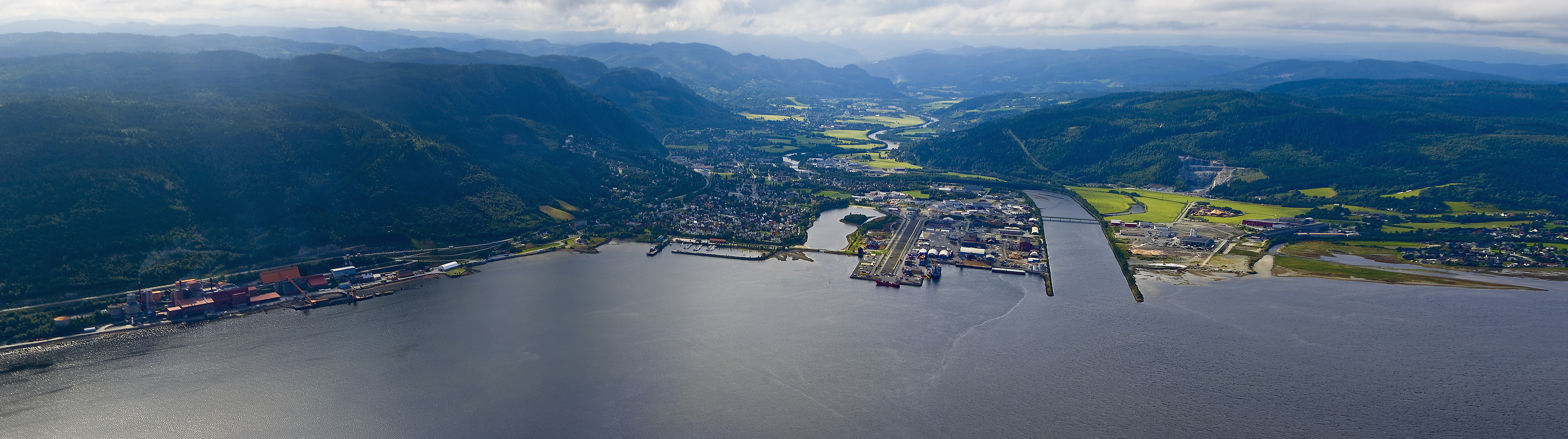
- View of the Orkdalen valley
- Length: 100 kilometres (62 mi) N-S

Geology
- Type: River valley

Geography
- Location: Trøndelag, Norway
- Population centers: Orkanger, Meldal, Berkåk
- Coordinates: 63.0555°N 09.6191°E
- Rivers: Orkla

Location
- Interactive map of the valley

Orkdalen (English: the Orkla Valley) is a valley and a traditional Norwegian district in Trøndelag county, Norway. In the early Viking Age, before King Harald Fairhair, the Orkla Valley was also a petty kingdom.

The valley begins in the high Dovrefjell mountains and creates a deep, narrow valley. As the river progresses, the valley widens and flattens out. From Rennebu northwards, the valley is fairly heavily populated with good farmland. At the mouth of the river (the north end of the valley) is the town of Orkanger, the largest population centre in the valley.

The district encompasses Rennebu Municipality and Orkland Municipality, both of which surround the Orkla River in the valley. Oppdal Municipality and Skaun Municipality are often traditionally counted as a parts of the district also even though they lie outside the actual valley of the river Orkla. The river itself actually begins in Oppdal Municipality and then winds its way north to the Trondheimsfjord.
