= Innset =

Innset may refer to the following places:

== Places ==
- Innset, Troms, a village in Bardu municipality in Troms county, Norway
- Innset, Trøndelag, a village in Rennebu municipality in Trøndelag county, Norway
- Innset Church, a church in Rennebu municipality in Trøndelag county, Norway
