= Stave church =

Wooden Christian church building

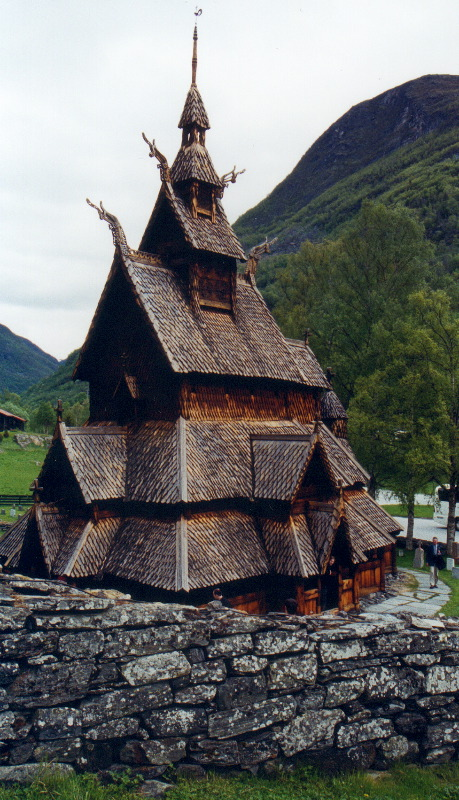
Borgund Stave Church in Borgund in Lærdal Municipality. It is one of Norway's most visited stave churches.

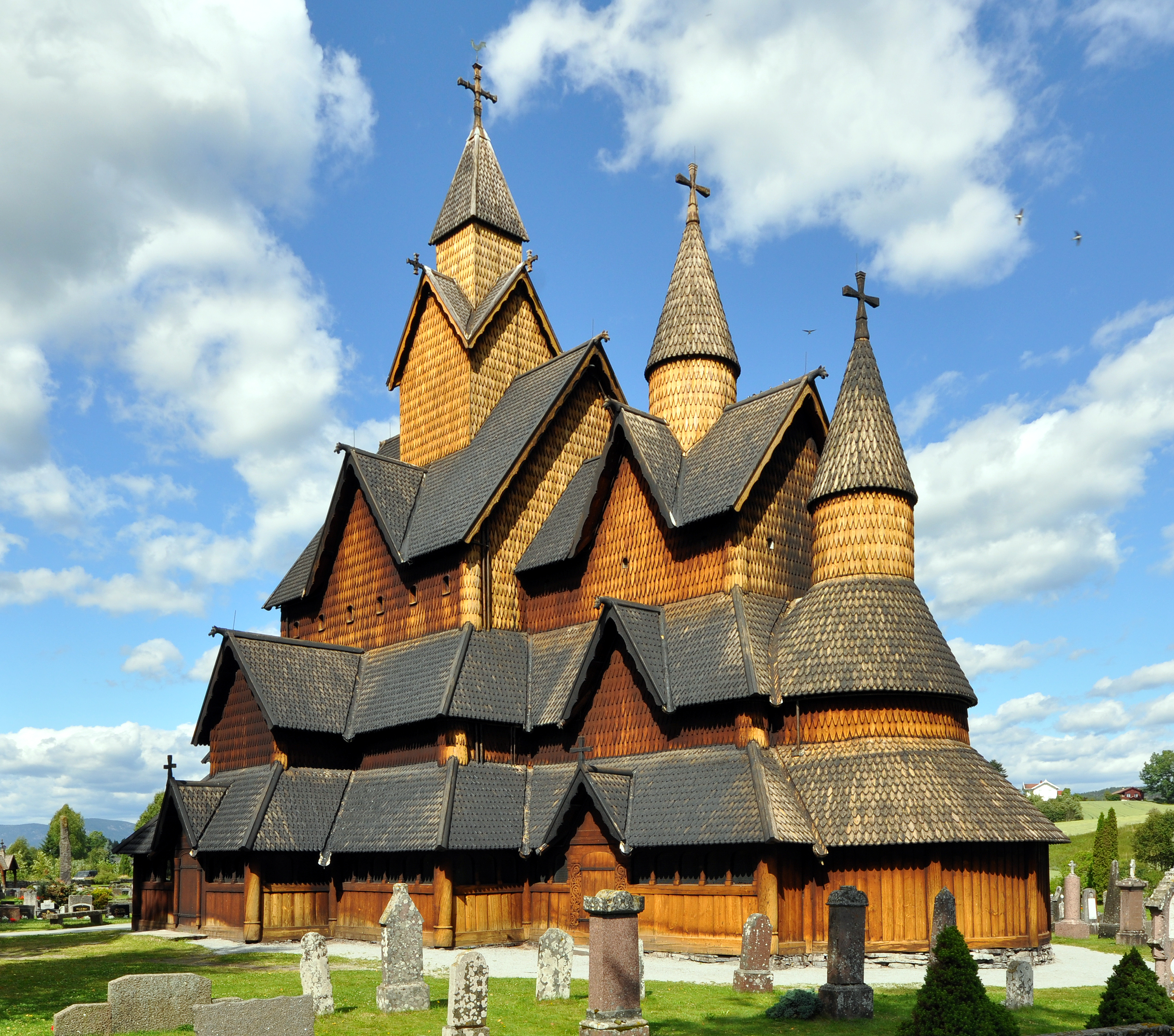
Heddal Stave Church, Notodden Municipality, the largest stave church in Norway

A stave church is a medieval wooden Christian church building once common in north-western Europe. The name derives from the building's structure of post and lintel construction, a type of timber framing where the load-bearing ore-pine posts are called stafr in Old Norse (stav in modern Norwegian). Two related church building types also named for their structural elements, the post church and palisade church, are often called 'stave churches'.

Originally much more widespread, most of the surviving stave churches are in Norway. The only remaining medieval stave churches outside Norway are: Hedared Stave Church (c. 1500) in Sweden and the Vang Stave Church which was built in Norway and relocated in 1842 to contemporary Karpacz in the Karkonosze mountains of Poland. One other church, the Anglo-Saxon Greensted Church in England, exhibits many similarities with a stave church but is generally considered a palisade church.

== Construction ==
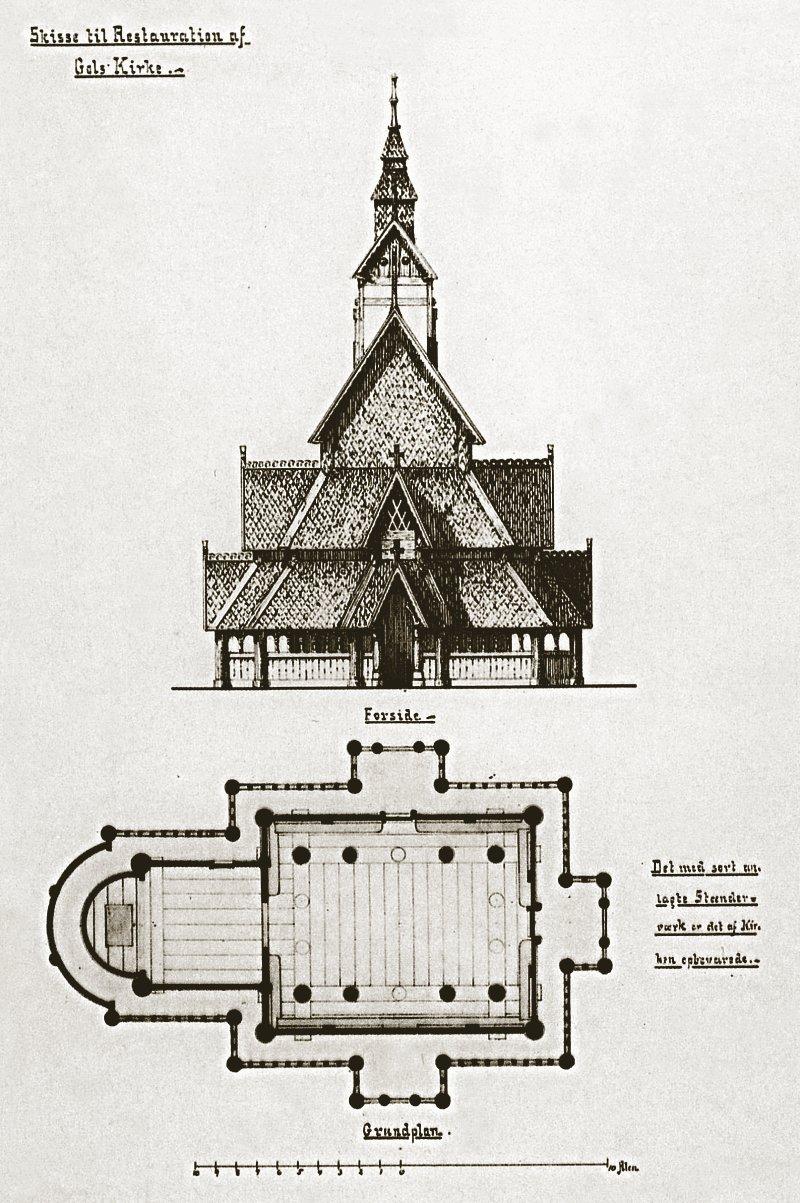
Drawing during reconstruction of Gol stave church by T. Prytz, 1883

Archaeological excavations have shown that stave churches are descended from palisade constructions and from later churches with earth-bound posts.

Similar palisade constructions are known from buildings from the Viking Age. Logs were split in two halves, set or rammed into the earth (generally called post in ground construction) and given a roof. This proved a simple but very strong form of construction. If set in gravel, the wall could last many decades, even centuries. An archaeological excavation in Lund uncovered the postholes of several such churches.

In post churches, the walls were supported by sills, leaving only the posts earth-bound. Such churches are easy to spot at archaeological sites as they leave very distinct holes where the posts were once placed. Occasionally some of the wood remains, making it possible to date the church more accurately using radiocarbon dating or dendrochronology. Under the Urnes Stave Church, remains of two such churches have been found, with Christian graves discovered beneath the oldest church structure.

A single church of palisade construction has been discovered under the Hemse Stave Church.

The next design phase resulted from the observation that earthbound posts were susceptible to humidity, causing them to rot away over time. To prevent this, the posts were placed on top of large stones, significantly increasing their lifespans. The Røldal Stave Church is believed to be of this type.

In later churches the posts were set on a raised sill frame resting on stone foundations. This is the stave church in its most mature form.

It is now common to group the churches into two categories: the first, without free-standing posts, often referred to as Type A; and the second, with a raised roof and free-standing internal posts, usually called Type B.

Those with the raised roof, Type B, are often further divided into two subgroups. The first of these, the Kaupanger group, have a whole arcade row of posts and intermediate posts along the sides and details that mimic stone capitals. These churches give an impression of a basilica.

The other subgroup is the Borgund group. In these churches the posts are connected halfway up with one or two horizontal double ″pincer beams″ with semicircular indentations, clasping the row of posts from both sides. Cross-braces are inserted between the posts and the upper and lower pincer beams (or above the single pincer beam), forming a very rigid interconnection, and resembling the triforium of stone basilicas. This design made it possible to omit the freestanding lower part of intermediate posts. In some churches only the four corner posts remain (for example in Lomen Stave Church).

Many stave churches had or still have outer galleries or ambulatories around their whole perimeters, loosely connected to the plank walls. These probably served to protect the church from a harsh climate, and for processions.

=== Single-nave church, Type A ===
Plans of Type A churches

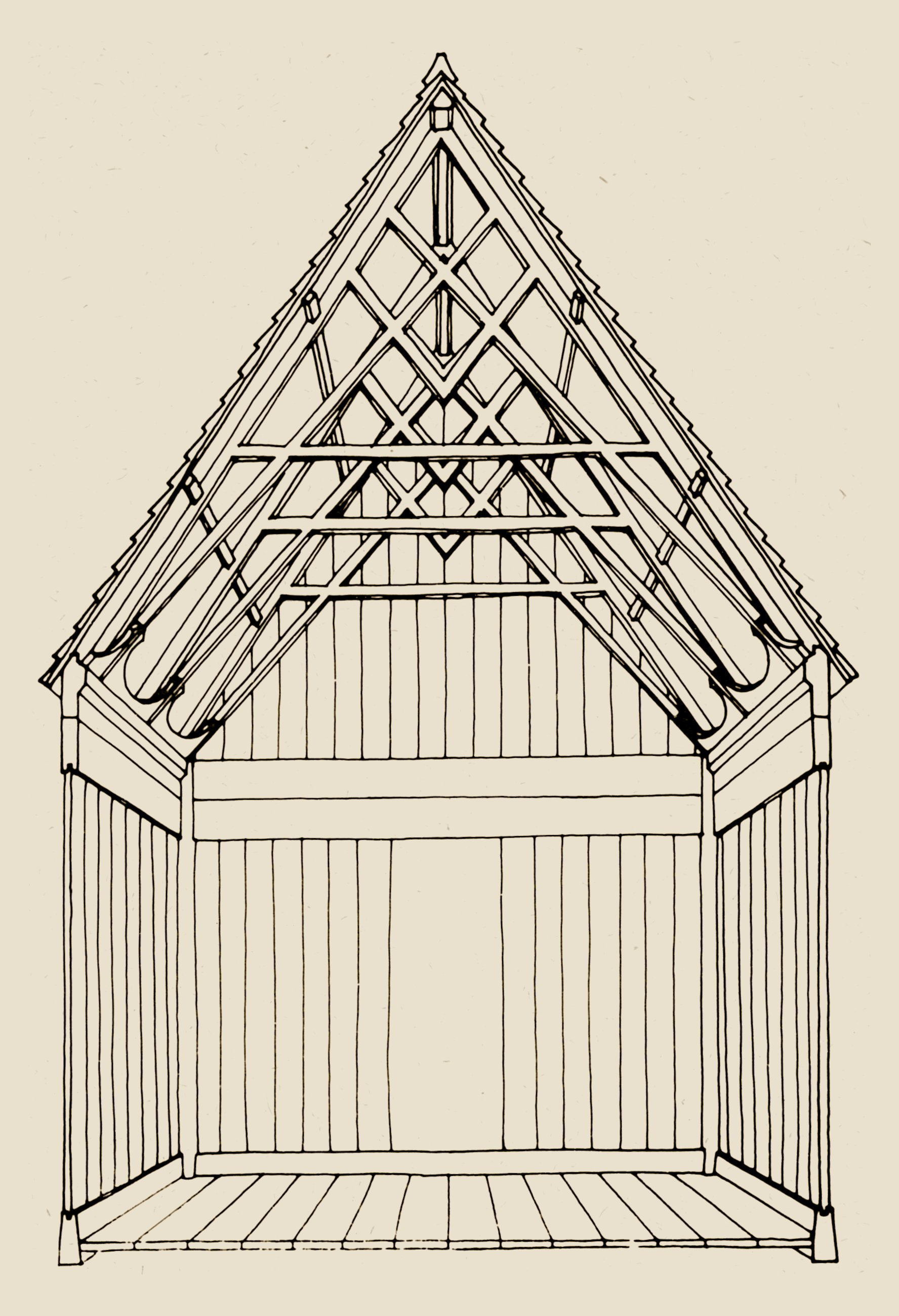
Holtålen Stave Church, drawing by Håkon Christie.

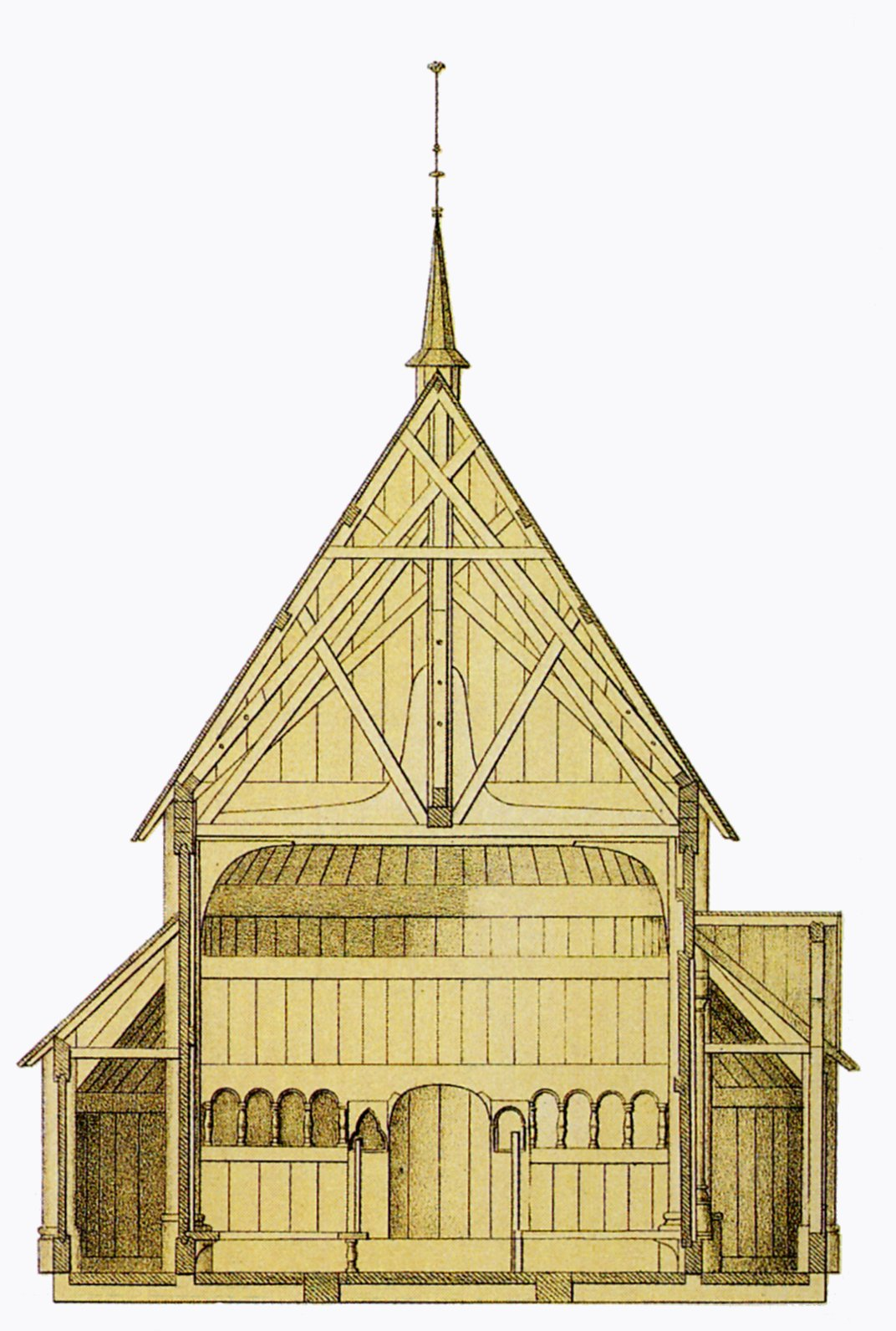
Reinli Stave Church, drawing by Georg Andreas Bull, ca. 1855.

At the base of Type A churches, there are four heavy sill beams on a low foundation of stones. These are interconnected in the corner notch, forming a rigid sill frame. The corner posts or staves (Norwegian: stavene) are cross-cut at the lower end and fit over the corner notches and cover them, protecting them from moisture.

On top of the sill beam is a groove into which the lower ends of the wall planks (Norwegian: veggtilene) fit. The last wall plank is wedge-shaped and rammed into place. When the wall is filled in with planks, the frame is completed by a wall plate (Norwegian: stavlægje) with a groove on the bottom, holding the top ends of the wall planks. The whole structure consists of frames – a sill frame resting on the stone foundation, and the four wall frames made up of sills, corner posts and wall plate.

The wall plates support the roof trusses, consisting of a pair of principal rafters and an additional pair of intersecting "scissor rafters". For lateral bracing, additional wooden brackets (Norwegian: bueknær) are inserted between the rafters.

Every piece is locked into position by other pieces, making for a very rigid construction; yet all points otherwise susceptible to the harsh weather are covered.

- The single-nave church has a square nave and a narrower square choir. This type of stave church was common at the beginning of the 12th century.
- The long church (Norwegian: Langkyrkje), has a rectangular plan with nave and choir of the same width. The nave will usually take up two-thirds of the whole length. This type was common at the end of the 13th century.
- The center-post church (Norwegian: Midtmastkyrkje), has a single central post reaching all the way up to and connected to the roof construction. But the roof is a simple hipped one, without the raised central part of the Type B churches. This variation on the common type of church, found in Numedal and Hallingdal, dates to around 1200.

Single-nave churches in Norway: Grip, Haltdalen, Undredal, Hedal, Reinli, Eidsborg, Rollag, Uvdal, Nore, Høyjord, Røldal, and Garmo.

The only remaining church of this type outside Norway is the Hedared Stave Church in Sweden, which shows similarities with the Haltdalen Stave Church.

=== Church with a raised roof, Type B ===
Plans of Type B churches

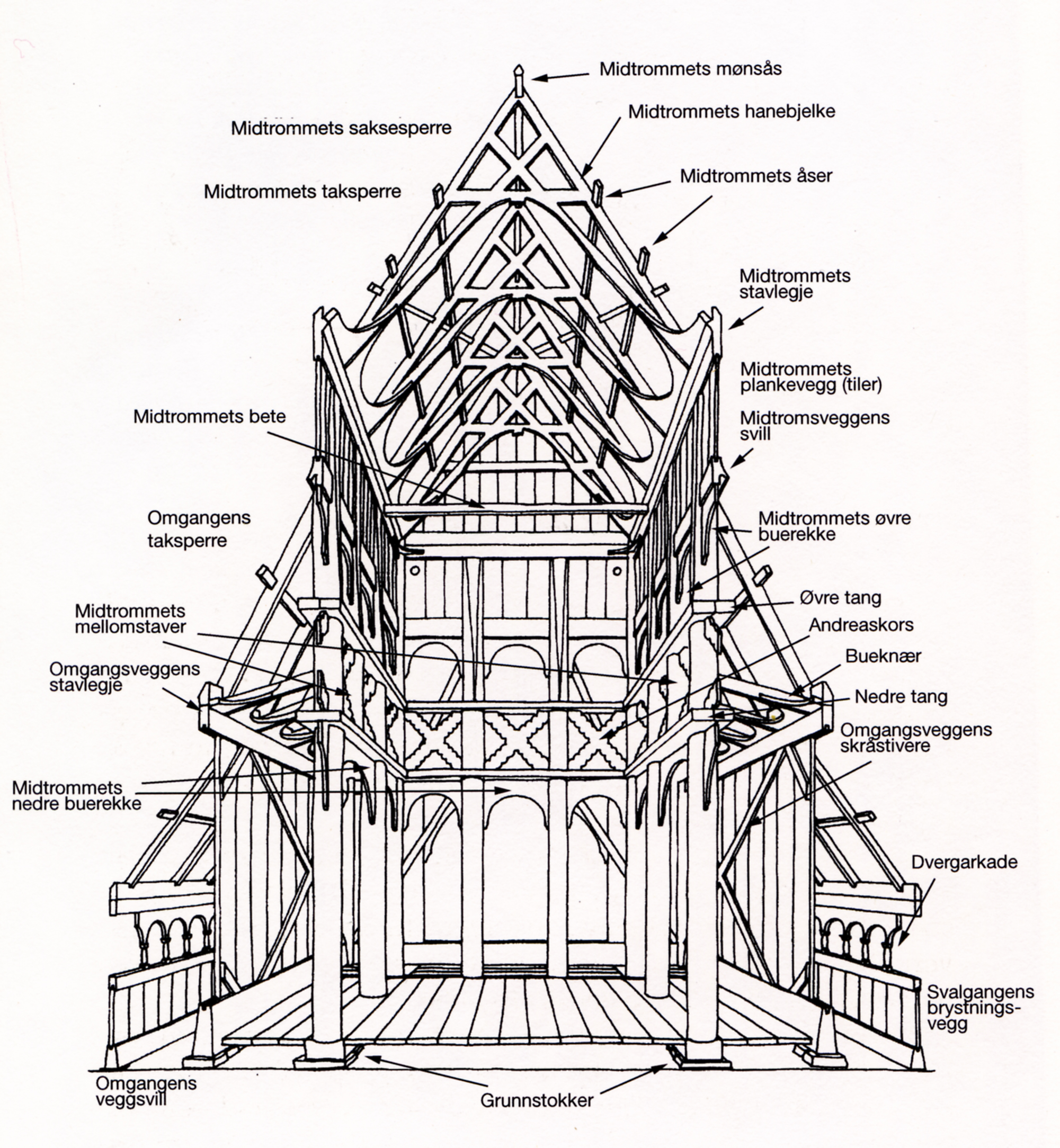
Håkon Christie drawing of Borgund Stave Church.

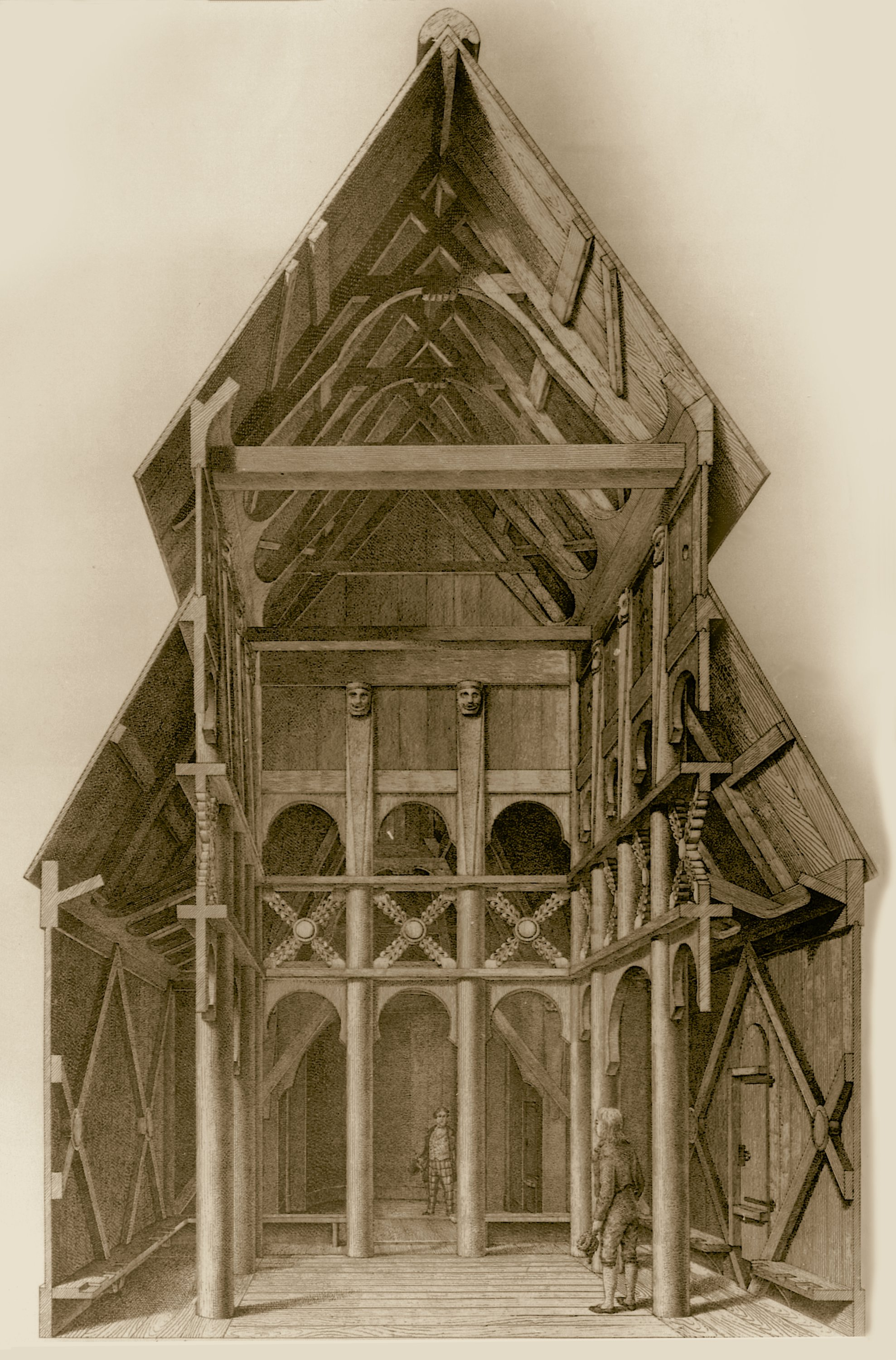
G. A. Bull drawing of Borgund Stave Church.

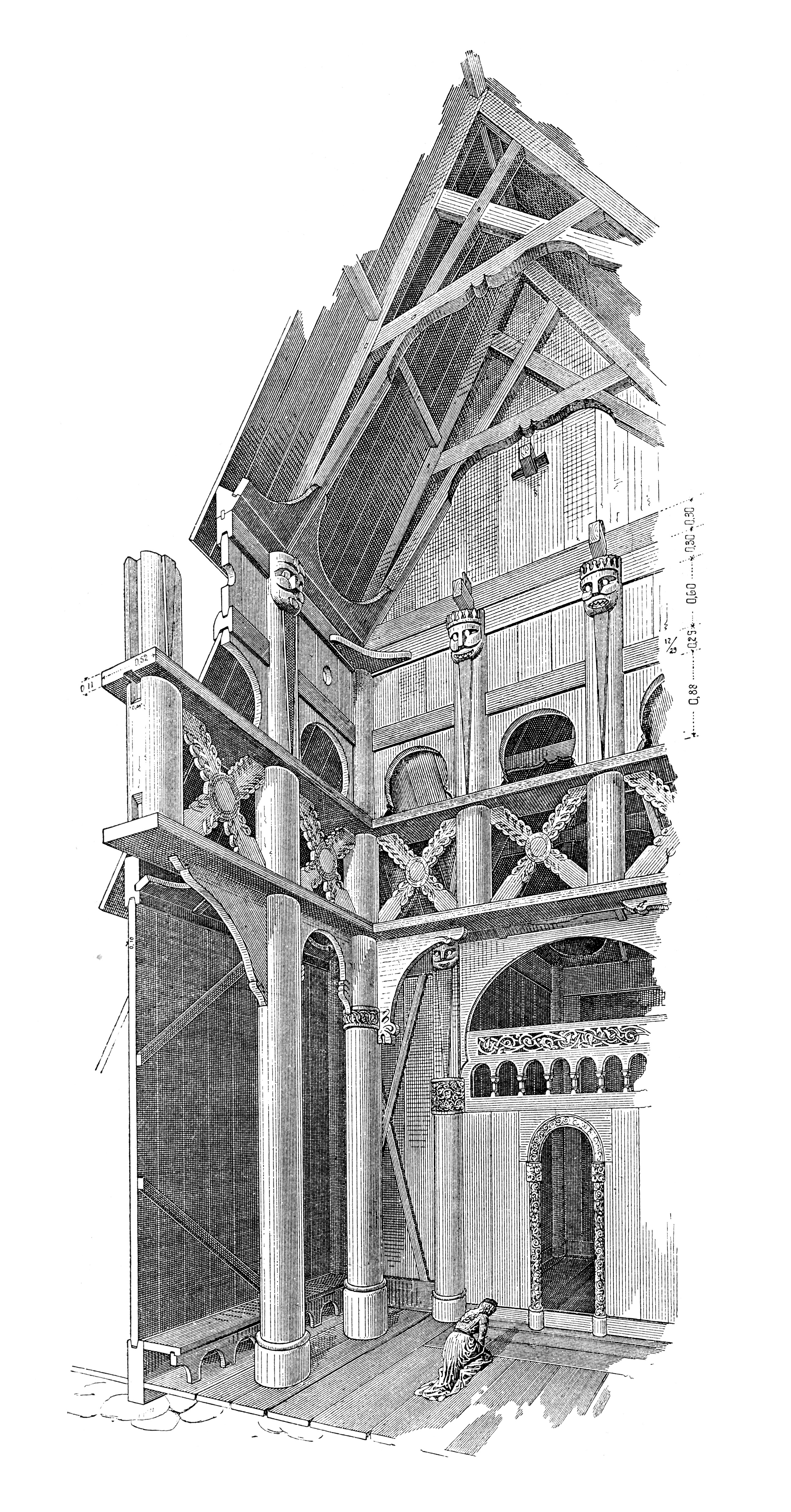
Gol Stave Church. The drawing is slightly erroneous, as the sill under the church floor is missing.

On the stone foundation, four huge ground beams (Norwegian: grunnstokker) are placed like a ⌗ sign, their ends protruding 1–2 metres (3 ft 3 in – 6 ft 7 in) from the lap joint where they intersect. The ends of these beams support the sills of the outer walls, forming a separate horizontal frame. The tall internal posts are placed on the internal frame of ground beams, and carry the main roof above the central nave (Norwegian: skip). On the outer frame of sills rest the main wall planks (Norwegian: veggtiler), carrying the roof over the pentice or aisles (Norwegian: omgang) surrounding the central space. The roof thus slopes down in two steps, as in a basilica.

The tall internal posts (staver) are interconnected with brackets (bueknær), and also connected to the outer walls with aisle rafters, creating a laterally rigid construction. Closer to the top of the posts (staver), shorter sills inserted between them support the upper wall (tilevegg). On top of the posts wall plates (stavlægjer) support the roof trusses, similar to those of the single-nave churches.

The Kaupanger group consists of: Kaupanger, Urnes, Hopperstad, and Lom.

The Borgund group consists of: Borgund, Gol, Hegge, Høre, Lomen, Ringebu, and Øye.

This form of a church can also be recognized from the holes which remain from earlier earth-bound post churches built on the same sites. Little is known about what these older churches actually looked like or how they were constructed, as they were all destroyed or replaced many centuries ago.

=== Construction techniques ===
==== Palisade work ====
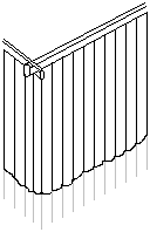
Palisade work

The oldest technique is often called palisade work and was a self-supporting wall construction with densely placed earthen pillars or planks, which enclosed a room and at the same time carried the roof. Later, split logs were used, which gave the walls a flat inside, and the edges could be leveled or fitted with tongue and groove. Palisade churches have not been found in Norway.

To prevent early decay, the posts or planks were tarred, and the lower ends were charred by burning. The palisade rows were often placed in ditches filled with stone. It was long thought that this technique disappeared before the turn of the last millennium, but new research shows that it was in use right up to the beginning of the 12th century.

The only structure in this technique that has survived into our time is a wall in the middle section of Greensted Church in England. This led to this church being for a long time considered the oldest wooden structure in Europe. A common dating of the church was about the year 845, but modern dendrochronological dating estimates the church's year of construction to the period just after the year 1053 (+10 / −55 years).

==== The post technique ====
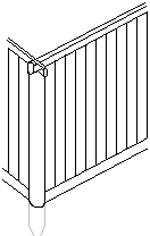
The post technique

By lifting the pole planks up from the ground and placing them on sleepers clamped between more powerful corner or intermediate posts, the risk of rot damage was reduced. Thinner materials could then be used in the complementary parts of the construction. Earthen piles of coarse round timber could stand for a relatively long time before rotting. They may have been scorched at the lower end to avoid premature decay.

Postholes, often with remnants of the former pillars, have been found under or near several stave churches and in places where legends say that there must have been churches. Remains of approximately 25 pillar buildings have been identified in Norway, and indirect traces of 7–8 more. Remains of pillar churches are also found under stone churches such as Mære and Kinsarvik.

Many of the earliest churches in Norway were built using this technique, but no such buildings have survived. It is an open question whether limited life was the reason why they were replaced by real stave churches with sleepers, or whether there were other reasons. Some of the older materials found in several of the stave churches are thought to originate from such early pillar churches, in particular at the Urnes stave church in Luster, where many building parts with wooden sheds in the urn style must have belonged to an older church. It has now been proven that the reused building parts originally belonged to the current church's forerunner, dendrochronologically dated to the period 1070–1080. However, this was not a post church, but a real stave church where corner poles and wall planks stood on sleepers.

Håkon Christie assumed that the post construction fell out of use because the posts rotted from below. Jørgen H. Jensenius believes that archaeological material does not provide unequivocal support for Christie's hypothesis; a change in size or transition to a stone church may also explain why excavated pillars fell out of use. Røldal Stave Church may have had some pillars set in the ground until 1913. In Lom Stave Church, the stone foundations have been laid approximately directly over the refilled postholes. Apart from different foundation methods, Jensenius believes that the pillar churches were essentially similar to stave churches.

==== Stave work ====
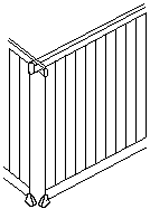
Stave work

Of buildings from the Middle Ages with standing timber in load-bearing structures, only the churches in the last developed method of construction, the stave, have been left standing in our time. By lifting the entire structure up on stone foundations and placing the poles on sleepers, the life of the structure was significantly extended. The technique was developed as early as the 11th century, but it has only been proven in the forerunner of the current stave church. This was also a real stave church, since both the corner stakes and the tiles have stood on sleepers that were reused as foundations for the existing church.

Stone as a base for poles was used as early as Roman times and additional walls in sleepers may have been used from the 400s and 600s.

=== Size ===
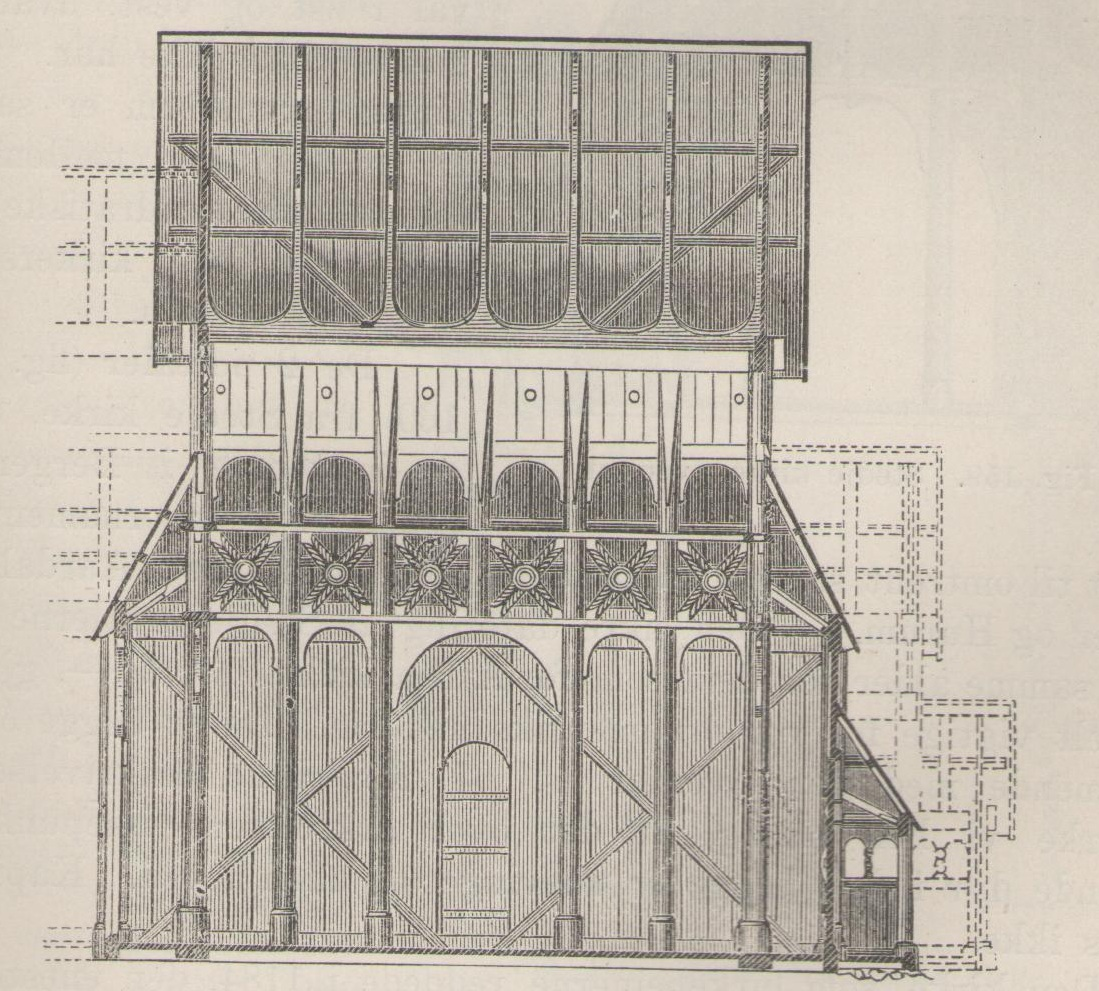
Side view of Stedje Stave Church by G. A. Bull

Lorentz Dietrichson believed that the stave churches were originally small and only later built with larger dimensions. He believed that the background for this was the construction technique. He points out that the youngest churches in the Møre type are the largest. He calculated the ground plan and area for 79 churches, and the nine largest were all in Sunnmøre with Hjørundfjord, Volda, and Norddal of over 280 square metres (3,000 sq ft). This is three times larger than, for example, Urnes and Hopperstad. According to Dietrichson, the large size of the stave churches in Sunnmøre were partly a result of later expansions. He estimated the cross arms of Volda Stave Church at 7.3 by 6 metres (24 ft × 20 ft). Hjørundfjord Stave Church was a "half-cross church" with only one cross arm measuring 7.9 by 9.1 metres (26 ft × 30 ft). The first stave church had cross arms of 7.9 by 6.7 metres (26 ft × 22 ft) after expansion. Dietrichson was unsure whether the cross arms in the Møre churches were generally added in the lath construction or whether it was a medieval stave construction. He concluded that several were originally listed as cruciform churches in stakes, including Hareid, Volda, Vatne and Ørsta. For some other churches (Bremsnes and Kornstad on Nordmøre), contemporary sources say that the cross arms were later added to the lumber. According to Håkon Christie, these churches of the Møre type had a simpler construction and were both larger and longer than the other types. Roar Hauglid estimated that most (80–90%) of the medieval Norwegian stave churches were simple single-nave buildings (Type A) and most were relatively small. Hauglid called these "the ordinary Norwegian stave church".

== History ==
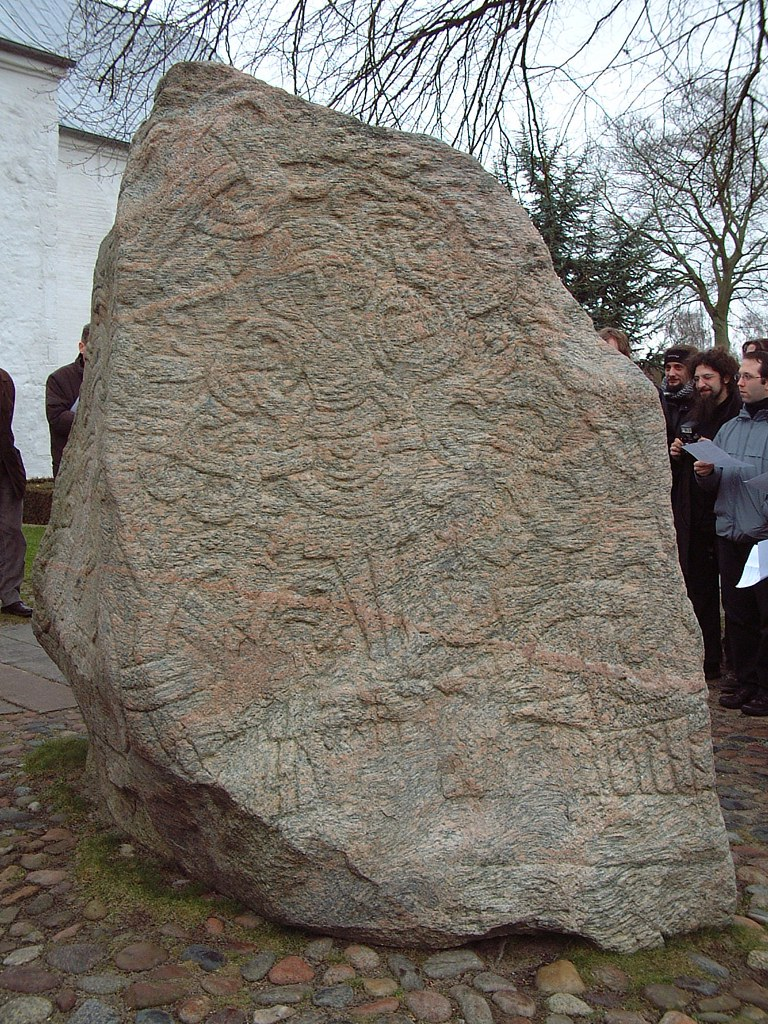
Jelling church stone in Denmark

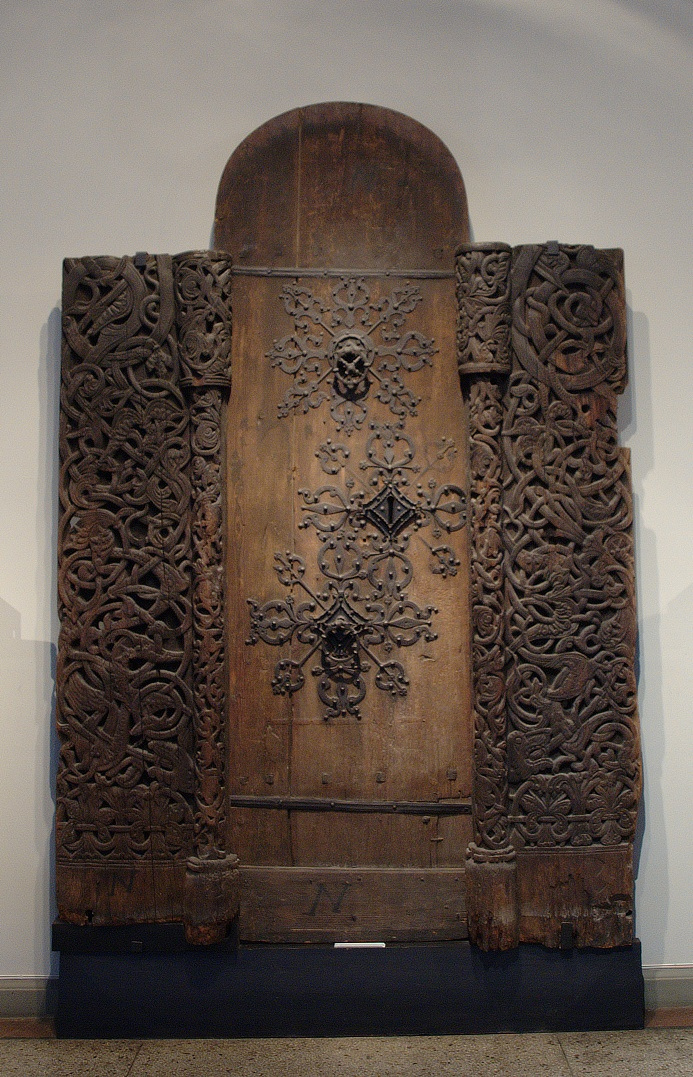
The portal from Fåberg Stave Church

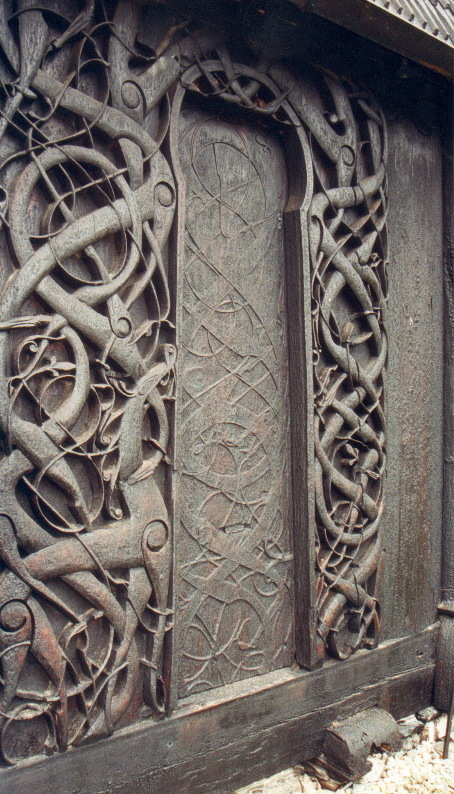
Arch decoration from Urnes Stave Church

Stave churches were once common in northern Europe. In Norway alone, it was thought about 1000 were built; recent research has increased this estimate and it is now believed there may have been closer to 2000.

=== Norway ===
Norwegian stave churches older than the 1100s are known only from written sources or from archaeological excavations, but written sources are sparse and difficult to interpret. Only 271 masonry churches were constructed in Norway during the same period, of which 160 still exist, while in Sweden and Denmark there were 900 and 1800 masonry churches respectively. Frostathing Law and Gulating law rules about "corner posts" show that the stave church was the standard church building in Norway, even though the Catholic church preferred stone. All wooden churches in Norway before the reformation were constructed with staves. Log building is younger than stave building in Norway, and was introduced in residential buildings around year 1000. Stave building is not influenced by the log technique. Only 29 stave churches have survived in Norway. Most of these were built between 1150 and 1350.

The word "stave church" is unknown in Old Norse, presumably because there were no other types of wooden churches. When Norway's churches after the Reformation were constructed from logs, there was a need for a separate term for the older churches. In written sources from the Middle Ages, there is a clear distinction between stafr (posts) and þili or vægþili (wall boards). However, in documents from the 1600–1700s, "stave" was also used for wall boards or panels. Emil Eckhoff in his Svenska stavkyrkor (1914–1916) also included wood-frame church buildings without posts.

According to Norway's oldest written laws and Old Norwegian Homily Book, the consecration of the church was valid as long as the four corner posts were standing. One of the sermons in the old homily book is known as the "stave church sermon". The sermon dates from around 1100 and was presumably performed at consecrations, or on their anniversaries. The sermon text is a theological interpretation of the building elements in the church. It names most of the building elements in the stave church, and can be a source of terminology and technique. For instance, the sermon says: "The four corner posts of the church are a symbol for the four gospels, because their teachings are the strongest supports within the whole of Christianity."

Church building was mentioned in the Gulatingsloven (Gulating Law), which was written down in the 1000s. In the chapter on Christianity, the 12th article states:

If one man builds a church, either lendmann does it or a farmer, or whoever builds a church, shall keep the church and the plot in good condition. But if the church breaks down and corner posts fall, then he shall bring timber to the plot before twelve months; if not, he will pay three marks in punishment to the bishop and bring timber and rebuild the church anyway.
(Um einskildmenn byggjer kyrkje, anten lendmann gjer det eller bonde, eller kven det er som byggjer kyrkje, skal han halda henne i stand og inkje øyda tufti. Men um kyrkja brotnar og hyrnestavane fell, då skal han føra timber på tufti innan tolv månadar; um det ikkje kjem, skal han bøta tre merker for det til biskopen og koma med timber og byggja opp kyrkja likevel.)

In Norway, stave churches were gradually replaced; many survived until the 19th century when a substantial number were destroyed. Today, 28 historical stave churches remain standing in Norway. Stave churches were particularly common in less populated areas in high valleys and forest land, and in fishermen's villages on islands and minor villages along fjords. By about 1800, 322 stave churches were still known in Norway, most of them in sparsely populated areas. If the main church was masonry, the annex church could be a stave church. Masonry churches were mostly built in towns, along the coast, and in rich agricultural areas in Trøndelag and eastern Norway, as well as in the larger parishes in fjord districts in western Norway. No new churches were built in Norway during the 1400s and 1500s. Norway's stave churches largely disappeared until 1700 and were replaced by log buildings. Several stave churches were redesigned or enlarged using different techniques during 1600–1700; for instance, Flesberg Stave Church was converted into a cruciform church partly in log construction. According to Dietrichson, most stave churches were dismantled to make room for a new church, partly because the old church had become too small for the congregation, and partly because the stave church was in poor condition. Fire, storm, avalanche and decay were other reasons. In 1650 there were about 270 stave churches left in Norway, and in the next hundred years 136 of these disappeared. There were still 95 stave churches in 1800, while over 200 former stave churches were still known by name or in written sources. From 1850 to 1885, 32 stave churches disappeared; since then only the Fantoft Stave Church has been lost.

Heddal stave church was the first stave church described in a scholarly publication, when Johannes Flintoe wrote an essay in Samlinger til det Norske Folks Sprog og Historie (Christiania, 1834). The book also printed Flintoe's drawings of the facade, the ground floor and the floor plan – the first known architectural drawing of a stave church.

Between 1950 and 1970, postholes from older buildings were discovered under Lom stave church as well as under masonry churches such as Kinsarvik Church, and this discovery was an important contribution to understanding the origin of stave churches. Postholes were first identified during excavations in Urnes stave church.

=== Other countries ===
The number of stave churches constructed in Iceland and the rest of Europe is unknown. Some believe they were the first type of church to be constructed in Scandinavia; however, the post churches are an older type, although the difference between the two is slight. A stave church has a lower construction set on a frame, whereas a post church has earth-bound posts.

In Sweden, the stave churches were considered obsolete in the Middle Ages and were replaced. In Denmark, traces of post churches have been found at several locations, and there are also parts still in existence from some of them. A plank of one such church was found in Jutland. The plank is now on display at the National Museum of Denmark in Copenhagen and an attempt at reconstructing the church is a featured display at the Moesgård Museum near Aarhus. Marks created by several old post churches have also been found at the old stone church in Jelling.

In Sweden, the medieval Hedared Stave Church was constructed c. 1500 at the same location as a previous stave church. Other notable places are Maria Minor church in Lund, with its traces of a post church with palisades, and some old parts of Hemse Stave Church on Gotland. In Skåne alone there were around 300 such churches when Adam of Bremen visited Denmark in the first half of the 11th century, but how many of those were stave churches or post churches is unknown.

In England, there is one similar church of Saxon origin, with much debate as to whether it is a stave church or predates them. This is the Greensted Church in Essex. General consensus categorizes it as Saxon Type A. Another church bears similarities to stave churches, the medieval stone church of St. Mary in Kilpeck in Herefordshire. It features a number of dragon heads.

In Germany, there is one stone church with a motif depicting a dragon similar to those often seen on Norwegian stave churches and on surviving artifacts from Denmark and Gotland. Whether this decoration can be attributed to cultural similarities or whether it indicates similar construction methods in Germany has sparked controversy.

Replica stave churches have been built in several American communities, mostly in the Upper Midwest, with Norwegian or Icelandic immigrant populations.

=== Influences ===
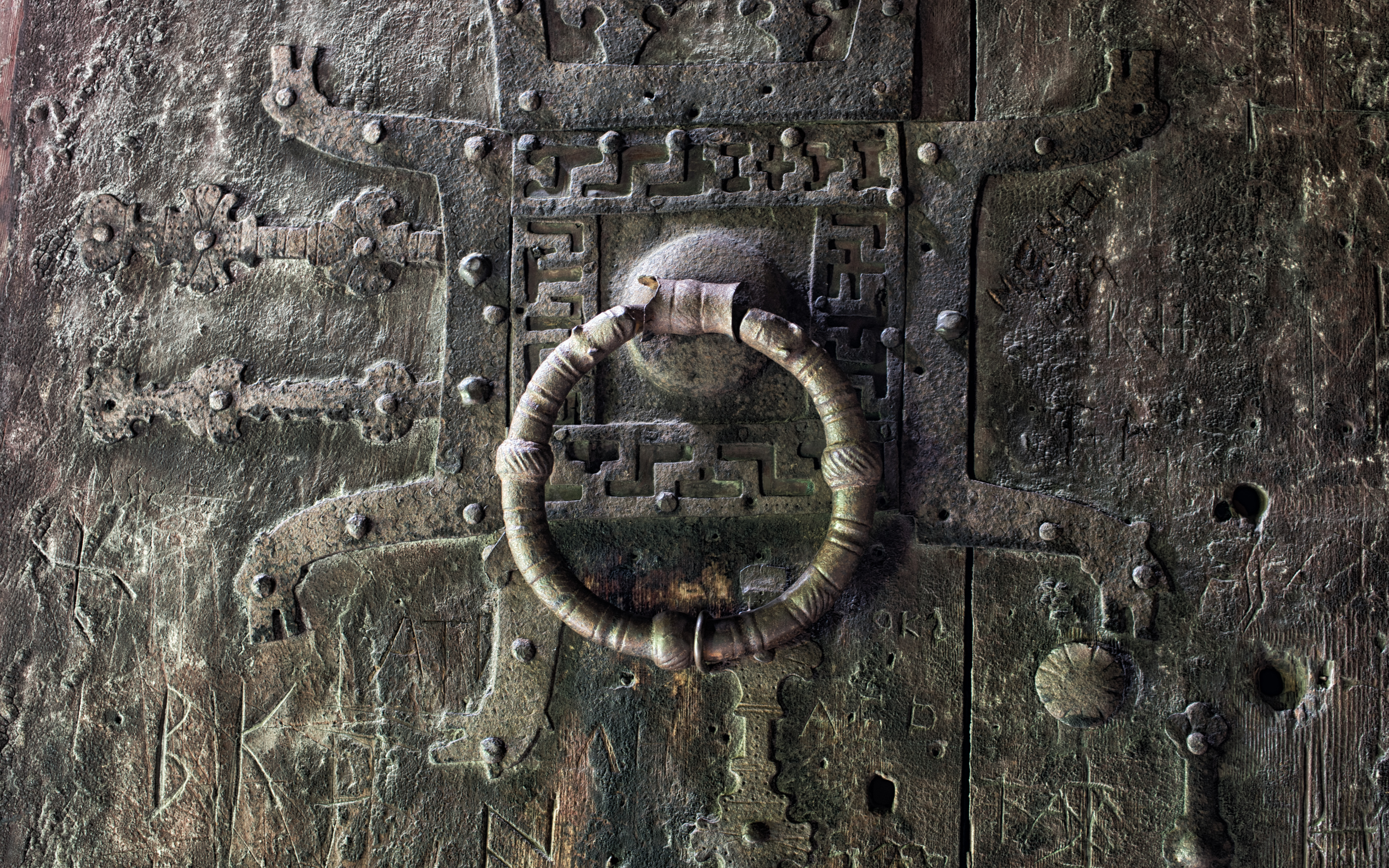
Details of Borgund Stave Church

Lorentz Dietrichson in his book De norske Stavkirker ("The Norwegian Stave Churches") (1892) claimed that the stave church is "a brilliant translation of the Romanesque basilica from stone to wood" ("En genial oversettelse fra sten til tre av den romanske basilika"). Dietrichson claimed that Type B displays an influence from early Christian and Roman basilicas. The style was assumed to be transferred via Anglo-Saxon and Irish architecture, where only the particular roof construction was local. Dietrichson emphasized the clerestory, arcades and capitals. The "basilica theory" was introduced by N. Nicolaysen in Mindesmærker af Middelalderens Kunst i Norge (1854). Nicolaysen wrote: "Our stave churches are now the only remaining of its kind, and according to the sparse records and known circumstances, it appears that nothing similar existed except perhaps in Britain and Ireland." ("Vore stavkirker er nu de eneste i sit slags, og saavidt sparsomme beretninger og andre omstændigheder lader formode, synes de heller ikke tidligere at have havt noget sidestykke med undtagelse af maaske i Storbritannien og Irland.") Nicolaysen further claimed that the layout and design may have been inspired by Byzantine architecture. Nicolaysen wrote: "All facts suggest that the stave churches like the masonry churches and all medieval architecture in Western Europe originated from the Roman basilica." ("Alt synes at henpege paa, at forbilledet til vore stavkirker ligesom til stenkirkerne og overhovedet til hele den vesteuropæiske arkitektur i middelalderen er udgaaet fra den romerske basilika.") This theory was further developed by Anders Bugge and Roar Hauglid. Peter Anker believed that the influence from foreign masonry architecture was primarily in decorative details.

Per Jonas Nordhagen does not reject the basilica theory, but suggests development along two paths and that the basilical was a development towards larger and technically more sophisticated churches. The main, progressive path according to Nordhagen lead to Torpo and Borgund.

Folklore and circumstantial evidence seem to suggest that stave churches were built upon old indigenous Norse worship sites, the hof. Dietrichson believed that the stave churches were closely connected to the hof and the "hof theory" attracted interest in the 1930s and 1940s. The theory assumed that the hofs had a square, raised roof supported by four columns. During Christianization of Norway local chiefs were forced to either dismantle the hofs or to convert hofs into churches. Bugge and Norberg-Schultz accordingly claimed that "there is no reason to believe that the last hofs and the first churches had any major differences" ("og da er det liten grunn til å tro at de siste hov har skilt seg synderlig fra de første kirker"). This assumption has been rejected by archeological evidence several times, in the case of Iceland by Åge Roussel. Olaf Olsen described the hof merely as function related to ordinary buildings on major farms. If the hof was a particular building they remain to be identified, according to Olsen. Olsen rejected the hof theory. Nicolay Nicolaysen also concluded that there is not a single known case of a hof that was converted to a church.

Lack of historical evidence for hofs as buildings undermines the hof theory. Nicolaysen also introduced the community centre hypothesis which argued that hofs were destroyed and churches constructed on the same convenient location for the local community. Location near a previous hof would then be a coincidence, according to Nicolaysen. Pope Gregory I encouraged (year 601) Augustine of Canterbury to reuse pre-Christian temples, but this had little relevance for Norway according to Nicolaysen. Jan Brendalsmo in his dissertation concluded that churches were often established on major farms or farms of local chiefs and close to feasting halls or graveyards.

Stave churches sometimes appear to have built upon or used materials from old pagan worship sites and are considered to be the best evidence for the existence of Norse Pagan temples and the best guide as to what they looked like. The layout of the churches is believed to have mimicked old Pagan temples in design and was possibly designed in order to adhere to old Norse cosmological beliefs, especially as some churches were built around a central point like a world tree. Stave churches were also often located near or in the sight of large natural formations which also had a significant role in Norse Paganism, thus also suggesting a form of continuity through placement and symbolism. Furthermore, dragons' heads and other clear mythological symbolism suggests the cultural blending of Norse mythological beliefs and Christianity in a non-contradictory synthesis. Owing to this evidence newer research has suggested that Christianity was introduced into Norway much earlier than was previously assumed.

=== Church arsons and attempts ===
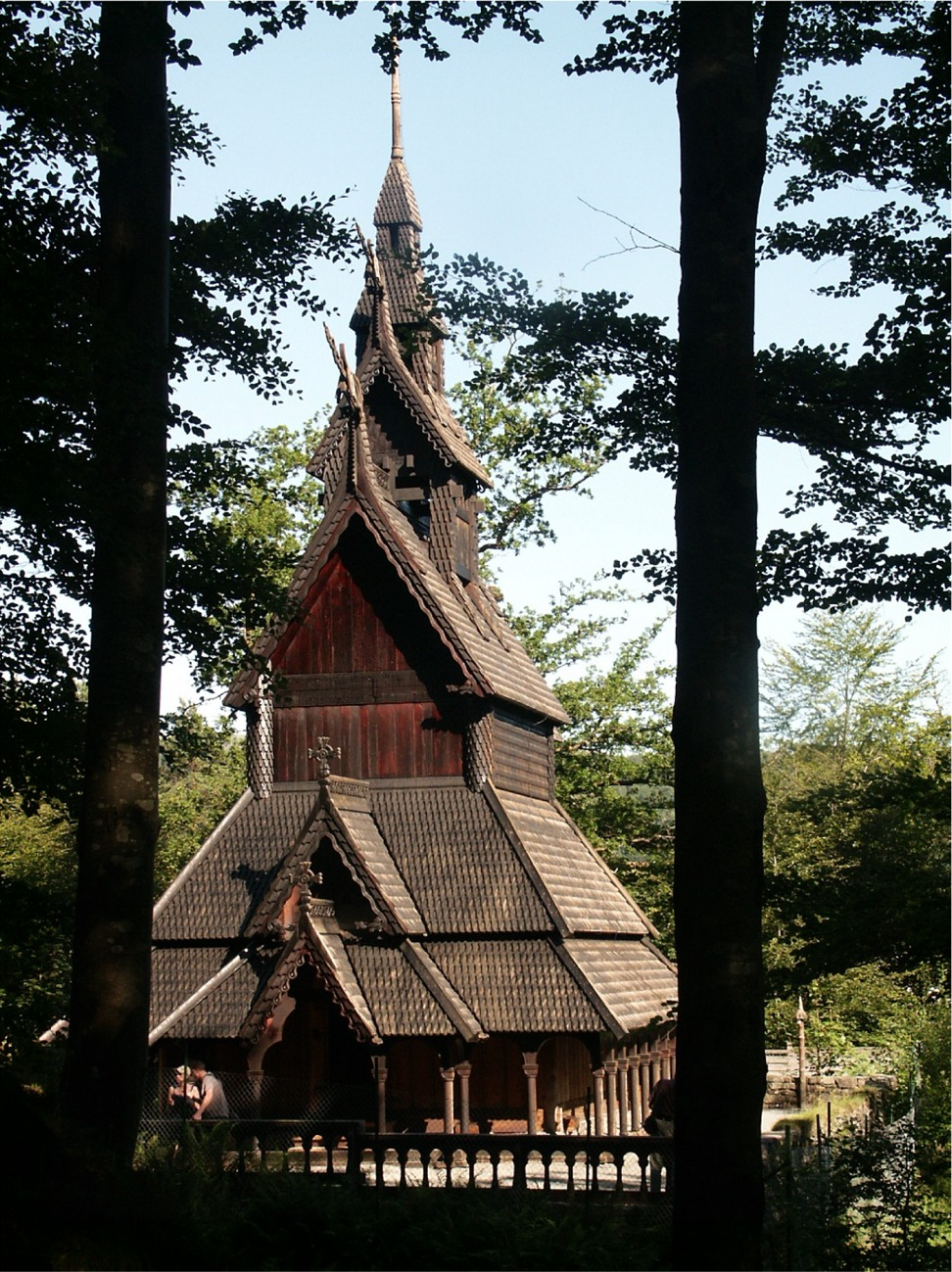
The Fantoft Stave Church, restored in 1997.

While church fires of wooden churches in Norway are relatively common, due to wood's flammable nature, from 1992 to 1995, the number rose dramatically. Between 1992 and 1996, there were at least 50 attacks on Christian churches in Norway, some of which were Stave churches. Members of the Norwegian black metal scene are thought to be largely responsible; in every arson case that was solved, those responsible were black metal fans.

The first church burned was Norway's Fantoft Stave Church, which was burnt to the ground in June 1992. Police believe Varg Vikernes of the metal band Burzum was responsible, and the cover of Burzum's EP Aske ("ashes") is a photograph of the destroyed church. On 16 May 1994, Vikernes was found guilty for burning down the Holmenkollen Chapel, Skjold Church, and Åsane Church. Those convicted for church burnings showed no remorse and described their actions as a symbolic "retaliation" against Christianity in Norway. Vikernes would come to be seen as "the perpetrator of a few and inspiration for many of the fires".

The following is a partial list of the church arsons:

1992

- 23 May: attempted burning of Storetveit Church in Bergen Municipality.
- 6 June: burning of Fantoft stave church in Bergen – Varg Vikernes is strongly suspected as the culprit, but was not convicted.
- 1 August: burning of Revheim Church in Stavanger Municipality.
- 21 August: burning of Holmenkollen Chapel in Oslo Municipality – Varg Vikernes and Faust were convicted for this; Euronymous also participated, but was murdered in August 1993.
- 1 September: burning of Ormøya Church in Oslo Municipality.
- 13 September: burning of Skjold Church in Vindafjord Municipality – Varg Vikernes and Samoth were convicted for this.
- 3 October: burning of Hauketo Church in Oslo Municipality.
- 24 December: burning of Åsane Church in Bergen Municipality – Varg Vikernes and Jørn Inge Tunsberg were convicted for this.
- 25 December: burning of a Methodist church in Sarpsborg Municipality – a firefighter was killed while fighting this fire.

1993

- 7 February: burning of Lundby New Church in Gothenburg, Sweden.

1994

- 13 March: burning of Sund Church in Sund.
- 27 March: burning of Seegård Church in Gjøvik Municipality.
- 16 May: attempted burning of Gol stave church Gol Municipality in Buskerud.
- 17 May: attempted burning of Åmodt Chapel in Buskerud.
- 4 June: burning of Frogn Church in Drøbak in Frogn Municipality.
- 19 June: attempted burning of Heni Church in Gjerdrum Municipality.
- 7 July: burning of a church in Jeløy.
- 21 July: attempted burning of Odda Church in Odda Municipality.
- 13 August: attempted burning of Loop Chapel in Meldal Municipality.
- 10 December: attempted burning of Åkra Church in Karmøy Municipality.
- 22 December: attempted burning of Askim Church in Askim Municipality.
- 26 December: attempted burning of Klemetsrud Church in Oslo Municipality.

1995

- 13 May: burning of Lord Church in Telemark.
- 25 May: burning of Såner Church in Vestby Municipality.
- 14 June: burning of Moe Church in Sandefjord Municipality.
- 21 July: attempted burning of a church college in Eidanger in Porsgrunn Municipality.
- 3 September: attempted burning of Vågsbygd Church college in Kristiansand Municipality.
- 3 November: burning of Innset Church in Rennebu Municipality.

== Architecture and decoration ==
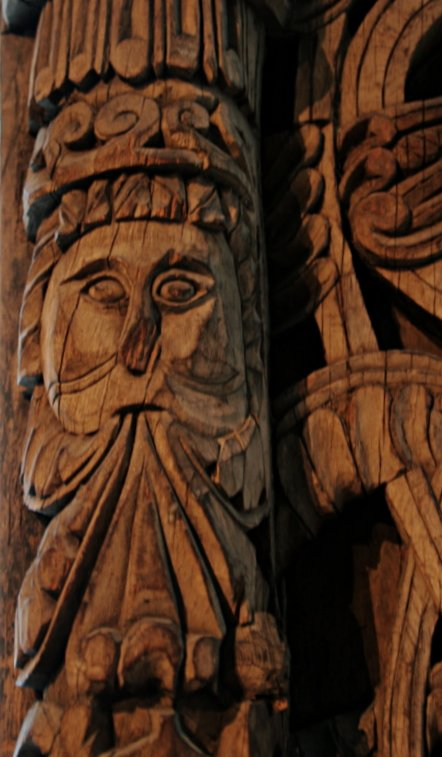
Portal detail from Tønjum Stave Church

Even though the wooden churches had structural differences, they give a recognizable general impression. Formal differences may hide common features of their planning, while apparently similar buildings may turn out to have their structural elements organized completely differently. Despite this, certain basic principles must have been common to all types of building.

Basic geometrical figures, numbers that were easy to work with, one or just a few length units and simple ratios, and perhaps proportions, were among the theoretical aids all builders inherited. The specialist was the man who knew a particular type of building so well that he could systematise its elements in a slightly different way from previous building designs, thus carrying developments a stage further.

"Exposing the timber frame on the interior and/or exterior of the structures is seen to release its matrix of timber members and its capacity to contribute architectural expression to buildings. The matrix, forming ‘lines’ in space, has an expressive potential that includes the capacity to delineate proportion, direct eye-movement, suggest spatial enclosure, create patterning, permit transparency and establish continuity with landscape."

=== Portals ===
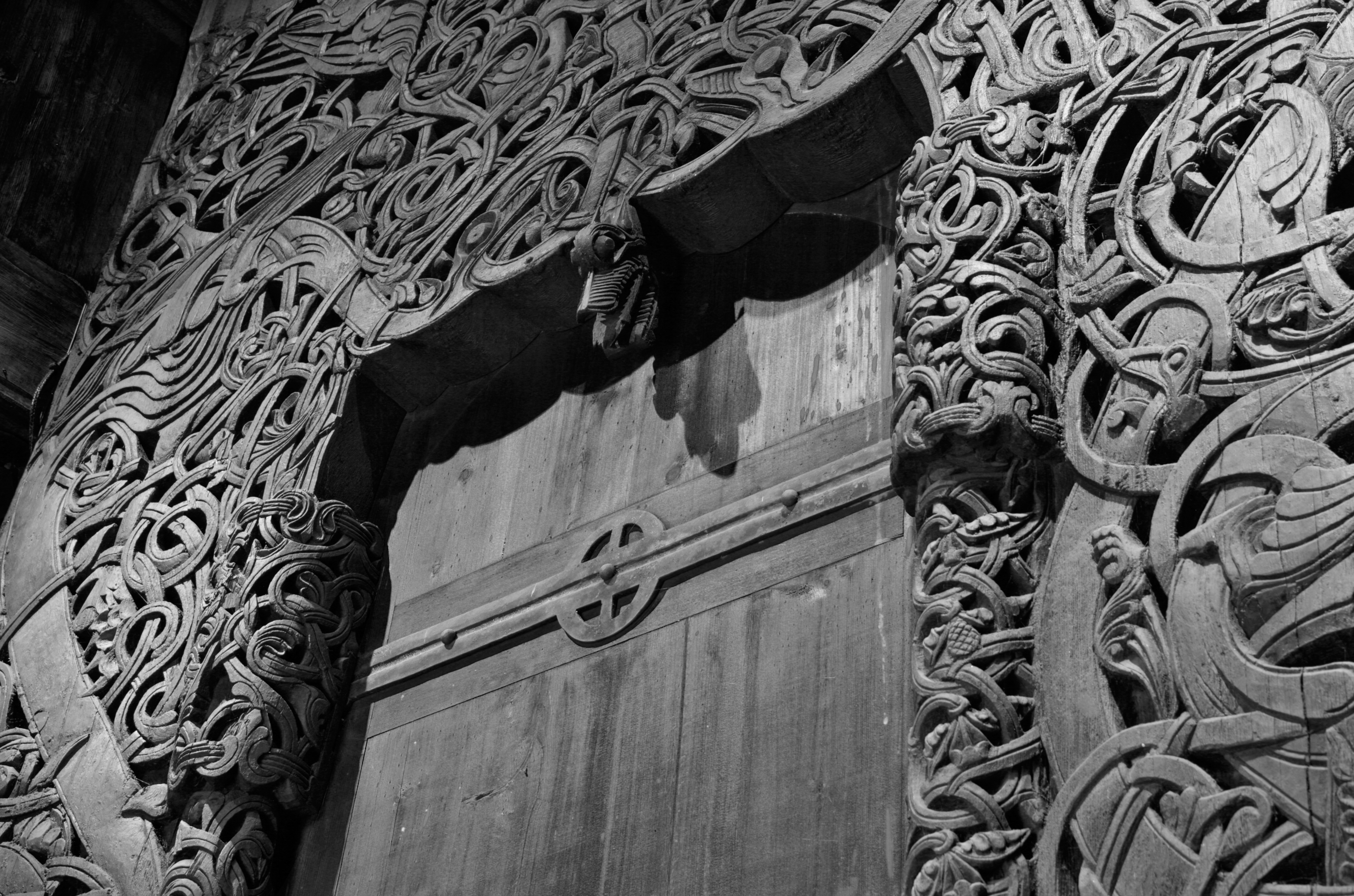
Main portal in Hedal stave church

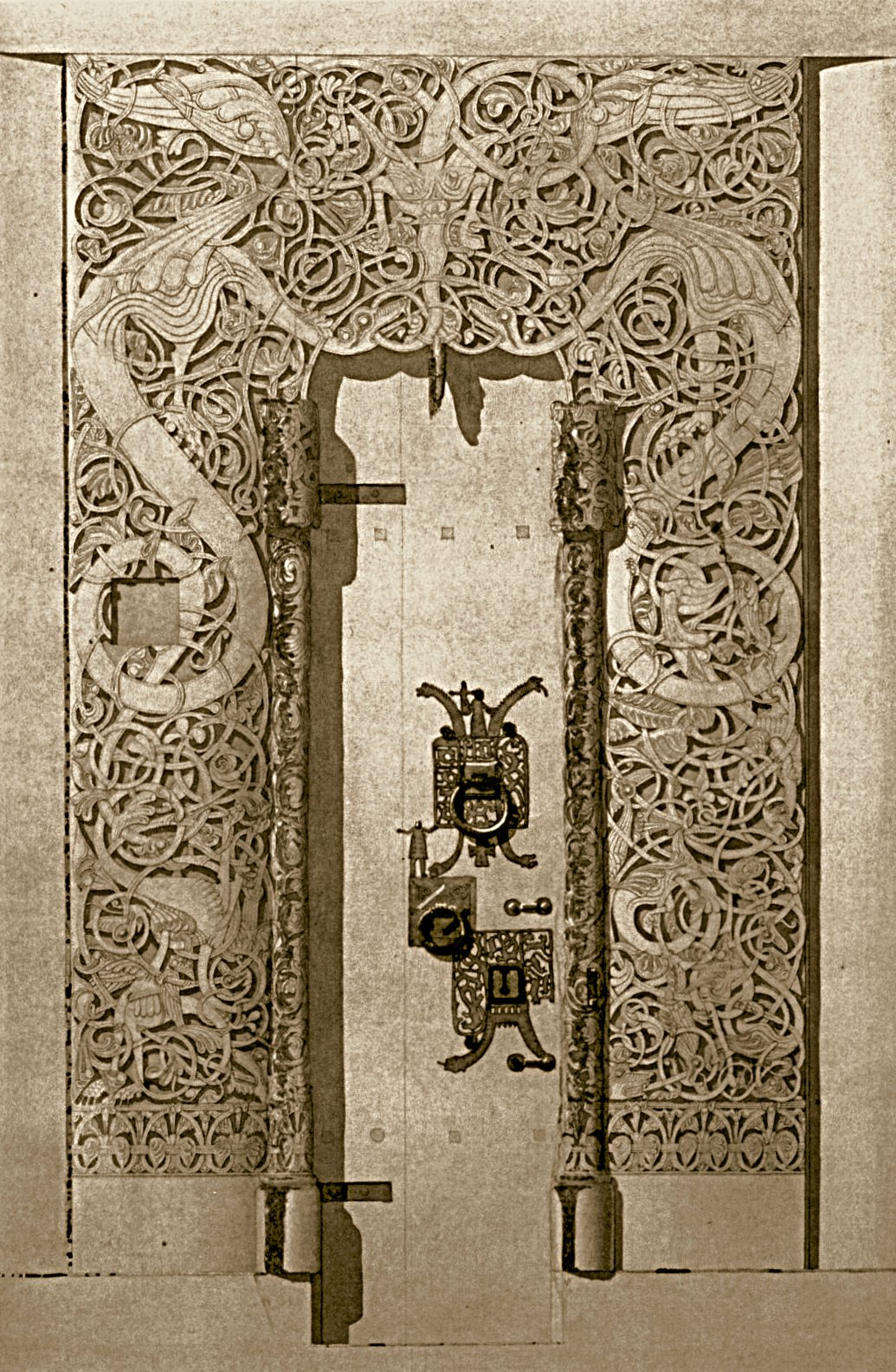
Drawing by G. A. Bull of the main portal in Hedal stave church, from c.1853

Portals or parts of the portals from about 140 stave churches have been preserved. There are roughly three portal types: the simple profile portal, the column portal and the beam portal.

The simple profile portal is a doorway framed by simple profiles or pilasters. These portals are mostly used on cord doors. About 20 such doors have been preserved.

The column portal is derived from stone architecture. It has full or half columns that carry a curved archivolt. The columns have bases and chapters. They are richly decorated and were used both on front doors and inside cross-sections. About 40 such portals are known.

The beam (or magnificent) portal consists of two portal planks and a top piece with continuous decoration. The upper part has two to five horizontal planks that are folded into each other with tongue and groove. This is supported by the standing wall planks that flank the doorway. 75 more or less complete portals of this type have been preserved. In some beam portals, the column motif is also incorporated together with the surface decorations, with or without archivolt.

Most of the preserved material comes from Sogn-Hardanger and from the mountain villages in eastern Norway. The main part of the portals is Romanesque and lacks Gothic features.

It is possible that the portals may have been painted, but this has been difficult to determine with certainty. The paint on the few that are painted today seems to be newer.

It is common to divide the portals according to style to Urnes style and Romanesque style.

=== Iconography ===
Most portals show dragons, "lions" and vines that do not refer to specific biblical or other Christian stories. One of the exceptions is the Christian motifs found on the west portal from the torn Hemsedal stave church, which shows St. Olav's martyrdom and status as a Christlike saint.

A research problem has been the portal's iconography. As for the Urnes style portals, the idea that it should have a pagan content is rejected. The large animal has been interpreted as a lion. The lion can represent Christ who fights with and wins over evil.

Common features of most portals are that they are monumental and that they have fighting dragons, which may be symbolic of magic to avert pain. Bugge believes that this may be a pagan iconography in Christian interpretation. In the Sogn-Valdres portals the lion is replaced by a vine, which also represents Christianity. in reference to Joh. 15.5: "I am the vine, you are the branches." Hohler opposes this interpretation. She believes that the portals cannot have a religious content, but is a picture of the client's or builder's intention, a ruling motif. There are many portals in Europe that are pure ornaments. She refers to Bernhard of Clairvaux, who opposed the use of animals in the Christian context.

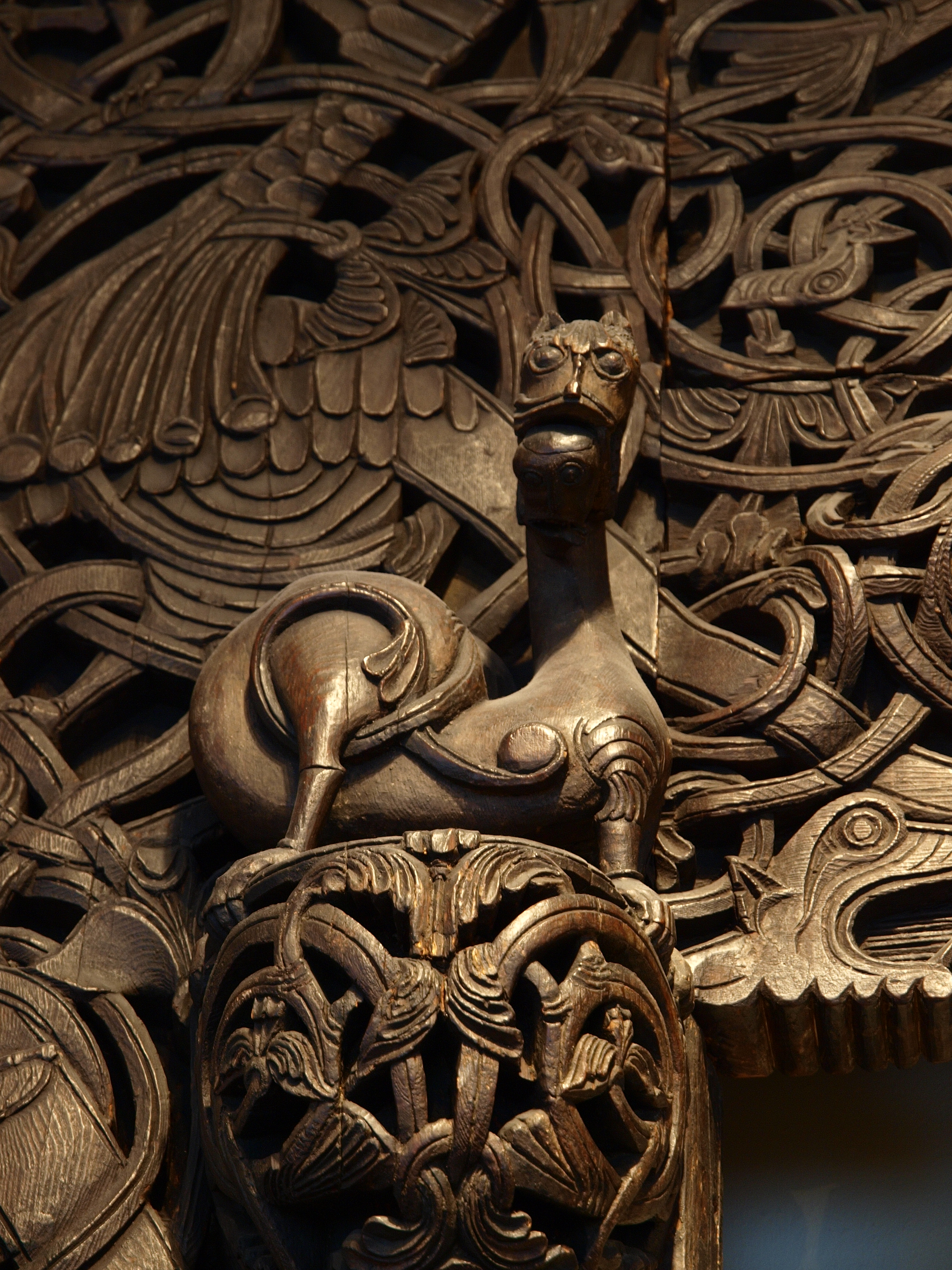
Lion on the door, Historisk museum, Oslo

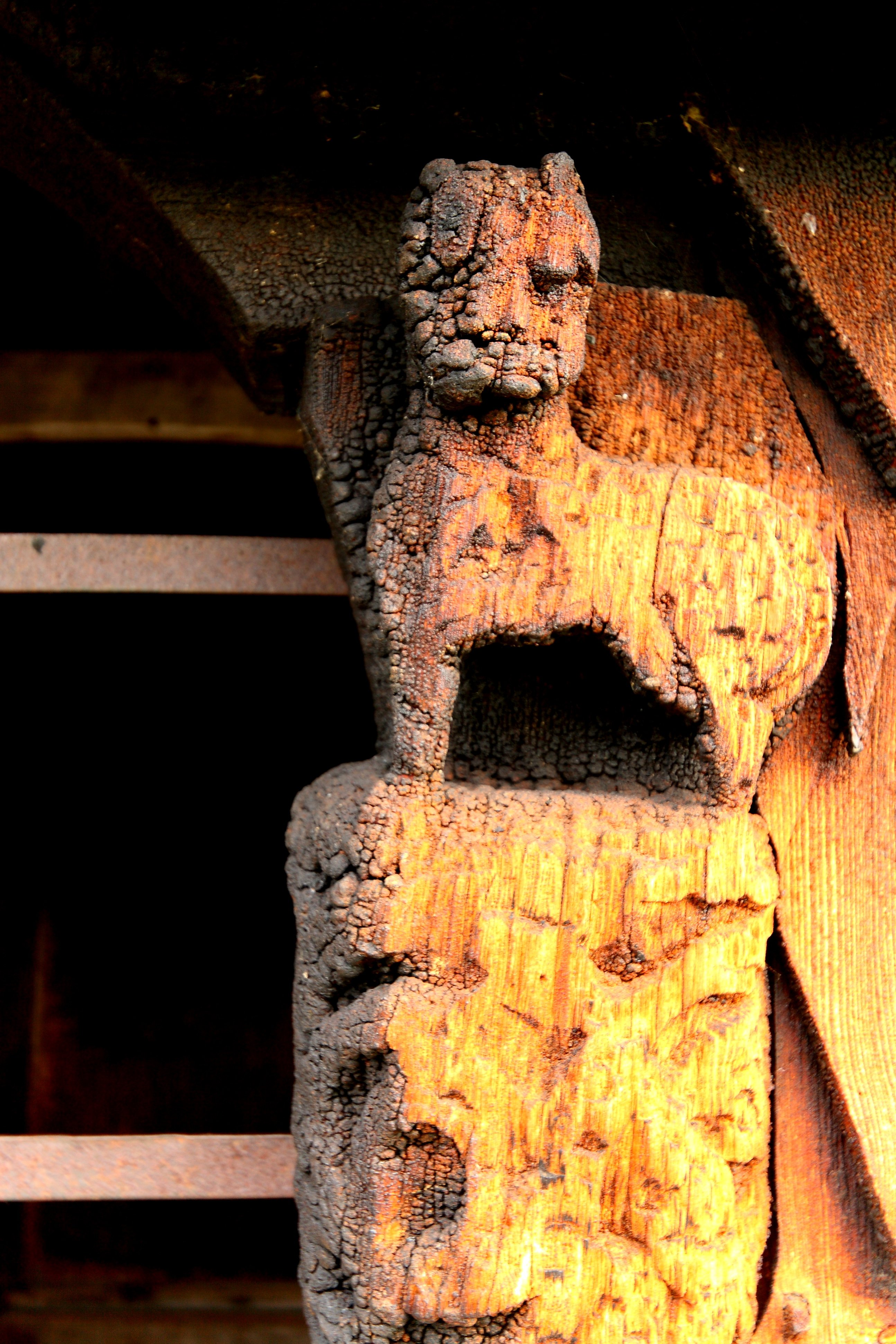
Lion from the portal of Eidsborg Stave Church.

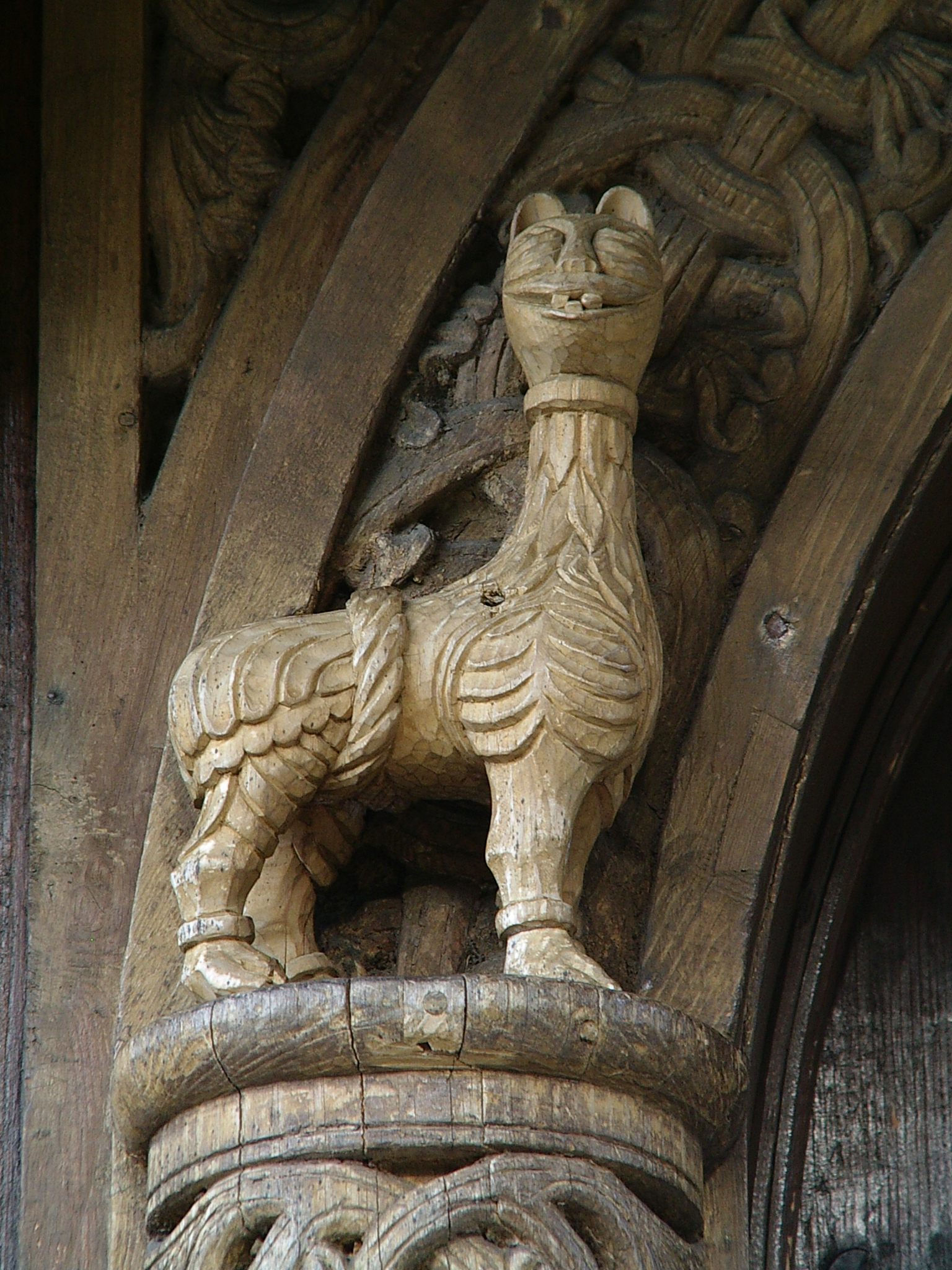
Lion from the Vang Stave Church

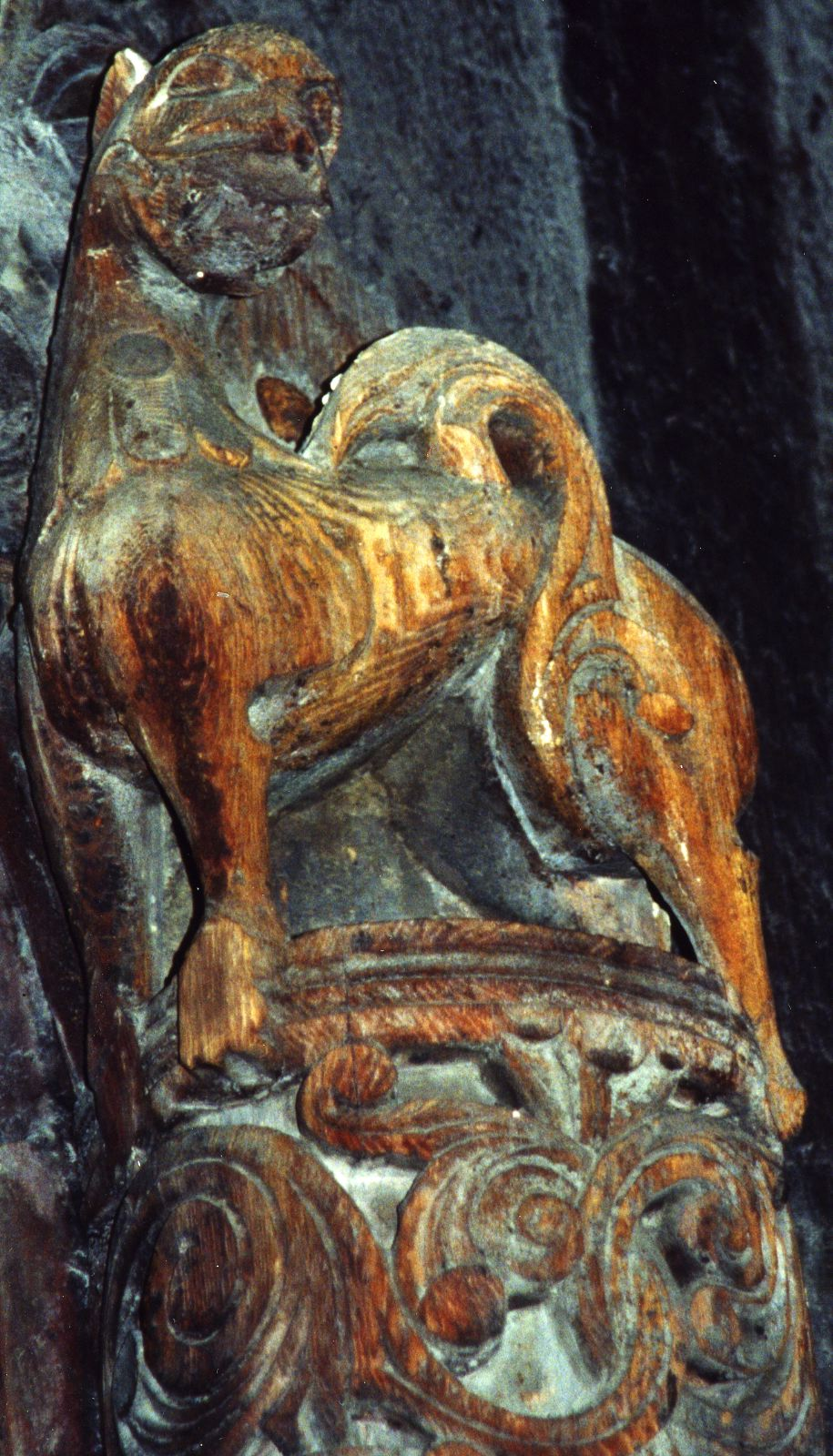
Lion on arch decoration from Borgund Stave Church

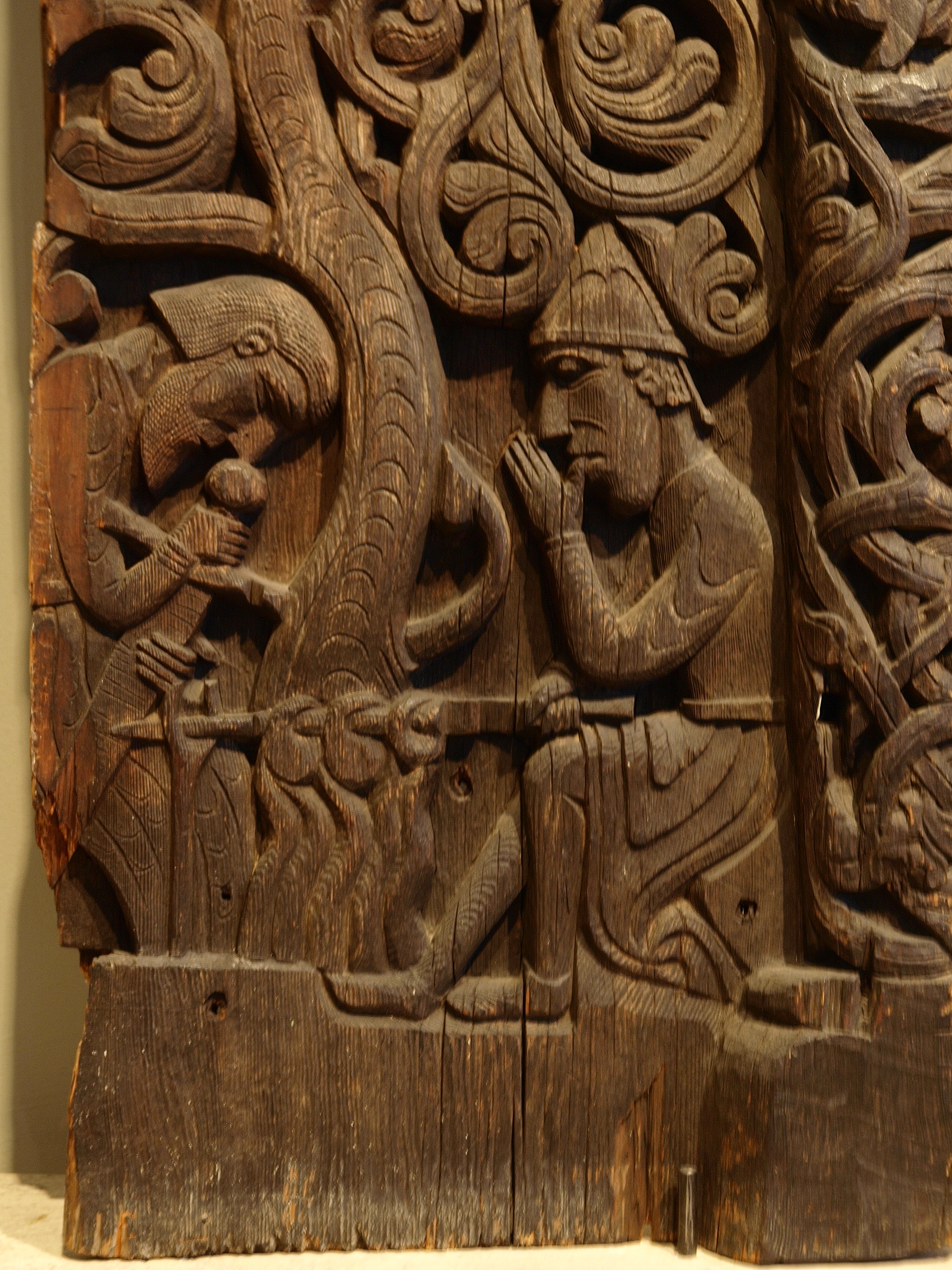
Sigurd sucking the dragon blood off his thumb, engravings from Hylestad Stave Church

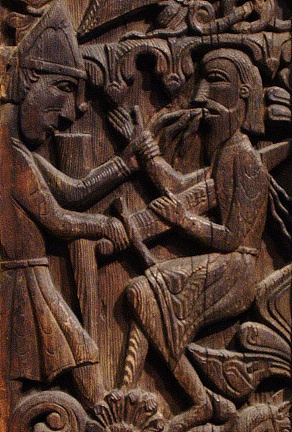
The slaying of Regin, engravings from Hylestad Stave Church

What justification do the beasts of the monastery have for the formless treasure of form and the formless formlessness? What do pictures there have to do with unclean monkeys, wild lions, amazing centaurs and half-humans? Why serve tigers, fighting knights, hunters who blow their horns? There you see under a head several bodies, and there you see on a four-legged body a snake's tail, there on a fish an animal head – Everywhere there is such a rich and fantastic collection of different shapes that one directs one's eyes to the sculptures rather than the content of the holy books.

She therefore believes that animal motifs in Romanesque art have little religious significance, and the portals can be pure ruler symbols.

Hoftun believes that many of the so-called pagan portal motifs have a clear Christian message, believing that in principle the Norwegian stave church motifs do not differ from many of the motifs found in other Romanesque church art, such as on Romanesque church portals and stone baptismal fonts in Sweden and Denmark.

Other researchers believe that the portals are inspired by English art. The background may be manuscripts and stone sculpture. Some of these manuscripts are animal books with a Christian allegorical content, often referred to as bestiaries. The origin of these is the Physiologus, a collection of allegories about animals with Christian interpretations, which are said to have originated in Alexandria in the 2nd century. This basic text was in Greek, and throughout the Middle Ages the text was translated into a number of languages. These stories are also the background for all the bestiaries that are preserved in various libraries and collections. The sources of the Physiologus are Indian, Hebrew and Egyptian animal stories and various classical texts written by, among others, Aristotle and Pliny the Elder. No early Greek text has survived; the oldest preserved are in Latin, but these must be very close to the Greek original. Gradually, it became common to illustrate the texts, but there is a leap in development, and a number of texts with illustrations have been lost.

Lindkvist refers to the Physiologus as a background for animal depictions in portals on Gotland. These stone churches were often built after the stave churches in the same places had become too small. Unfortunately, most of the wooden churches have disappeared, so it is not possible to study the decor. But it is not unreasonable to assume that they have had the same decor as Norwegian stave churches, and that these motifs may then have been continued in the stone portals. Background and origin would then be approximately the same.

== Dating of churches ==
Stave churches can be dated in various ways: by historical records or inscriptions, by stylistic means using construction details or ornaments, or by dendrochronology and radiocarbon dating. Often historical records or inscriptions will point to a year when the church is known to have existed. Archaeological excavations can yield finds that provide relative dating for the structure, whereas absolute dating methods such as radiocarbon dating and dendrochronology can provide a more exact date. One drawback of dendrochronology is that it tends to overlook the possibility that the wood could have been reused from an older structure, or felled and left for many years before use.

An important problem in dating the churches is that the solid ground sills are the construction elements most likely to have the outer parts of the log still preserved. Yet they are the most susceptible to humidity, and as people back then reused building parts, the church may have been rebuilt several times. If so, a dendrochronological dating may be based upon a log from a later reconstruction.

Coin finds made under the church floors are also important for dating.

Results from studies with the photodendrome method published in 2019 have come with adjusted estimates for age of the timber used. The churches at Urnes, Kaupanger and Hopperstad were examined particularly thoroughly.

- Hoppestad Stave Church dendrodated to 1131–1132, previously assumed 1125–1250.
- Kaupanger Stave Church dated to 1137–1138, formerly adopted 1170–1200.
- Gol Stave Church 1204–05, previously assumed 1170–1309.
- Borgund Stave Church 1180–1181, previously assumed 1150–1250.
- Kvernes Stave Church, 1633, previously believed to be from the Middle Ages, is the only known stave church in Norway built after the Reformation.

== Stave Churches Program ==
The poor condition of the stave churches led the National Heritage Board to start the Stave Churches Program in 2001. The program was to create positive ripple effects in the form of greater local activity with traditional ways of using materials and resources.

The goals of the program were:

- to restore the stave churches so that they can be preserved for posterity,
- to preserve the decor and church art,
- to supplement the documentation of the stave churches as a basis for research and reconstruction of lost parts.

The results of the program with the details of what has been done at the individual churches was documented in a report in 2008.

== Gallery ==
Old and modern photos of the most iconic Norwegian stave churches

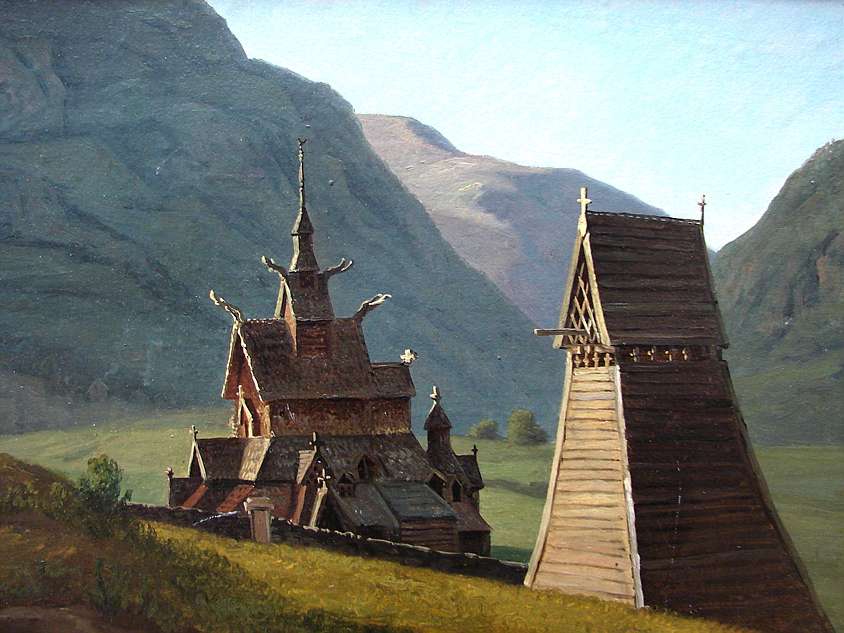
Borgund Stave Church, Martinus Rørbye, Ny Carlsberg Glyptotek, København, 1833

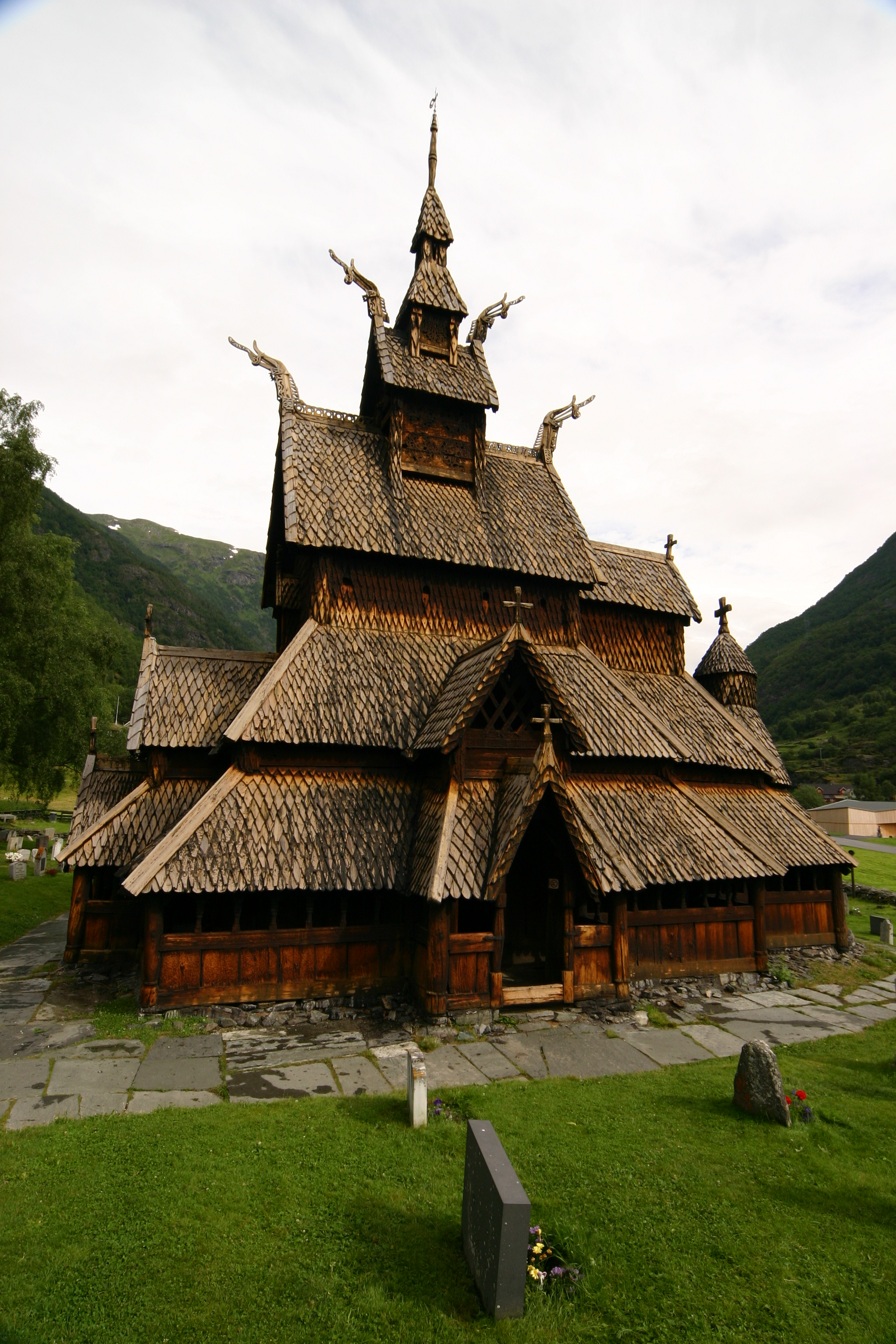
Borgund Stave Church, 2005

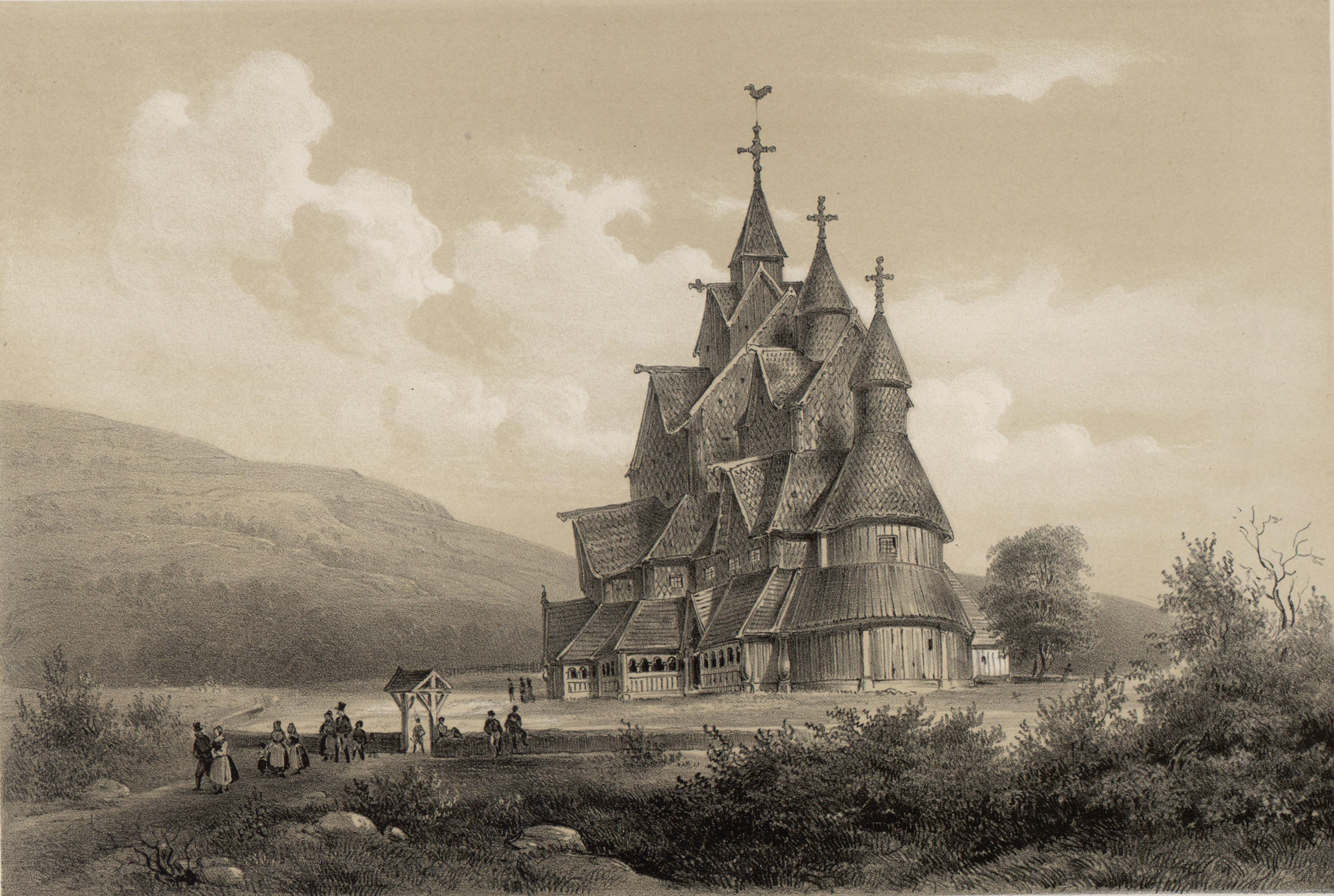
Heddal Stave Church. Illustration from the book Norge fremstillet i Tegninger, 1848

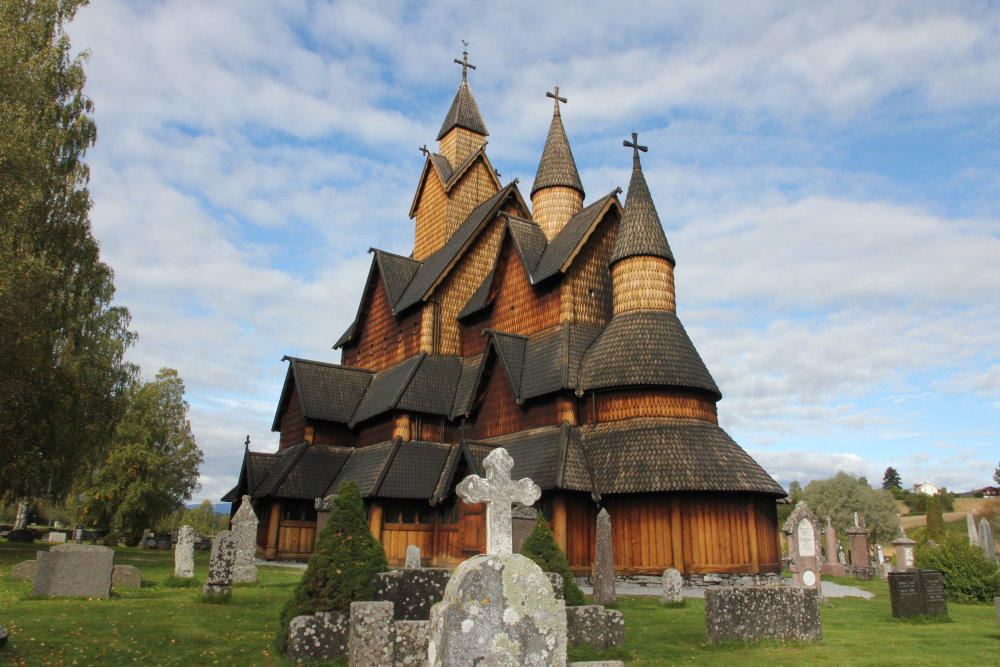
Heddal Stave Church, 2010

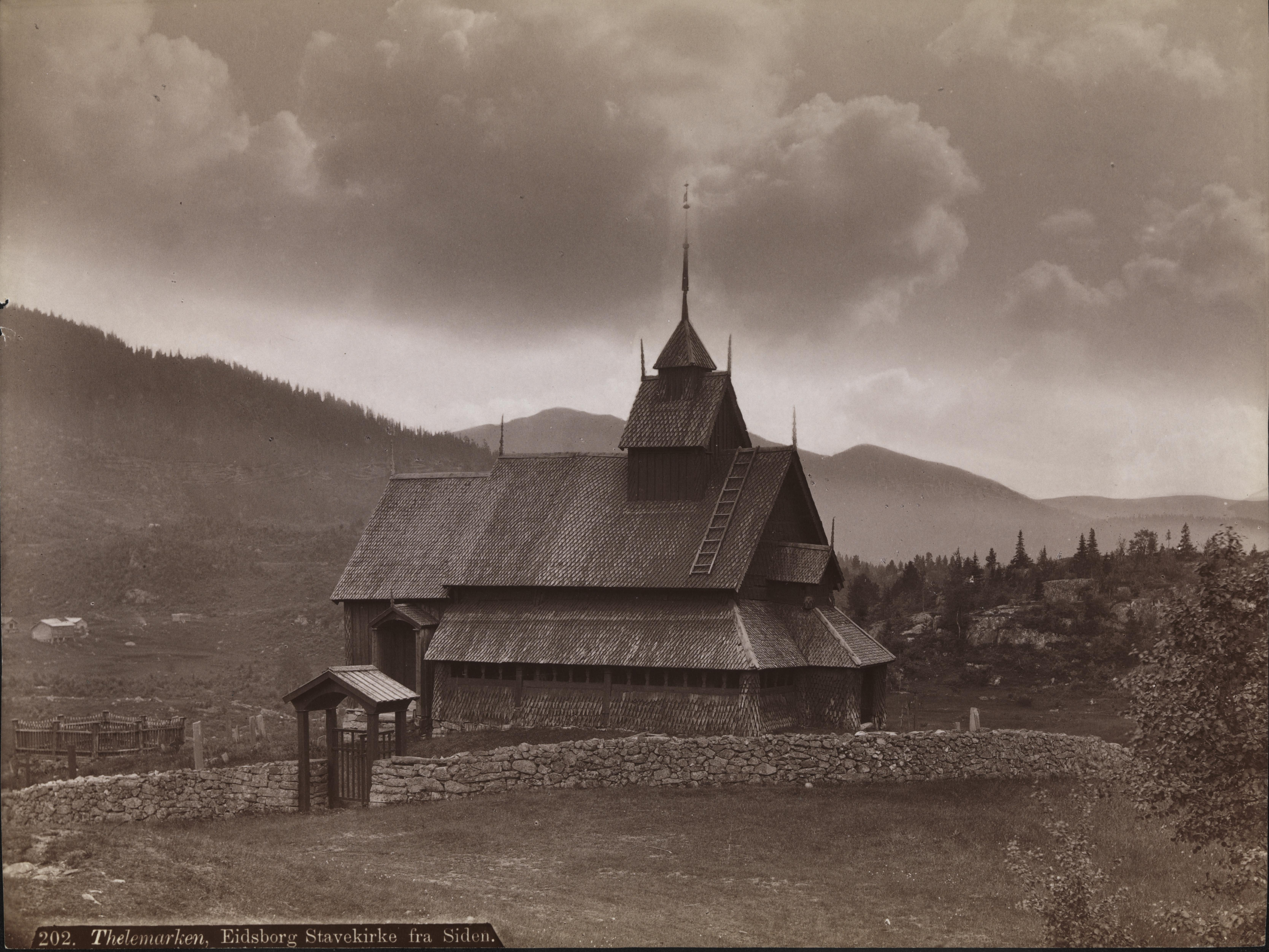
Eidsborg Stave Church, 1880–1890

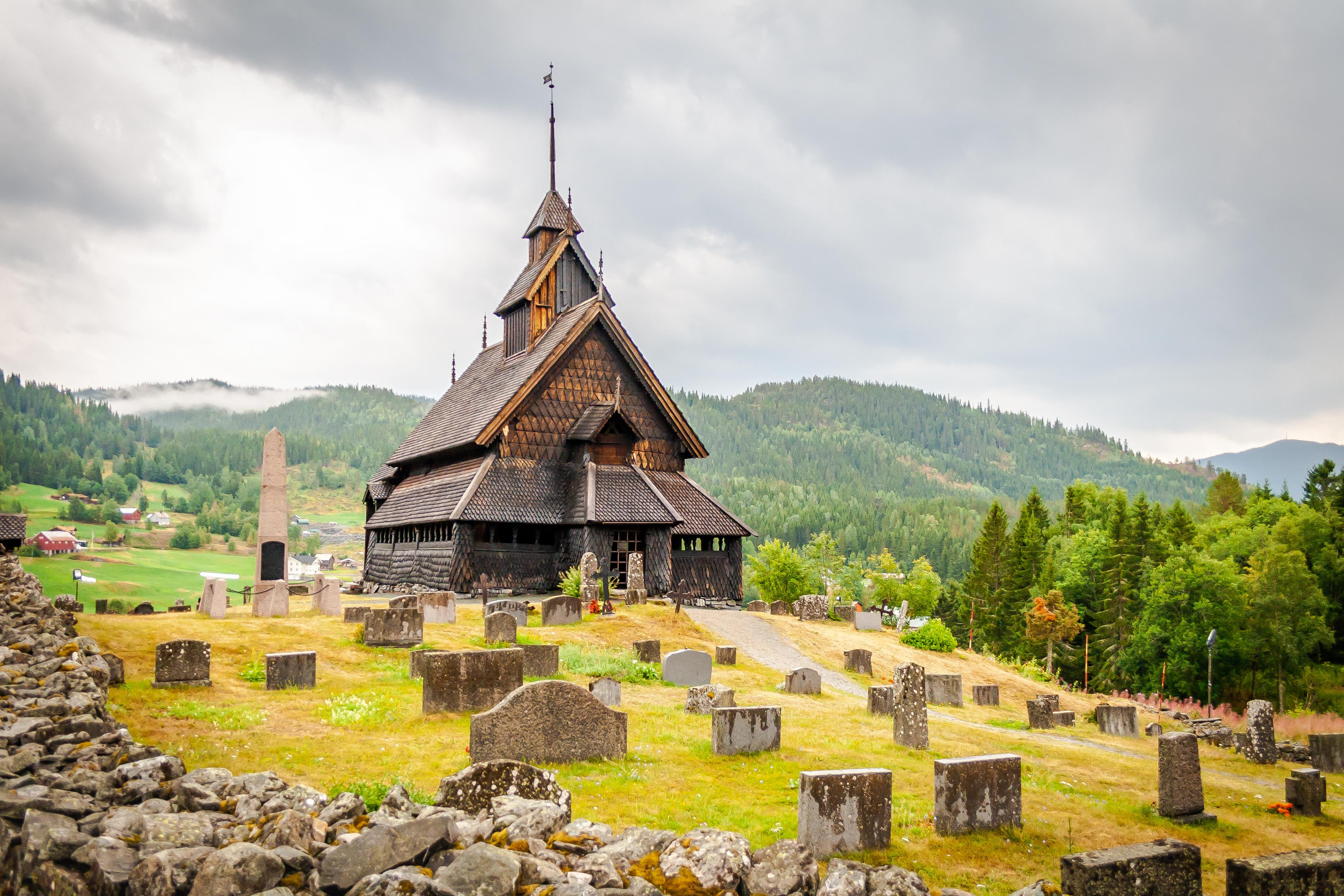
Eidsborg Stave Church, 2018

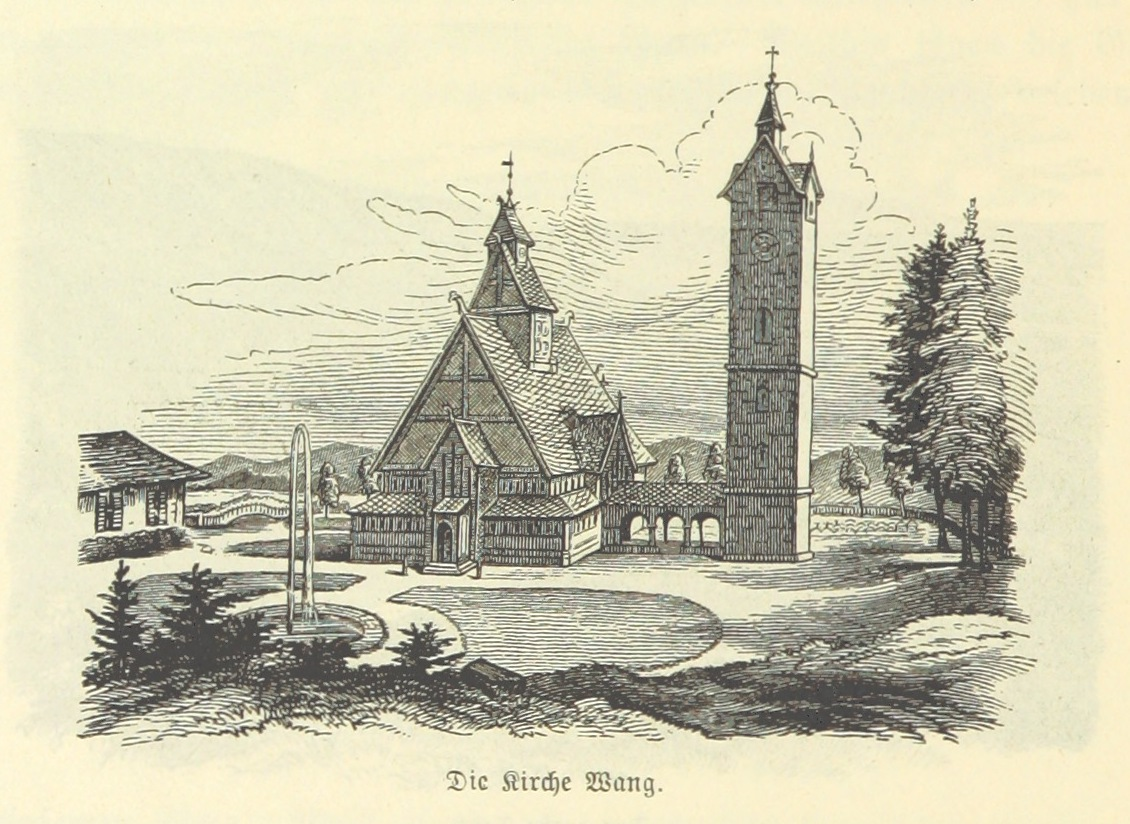
Vang Stave Church (Now in Poland) on a postcard, 1886

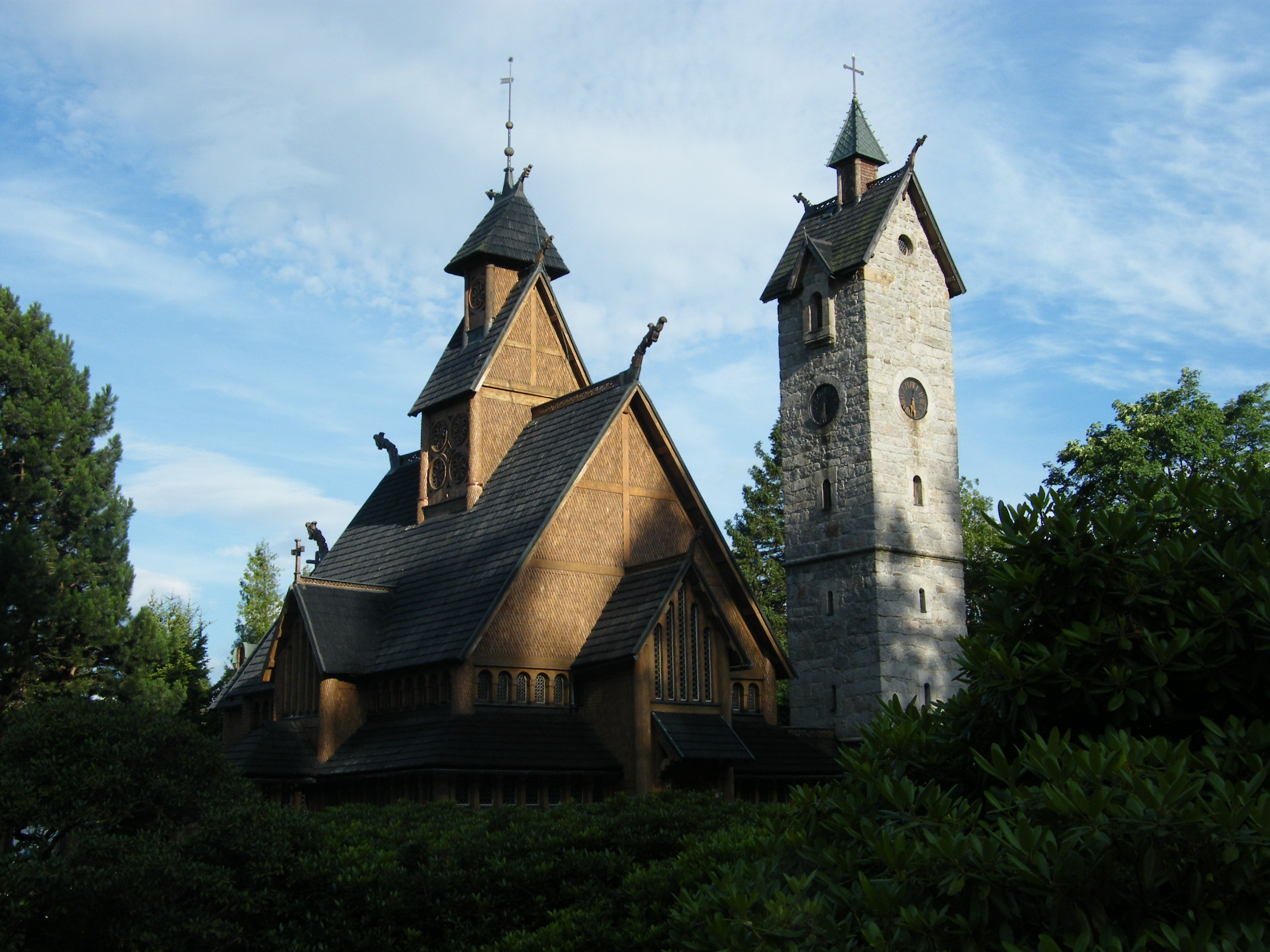
Vang Stave Church, 2012

== List of stave churches ==
Most stave churches are in Norway, but they can also be found in Iceland, Sweden, Denmark, and Germany. Stave churches are quite popular phenomenon and several have been built or rebuilt around the world. The two most copied are Borgund and Hedared, with some variations, and sometimes with adaptations to add elements from known stave churches from the area. In other places they are of a freer form and built for display.

=== Old stave churches ===
Map of well-preserved old stave churches in Norway

==== Norway ====
- Borgund Stave Church, in Lærdal Municipality, Vestland – end of the 12th century.
- Eidsborg Stave Church, in Tokke Municipality, Telemark – middle of the 13th century.
- Flesberg Stave Church in Flesberg Municipality, Buskerud – c. 1200.
- Garmo Stave Church, in Lillehammer Municipality, Innlandet – c. 1150.
- Gol Stave Church, in Gol Municipality (now at Norwegian Museum of Cultural History in Oslo), Buskerud – 1212.
- Grip Stave Church, in Kristiansund Municipality, Møre og Romsdal – second half of the 15th century.
- Haltdalen Stave Church, in Holtålen Municipality (now at Sverresborg in Trondheim), Trøndelag – 1170–1179.
- Hedalen Stave Church, in Sør-Aurdal Municipality, Innlandet – second half of the 12th century.
- Heddal Stave Church, in Notodden Municipality, Telemark – beginning of the 13th century.
- Hegge Stave Church, in Øystre Slidre Municipality, Innlandet – 1216.
- Hopperstad Stave Church, in Vik Municipality, Vestland – 1140.
- Høre Stave Church, in Vang Municipality, Innlandet – 1179.
- Høyjord Stave Church, in Sandefjord Municipality, Vestfold – second half of the 12th century.
- Kaupanger Stave Church, in Sogndal Municipality, Vestland – 1190.
- Kvernes Stave Church, in Averøy Municipality, Møre og Romsdal – second half of the 14th century.
- Lomen Stave Church, in Vestre Slidre Municipality, Innlandet – 1179.
- Lom Stave Church, in Lom Municipality, Innlandet – 1158.
- Nore Stave Church, in Nore og Uvdal Municipality, Buskerud – 1167.
- Øye Stave Church, in Vang Municipality, Innlandet – second half of the 12th century.
- Reinli Stave Church, in Sør-Aurdal Municipality, Innlandet – 1190.
- Ringebu Stave Church, in Ringebu Municipality, Innlandet – first quarter of the 13th century.
- Rollag Stave Church, in Rollag Municipality, Buskerud – second half of the 12th century.
- Rødven Stave Church, in Rauma Municipality, Møre og Romsdal – c. 1200.
- Røldal Stave Church, in Ullensvang Municipality, Vestland – first half of the 13th century (could be a post church).
- Torpo Stave Church, in Ål Municipality, Buskerud – 1192.
- Undredal Stave Church, in Aurland Municipality, Vestland – middle of the 12th century.
- Urnes Stave Church, in Luster Municipality, Vestland – first half of the 12th century (on UNESCO's World Heritage Site).
- Uvdal Stave Church, in Nore og Uvdal Municipality, Buskerud – 1168.

==== Outside Norway ====
- Vang Stave Church, moved from Norway to Poland in 1842.
- Hedared Stave Church, Sweden, c. 1500, built on the site of an earlier stave church.
- Greensted Church, England, 845 or 1053, the only one palisade church is known to survive, has been claimed to be the oldest wooden church in the world, and probably the oldest wooden building in Europe still standing.

=== Notable replicas and later built churches ===
- Skaga Stave Church in Töreboda, Västra Götaland county, Sweden, built in the 12th century, torn down in the 19th century, rebuilt in the 1950s, burnt down, and rebuilt again in 2001.
- Heimaey stave church at Heimaey, Vestmannaeyjar, Iceland, built in 2000.
- Chapel in the Hills in Rapid City, South Dakota, United States, a replica of Borgund Stave Church, 1969.
- Little Norway, Wisconsin, United States, relocated to Orkdal, Norway, in 2016.
- Fantoft Stave Church, in Bergen Municipality, Norway, built c. 1150, destroyed by arson in 1992 and rebuilt in 1997.
- Fåvang Stave Church in Ringebu Municipality, Innlandet, Norway, rebuilt in 1630 (two old churches rebuilt as one).
- Hjemkomst Center in Moorhead, Minnesota, United States, Hopperstad replica built in 1998.
- Washington Island Stavkirke on Washington Island, Wisconsin. Its design is based on the Borgund Stave Church, and was built between 1983 and 1995.

== See also ==
- Churches in Norway
- Architecture of Norway
- Medieval Scandinavian architecture
- Wooden Churches of Maramureș – Transylvanian churches of similar character
- Painted Churches in the Troödos Region – wooden-roofed medieval churches in Cyprus
- Kizhi and Kizhi Pogost – an open-air museum of Russian wooden architecture
- Churches of Chiloé
- Heathen hof
- Black metal church arsons

== Sources ==
- Moynihan, Michael; Søderlind, Didrik (2003) [1998]. Lords of Chaos: The Bloody Rise of the Satanic Metal Underground (Revised and expanded ed.). Port Townsend, Washington: Feral House. ISBN 0-922915-94-6.
- Williams, Thomas J. T. (May 2012). "A Blaze in the Northern Sky: Black Metal and Crimes Against Culture". Public Archaeology. 11 (2). Maney Publishing: 59–72. doi:10.1179/1465518712Z.0000000006. S2CID 145058950.
