= Ulsberg =

Village in Rennebu Municipality, Norway

- Village
- Interactive map of Ulsberg
- Location within Trøndelag Location within Norway
- Coordinates: 62.7514°N 09.9842°E
- Country: Norway
- Region: Central Norway
- County: Trøndelag
- District: Orkdalen
- Municipality: Rennebu Municipality
- Elevation: 419 m (1,375 ft)
- Time zone: UTC+01:00 (CET)
  - Summer (DST): UTC+02:00 (CEST)
- Post Code: 7397 Rennebu

Ulsberg is a village in Rennebu Municipality in Trøndelag county, Norway. The village is located along the Orkla River about 9 kilometres (5.6 mi) south of the village of Berkåk and about 4 kilometres (2.5 mi) northwest of the village of Innset. The village sits at the junction of the Norwegian National Road 3 and the European route E06 highway. The Dovrebanen railway line passes through the village.
