= Innset, Trøndelag =

Village in Rennebu Municipality, Norway

Innset
- Village
- Interactive map of Innset
- Location within Trøndelag Location within Norway
- Coordinates: 62.7208°N 10.0426°E
- Country: Norway
- Region: Central Norway
- County: Trøndelag
- District: Orkdalen
- Municipality: Rennebu Municipality
- Elevation: 559 m (1,834 ft)
- Time zone: UTC+01:00 (CET)
  - Summer (DST): UTC+02:00 (CEST)
- Post Code: 7398 Rennebu

Innset is a village in Rennebu Municipality in Trøndelag county, Norway. The village is located along the Orkla River about 14 kilometres (8.7 mi) southeast of the village of Berkåk, about 5 kilometres (3.1 mi) southeast of the village of Ulsberg, and about 22 kilometres (14 mi) northeast of the village of Kvikne (in neighboring Tynset Municipality). Innset Church is located in the village, just north of the Norwegian National Road 3.

== History ==
The parish of Innset (the village and surrounding rural area) was originally an annex to the old Kvikne Municipality (in Hedmark county), but in 1966 it was transferred to Rennebu Municipality (in the old Sør-Trøndelag county) due to the work of the Schei Committee.

=== Name ===
The parish of Innset was established in 1642. It was named after the old Innset farm (Old Norse: Ínnarsetr) since that was where the Innset Church was built. The first element is the genitive case of the name of the river Inna (Old Norse: Ínn) and the last element is setr which means "mountain farm". The meaning of the river name is unknown. Until 1918 the name was written "Inset".
