= Norwegian National Road 3 =

Road in Norway

National Road 3
- Bokmål: Riksvei 3 Nynorsk: Riksveg 3
- Den grønne Snarvei ("The green shortcut")

Route information
- Maintained by Norwegian Public Roads Administration
- Length: 290 km (180 mi)

Major junctions
- North end: Ulsberg, Rennebu Municipality
- E6 – Trondheim, Oppdal; Rv25 east – Elverum; To Rv2 – Kongsvinger; Rv25 west – Hamar; E6 – Hamar, Eidsvoll
- South end: Starhellinga, Stange Municipality

Location
- Country: Norway

Highway system
- Roads in Norway; National Roads; County Roads
← Rv2	→ Rv4

Norwegian National Road 3 (Norwegian: Riksvei 3, Rv3) is a Norwegian national road that is the main route through the Østerdalen district in Eastern Norway. It has been dubbed Den grønne Snarvei which means 'the green shortcut' by the old Hedmark County Municipality. The route runs south from European Route E6 at Ulsberg in Rennebu Municipality in Trøndelag county, via Tynset and Elverum, to Stange in Innlandet county, where it rejoins European Route E6. The route was 291.3 kilometers (181.0 mi) long, of which 277.9 kilometers (172.7 mi) are in Innlandet county and 13.4 kilometers (8.3 mi) are in Trøndelag county.

National Road 3 is the route most used for transport between Oslo and Trondheim, carrying approximately 90% of heavy traffic and most of the passenger car traffic between the two cities. This is because the route is about 42 kilometers (26 mi) shorter in comparison to European Route E6, has better curvature, goes through fewer towns, and has smaller grades. Unlike the E6 over the Dovrefjell mountain range, National Road 3 is also never closed due to winter weather. There have therefore been proposals to reroute the E6 to Østerdalen (along the route of National Road 3). This is however not the official plan. Big money is spent to upgrade about 100 kilometres (62 mi) of E6 (Øyer–Stange) to four-lane motorway and upgrade of long other parts of E6. Much less is spent on Road 3, although 14 kilometres (8.7 mi) of four-lane motorway was opened in 2020, but not much more investment is planned.

== History ==
From 1965 to 1992, National Road 3 followed a route from Ulsberg to Kongsvinger via Tynset and Elverum. The segment between Løten and Ommangsvolden was designated National Road 211. As part of the 1992 European route reform, the route from Elverum to Kongsvinger was redesignated National Road 20, and is now part of National Road 2.

A new bridge at Åsta was completed in 2014 and stands about 30 meters (98 ft) west of the old bridge. It is part of the newly built segment of the road between Skjærodden and Nygarden in Åmot Municipality.

A new 14-kilometre (8.7 mi) four-lane motorway (between Løten and Elverum) and 9 kilometres (5.6 mi) more new road was opened in 2020. This completed project shortened the length of this road by about 1–2 kilometres (0.62–1.24 mi).
