= Innset Church =

Church in Trøndelag, Norway

- Innset kirke
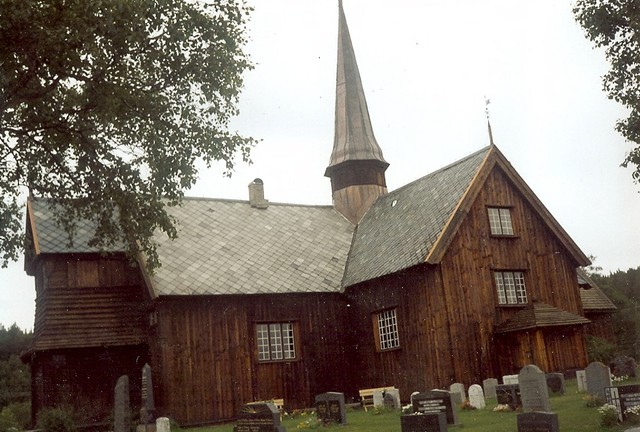
- View of the church
- Innset Church
- 62.72032606°N 10.042519122°E
- Location: Rennebu Municipality, Trøndelag
- Country: Norway
- Denomination: Church of Norway
- Churchmanship: Evangelical Lutheran

History
- Status: Parish church
- Founded: 1642
- Consecrated: 22 Oct 2000
- Events: 1995: Church fire

Architecture
- Functional status: Active
- Architect: Kjell Kvernaas
- Architectural type: Cruciform
- Style: Baroque
- Completed: 2000 (26 years ago)

Specifications
- Capacity: 240
- Materials: Wood

Administration
- Diocese: Nidaros bispedømme
- Deanery: Gauldal prosti
- Parish: Innset
- Norwegian Cultural Heritage Site
- Type: Church
- Status: Not protected
- ID: 84725

Innset Church (Norwegian: Innset kirke) is a parish church of the Church of Norway in Rennebu Municipality in Trøndelag county, Norway. It is located in the village of Innset. It is the church for the Innset parish which is part of the Gauldal prosti (deanery) in the Diocese of Nidaros. The church was built in a cruciform style in 2000 using plans drawn up by the architect Kjell Kvernaas. The church has a natural wood exterior and it seats about 300 people. Innset church is a popular church for concerts.

== History ==
Innset was originally part of Kvikne Municipality in Hedmark county. A copper mine was built in the area during the 17th century. In 1640, a smelting plant was built at Innset, and the village grew up around it. In 1642, the construction of a church was approved. The new church was a Baroque style, cruciform, wooden church that was built by Palle Joensen. It had 300 seats. In 1727, a sacristy was built adjacent to the chancel. In 1966, the old Kvikne Municipality was dissolved and the area where the church is located became part of Rennebu Municipality in Sør-Trøndelag county. This meant that the church became part of the Rennebu parish in the Diocese of Nidaros. The old church burned down in 1995 in an alleged act of arson that was connected with the Norwegian black metal underground.

After the fire and ensuing demolition and clearing of the site, work began on a new church. Kjell Kvernaas was hired to design the new church in the same Baroque, cruciform style as the old building. The exterior was to be very similar to the old. Inside, there are many elements from the old church, although the new building is far more modern and accessible than the old one. The new church was completed in 2000 and consecrate on 22 October 2000.

== Media gallery ==
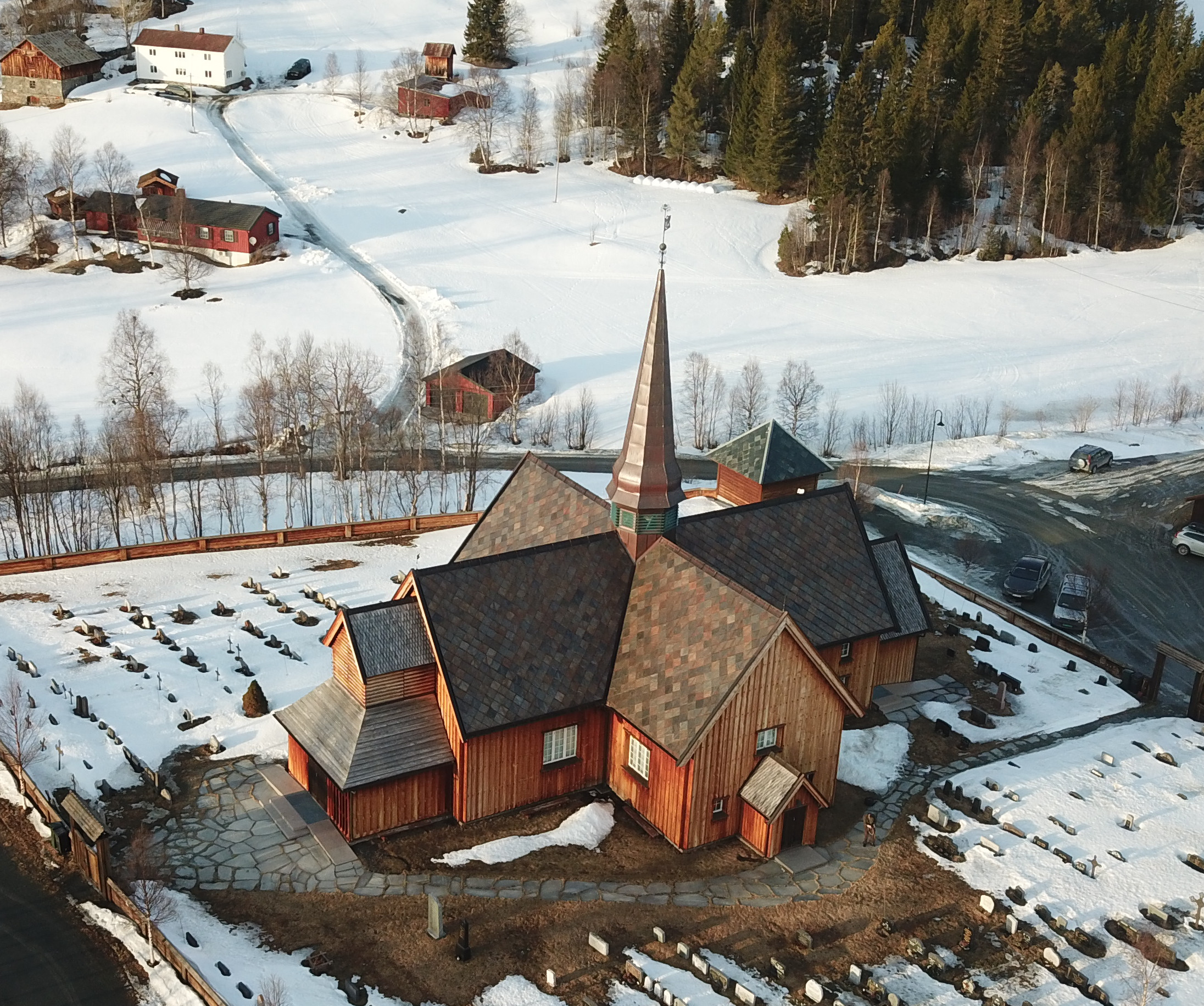
View of the church (2019)

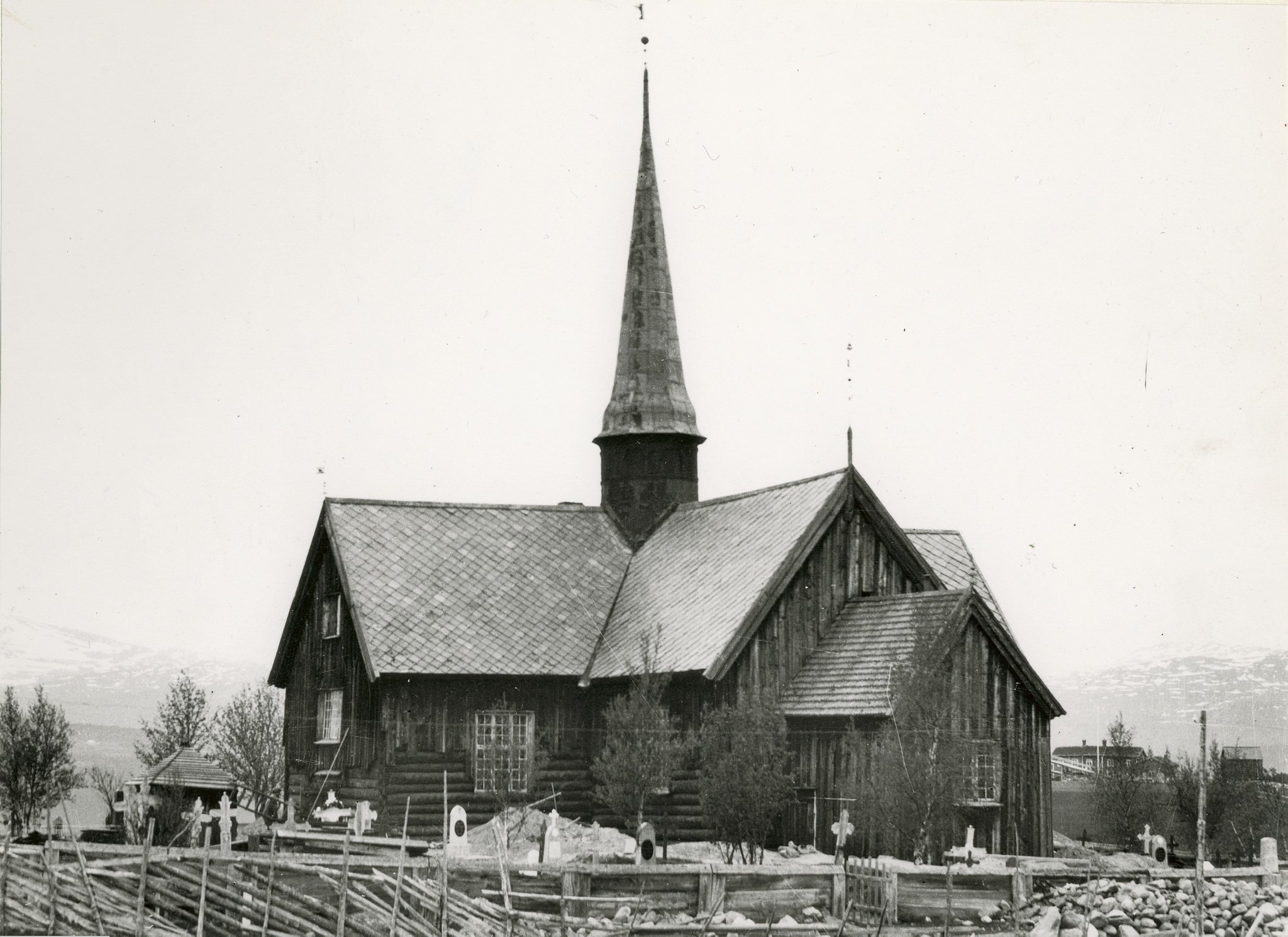
View of the old church that burned down in 1995.

== See also ==
- List of churches in Nidaros
