= Meldal Municipality =

Former municipality in Trøndelag, Norway

Meldal Municipality Meldal kommune
- Former municipality
- Meldalen herred (historic name)
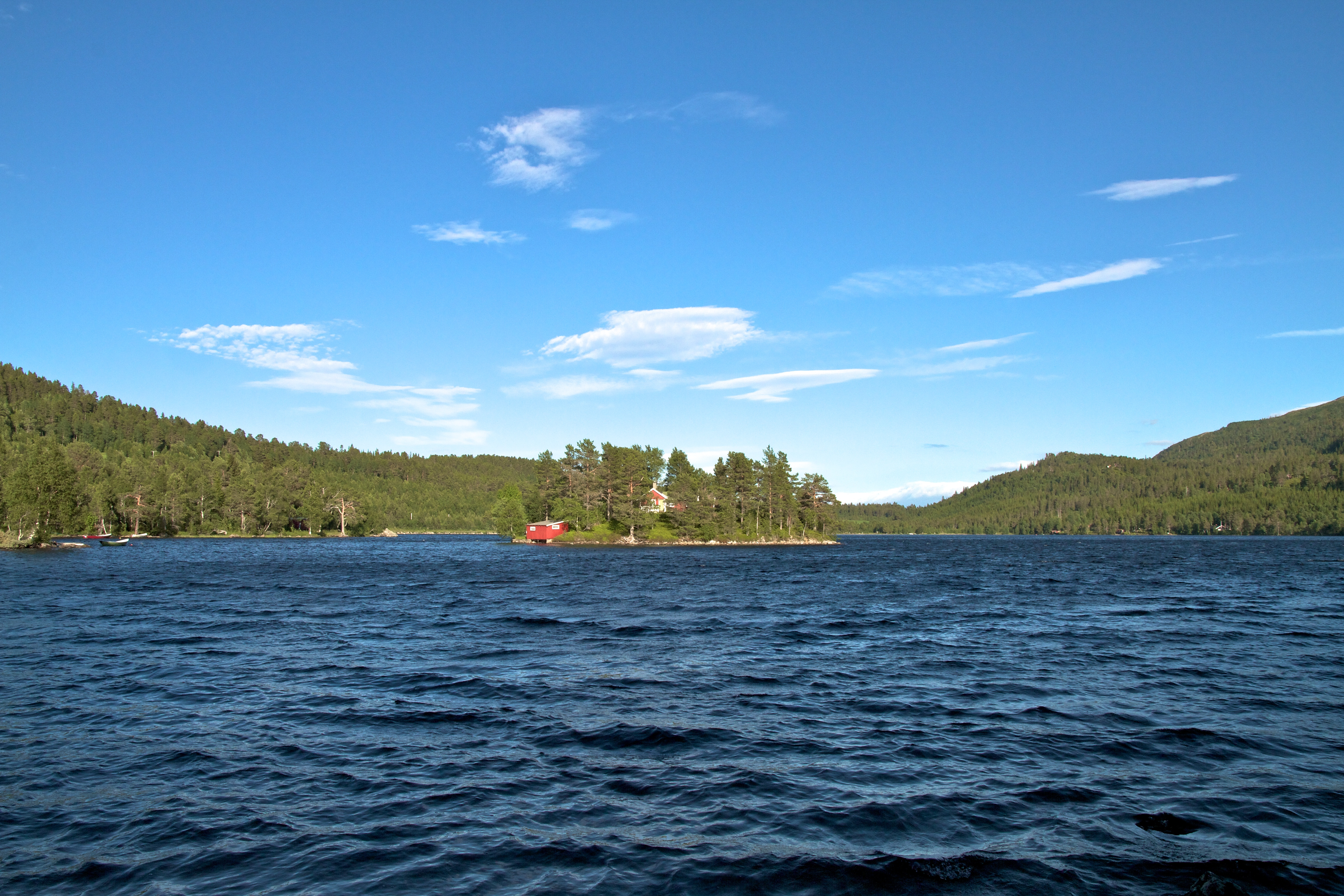
- View of the lake Frilsjøen

- Coat of arms

- Trøndelag within Norway

- Meldal within Trøndelag
- Coordinates: 63°03′04″N 09°44′14″E
- Country: Norway
- County: Trøndelag
- District: Orkdalen
- Established: 1 Jan 1838
  - Created as: Formannskapsdistrikt
- Disestablished: 1 Jan 2020
  - Succeeded by: Orkland Municipality
- Administrative centre: Meldal

Government
  - Mayor (2011): Are Hilstad (Sp)

Area (upon dissolution)
  - Total: 613.25 km^{2} (236.78 sq mi)
  - Land: 592.20 km^{2} (228.65 sq mi)
  - Water: 21.05 km^{2} (8.13 sq mi) 3.4%
  - Rank: #184 in Norway
- Highest elevation: 1,162 m (3,812 ft)

Population (2019)
  - Total: 3,905
  - Rank: #233 in Norway
  - Density: 6.4/km^{2} (17/sq mi)
  - Change (10 years): ▲ +0.3%
- Demonym: Meldaling

Official language
  - Norwegian form: Neutral
- Time zone: UTC+01:00 (CET)
  - Summer (DST): UTC+02:00 (CEST)
- ISO 3166 code: NO-5023

Meldal is a former municipality in Trøndelag county, Norway. The municipality existed from 1838 until its dissolution in 2020 when it joined Orkland Municipality. It was part of the Orkdalen region. The administrative centre of the municipality was the village of Meldal. Other villages included Løkken Verk, Bjørnli, Å, and Storås.

At the time of its dissolution in 2020, the 613-square-kilometre (237 sq mi) municipality was the 184th largest by area out of the 422 municipalities in Norway. Meldal Municipality was also the 233rd most populous municipality in Norway with a population of 3,905. The municipality's population density was 6.4 inhabitants per square kilometre (17/sq mi) and its population had increased by 0.3% over the previous 10-year period.

The municipality was most renowned for its mining activities at Løkken Verk, being the birthplace of the Orkla mining company, now Orkla Group. It was also home to the annual Storåsfestivalen music festival.

== General information ==
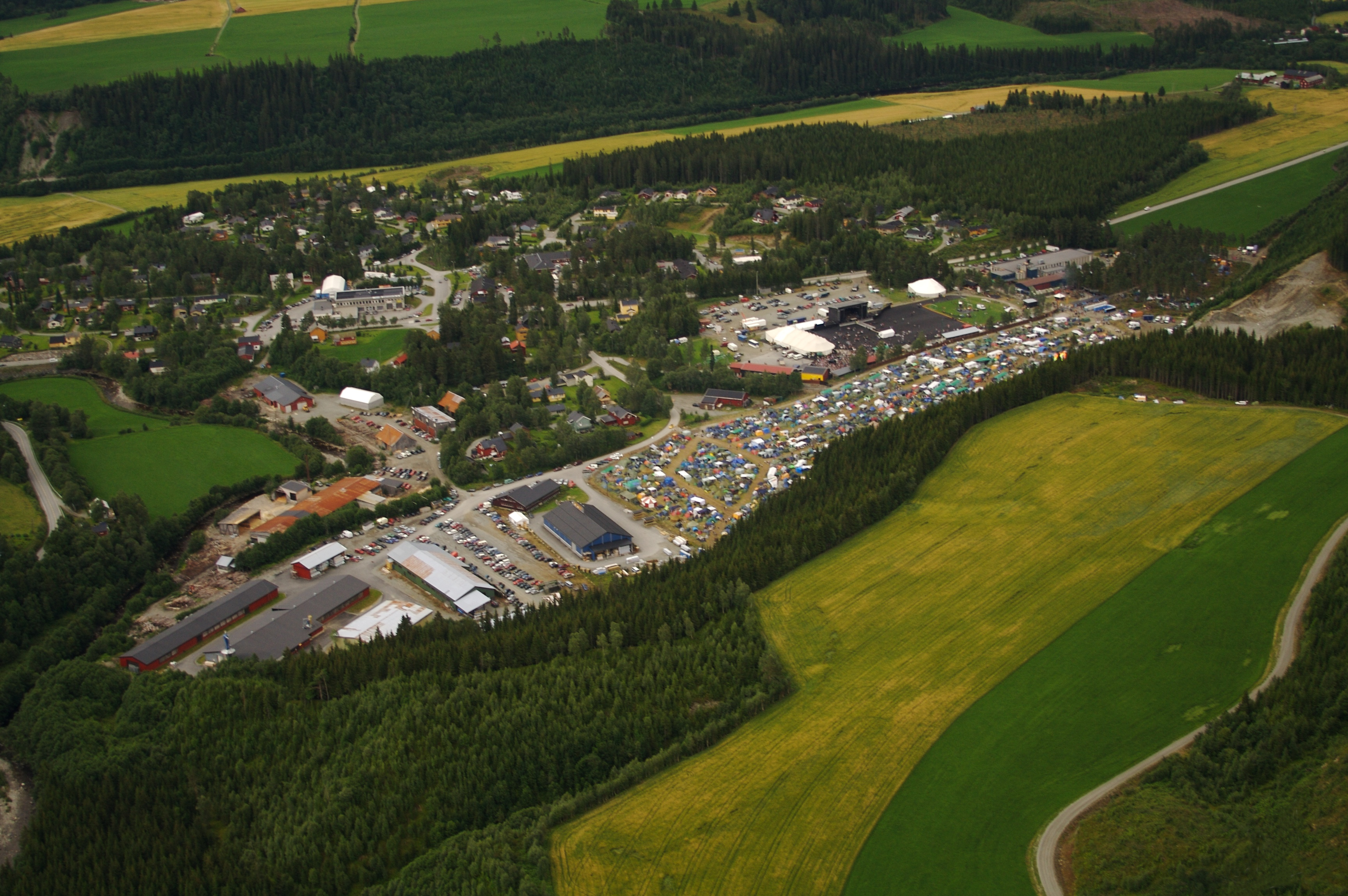
The area of the Storås Festival in Meldal

The parish of Meldal was established as a municipality on 1 January 1838 (see formannskapsdistrikt law). In 1839, the southern district of Meldal (population: 2,368) was separated to form the new Rennebu Municipality. This left Meldal with 3,184 residents.

On 1 January 2018, the municipality switched from the old Sør-Trøndelag county to the new Trøndelag county.

On 1 January 2020, the neighboring Agdenes Municipality, Orkdal Municipality, and Meldal Municipality, plus the majority of Snillfjord Municipality were merged to form the new Orkland Municipality.

=== Name ===
The municipality (originally the parish) is named Meldal (Old Norse: Meðaldalr) after its location in the Orkdalen valley. The first element is meðal which means "middle". The last element is dalr which means "valley" or "dale". Thus the name means "the middle of the valley". Historically, the name of the municipality was spelled Meldalen. On 3 November 1917, a royal resolution changed the spelling of the name of the municipality to Meldal, removing the definite form ending -en.

=== Coat of arms ===
The coat of arms was granted on 5 February 1985 and it was in use until 1 January 2020 when the municipality was dissolved. The official blazon is "Gules, an ear of corn in a roundel voided embattled Or" (Norwegian: I rød, et gull kornaks i tannhjul). This means the arms have a red field (background) and the charge is the top of an ear of corn inside a gear-shaped circular ring. The charge has a tincture of Or which means it is commonly colored yellow, but if it is made out of metal, then gold is used. The design was chosen to symbolize the importance of local industry and agriculture. The arms were designed by Harald Ekseth.

=== Churches ===
The Church of Norway had two parishes (sokn) within Meldal Municipality. It is part of the Gauldal prosti (deanery) in the Diocese of Nidaros.

Churches in Meldal Municipality
Parish (sokn)	Church name	Location of the church	Year built
Løkken	Løkken Church	Bjørnli	1929
Meldal	Meldal Church	Meldal	1988

== Geography ==
Meldal Municipality was located along the Orkla River in the middle of the Orkdalen valley. The lakes Hostovatnet and Svorksjøen were located along the northern border of the municipality. The highest point in the municipality was the 1,162-metre (3,812 ft) tall mountain Resfjellet, near the border with Rindal Municipality.

There were five municipalities that bordered Meldal: Rindal Municipality to the west, Rennebu Municipality to the south, Midtre Gauldal Municipality and Melhus Municipality to the east, and Orkdal Municipality to the north.

The Løkken Station was the terminal station on the historic Thamshavn Line railway that used to travel through the municipality.

== Government ==
While it existed, Meldal Municipality was responsible for primary education (through 10th grade), outpatient health services, senior citizen services, welfare and other social services, zoning, economic development, and municipal roads and utilities. The municipality was governed by a municipal council of directly elected representatives. The mayor was indirectly elected by a vote of the municipal council. The municipality was under the jurisdiction of the Sør-Trøndelag District Court and the Frostating Court of Appeal. Waste management was from 1995 handled by the inter-municipal agency HAMOS Forvaltning.

=== Municipal council ===
The municipal council (Kommunestyre) of Meldal Municipality is made up of 19 representatives that are elected to four year terms. The tables below show the historical composition of the council by political party.

Meldal kommunestyre 2015–2019
Party name (in Norwegian)	Number of representatives
Labour Party (Arbeiderpartiet)	10
Progress Party (Fremskrittspartiet)	1
Conservative Party (Høyre)	1
Centre Party (Senterpartiet)	5
Joint list of the Liberal Party (Venstre) and Christian Democratic Party (Kristelig Folkeparti)	2
Total number of members:	19

Meldal kommunestyre 2011–2015
Party name (in Norwegian)	Number of representatives
Labour Party (Arbeiderpartiet)	9
Progress Party (Fremskrittspartiet)	1
Conservative Party (Høyre)	1
Christian Democratic Party (Kristelig Folkeparti)	1
Centre Party (Senterpartiet)	7
Total number of members:	19

Meldal kommunestyre 2007–2011
Party name (in Norwegian)	Number of representatives
Labour Party (Arbeiderpartiet)	9
Progress Party (Fremskrittspartiet)	1
Christian Democratic Party (Kristelig Folkeparti)	1
Centre Party (Senterpartiet)	5
Joint list of the Conservative Party (Høyre) and the Liberal Party (Venstre)	3
Total number of members:	19

Meldal kommunestyre 2003–2007
Party name (in Norwegian)	Number of representatives
Labour Party (Arbeiderpartiet)	10
Centre Party (Senterpartiet)	7
Joint list of the Conservative Party (Høyre), Christian Democratic Party (Kristelig Folkeparti), and Liberal Party (Venstre)	3
Meldal List (Meldalslista)	2
Total number of members:	25

Meldal kommunestyre 1999–2003
Party name (in Norwegian)	Number of representatives
Labour Party (Arbeiderpartiet)	13
Centre Party (Senterpartiet)	7
Joint list of the Conservative Party (Høyre), Christian Democratic Party (Kristelig Folkeparti), and Liberal Party (Venstre)	5
Total number of members:	25

Meldal kommunestyre 1995–1999
Party name (in Norwegian)	Number of representatives
Labour Party (Arbeiderpartiet)	14
Conservative Party (Høyre)	1
Christian Democratic Party (Kristelig Folkeparti)	2
Centre Party (Senterpartiet)	7
Liberal Party (Venstre)	1
Total number of members:	25

Meldal kommunestyre 1991–1995
Party name (in Norwegian)	Number of representatives
Labour Party (Arbeiderpartiet)	12
Conservative Party (Høyre)	2
Christian Democratic Party (Kristelig Folkeparti)	1
Centre Party (Senterpartiet)	8
Socialist Left Party (Sosialistisk Venstreparti)	2
Total number of members:	25

Meldal kommunestyre 1987–1991
Party name (in Norwegian)	Number of representatives
Labour Party (Arbeiderpartiet)	13
Centre Party (Senterpartiet)	5
Socialist Left Party (Sosialistisk Venstreparti)	1
Joint list of the Conservative Party (Høyre), Christian Democratic Party (Kristelig Folkeparti), Liberal People's Party (Liberale Folkepartiet), and Liberal Party (Venstre)	6
Total number of members:	25

Meldal kommunestyre 1983–1987
Party name (in Norwegian)	Number of representatives
Labour Party (Arbeiderpartiet)	15
Conservative Party (Høyre)	2
Christian Democratic Party (Kristelig Folkeparti)	1
Liberal People's Party (Liberale Folkepartiet)	1
Centre Party (Senterpartiet)	4
Socialist Left Party (Sosialistisk Venstreparti)	1
Liberal Party (Venstre)	1
Total number of members:	25

Meldal kommunestyre 1979–1983
Party name (in Norwegian)	Number of representatives
Labour Party (Arbeiderpartiet)	14
Conservative Party (Høyre)	2
Christian Democratic Party (Kristelig Folkeparti)	2
New People's Party (Nye Folkepartiet)	1
Centre Party (Senterpartiet)	5
Liberal Party (Venstre)	1
Total number of members:	25

Meldal kommunestyre 1975–1979
Party name (in Norwegian)	Number of representatives
Labour Party (Arbeiderpartiet)	14
Conservative Party (Høyre)	1
Christian Democratic Party (Kristelig Folkeparti)	2
New People's Party (Nye Folkepartiet)	1
Centre Party (Senterpartiet)	5
Socialist Left Party (Sosialistisk Venstreparti)	1
Liberal Party (Venstre)	1
Total number of members:	25

Meldal kommunestyre 1971–1975
Party name (in Norwegian)	Number of representatives
Labour Party (Arbeiderpartiet)	15
Conservative Party (Høyre)	1
Christian Democratic Party (Kristelig Folkeparti)	2
Centre Party (Senterpartiet)	5
Liberal Party (Venstre)	2
Total number of members:	25

Meldal kommunestyre 1967–1971
Party name (in Norwegian)	Number of representatives
Labour Party (Arbeiderpartiet)	16
Conservative Party (Høyre)	1
Christian Democratic Party (Kristelig Folkeparti)	1
Centre Party (Senterpartiet)	4
Liberal Party (Venstre)	3
Total number of members:	25

Meldal kommunestyre 1963–1967
Party name (in Norwegian)	Number of representatives
Labour Party (Arbeiderpartiet)	16
Conservative Party (Høyre)	1
Christian Democratic Party (Kristelig Folkeparti)	2
Centre Party (Senterpartiet)	4
Liberal Party (Venstre)	2
Total number of members:	25

Meldal herredsstyre 1959–1963
Party name (in Norwegian)	Number of representatives
Labour Party (Arbeiderpartiet)	13
Conservative Party (Høyre)	1
Communist Party (Kommunistiske Parti)	2
Christian Democratic Party (Kristelig Folkeparti)	2
Centre Party (Senterpartiet)	4
Liberal Party (Venstre)	3
Total number of members:	25

Meldal herredsstyre 1955–1959
Party name (in Norwegian)	Number of representatives
Labour Party (Arbeiderpartiet)	15
Conservative Party (Høyre)	1
Communist Party (Kommunistiske Parti)	1
Christian Democratic Party (Kristelig Folkeparti)	2
Farmers' Party (Bondepartiet)	3
Liberal Party (Venstre)	3
Total number of members:	25

Meldal herredsstyre 1951–1955
Party name (in Norwegian)	Number of representatives
Labour Party (Arbeiderpartiet)	14
Conservative Party (Høyre)	1
Communist Party (Kommunistiske Parti)	1
Christian Democratic Party (Kristelig Folkeparti)	2
Farmers' Party (Bondepartiet)	3
Liberal Party (Venstre)	3
Total number of members:	24

Meldal herredsstyre 1947–1951
Party name (in Norwegian)	Number of representatives
Labour Party (Arbeiderpartiet)	12
Conservative Party (Høyre)	1
Communist Party (Kommunistiske Parti)	1
Christian Democratic Party (Kristelig Folkeparti)	2
Farmers' Party (Bondepartiet)	4
Liberal Party (Venstre)	4
Total number of members:	24

Meldal herredsstyre 1945–1947
Party name (in Norwegian)	Number of representatives
Labour Party (Arbeiderpartiet)	13
Communist Party (Kommunistiske Parti)	2
Christian Democratic Party (Kristelig Folkeparti)	2
Farmers' Party (Bondepartiet)	4
Liberal Party (Venstre)	3
Total number of members:	24

Meldal herredsstyre 1937–1941*
Party name (in Norwegian)	Number of representatives
Labour Party (Arbeiderpartiet)	13
Joint List(s) of Non-Socialist Parties (Borgerlige Felleslister)	11
Total number of members:	24
Note: Due to the German occupation of Norway during World War II, no elections were held for new municipal councils until after the war ended in 1945.

=== Mayors ===
The mayor (Norwegian: ordfører) of Meldal Municipality was the political leader of the municipality and the chairperson of the municipal council. Here is a list of people who held this position:

- 1838–1843: Ole Olsen Rigstad
- 1844–1849: Christian Rambech
- 1850–1853: Ole Olsen Rigstad
- 1854–1859: Erik Torgersen Loe
- 1860–1863: Johannes Ring
- 1864–1875: Ole Ellefsen
- 1876–1877: Rasmus Dombu
- 1878–1879: Ole O. Steien
- 1880–1883: Johannes Ring (H)
- 1884–1895: Ole O. Steien (V)
- 1896–1897: Rasmus Dombu (H)
- 1898–1904: Ole O. Steien (V)
- 1905–1907: Rasmus Hoel (H)
- 1908–1910: Anders O. Grut (H)
- 1911–1913: Rasmus Hoel (H)
- 1914–1919: J.E. Grefstad (V)
- 1920–1922: E.L. Staveli (V)
- 1923–1925: Gunnar Ree (Bp)
- 1926–1928: E.L. Staveli (V)
- 1929–1934: Gunnar Ree (Bp)
- 1935–1937: Ingvald Svinsås-Lo (V)
- 1938–1941: Johannes Togstad (Ap)
- 1941–1945: Thorleif Eie (NS)
- 1945–1951: Johannes Togstad (Ap)
- 1952–1956: Anders Kokkvoll (Ap)
- 1956–1967: Johan L. Strand (Ap)
- 1968–1973: Ivar Bolme (Ap)
- 1974–1980: John Akselsen (Ap)
- 1980–2005: Arne L. Haugen (Ap)
- 2005–2007: Ingrid Skarstein (Ap)
- 2007–2011: Ivar Syrstad (Sp)
- 2011–2019: Are Hilstad (Ap)

== See also ==
- List of former municipalities of Norway
