= Meldal (disambiguation) =

Meldal may refer to:

== People ==
- Justin Meldal-Johnsen (born 1970), an American producer, songwriter, bassist, multi-instrumentalist and musical director
- Morten P. Meldal (born 1954), a Danish chemist and professor of chemistry at the University of Copenhagen

== Places ==
=== Canada ===
- Meldal Subdivision, Alberta, a village area in Camrose county in the province of Alberta

=== Norway ===
- Meldal Municipality, a municipality in Trøndelag county
- Meldal (village), a village within Orkland Municipality in Trøndelag county
- Meldal Church, a church in Orkland Municipality in Trøndelag county

== Other ==
- Meldal dialect, a dialect of Norwegian used in parts of Orkland Municipality; it is a variety of Trøndersk

== See also ==
- Meldale, Queensland
