= Rindal =

Rindal may refer to:

== People ==
- Arnt Rindal (1938–2015), Norwegian diplomat who has served as ambassador to several countries
- Johannes Rindal (born 1984), Norwegian politician for the Centre Party

== Places ==
- Rindal Municipality, a municipality in Trøndelag county, Norway
- Rindal (village), the administrative centre of Rindal Municipality in Trøndelag county, Norway
- Rindal Church, a church in Rindal Municipality in Trøndelag county, Norway

== Other ==
- Rindal IL, a sports club from Rindal Municipality in Trøndelag county, Norway

== See also ==
- Rindalism
