= Romundstad =

Romundstad may refer to:

- Romundstad, Trøndelag, a village in the municipality of Rindal in Trøndelag county, Norway
- Romundstad (surname), a Norwegian surname
