= Drogsetmoen =

Village in Orkland Municipality, Norway

Drogsetmoen Dragsetmoen (historic spelling)
- Village
- Interactive map of Drogsetmoen
- Location within Trøndelag Location within Norway
- Coordinates: 63.1184°N 9.61175°E
- Country: Norway
- Region: Central Norway
- County: Trøndelag
- District: Orkdalen
- Municipality: Orkland Municipality
- Elevation: 128 m (420 ft)

Population (2024)
  - Total: 169
- Time zone: UTC+01:00 (CET)
  - Summer (DST): UTC+02:00 (CEST)
- Post Code: 7334 Storås

Drogsetmoen is a village in Orkland Municipality in Trøndelag county, Norway.

The place is located along the river Orkla, about halfway between the villages of Storås and Bjørnli. County Road 65 goes through the little hamlet.
