= Heggem (disambiguation) =

Heggem is a village in Western Norway.

Heggem may also refer to:

- Ola T. Heggem (born 1952), Norwegian politician and farmer
- Thorvald Heggem (1907–1976), Norwegian Nordic combined and cross-country skier
- Torbjørn Heggem (born 1999), Norwegian footballer
- Vegard Heggem (born 1975), Norwegian footballer
