= Norwegian County Road 65 =

County road in Norway

County Road 65

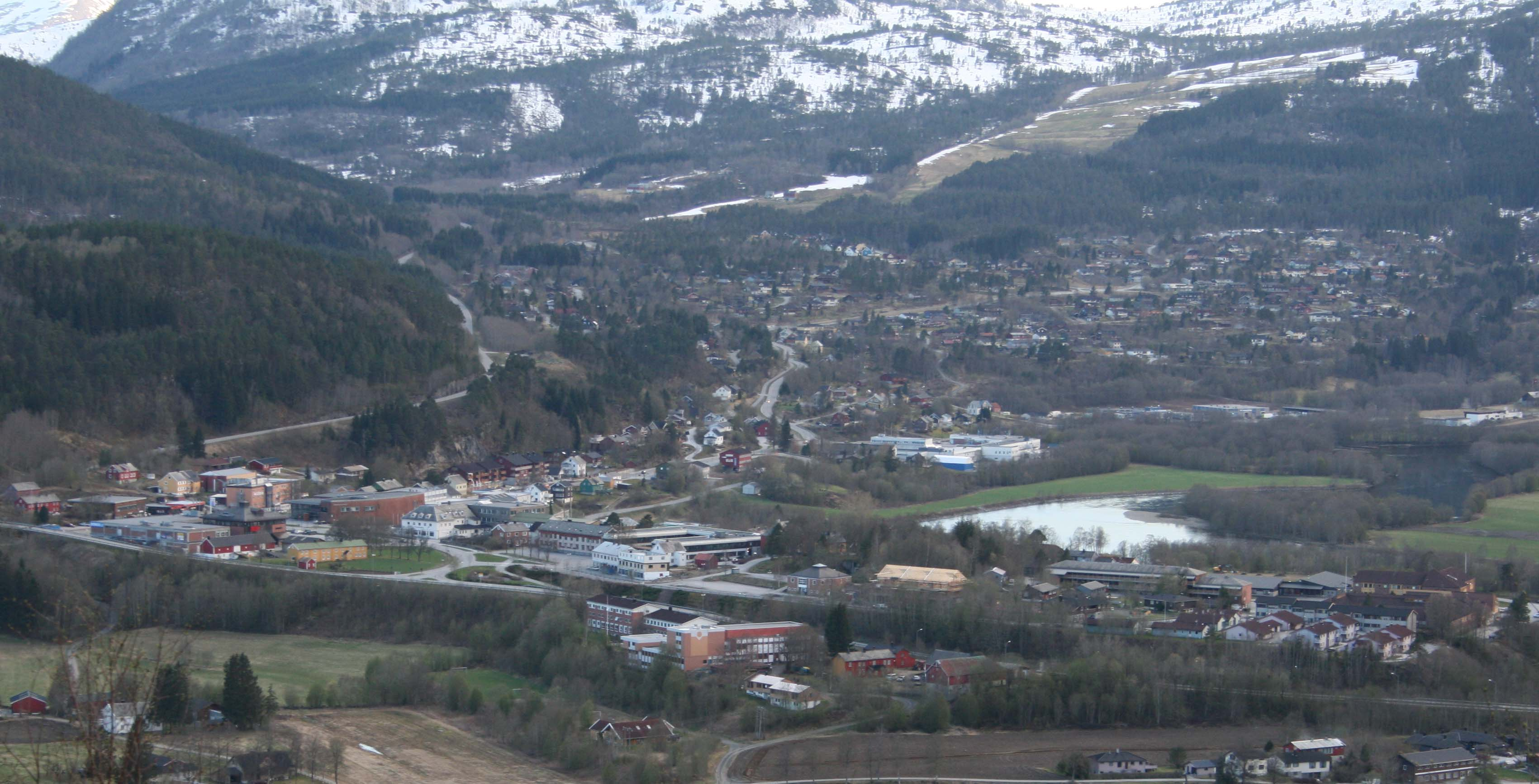
- Skei seen from the northeast with County Road 65 in the foreground

Route information
- Length: 107.92 km (67.06 mi)

Major junctions
- West end: E39 at Betna
- Fv330 at Settemsdal; Fv329 at Bæverfjord; Fv328 at Øye; Fv325 at Øye; Fv326 at Skei; Fv670 at Skei; Fv325 at Honnstad; Fv325 at Røv; Fv325 at Åmot Fv6164 at Bolmen Fv6164 at Bjørnåsen; Fv343 at Øvre Rindal; Fv481 at Storås; Fv701 at Storås; Fv486 at Dragsetmoen; Fv700 at Svorkmo; Fv481 at Vormstad; Fv463 at Forve; Fv462 at Forve; Fv470 at Fannrem
- East end: E39 at Bårdshaug

Location
- Country: Norway
- Counties: Møre og Romsdal and Trøndelag

Highway system
- Roads in Norway; National Roads; County Roads

County Road 65 (Norwegian: Fylkesvei 65) is a 107.92-kilometer (67.06 mi) road in Norway; 74.69 kilometers (46.41 mi) lie in Møre og Romsdal County, and 33.23 kilometers (20.65 mi) lie in Trøndelag County.

After branching off from European route E39 at Betna, the road runs southeast through Møre og Romsdal County to Skei, where it crosses the Surna River. Then it runs east along the left side of the river to Bolmen, continuing east mostly on the other side of the river to the border with Trøndelag County and on to Storås. There it takes a northeast direction along the Orkla River until rejoining European route E39 at Bårdshaug.

Until January 1, 2010, the road was a national road, but it was reclassified as a county road after regional reform. Until October 2, 2015, the section from Forve to Bårdshaug was part of European route E39, which has now been rerouted to the north.
