= Norwegian County Road 6166 =

Road in Møre og Romsdal county, Norway

County Road 6166

Route information
- Length: 13.85 km (8.61 mi)

Major junctions
- West end: Fv6164 at Rindal
- Fv6174 at Helgetun
- East end: Setra

Location
- Country: Norway
- Counties: Møre og Romsdal

Highway system
- Roads in Norway; National Roads; County Roads

County Road 6166 (Norwegian: Fylkesvei 6166) is a 13.85-kilometer (8.61 mi) road in Rindal Municipality in Møre og Romsdal County, Norway. It runs between Rindal, where it branches off from County Road 6164, and Setra, where it dead ends in a spur. Before the terminus of the road, County Road 6174 branches off to the southeast, connecting the Surna Valley and the Orkla Valley. The road runs in a southeast direction, parallel to the Rinda and Ljøsåa Rivers, past the village of Romundstad. A monument to the politician John Neergaard stands next to the road near his birthplace in Romundstad. Prior to 2019, the road was named County Road 341.
