= Øvre Rindal Chapel =

Church in Trøndelag, Norway

- Øvre Rindal kapell
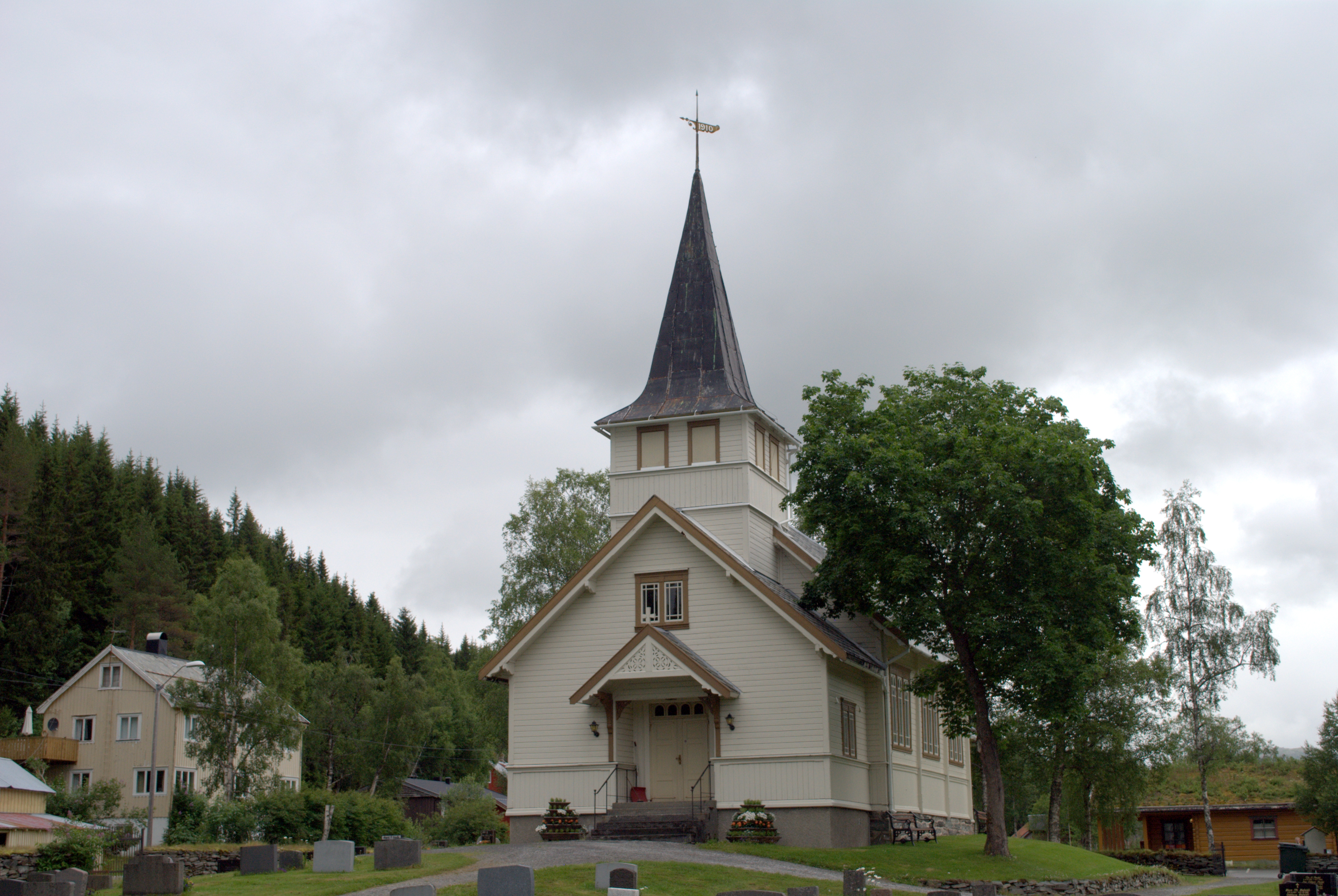
- View of the church
- Øvre Rindal Chapel
- 63.097780647°N 9.3219560086°E
- Location: Rindal Municipality, Trøndelag
- Country: Norway
- Denomination: Church of Norway
- Churchmanship: Evangelical Lutheran

History
- Status: Parish church
- Founded: 1911
- Consecrated: 29 July 1911

Architecture
- Functional status: Active
- Architect: Lars A. Mogstad
- Architectural type: Long church
- Completed: 1911 (115 years ago)

Specifications
- Capacity: 210
- Materials: Wood

Administration
- Diocese: Nidaros bispedømme
- Deanery: Orkdal prosti
- Parish: Rindal
- Norwegian Cultural Heritage Site
- Type: Church
- Status: Regionally protected
- ID: 85927

Øvre Rindal Chapel (Norwegian: Øvre Rindal kapell) is a parish church of the Church of Norway in Rindal Municipality in Trøndelag county, Norway. It is located in the village of Tiset. It is one of the churches for the Rindal parish which is part of the Orkdal prosti (deanery) in the Diocese of Nidaros. The white, wooden church was built in a long church style in 1911 by the architect Lars Anderson Mogstad. The church seats about 210 people.

== History ==
A royal resolution from 22 May 1909 granted permission to erect an annex chapel for Rindal Church in the upper Rindal valley. Drawings were prepared by Lars Andersen Mogstad who used Herman Backer's drawings for Landsmarka Chapel in Lunde Municipality in Telemark. The new chapel was consecrated on 29 July 1911. The chapel was enlarged in 1986 and again in 1990 and was made a full parish church rather than its original "chapel" status.

Historically, the parish of Rindal was part of the Indre Nordmøre prosti (deanery) in the Diocese of Møre. On 1 January 2020, the parish of Rindal was transferred to the Orkdal prosti (deanery) in the Diocese of Nidaros. This transfer is a result of Rindal Municipality being transferred from Møre og Romsdal county to Trøndelag county on 1 January 2019.

== Media gallery ==
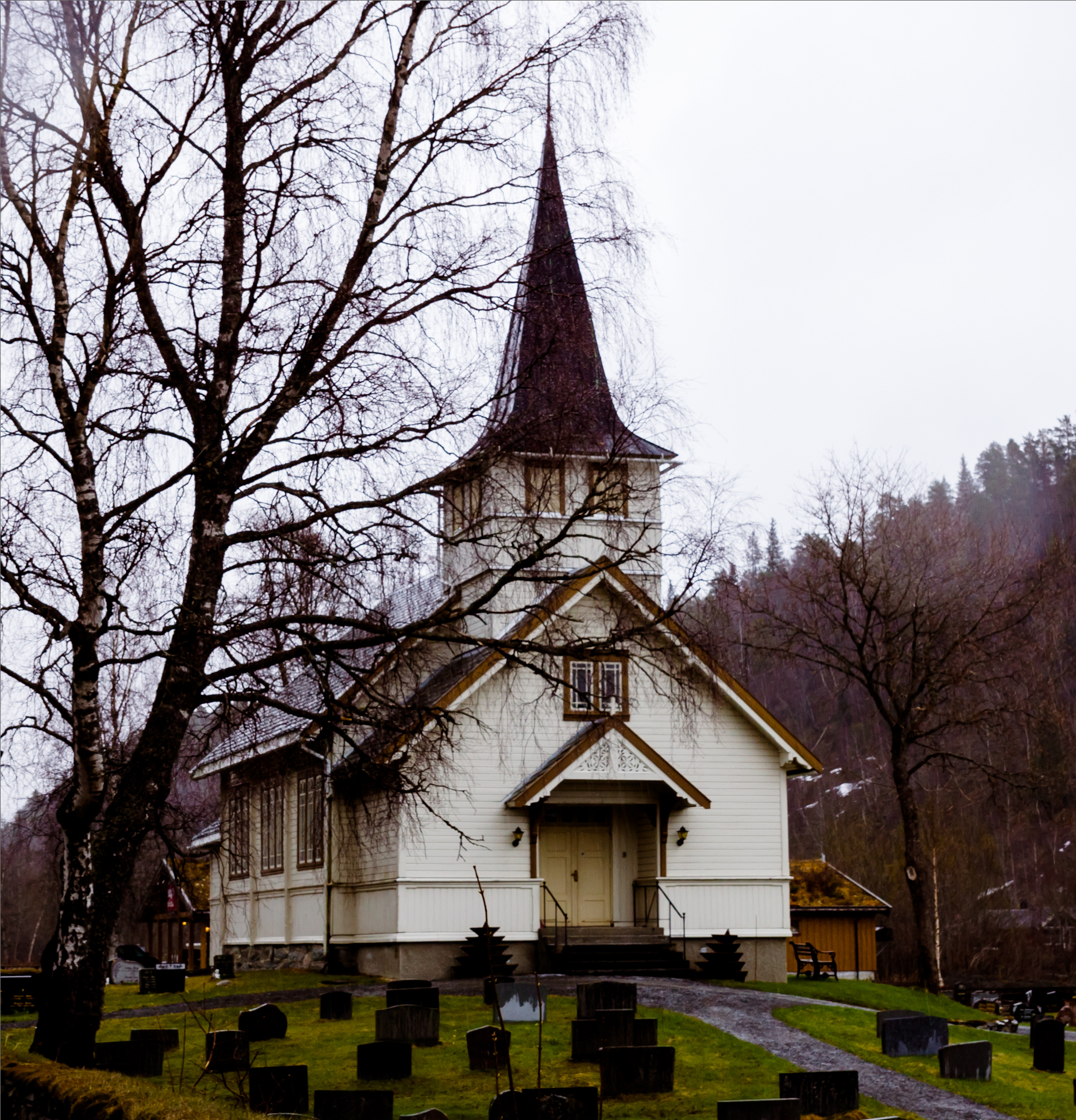

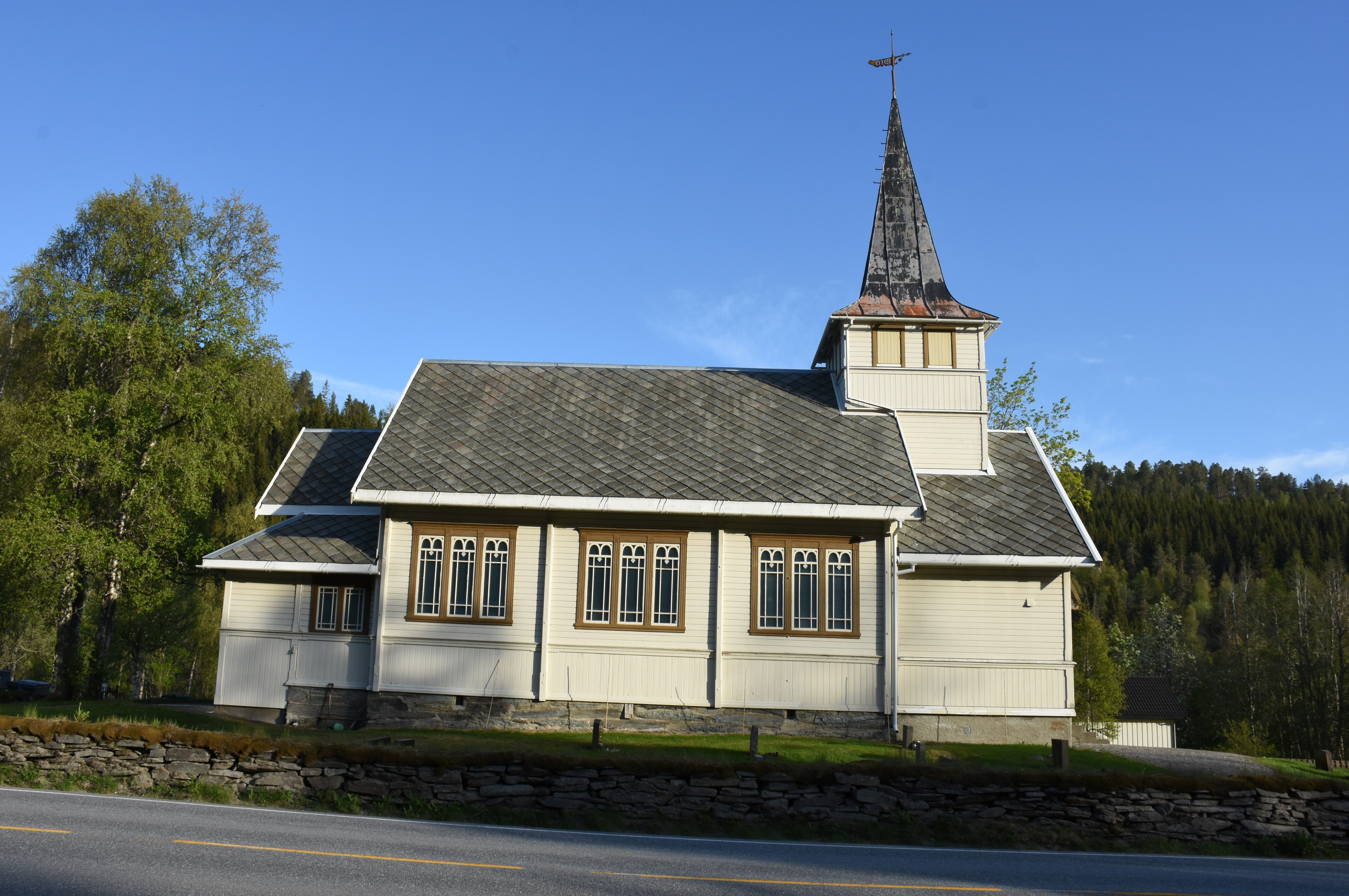

== See also ==
- List of churches in Nidaros
