= Tiset =

Village in Rindal Municipality, Norway

- Village
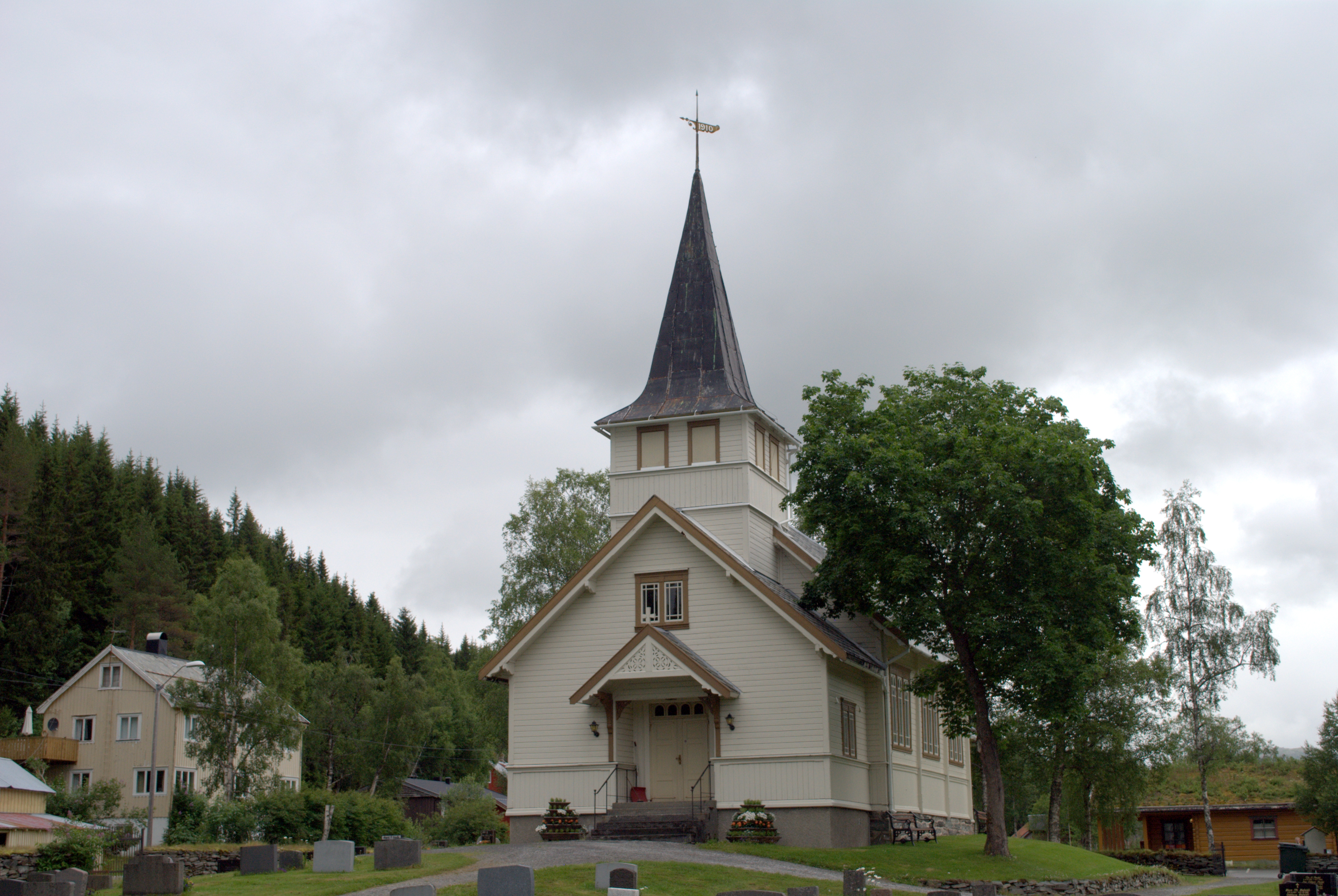
- View of the chapel in Tiset
- Interactive map of Tiset
- Location within Trøndelag Location within Norway
- Coordinates: 63.0983°N 9.3248°E
- Country: Norway
- Region: Central Norway
- County: Trøndelag
- District: Orkdalen
- Municipality: Rindal Municipality
- Elevation: 201 m (659 ft)
- Time zone: UTC+01:00 (CET)
  - Summer (DST): UTC+02:00 (CEST)
- Post Code: 6658 Rindalsskogen

Tiset is a small village area in Rindal Municipality in Trøndelag county, Norway. The village lies along the river Tiåa, a tributary of the large Surna river. The village sits about 10 kilometres (6.2 mi) northeast of the municipal center of Rindal. The Øvre Rindal Chapel is located in the small village.
