= Grønkjølen Nature Reserve =

Nature reserve in Norway

- Grønkjølen naturreservat
- IUCN category Ia (strict nature reserve)
- Interactive map of Grønkjølen Nature Reserve
- Nearest city: Rindal
- Coordinates: 63°06′00″N 9°00′00″E
- Area: 332 ha (820 acres)
- Established: 1996

The Grønkjølen Nature Reserve (Norwegian: Grønkjølen naturreservat) is located on the border of Møre og Romsdal and Trøndelag counties in Norway. The reserve is located in Surnadal Municipality (in Møre og Romsdal), Rindal Municipality, and Heim Municipality (both in Trøndelag).

The nature reserve covers 332.1 hectares (821 acres) and most of it lies in Rindal Municipality. The reserve was established in 1996 to protect a large intact marsh area in a mountainous region, according to the conservation regulations.
