= Norwegian County Road 6164 =

Road in Norway

County Road 6164

Route information
- Length: 6.29 km (3.91 mi)

Major junctions
- West end: Fv65 at Bolmen
- Fv6166 at Rindal; Fv6168 at Gjøabakken
- East end: Fv65 at Bjørnåsen

Location
- Country: Norway
- Counties: Trøndelag

Highway system
- Roads in Norway; National Roads; County Roads

County Road 6164 (Norwegian: Fylkesvei 6164) is a 6.29-kilometer (3.91 mi) road in Rindal Municipality in Trøndelag County, Norway. It runs between Bolmen, where it branches off from County Road 65, and Bjørnåsen, where it rejoins County Road 65. The road initially runs east, crossing the Rinda River, to the junction with County Road 6166, and then turns north, running through the village of Rindal, and then past Igletjønna ('Leech Lake', named for the leeches formerly found there), across Gjø or Jø Creek (Gjøåa, Jøåa) near its confluence with Askjell Creek (Askjellsåa), and past the junction with County Road 6168. Various proposals are in the works for naming local segments of the road (e.g., Rindalsvegen (Rindal Road), Mjohølvegen (Mjohøl Road), etc.). Historically, the road was named County Road 340 prior to 2019 when Rindal was transferred to Trøndelag county.
