= Edvarda Lie =

Norwegian artist, illustrator (1910–1983)

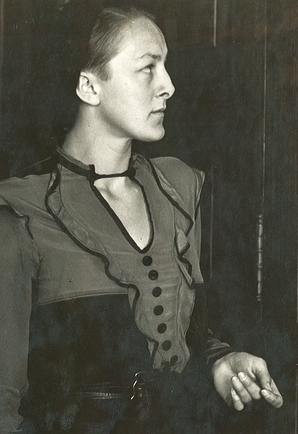
- Born: Edvarda Klaudine Lie; April 3, 1910; Meldal, Norway
- Died: June 8, 1983 (aged 73); Oslo, Norway
- Occupation: Artist

Edvarda Klaudine Lie (April 3, 1910 – June 8, 1983) was a Norwegian painter, drawer, and illustrator.

Edvarda Lie was born in Meldal and grew up in Vestvågøy Municipality. She created illustrations for many newspapers and magazines, including A-magasinet, and she illustrated book covers—for example, a 1946 edition of Ali Baba og de førti røvere (Ali Baba and the Forty Thieves). In 1944 she published Anatomi for tegnere (Anatomy for Drawers), which was reissued in 1976. From 1936 to 1947, Lie taught fashion illustration at the Norwegian National Academy of Craft and Art Industry. From 1960 to 1964, she painted murals for the municipal hall in Narvik Municipality. Her illustrations were often praised for their assertive drawing, light, bright colors, and period decorative style. Her later floral decorations were based on the skirts of traditional women's dress in Lofoten.
