= Romundstad (surname) =

Romundstad is a Norwegian surname. In 2015, there were 199 people with this surname in Norway. The name is originally an estate name referring to a farm, and it is especially frequent in Rindal Municipality.

== Notable people ==
- Lars Sverkeson Romundstad (1885–1961), Norwegian politician
- Jens Romundstad (a.k.a. Biker-Jens; born 1970), Danish television personality
