= Løkken Church =

Church in Trøndelag, Norway

- Løkken kirke
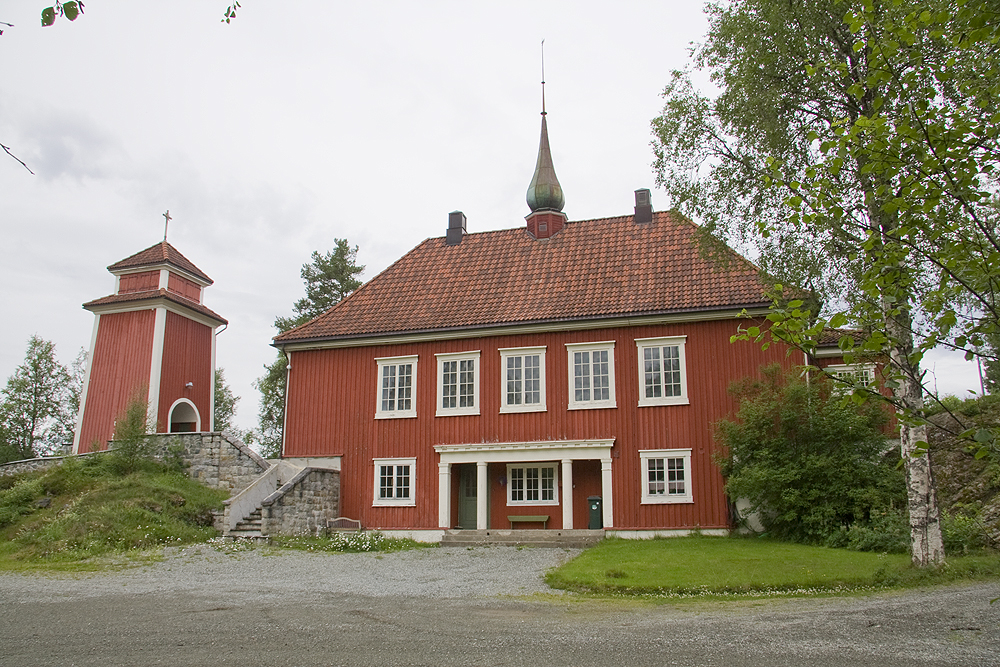
- View of the church
- Løkken Church
- 63°07′38″N 9°40′58″E
- Location: Orkland Municipality, Trøndelag
- Country: Norway
- Denomination: Church of Norway
- Churchmanship: Evangelical Lutheran

History
- Status: Parish church
- Founded: 1913
- Consecrated: 13 Sep 1929

Architecture
- Functional status: Active
- Architect: Roar Tønseth
- Architectural type: Long church
- Completed: 1929 (97 years ago)

Specifications
- Capacity: 170
- Materials: Wood

Administration
- Diocese: Nidaros bispedømme
- Deanery: Orkdal prosti
- Parish: Løkken
- Norwegian Cultural Heritage Site
- Type: Church
- Status: Listed
- ID: 84361

Løkken Church (Norwegian: Løkken kirke) is a parish church of the Church of Norway in Orkland Municipality in Trøndelag county, Norway. It is located in a rural area between the nearby villages of Bjørnli and Løkken Verk. It is the church for the Løkken parish which is part of the Orkdal prosti (deanery) in the Diocese of Nidaros. The red, wooden church was built in a long church style in 1929 using plans drawn up by the architect Roar Tønseth. The church seats about 170 people.

== History ==
Løkken Verk is an old mining village. When the Orkla Group was established in 1904, mining (and the local population) sharply increased and the need for a separate church on the site also increased. The area was part of the Meldal Church parish and it was a long journey to the church for the miners, especially for those who did not have a horse ride. Because of this, the Orkla Group established regular worship services in the mining village. A workers' barracks was converted into an annex chapel for the parish and was taken into use on 28 December 1913. The new chapel had room for about 100 people. However, it soon became apparent that it was becoming too small. There was a service here every fourth Sunday, and interest in the church among the miners and their families was so great that the Orkla Group soon looked for a larger (and also more dignified) house of worship.

The company eventually purchased the shooting range at Bjørnlivatnet. The shooting range had a large building was built in 1916. The building was a magnificent building, designed by architect Morten Bachke. It had a large hall on the upper floor that was used for various events, including a cinema there twice a week for many years. On the lower floor, there was a large, open-air passageway right through the house for patrons to access the shooting range. In front of the shooting range, a large sports field was built in 1923, and the football field there was taken into use in 1924. The company hired the architect Roar Tønseth to redesign the building and to convert it into a chapel. A new, small, narrow tower was constructed on the roof, the passage through the basement floor was closed in, and the basement was converted into an apartment for the church workers. In front of the building, a free-standing bell tower was erected using a bell from 1653 that had previously been used in the old Meldal Church. Indoors, the painters Ole Teien and Oskar Hogstad were commissioned to decorate the new nave on the walls and ceiling. One page contains motifs from the Old Testament and on the other side we find motifs from the New Testament. The decorations between the windows are inspired by decorations from the Kvikne Church. The altarpiece was painted by Ole Mæhle. The newly renovated chapel was consecrated on 13 September 1929. When the chapel was opened, the sports field in front was converted into a beautiful park and the field in the back was used as a burial ground starting in 1930. At the 300th anniversary of mining at Løkken Verk in 1954, the chapel received a gift of a new large magnificent bell that was cast by Olsen Naum.

Since 1929, the Orkla Group has owned and operated the chapel. In 1999, the parish changed its status from annex chapel to parish church. For many years, the Orkla Group also paid the salary to have an auxiliary priest at the church full time. In 2011, this church was the only privately owned parish church left in all of Norway (historically, there had been many, but since the 19th century, this was much less common), so the parish council began talking to the Orkla Group about taking over ownership. In 2012, the Orkla Group formally transferred the ownership of the church to the local parish council, leaving no more privately owned churches in Norway.

== Media gallery ==
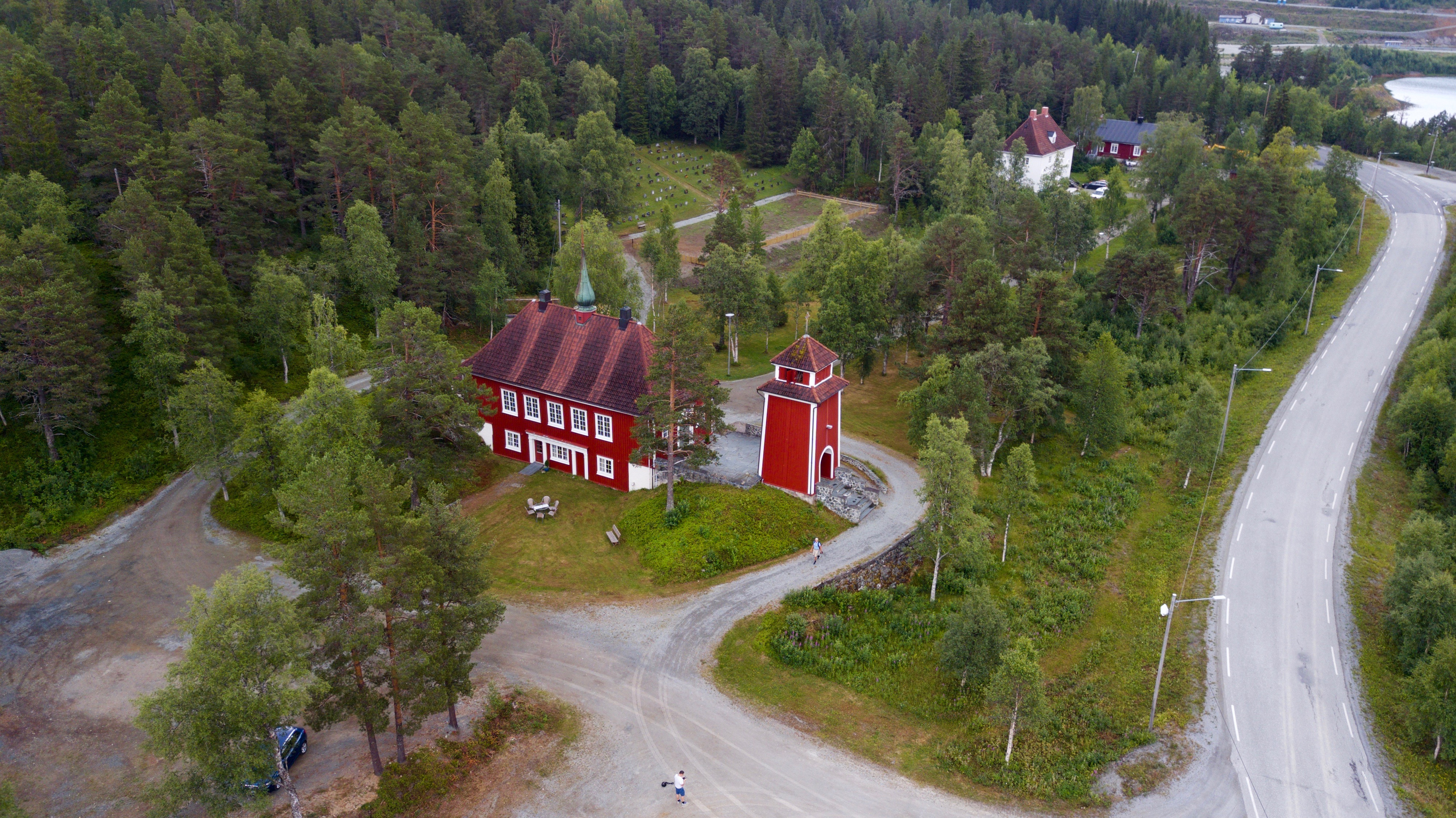

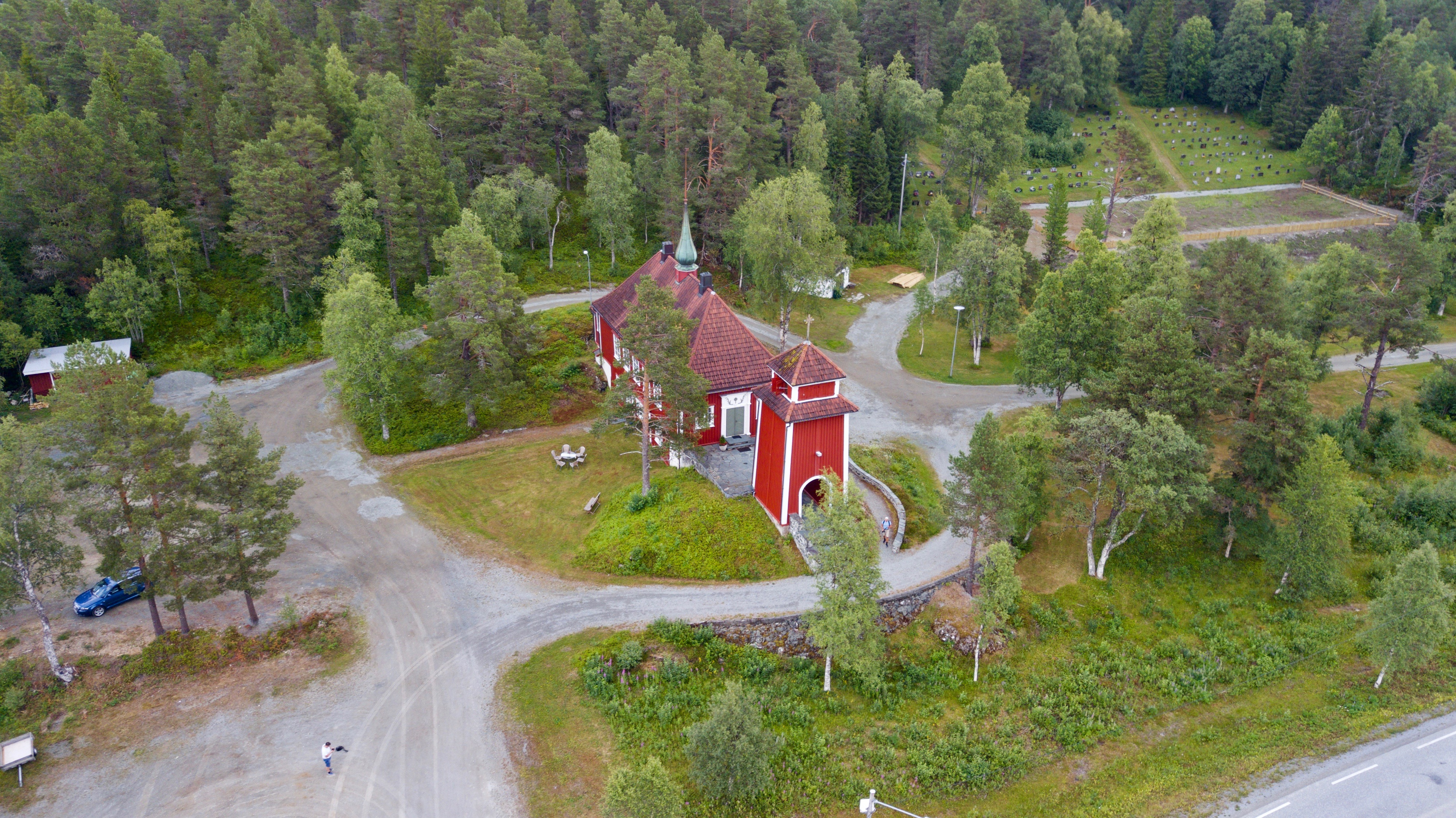

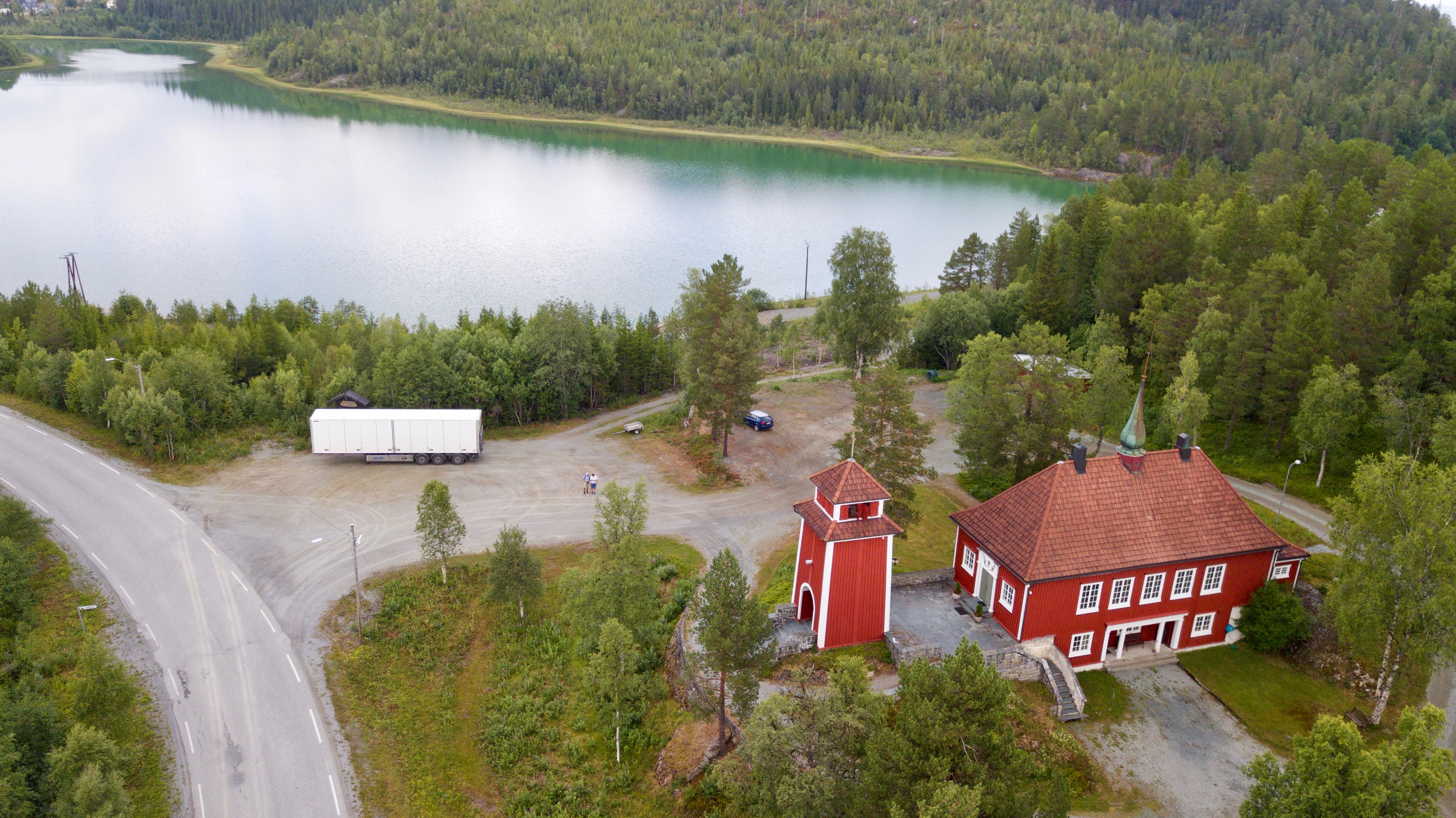

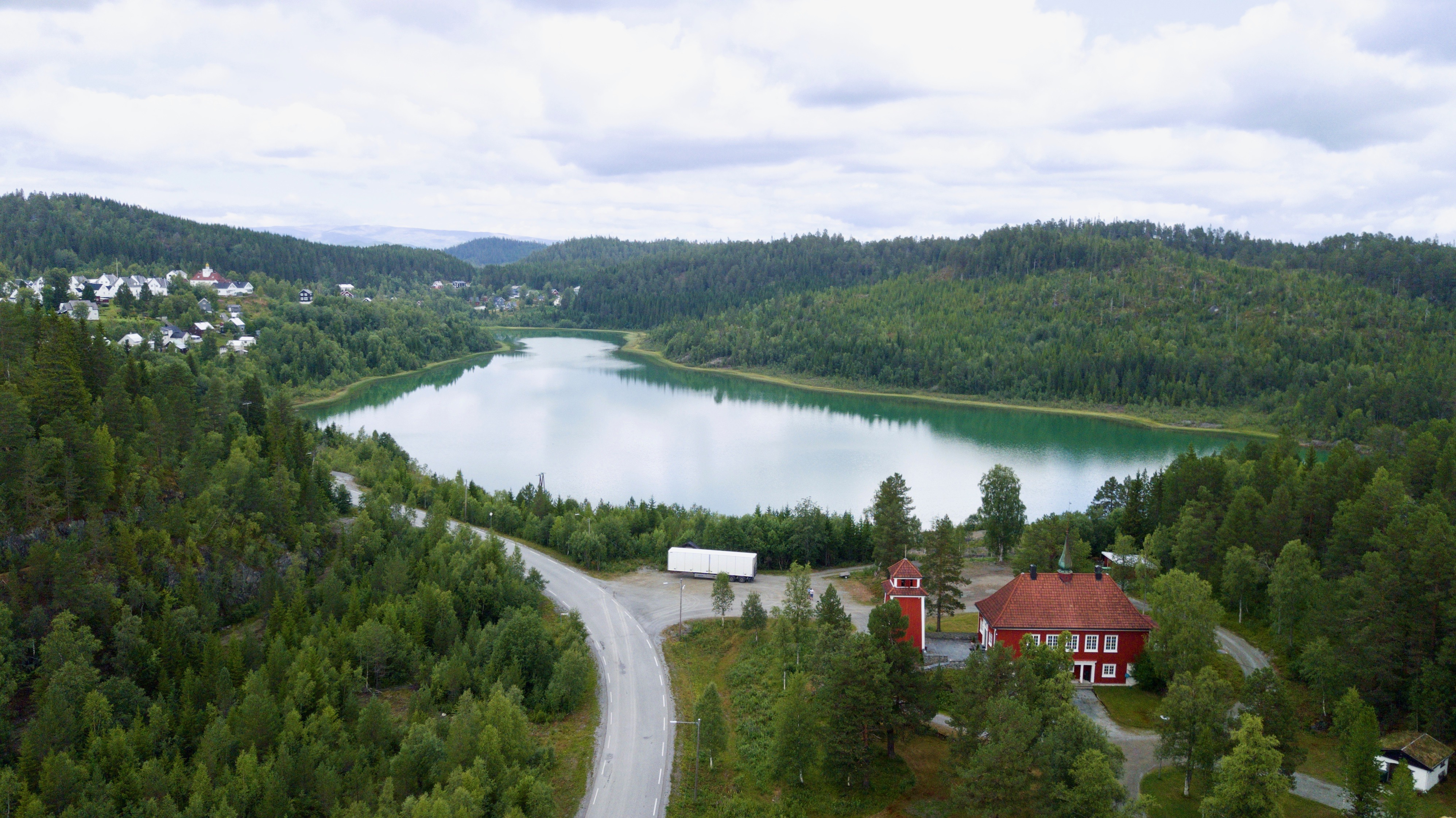

== See also ==
- List of churches in Nidaros
