= John Ole Aspli =

Norwegian politician (born 1956)

John Ole Aspli (born 7 May 1956) is a Norwegian politician for the Labour Party.

He served as a deputy representative to the Norwegian Parliament from Møre og Romsdal during the term 2005–2009.

On the local level, he was mayor of Rindal Municipality from 2007 to 2011.
