= Storåsfestivalen =

Three-day music festival in Norway

Storåsfestivalen was a three-day annual music festival in Norway.

It was held between 2004 and 2012 in the village of Storås in Meldal Municipality, Trøndelag county. The founder was Sveinung Sundli of the band Gåte. From a starting point of 6,000 attendees over two days, the festival was expanded to three days in 2005 and saw 18,000 daily tickets being sold. In 2007 this had grown to 30,000 tickets. However, 2008 ended with a deficit of over 2 million kr. Amid fears of bankruptcy, Storås was replaced by festival founder Erlend Mogård-Larsen.

However, the deficit in 2009 was even larger, nearing 2.4 million kr. The festival went bankrupt. It was relaunched by Sveinung Sundli in 2010 with a much smaller budget, aiming for 2,700 sold tickets, and achieving slightly more than 3,000.

The 2011 edition was cancelled in mourning of the 2011 Norway attacks. After the 2012 edition, the organizers declared that the festival was put in "recovery position" until the public demand for a rock festival would improve.
