= John Neergaard =

Norwegian politician

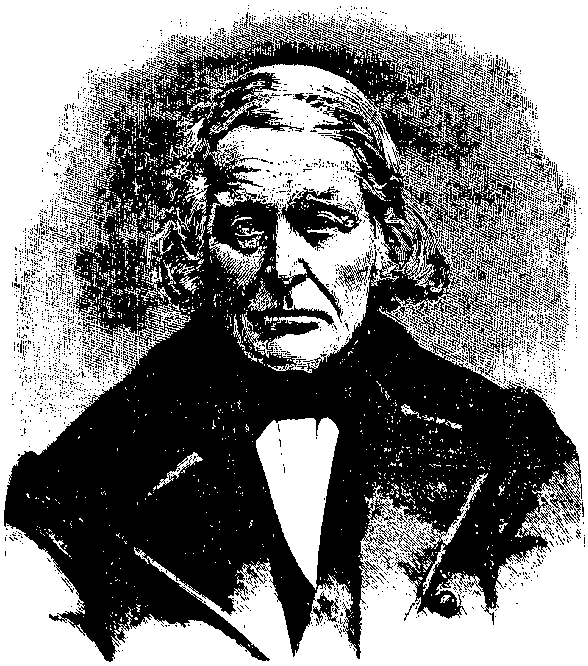
John Neergaard

John Gunderson Neergaard (11 November 1795 – 15 June 1885) was a Norwegian farmer, bailiff, and politician.

== Early life and family ==
Neergaard was born in the village of Romundstad in Rindal Municipality, the son of the farmer Gunder Jonson Neergaard (1737–1806) and Helga Johnsdotter Sande (1764–1850). He married Kirsten Iversdotter Dønheim (née Røste) in 1845.

== Career ==
In addition to being a farmer, Neergaard served as bailiff (lensmann) in Gjemnes from 1836 to 1854. He was elected to the Storting for nine periods, from 1827 to 1828, from 1833 to 1841, and from 1843 to 1854. He is particularly known for his agitation for farmers' interests. His publication from 1830, popularly called Ola-boka, was instrumental in doubling the number of farmers (from 21 to 45) elected at 1833 Parliamentary election. He is regarded as Father of Formannskapslovene that were passed in 1837, based on his draft from 1833. A monument to Neergaard stands next to County Road 341 near his birthplace.
