= Ingvald Svinsås-Lo =

Norwegian politician

Ingvald Svinsås-Lo (26 December 1897 – 1 June 1980) was a Norwegian politician for the Liberal Party.

He was born in Meldal Municipality in 1897. Svinsås-Lo was a member of municipal council of Meldal Municipality from 1928 to 1959, except for the years 1940 to 1945 during the German occupation of Norway, serving as mayor during the term 1934–1937. He chaired the countywide party chapter from 1938 to 1952. He was elected to the Norwegian Parliament from Sør-Trøndelag in 1945, but was not re-elected in 1949.

Outside politics, he worked as a farmer.
