= Svorksjøen =

Lake in Trøndelag, Norway

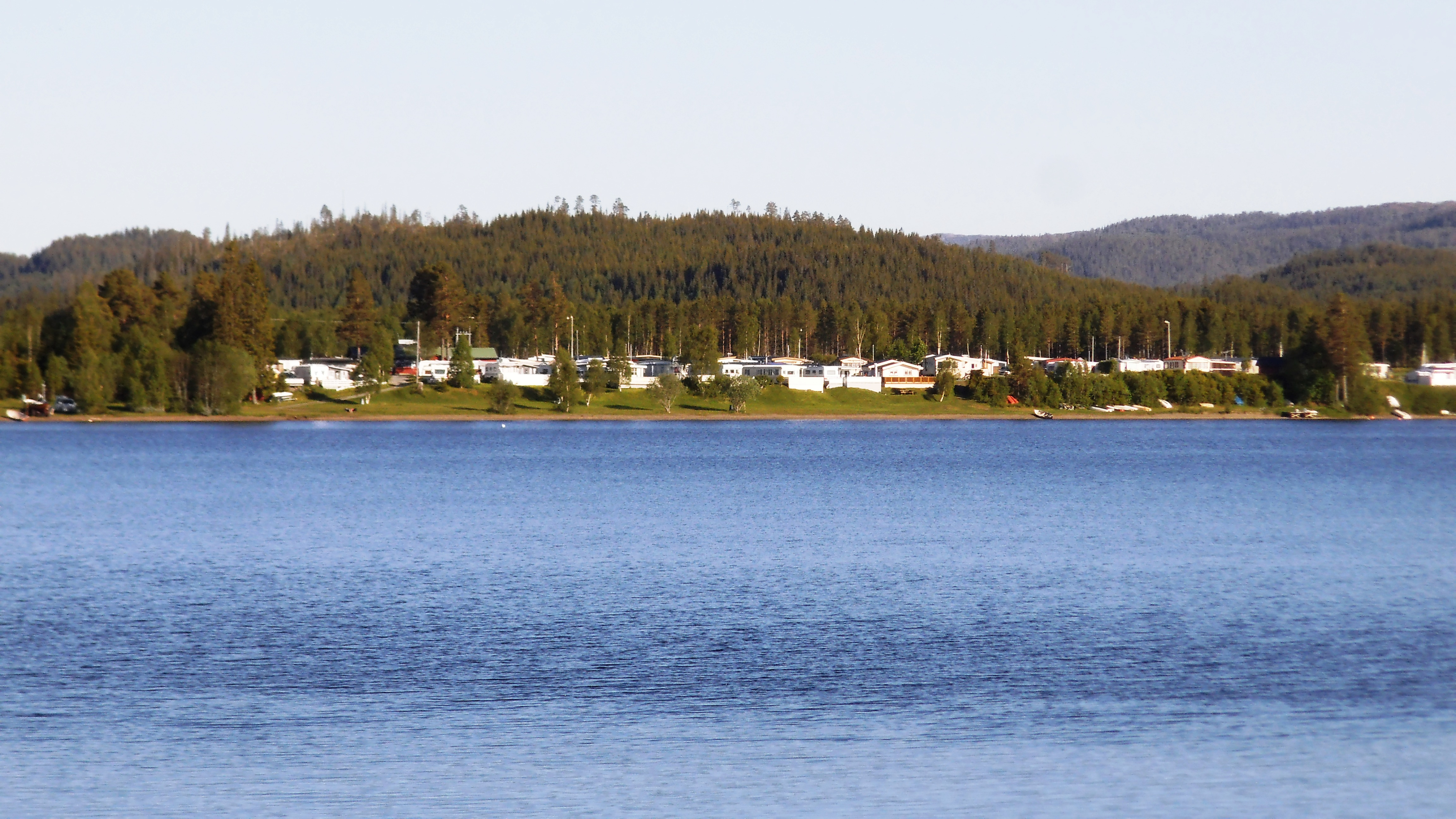
- Campgrounds along the lake shore
- Interactive map of the lake
- Location: Trøndelag, Norway
- Coordinates: 63.1335°N 09.8991°E
- Basin countries: Norway
- Max. length: 4 kilometres (2.5 mi)
- Max. width: 1.5 kilometres (0.93 mi)
- Surface area: 3.55 km^{2} (1.37 sq mi)
- Shore length^{1}: 20 kilometres (12 mi)
- Surface elevation: 237 metres (778 ft)
- References: NVE
- ^{1} Shore length is not a well-defined measure.

Svorksjøen is a lake in Trøndelag county, Norway. The 3.55-square-kilometre (1.37 sq mi) lake lies on the border of Orkland Municipality and Melhus Municipality. The lake lies about 6 kilometres (3.7 mi) east of the village of Svorkmo and about 10 kilometres (6.2 mi) southwest of the village of Korsvegen.

The water flows out of the lake into the river Svorka which in turn flows into the river Orkla, and the flow between the lake and Svorka is called Sagelva. According to a less common opinion, Svorka starts from Svorksjøen (making Sagelva the upper part of Svorka), meeting with Trivja and running into Orkla.

== See also ==
- List of lakes in Norway
