= Thorvald Heggem =

Norwegian skier

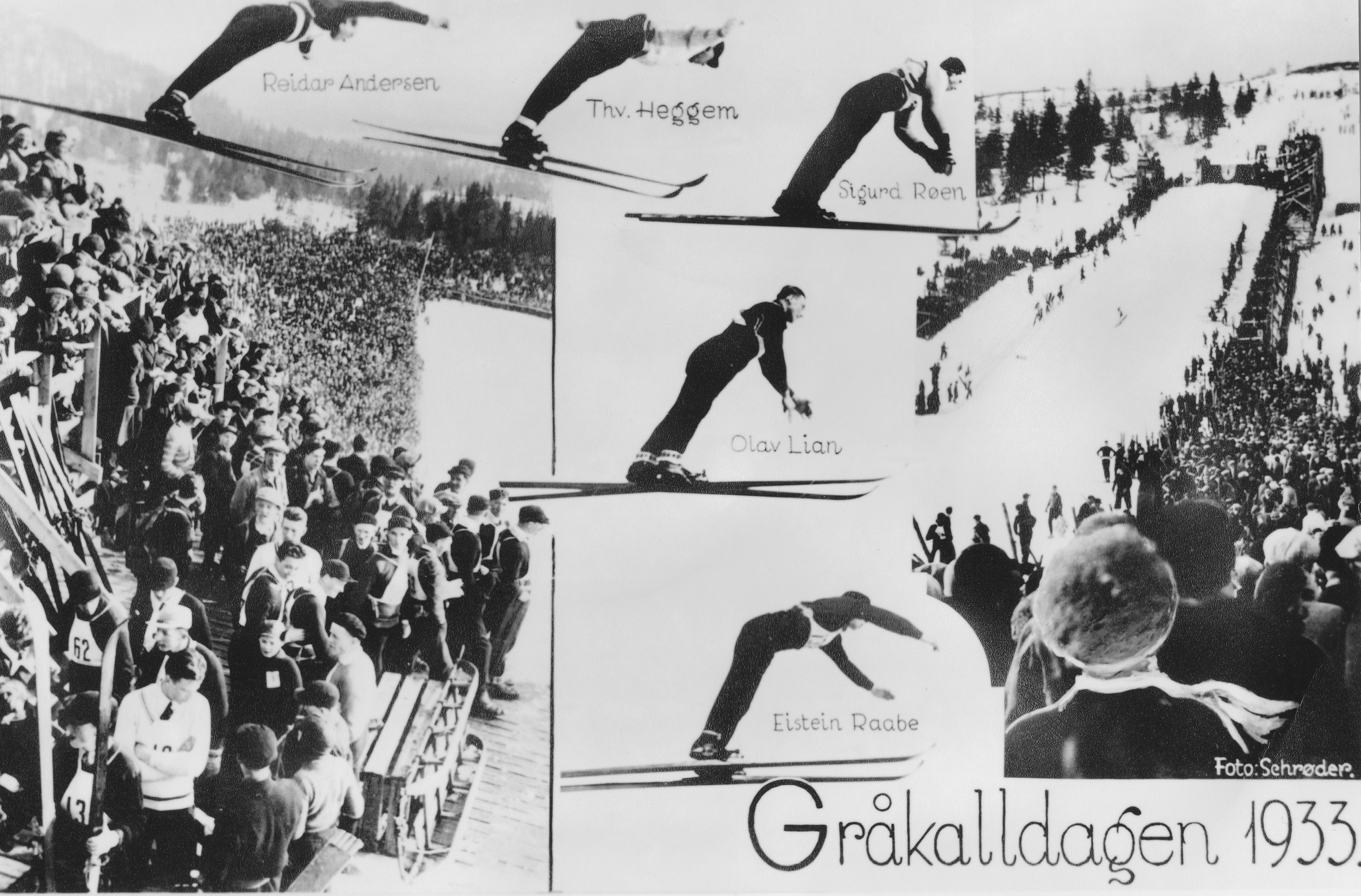
Gråkall competition, 1933. Thorvald Heggem at top center.

Thorvald Heggem (November 13, 1907 – June 30, 1976) was a Norwegian Nordic combined skier and cross country skier. He won the bronze medal in Nordic combined skiing in the Norway Cup national skiing championship in 1936.

Heggem was born in Rindal Municipality. In addition to his Norway Cup placing, Heggem also had a number of other good placings in the national championship and other major races. Among other achievements, he placed 5th in the combined, 6th in the 30 km, and 7th in the 17 km in the 1937 Norway Cup national skiing championship. At the Holmenkollen Ski Festival he was 5th in the combined in 1935 and 6th in 1938, and he took 5th in the 17 km in 1933. At the Gråkall Ski Jumping Hill he won the combined and took the Royal Cup in 1929, 1933, and 1937, and he also won the 30 km in 1933 and 1937, and the 17 km in 1937. He was German champion in combined and French champion in combined and 17 km, all in 1938. He also won the Royal Cup in combined at the Trønder Race in 1936.

Thorvald Heggem represented the club IL Rindøl until 1932, the Orkanger IF until 1945, and the Løkken IF.
