= Meldal (village) =

Village in Orkland Municipality, Norway

Meldal Meldal Sentrum
- Village
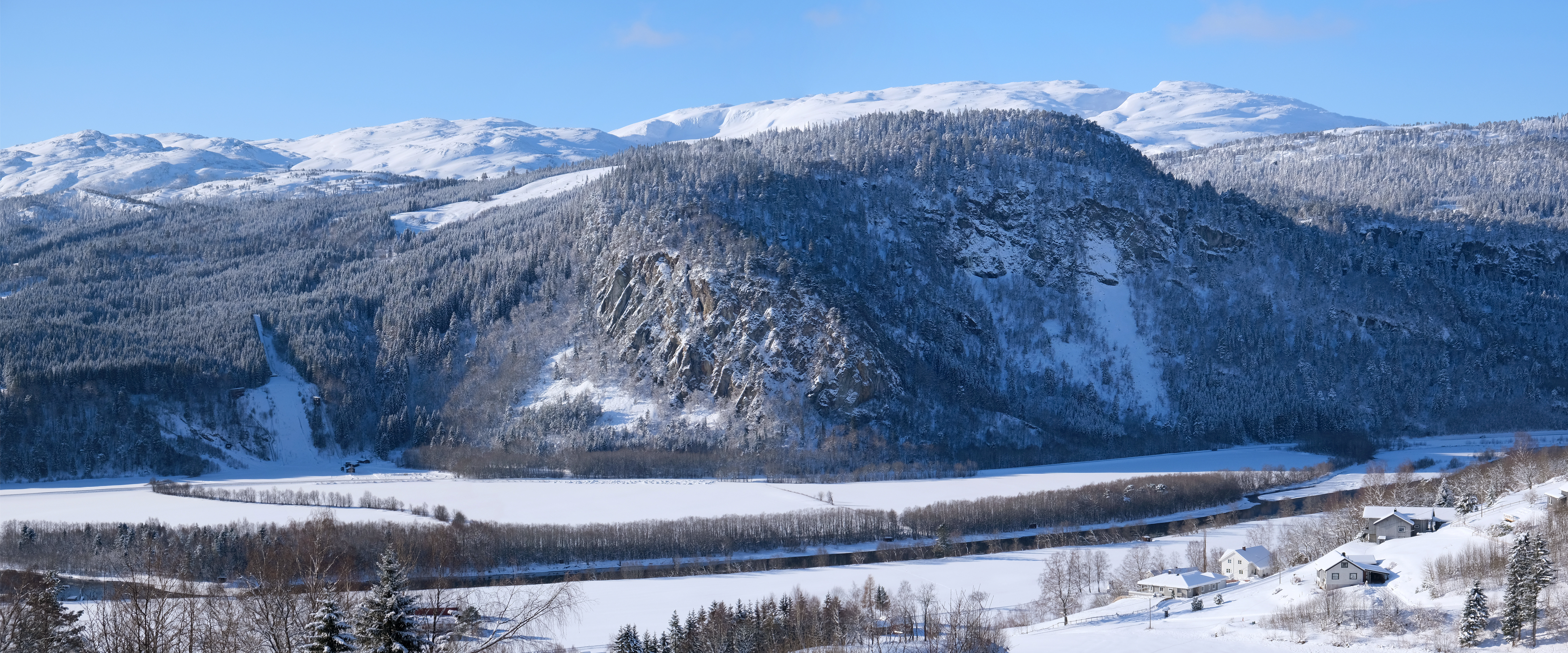
- Orkla river in Meldal
- Interactive map of Meldal
- Location within Trøndelag Location within Norway
- Coordinates: 63.0472°N 09.7139°E
- Country: Norway
- Region: Central Norway
- County: Trøndelag
- District: Orkdalen
- Municipality: Orkland Municipality

Area
  - Total: 0.8 km^{2} (0.31 sq mi)
- Elevation: 143 m (469 ft)

Population (2024)
  - Total: 628
  - Density: 785/km^{2} (2,030/sq mi)
- Demonym(s): meldaling, meddaling,
- Time zone: UTC+01:00 (CET)
  - Summer (DST): UTC+02:00 (CEST)
- Post Code: 7336 Meldal

Meldal is a village in Orkland Municipality in Trøndelag county, Norway. The village is located in the Orkdalen valley, along the river Orkla. The village of Å lies about 8 kilometres (5.0 mi) to the south, the village of Løkken Verk lies about 10 kilometres (6.2 mi) to the north, and the village of Storås lies about 8 kilometres (5.0 mi) to the northwest.

The 0.8-square-kilometre (200-acre) village has a population (2024) of 628 and a population density of 785 inhabitants per square kilometre (2,030/sq mi).

The village is the site of a school and preschool, and Meldal Church. There are many popular areas for outdoor activities in Meldal or close by, and there are more than 1,300 holiday cabins in the area. Agriculture is the main industry in the area around Meldal.

== History ==
The village was the administrative centre of the old Meldal Municipality which existed from 1838 until 2020 when it became part of the new Orkland Municipality.

=== Name ===
The village (originally the parish) is named Meldal (Old Norse: Meðaldalr) after its location in the Orkdalen valley. The first element is meðal which means "middle". The last element is dalr which means "valley" or "dale". Thus the name means "the middle of the valley". Historically, the name of the municipality was spelled Meldalen. On 3 November 1917, a royal resolution changed the spelling of the name of the municipality to Meldal, removing the definite form ending -en.

== Notable people ==
Notable people that were born or lived in Meldal (Norwegian: Meldalinger) include:

- Edvarda Lie (1910–1963), an artist
- Jan Egil Storholt (born 1949), a speed skater and Olympic champion
