= Romundstad, Trøndelag =

Village in Rindal Municipality, Norway

Romundstad
- Village
- Interactive map of Romundstad
- Location within Trøndelag Location within Norway
- Coordinates: 63.02618°N 9.31948°E
- Country: Norway
- Region: Central Norway
- County: Trøndelag
- District: Orkdalen
- Municipality: Rindal Municipality
- Elevation: 277 m (909 ft)
- Time zone: UTC+01:00 (CET)
  - Summer (DST): UTC+02:00 (CEST)
- Post Code: 6657 Rindal

Romundstad is a village and basic statistical unit (grunnkrets) in Rindal Municipality in Trøndelag county, Norway. The settlement lies along the Rinda River and Norwegian County Road 341, also known as Romundstadbygdvegen (Romundstad Village Road). It has an elevation of 269 meters (883 ft). It consists of several farms, including the Flålia, Heggem, Hegglund, Nerbu, Nergård, and Romundstad farms.

== Name ==
The settlement was attested as Romundsta in 1559 (and as Rømundsta in 1590 and Roemundstad in 1643, among other names). The original name is reconstructed as the compound word *Rómundarstaðir which comes from Rómundr (a masculine name) and staðir which means 'farmstead' or 'dwelling'.

== Notable people ==
Notable people that were born or lived in Romundstad include:

- John Neergaard (1795–1885), farmer, bailiff, and politician
