= Bjørnli =

Village in Orkland Municipality, Norway

- Village
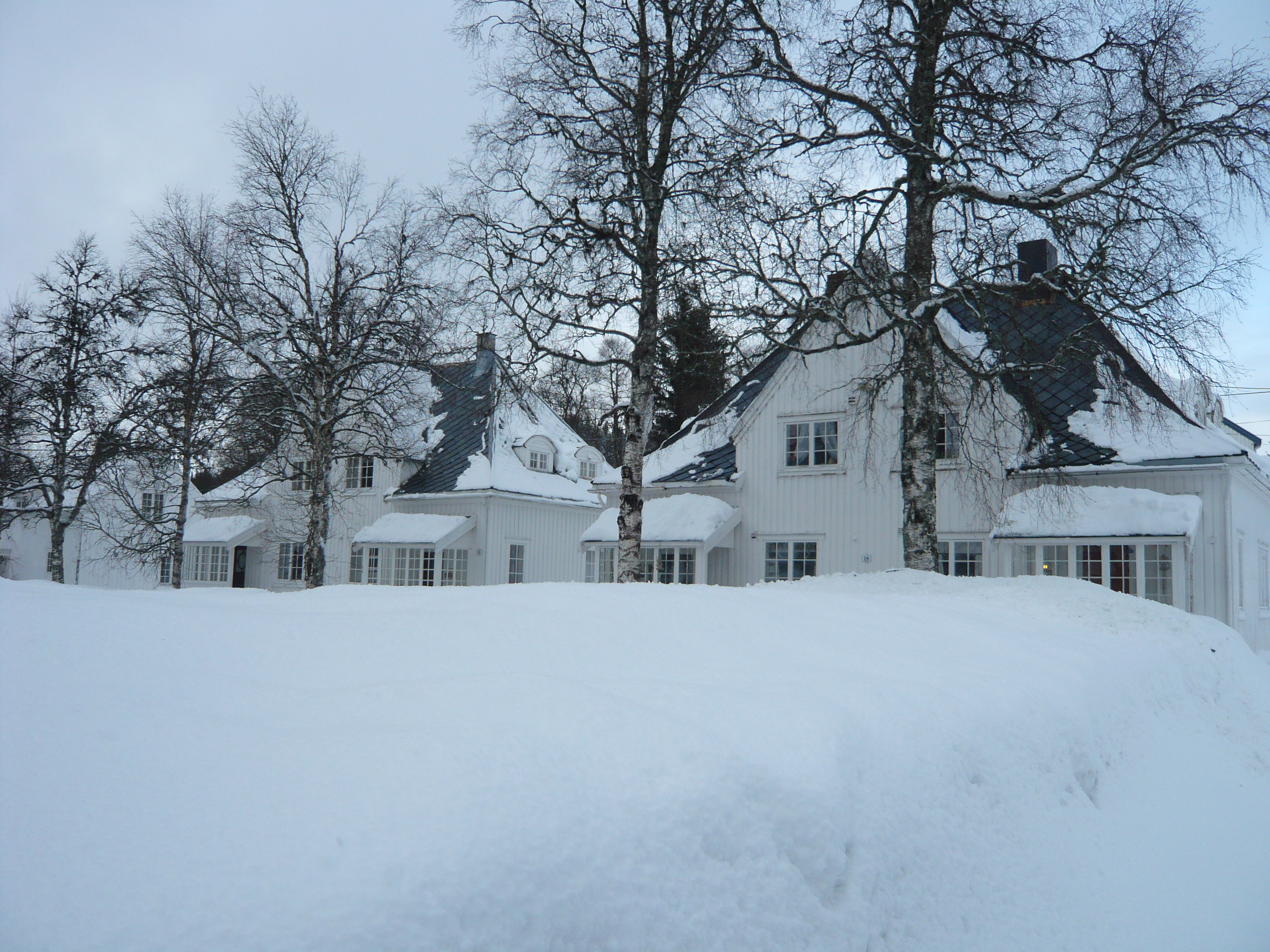
- Homes at Torvet in Bjørnli Haveby
- Interactive map of Bjørnli
- Location within Trøndelag Location within Norway
- Coordinates: 63.1301°N 09.6710°E
- Country: Norway
- Region: Central Norway
- County: Trøndelag
- District: Orkdalen
- Municipality: Orkland Municipality

Area
  - Total: 0.44 km^{2} (0.17 sq mi)
- Elevation: 305 m (1,001 ft)

Population (2012)
  - Total: 279
  - Density: 634/km^{2} (1,640/sq mi)
- Time zone: UTC+01:00 (CET)
  - Summer (DST): UTC+02:00 (CEST)
- Post Code: 7332 Løkken Verk

Bjørnli is a village in Orkland Municipality in Trøndelag county, Norway. It is located just east of the Orkla River about 2 kilometres (1.2 mi) west of the village of Løkken Verk and about 5 kilometres (3.1 mi) northeast of the village of Storås. The Løkken Church is located on the east side of the village, between Løkken Verk and Bjørnli.

The 0.44-square-kilometre (110-acre) village had a population (2012) of 279 and a population density of 634 inhabitants per square kilometre (1,640/sq mi). Since 2012, the population and area data for this village area has not been separately tracked by Statistics Norway.
