= Ola T. Heggem =

Norwegian politician

Ola T. Heggem (born 13 May 1952) is a Norwegian farmer and politician for the Centre Party.

He was born in Rindal Municipality as a son of farmers. After finishing commerce school in 1969, he attended Skjetlein Agricultural School from 1969 to 1971 and 1973 to 1974. After working in the municipality and the company Troll-Ski, he has been a farmer since 1980.

On the local level, Heggem was a member of the municipal council of Rindal Municipality from 1987 to 2005, serving as mayor since 1991. From 2003 to 2005 he was also a member of Møre og Romsdal county council. From 1999 to 2005 he was a member of the county board of agriculture. He chaired his local party chapter from 1998 to 2000, his county party chapter from 2000 to 2004, and was a central board member of the Centre Party from 2005 to 2007.

He served as a deputy representative to the Parliament of Norway from Møre og Romsdal during the term 2001–2005. He met during 123 days of the parliamentary session. From 2005 to September 2011 he was a State Secretary in the Ministry of Agriculture and Food, as a part of Stoltenberg's Second Cabinet.

He chaired Rindal IL from 1981 to 1985, and was a board member of the district skiing association from 1982 to 1991 as well as a working committee member of the Norwegian Ski Federation from 1993 to 1995. He has also been an election committee member of Tine and control committee member of Prior, both in central Norway.
