= Rindal Church =

Church in Trøndelag, Norway

- Rindal kyrkje
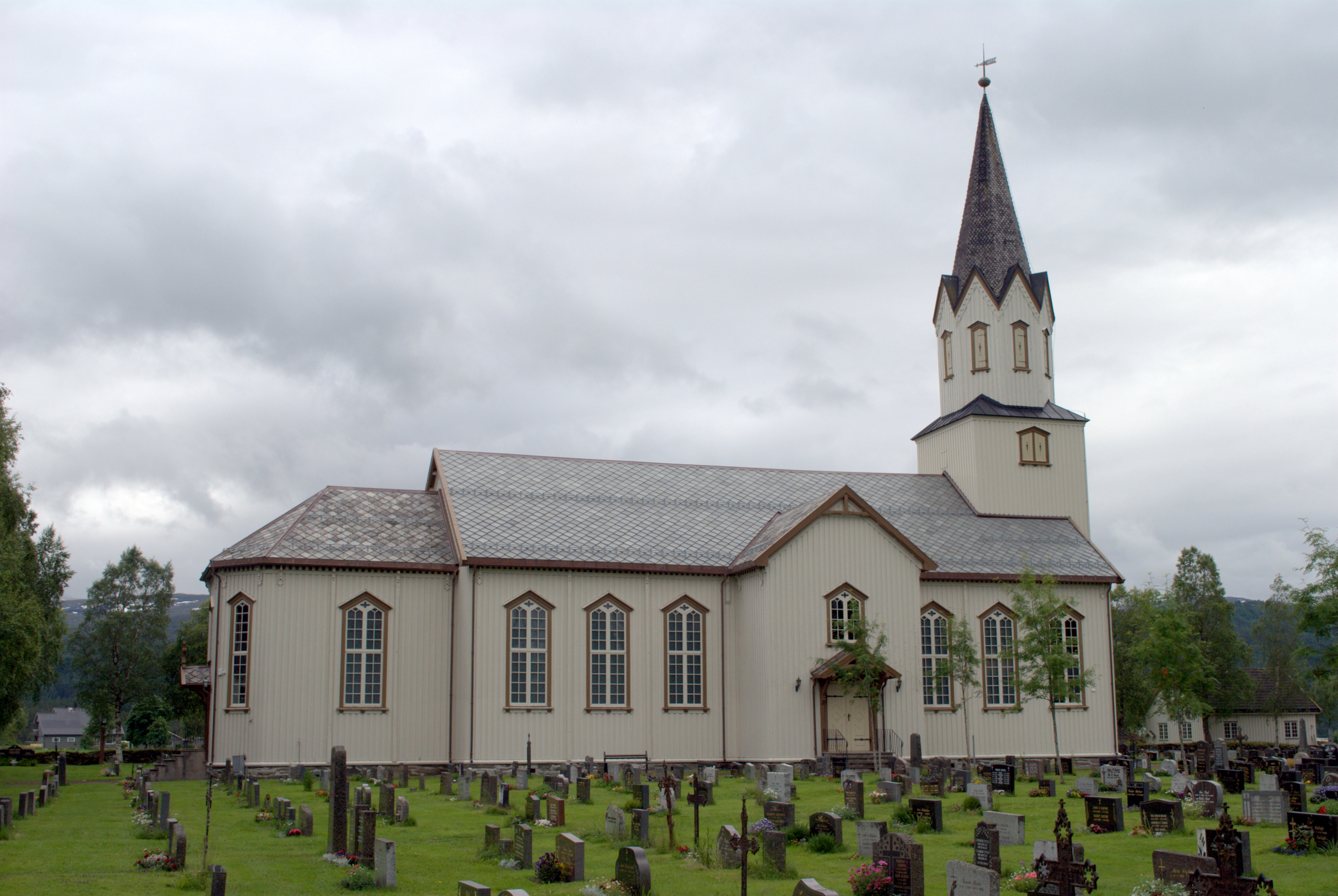
- View of the church Credit: Cato Edvardsen
- Rindal Church
- 63.051521944°N 9.20967578°E
- Location: Rindal Municipality, Trøndelag
- Country: Norway
- Denomination: Church of Norway
- Churchmanship: Evangelical Lutheran

History
- Status: Parish church
- Founded: 14th century
- Consecrated: 2 Dec 1874

Architecture
- Functional status: Active
- Architect(s): J.M. Helgesen and Jacob Wilhelm Nordan
- Architectural type: Cruciform
- Completed: 1874 (152 years ago)

Specifications
- Capacity: 420
- Materials: Wood

Administration
- Diocese: Nidaros bispedømme
- Deanery: Orkdal prosti
- Parish: Rindal
- Norwegian Cultural Heritage Site
- Type: Church
- Status: Not protected
- ID: 85293

Rindal Church (Norwegian: Rindal kyrkje) is a parish church of the Church of Norway in Rindal Municipality in Trøndelag county, Norway. It is located in the village of Rindal. It is one of the churches for the Rindal parish which is part of the Orkdal prosti (deanery) in the Diocese of Nidaros. The white, wooden church was built in a cruciform style in 1874 by the architects Johan Martin Helgesen and Jacob Wilhelm Nordan. The church seats about 420 people.

== History ==
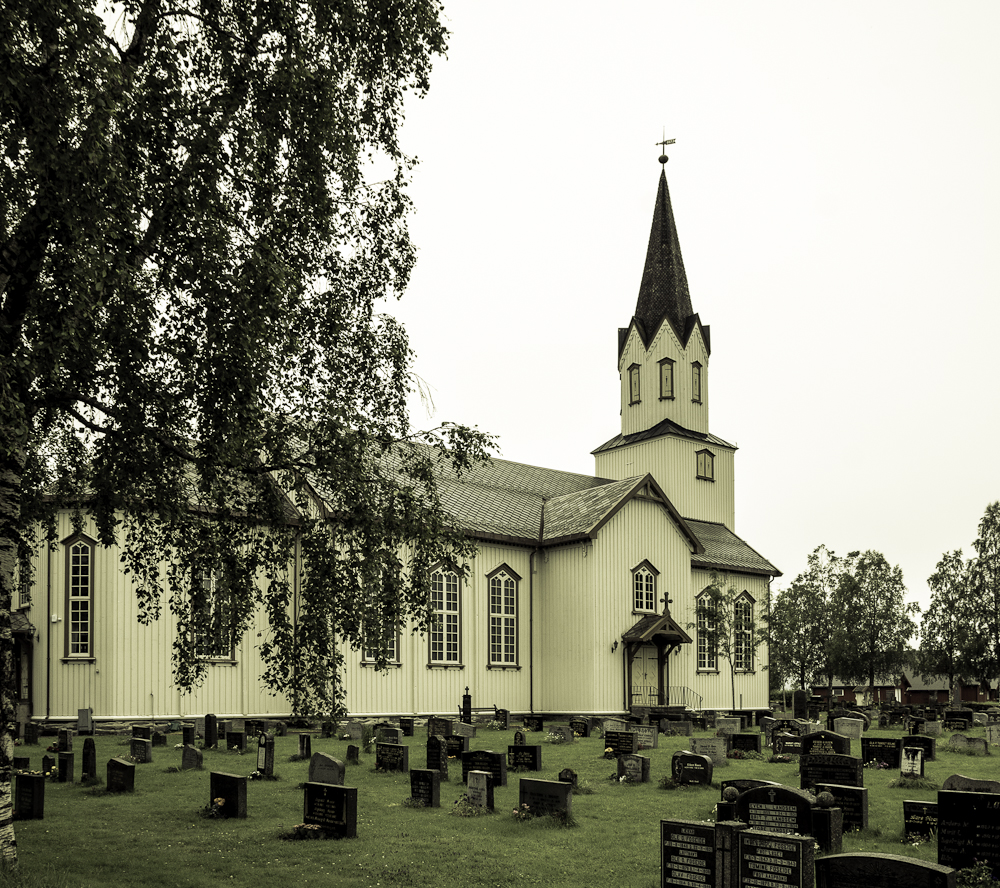
Exterior view of the church Credit: Henny Stokseth

The earliest existing historical records of the church date back to the year 1548, but the church was not new that year. The first church in Rindal was a stave church and it was located about 50 metres (160 ft) north of the present church site. The church may have been first built during the 14th century. At some point, the church was enlarged by adding a transept to make it a cruciform design. In 1649, one of the cross-arms of the transept was rebuilt and a new tower was built on the roof over the nave.

In 1689, the old, medieval church was torn down and a new church was built on the same site. The new church was a log building with a cruciform design. Despite being completed that year, the new church was not consecrated until 1693. This new church inherited the pulpit and baptismal font from the old stave church.

Around 1870, it was found necessary to build a new church since the old one was small, cold, and in poor condition. Plans were made for the new building and a new site, about 50 metres (160 ft) south of the old church site was chosen. The old church was torn down in 1873 and its materials were sold. Work began in the winter of 1872–1873. The new church was designed by Johan Martin Helgesen who had input from the national church architect, Jacob Wilhelm Nordan. The lead builder was Ole Olsen Scheistrøen. The new building was completed on the new site in 1874 and it was consecrated on 2 December 1874. The church was restored in 1935 and again in 1990. In 2014, the tower caught fire, but it was extinguished before the rest of the building caught fire.

Historically, the parish of Rindal was part of the Indre Nordmøre prosti (deanery) in the Diocese of Møre. On 1 January 2020, the parish of Rindal was transferred to the Orkdal prosti (deanery) in the Diocese of Nidaros. This transfer is a result of Rindal Municipality being transferred from Møre og Romsdal county to Trøndelag county on 1 January 2019.

== See also ==
- List of churches in Nidaros
