= Rindal (village) =

Village in Rindal Municipality, Norway

- Village
- Interactive map of Rindal
- Location within Trøndelag Location within Norway
- Coordinates: 63.05554°N 9.21156°E
- Country: Norway
- Region: Central Norway
- County: Trøndelag
- District: Orkdalen
- Municipality: RindalMunicipality

Area
  - Total: 0.88 km^{2} (0.34 sq mi)
- Elevation: 146 m (479 ft)

Population (2024)
  - Total: 725
  - Density: 824/km^{2} (2,130/sq mi)
- Time zone: UTC+01:00 (CET)
  - Summer (DST): UTC+02:00 (CEST)
- Post Code: 6657 Rindal

Rindal is the administrative centre of Rindal Municipality in Trøndelag county, Norway. The village lies along the river Surna, about 30 kilometres (19 mi) east of the village of Surnadalsøra and about 90 kilometres (56 mi) southwest of the city of Trondheim. County Road 341 branches off from County Road 340 in the village.

The 0.88-square-kilometre (220-acre) village has a population (2024) of 725 and a population density of 824 inhabitants per square kilometre (2,130/sq mi). Over half of the population of the municipality live in the village of Rindal and its surrounding suburban areas.

The village has retail and service industries, other industries, public administration and services, general industry (especially wood and food processing), and a hotel. Several timber companies are located in Rindal. There are several stores as well as the historic Rindal Church in the center of the village.
