= Meldal Church =

Church in Trøndelag, Norway

- Meldal kirke
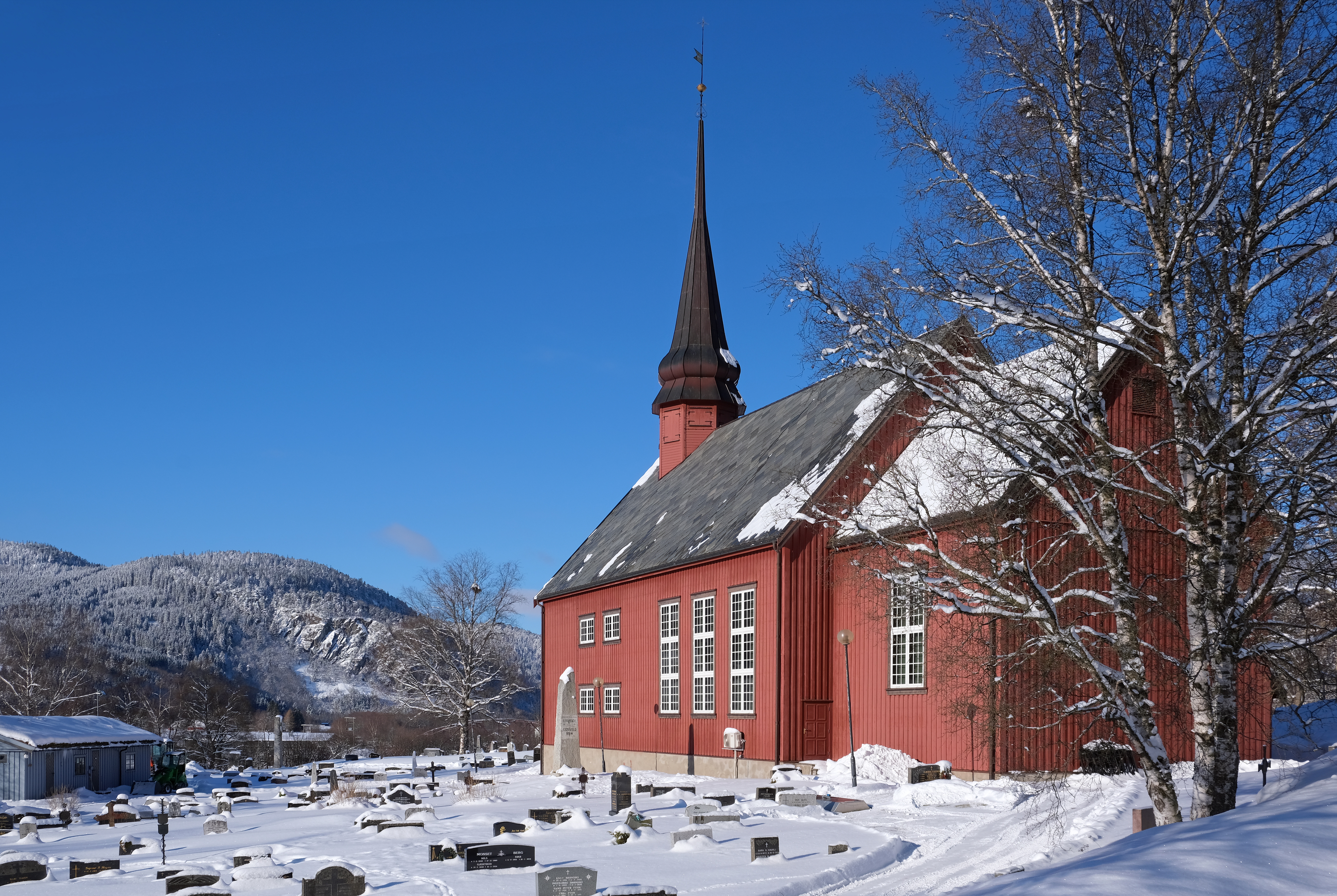
- View of the church
- Meldal Church
- 63.0451°N 9.7193°E
- Location: Orkland Municipality, Trøndelag
- Country: Norway
- Denomination: Church of Norway
- Churchmanship: Evangelical Lutheran

History
- Former name: Grøtte kirke
- Status: Parish church
- Founded: 13th century
- Consecrated: 1988

Architecture
- Functional status: Active
- Architect: John Mosand
- Architectural type: Long church
- Completed: 1988 (38 years ago)

Specifications
- Capacity: 375
- Materials: Wood

Administration
- Diocese: Nidaros bispedømme
- Deanery: Orkdal prosti
- Parish: Meldal
- Norwegian Cultural Heritage Site
- Type: Church
- Status: Not protected
- ID: 84935

Meldal Church (Norwegian: Meldal kirke) is a parish church of the Church of Norway in Orkland Municipality in Trøndelag county, Norway. It is located in the village of Meldal. It is the church for the Meldal parish which is part of the Orkdal prosti (deanery) in the Diocese of Nidaros. The red, concrete and wood church was built in a long church style in 1988 by the architect John Mosand. The church seats about 375 people.

== History ==
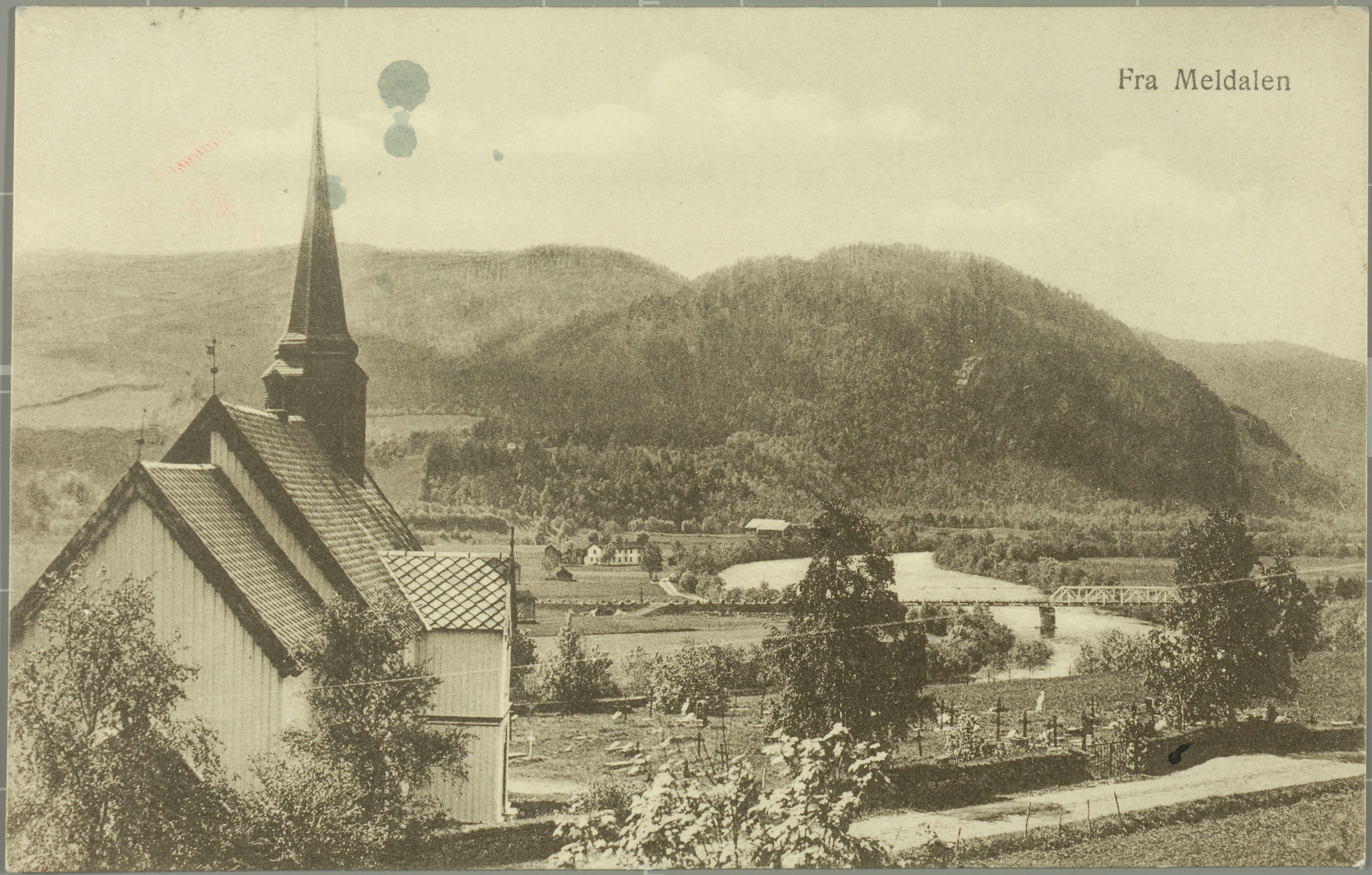
View of the church (circa 1920s)

The earliest existing historical records of the church date back to the year 1310, but the church was not new that year. The first church in Meldal was likely built in the 13th century and it may have been an important county church since it had been built on the Grøtte farm in Meldal which was a Crown Estate. The building may have been a stave church. Historically, the church was known as the Grøtte Church. The church was torn down in 1650 and replaced with a new church on the same site. The new church was built by the architect Ole Jonsen Hindrum. It was a long church made out of logs. It was consecrated on 11 October 1650.

In 1814, this church served as an election church (Norwegian: valgkirke). Together with more than 300 other parish churches across Norway, it was a polling station for elections to the 1814 Norwegian Constituent Assembly which wrote the Constitution of Norway. This was Norway's first national elections. Each church parish was a constituency that elected people called "electors" who later met together in each county to elect the representatives for the assembly that was to meet at Eidsvoll Manor later that year.

The church tower was rebuilt in 1838 and the new tower was somewhat shorter than the original. In 1908, the church was painted white on the outside, before it regained its original red color in a restoration led by John Tverdahl in 1930–1934.

On 16 June 1981, the old church burned to the ground. It was decided to rebuild the church using the same design from 1651, rather than building a more modern building. The plans did call for a few alterations from the original, however. The new church is slightly larger than the original. Also, it is a concrete building that is clad in wood to make it look like the original. The new church was completed in 1988.

== See also ==
- List of churches in Nidaros
