= Storås =

Village in Orkland Municipality, Norway

- Village
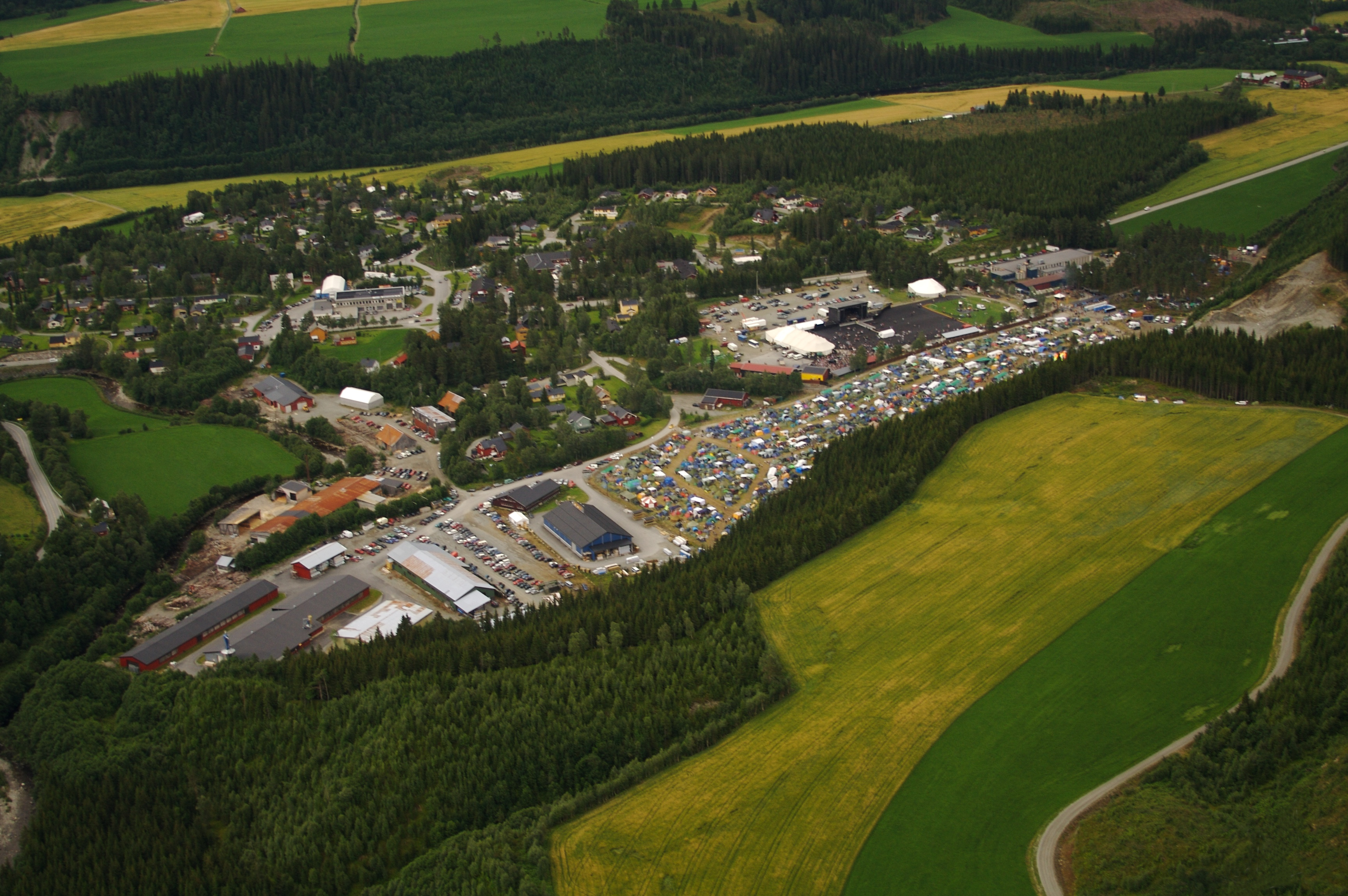
- View of the village during the Storås Festival
- Interactive map of Storås
- Location within Trøndelag Location within Norway
- Coordinates: 63.0959°N 09.5977°E
- Country: Norway
- Region: Central Norway
- County: Trøndelag
- District: Orkdalen
- Municipality: Orkland Municipality

Area
  - Total: 0.41 km^{2} (0.16 sq mi)
- Elevation: 124 m (407 ft)

Population (2024)
  - Total: 305
  - Density: 744/km^{2} (1,930/sq mi)
- Time zone: UTC+01:00 (CET)
  - Summer (DST): UTC+02:00 (CEST)
- Post Code: 7334 Storås

Storås is a village in Orkland Municipality in Trøndelag county, Norway. It is located along the Orkla River, about 8 kilometres (5.0 mi) northwest of the village of Meldal. For most Norwegians, Storås is best known for hosting the annual festival called Storåsfestivalen since 2004. The nearest major city is Trondheim.

The 0.41-square-kilometre (100-acre) village has a population (2024) of 305, and a population density of 744 inhabitants per square kilometre (1,930/sq mi).
