= Rindal Municipality =

Municipality in Trøndelag, Norway

Rindal Municipality Rindal kommune
- Municipality
- Rindalen herred (historic name)
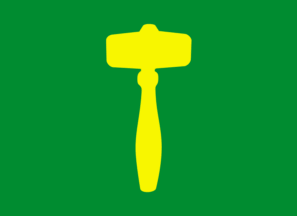
- Flag Coat of arms

- Trøndelag within Norway

- Rindal within Trøndelag
- Coordinates: 63°02′32″N 09°17′22″E
- Country: Norway
- County: Trøndelag
- District: Orkdalen
- Established: 1858
  - Preceded by: Surnadal Municipality
- Administrative centre: Rindal

Government
  - Mayor (2023): Mildrid Kattem Aune (Sp)

Area
  - Total: 631.94 km^{2} (243.99 sq mi)
  - Land: 611.94 km^{2} (236.27 sq mi)
  - Water: 20 km^{2} (7.7 sq mi) 3.2%
  - Rank: #184 in Norway
- Highest elevation: 1,614.69 m (5,297.5 ft)

Population (2024)
  - Total: 1,958
  - Rank: #285 in Norway
  - Density: 3.1/km^{2} (8.0/sq mi)
  - Change (10 years): ▼ −4.3%
- Demonym: Rindaling

Official language
  - Norwegian form: Neutral
- Time zone: UTC+01:00 (CET)
  - Summer (DST): UTC+02:00 (CEST)
- ISO 3166 code: NO-5061
- Website: Official website

Rindal is a municipality in Trøndelag county, Norway. It is part of the Orkdalen region. The administrative centre is the village of Rindal. Other villages in the municipality include Tiset and Romundstad. The municipality centres on agriculture and forestry services.

The 632-square-kilometre (244 sq mi) municipality is the 184th largest by area out of the 357 municipalities in Norway. Rindal Municipality is the 285th most populous municipality in Norway with a population of 1,958. The municipality's population density is 3.1 inhabitants per square kilometre (8.0/sq mi) and its population has decreased by 4.3% over the previous 10-year period.

== General information ==
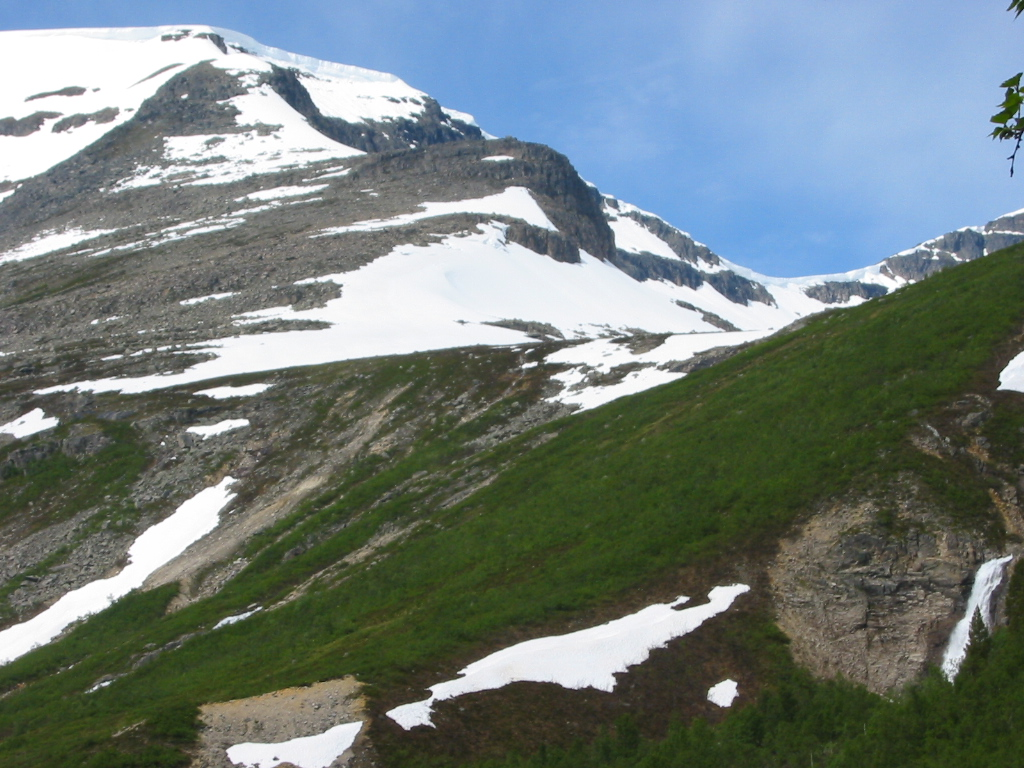
The mountain Trollhøtta

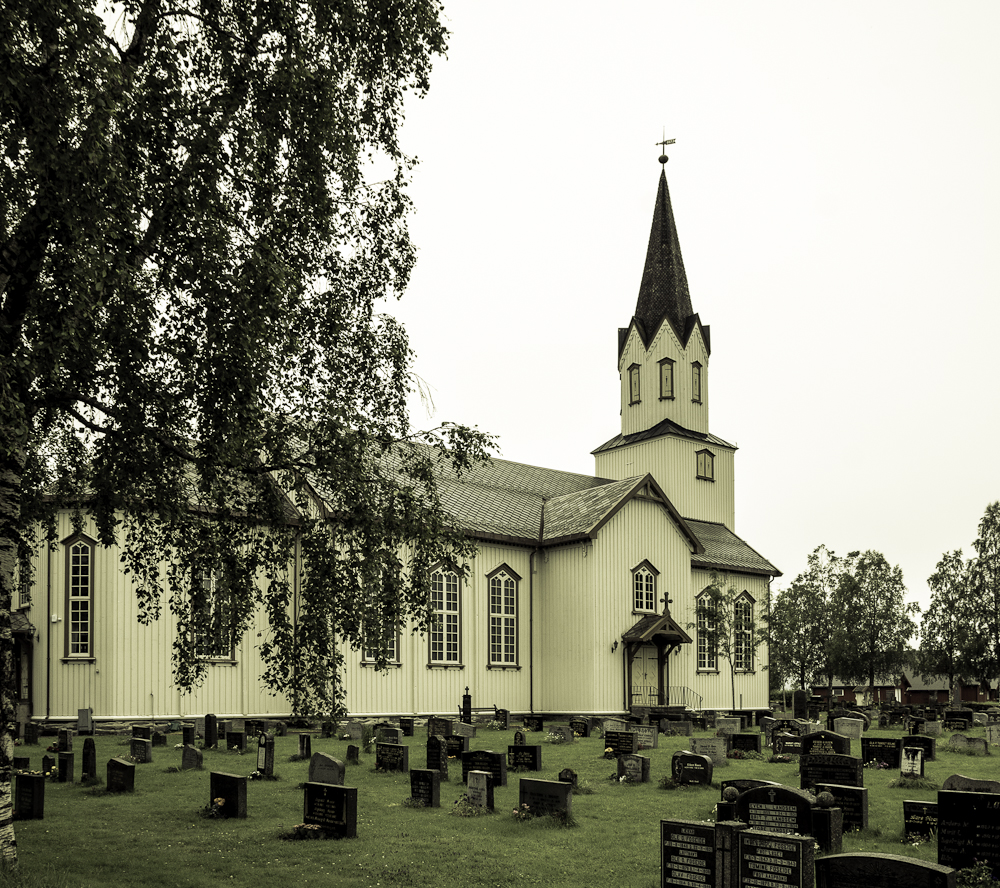
Rindal Church

The parish of Rindal was established as a municipality in 1858 when it was separated from Surnadal Municipality. It was originally located within Møre og Romsdal county. The initial population of Rindal Municipality was 2,684.

On 1 January 2008, the Fossdalen farm (population: 4) was transferred from Rindal Municipality (in Møre og Romsdal county) to Hemne Municipality (in Sør-Trøndelag county).

On 1 January 2019, Rindal Municipality was transferred from Møre og Romsdal county to Trøndelag county.

=== Name ===
The municipality (originally the parish) is named after the old Rindal farm (Old Norse: Rindudalr) since the first Rindal Church was built there. The first element is the genitive case of the river name Rinda which is derived from the verb rinna which means to "run" or "flow". The last element is dalr which means "valley" or "dale". Historically, the name of the municipality was spelled Rindalen. On 3 November 1917, a royal resolution changed the spelling of the name of the municipality to Rindal, removing the definite form ending -en.

=== Coat of arms ===
The coat of arms was granted on 20 January 1989. The official blazon is "Vert, a gavel Or" (Norwegian: I grønt en opprett gull klubbe). This means the arms have a green field (background) and the charge is a gavel. The gavel has a tincture of Or which means it is commonly colored yellow, but if it is made out of metal, then gold is used. The gavel is meant to symbolize John Neergaard, who is considered the father of municipal governments in Norway, (formannskapets far), who was from Rindal. He was responsible for pushing for local government reform which led to the approval of the Formannskapsdistrikt law in 1837. The arms were designed by Einar Skjervold. The municipal flag has the same design as the coat of arms.

=== Churches ===
The Church of Norway has one parish (sokn) within Rindal Municipality. It was historically part of the Indre Nordmøre prosti (deanery) in the Diocese of Møre. On 1 January 2020, the parish of Rindal was transferred to the Orkdal prosti (deanery) in the Diocese of Nidaros. This transfer was a result of Rindal Municipality being transferred from Møre og Romsdal county to Trøndelag county in 2019.

Churches in Rindal Municipality
Parish (sokn)	Church name	Location of the church	Year built
Rindal	Rindal Church	Rindal	1874
Rindal	Øvre Rindal Chapel	Tiset	1911

== Geography ==
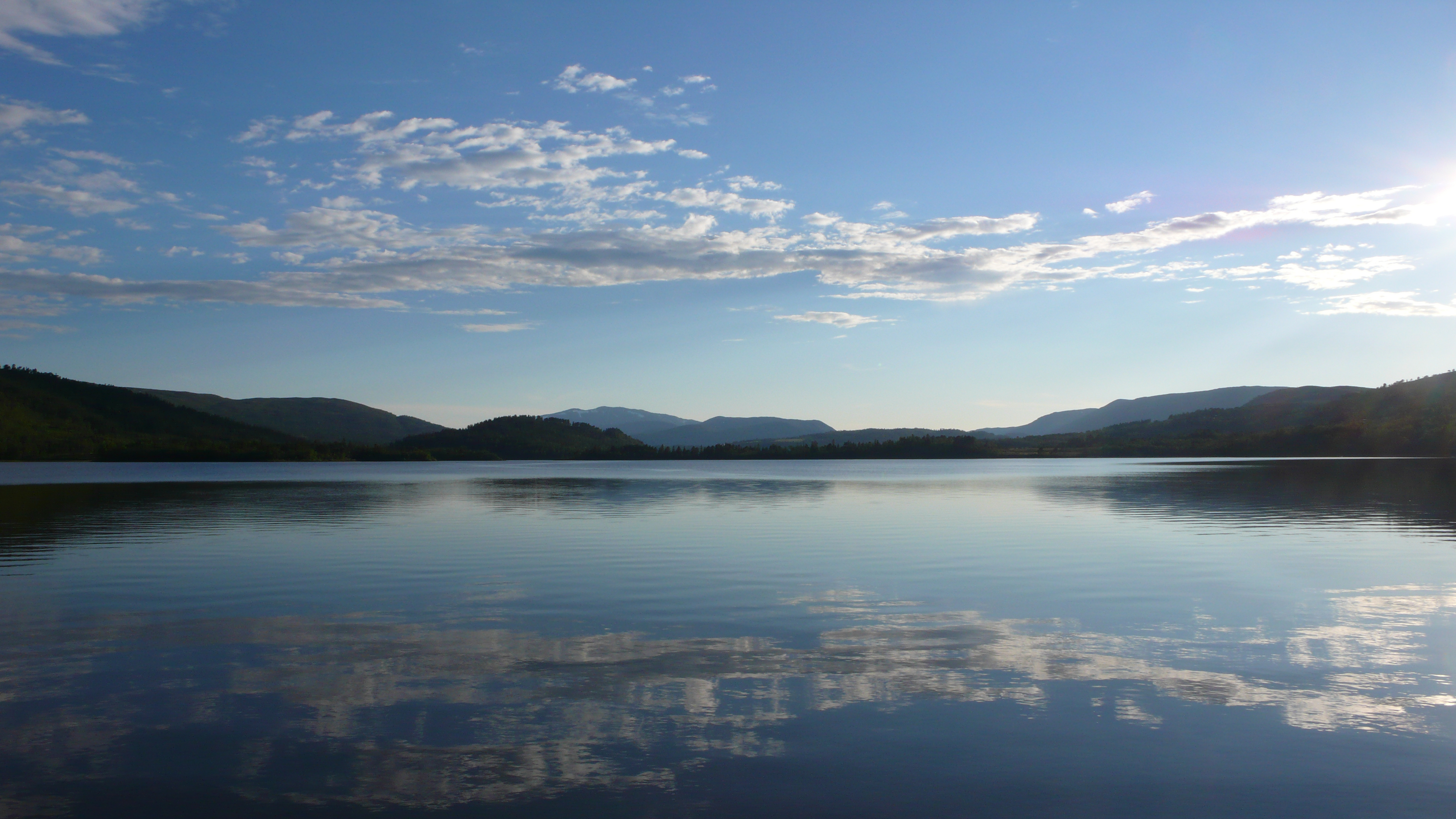
Lake Søvatnet near Søvassli

The municipality lies in the southwestern part of Trøndelag county, along the border with Møre og Romsdal county. Rindal Municipality was part of Møre og Romsdal county until 2019 and during that time, it was the only landlocked municipality in Møre og Romsdal. The lakes Foldsjøen and Gråsjøen lie along the border with Surnadal Municipality to the southwest. The large river Surna begins in Rindal Municipality at the confluence of the rivers Tiåa and Lomunda. The Trollheimen mountain range runs through southern Rindal. The highest point in the municipality is the 1,614.69-metre (5,297.5 ft) tall mountain Trollhøtta. The Grønkjølen Nature Reserve lies in the extreme northwest of the municipality.

Surnadal Municipality lies to the west (in Møre og Romsdal county), Heim Municipality lies to the north, Orkland Municipality lies to the east, Rennebu Municipality lies to the southeast, and Oppdal Municipality lies to the south.

== Government ==
Rindal Municipality is responsible for primary education (through 10th grade), outpatient health services, senior citizen services, welfare and other social services, zoning, economic development, and municipal roads and utilities. The municipality is governed by a municipal council of directly elected representatives. The mayor is indirectly elected by a vote of the municipal council. The municipality is under the jurisdiction of the Trøndelag District Court and the Frostating Court of Appeal. Waste management was from 1999 handled by the inter-municipal agency HAMOS Forvaltning. It merged into ReMidt in 2020.

=== Municipal council ===
The municipal council (Kommunestyre) of Rindal Municipality is made up of 17 representatives that are elected to four year terms. The tables below show the current and historical composition of the council by political party.

Rindal kommunestyre 2023–2027
Party name (in Norwegian)	Number of representatives
Labour Party (Arbeiderpartiet)	6
Conservative Party (Høyre)	2
Centre Party (Senterpartiet)	9
Total number of members:	17

Rindal kommunestyre 2019–2023
Party name (in Norwegian)	Number of representatives
Labour Party (Arbeiderpartiet)	8
Conservative Party (Høyre)	2
Centre Party (Senterpartiet)	7
Total number of members:	17

Rindal kommunestyre 2015–2019
Party name (in Norwegian)	Number of representatives
Labour Party (Arbeiderpartiet)	7
Conservative Party (Høyre)	2
Christian Democratic Party (Kristelig Folkeparti)	1
Centre Party (Senterpartiet)	7
Total number of members:	17

Rindal kommunestyre 2011–2015
Party name (in Norwegian)	Number of representatives
Labour Party (Arbeiderpartiet)	5
Conservative Party (Høyre)	1
Christian Democratic Party (Kristelig Folkeparti)	1
Centre Party (Senterpartiet)	10
Total number of members:	17

Rindal kommunestyre 2007–2011
Party name (in Norwegian)	Number of representatives
Labour Party (Arbeiderpartiet)	8
Conservative Party (Høyre)	1
Christian Democratic Party (Kristelig Folkeparti)	1
Centre Party (Senterpartiet)	7
Total number of members:	17

Rindal kommunestyre 2003–2007
Party name (in Norwegian)	Number of representatives
Labour Party (Arbeiderpartiet)	5
Conservative Party (Høyre)	2
Christian Democratic Party (Kristelig Folkeparti)	1
Centre Party (Senterpartiet)	9
Total number of members:	17

Rindal kommunestyre 1999–2003
Party name (in Norwegian)	Number of representatives
Labour Party (Arbeiderpartiet)	6
Conservative Party (Høyre)	3
Christian Democratic Party (Kristelig Folkeparti)	1
Centre Party (Senterpartiet)	7
Total number of members:	17

Rindal kommunestyre 1995–1999
Party name (in Norwegian)	Number of representatives
Labour Party (Arbeiderpartiet)	6
Conservative Party (Høyre)	1
Christian Democratic Party (Kristelig Folkeparti)	1
Centre Party (Senterpartiet)	9
Total number of members:	17

Rindal kommunestyre 1991–1995
Party name (in Norwegian)	Number of representatives
Labour Party (Arbeiderpartiet)	5
Conservative Party (Høyre)	2
Christian Democratic Party (Kristelig Folkeparti)	2
Centre Party (Senterpartiet)	8
Total number of members:	17

Rindal kommunestyre 1987–1991
Party name (in Norwegian)	Number of representatives
Labour Party (Arbeiderpartiet)	6
Conservative Party (Høyre)	2
Christian Democratic Party (Kristelig Folkeparti)	2
Centre Party (Senterpartiet)	7
Total number of members:	17

Rindal kommunestyre 1983–1987
Party name (in Norwegian)	Number of representatives
Labour Party (Arbeiderpartiet)	7
Conservative Party (Høyre)	2
Christian Democratic Party (Kristelig Folkeparti)	2
Centre Party (Senterpartiet)	6
Total number of members:	17

Rindal kommunestyre 1979–1983
Party name (in Norwegian)	Number of representatives
Labour Party (Arbeiderpartiet)	5
Conservative Party (Høyre)	2
Christian Democratic Party (Kristelig Folkeparti)	2
Centre Party (Senterpartiet)	8
Total number of members:	17

Rindal kommunestyre 1975–1979
Party name (in Norwegian)	Number of representatives
Labour Party (Arbeiderpartiet)	6
Christian Democratic Party (Kristelig Folkeparti)	2
Centre Party (Senterpartiet)	7
Non-party list (Upolitisk Liste)	2
Total number of members:	17

Rindal kommunestyre 1971–1975
Party name (in Norwegian)	Number of representatives
Labour Party (Arbeiderpartiet)	4
Christian Democratic Party (Kristelig Folkeparti)	2
Centre Party (Senterpartiet)	5
Local List(s) (Lokale lister)	6
Total number of members:	17

Rindal kommunestyre 1967–1971
Party name (in Norwegian)	Number of representatives
Labour Party (Arbeiderpartiet)	5
Christian Democratic Party (Kristelig Folkeparti)	3
Centre Party (Senterpartiet)	6
Local List(s) (Lokale lister)	3
Total number of members:	17

Rindal kommunestyre 1963–1967
Party name (in Norwegian)	Number of representatives
Labour Party (Arbeiderpartiet)	7
Christian Democratic Party (Kristelig Folkeparti)	3
Centre Party (Senterpartiet)	7
Total number of members:	17

Rindal herredsstyre 1959–1963
Party name (in Norwegian)	Number of representatives
Labour Party (Arbeiderpartiet)	7
Christian Democratic Party (Kristelig Folkeparti)	2
Centre Party (Senterpartiet)	8
Total number of members:	17

Rindal herredsstyre 1955–1959
Party name (in Norwegian)	Number of representatives
Labour Party (Arbeiderpartiet)	7
Christian Democratic Party (Kristelig Folkeparti)	3
Farmers' Party (Bondepartiet)	7
Total number of members:	17

Rindal herredsstyre 1951–1955
Party name (in Norwegian)	Number of representatives
Labour Party (Arbeiderpartiet)	6
Christian Democratic Party (Kristelig Folkeparti)	4
Farmers' Party (Bondepartiet)	6
Total number of members:	16

Rindal herredsstyre 1947–1951
Party name (in Norwegian)	Number of representatives
Labour Party (Arbeiderpartiet)	6
Christian Democratic Party (Kristelig Folkeparti)	3
Farmers' Party (Bondepartiet)	6
Liberal Party (Venstre)	1
Total number of members:	16

Rindal herredsstyre 1945–1947
Party name (in Norwegian)	Number of representatives
Labour Party (Arbeiderpartiet)	7
Christian Democratic Party (Kristelig Folkeparti)	3
Farmers' Party (Bondepartiet)	4
Liberal Party (Venstre)	2
Total number of members:	16

Rindal herredsstyre 1937–1941*
Party name (in Norwegian)	Number of representatives
Labour Party (Arbeiderpartiet)	6
Joint List(s) of Non-Socialist Parties (Borgerlige Felleslister)	10
Total number of members:	16
Note: Due to the German occupation of Norway during World War II, no elections were held for new municipal councils until after the war ended in 1945.

=== Mayors ===
The mayor (Norwegian: ordfører) of Rindal Municipality is the political leader of the municipality and the chairperson of the municipal council. Here is a list of people who have held this position:

- 1858–1867: Lars O. Løseth
- 1868–1892: Peder J. Romundstad (V)
- 1893–1893: Anders Haagensli (MV)
- 1894–1897: Ole Langli (MV/H)
- 1898–1901: Ole Børset (V)
- 1902–1904: John P. Romundstad (V)
- 1905–1907: Einar Einarsen (V)
- 1908–1913: John O. Langli (V)
- 1914–1919: John P. Romundstad (V)
- 1920–1925: John O. Langli (Bp)
- 1926–1928: Torleiv Bakken (V)
- 1929–1931: John O. Langli (Bp)
- 1932–1934: John Gåsvatn (Bp)
- 1934–1934: John O. Langli (Bp)
- 1935–1940: Mikkel Bakken (Bp)
- 1948–1963: Nils O. Aune (Bp)
- 1963–1967: Arne Sæter (KrF)
- 1988–1991: Paul Haugen (Sp)
- 1992–2005: Ola T. Heggem (Sp)
- 2005–2007: Hanne Tove Baalsrud (Sp)
- 2007–2011: John Ole Aspli (Ap)
- 2011–2019: Ola T. Heggem (Sp)
- 2019–2022: Vibeke Langli (Sp)
- 2023–present: Mildrid Kattem Aune (Sp)

== Notable people ==
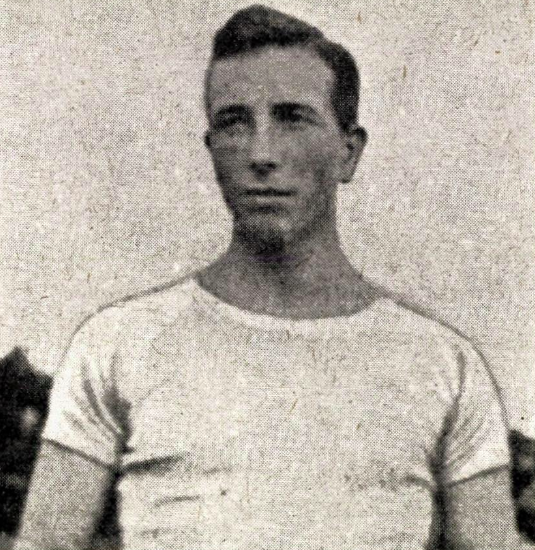
Einar Ræder, 1920

- Ola T. Heggem (born 1952 in Rindal), a Norwegian politician and Mayor of Rindal from 1992-2005 & 2011-2019

=== Sport ===
- Einar Ræder (1896 in Rindal – 1976), a long jumper, competed at the 1920 Summer Olympics
- Thorvald Heggem (1907 in Rindal - 1976), a Nordic combined skier and cross country skier
- Sigurd Røen (1909 in Rindal - 1992), a Nordic skier who competed in the 1930s
- Mikal Kirkholt (1920 in Rindal – 2012), a cross-country skier, team silver medallist at the 1952 Winter Olympics
- Magnar Ingebrigtsli (1932 in Rindal – 2001), a cross-country skier and biathlete, competed at the 1956 Winter Olympics
- Eli Landsem (born 1962 in Rindal), a former footballer and coach of the Norway women's national football team, 2009-2012
