= Thamshavn Line sabotage =

World War II railway sabotages in Norway

The Thamshavn Line sabotage was a series of sabotages against the railway Thamshavn Line in Orkdal Municipality, Norway during World War II. There were four separate sabotages, all performed by Company Linge in an attempt by the Norwegian resistance to prevent Germany from getting the pyrites that were being extracted at the mine at Løkken Verk.

== Background ==
The Løkken Mine had been operated since 1654, and in 1908 it was modernised with electric pumping and Norway's first electric railway that connected the mine to the port at Thamshavn, about 25 kilometres (16 mi) away. After the German invasion in 1940 German forces secured control over the mine, but let the operating company Orkla Gruber-Aktieselskab (that since has developed into the Forbes 500-company Orkla Group) continue extraction, since most of the export had been going to Germany anyway. The company obliged, since they saw no advantage in disobeying, which would only have resulted in the German forces themselves taking over the operation of the mine.

The Norwegian government-in-exile decided that it was important to stop the Germans from obtaining copper and sulfur from the mines and the smelters at Thamshavn (now Elkem Thamshavn) and initially suggested bombing both Løkken Verk and Thamshavn. The resistance protested, and felt that by using sabotage the civilian losses could be minimised. It was decided to attempt to stop the mining through targeted sabotage on key infrastructure along the railway.

== Transformer station ==
The first target was the transformer station for the railway at Bårdshaug. Since the railway operated solely on electric locomotives, removing the power source would make it impossible to operate it. Three soldiers from Company Linge were chosen for the action: Torleif Grong, Per Getz, and their leader Lieutenant Peter Deinboll. They traveled with a fishing boat from England and were put to shore at Bjørnør in Fosen and traveled by foot to Namdalseid. They were constantly passed by German trucks, and figured there would be less chance to be captured if they hitch hiked with one of them. When a truck offered them a lift they accepted, and the officer on board offered to sit in the back and watch their backpacks—which were filled with explosives. Luckily for the saboteurs the backpacks were not seized.

The night before 4 May 1942 the three men arrived at Orkdal Municipality where they targeted the transformer station. While they were installing the explosives German soldiers passed by, but failed their duty by not checking inside the station and thus were not able to stop the sabotage. The explosion went off at five in the morning. The commander in the area, Hauptmann Møbius, had been out drinking the evening before, and was not able to organise an efficient search or investigation. Unfortunately for Deinboll he had miscalculated the time before the explosion and was spotted by German troops and a chase was organised, but the troops failed to find him. He caught a ride with a fishing boat to Trondheim where he rendezvoused with Grong and Getz and they drove to Sweden via Meråker Municipality.

== Thamshavn ==
The second target for sabotage was the port at Thamshavn and was performed by Deinboll, Bjørn Pedersen and Olav Sættem. At first they lived at Deinboll's parents' home at Thamshavn, but later they moved to a cabin in the forest, receiving supplies from local resistance members. They figured, due to heavy security, that it would be impossible to blow up the factory itself, so instead they chose to blow up the ship D/S Nordfahrt, that would be full of pyrites. The night before 25 February 1943 the three went out in a row boat to fasten explosives to the ship, timed to go off at 16:00 the next day. But the next day another ship arrived at the port and Nordfahrt was moved out into the fjord. Because of this the timing mechanism became inaccurate and just when the explosives attached to the ship blew, a tugboat came by and managed to haul the wreck to land. The three each travelled to Trondheim, with plans to go to Sweden via Steinkjer Municipality and Ogndal Municipality, but their contact in Steinkjer had been arrested and instead they had to travel via Selbu Municipality.

== Locomotives ==
Neither of the two first sabotages had resulted in especially large problems that could not be fixed, and the resistance decided that the third target was to be the rack lift in the mine. Secondarily, if it failed, the saboteurs were to take out all of the locomotives able to pull railway cars, thus prohibiting the transport of pyrites. This required seven men, again led by Deinboll. They were dropped by parachute at Svorkdalskjølen and hid in cabins in the forest. But they were soon discovered, and chose to move to Skjenalddalen.

On 31 October 1943 the group planned to blow up one British Westinghouse locomotive and one rail car at Løkken and one ASEA at Orkanger and one rail car and two Westinghouse locomotives at Thamshavn. But not all the locomotives were located where the saboteurs thought they were and only four were blown up. This was not good enough for Deinboll, and it was decided that a new sabotage was to be performed at Klinghåmmår'n where they were to stop the train, chase the staff and blow up the train and track. But things went wrong, the explosives were miscalculated and Odd Nilsen was killed. At the same time an attempt to blow up a rail car at Løkken failed, again due to miscalculation in the explosive timing. After this the saboteurs left the area, but Paal Skjærpe was arrested in Hovin Municipality and tortured by Gestapo in Trondheim. But he did not talk, and was scheduled for execution on 17 May 1945, only days after peace came to Norway.

== Last attempt ==
The final attempt to close down the export came in 1944 when three men returned, via Sweden, to blow up the remaining locomotives. On 9 May they stopped a train at Hongslomælen, the crew was chased away and the train blown up. This was repeated on 31 May when they blew up the last rail car. But the Germans took countermeasures, and brought up steam locomotives from Germany to operate the line.

One of the great logistical problems of the Germans was that Thamshavnbanen operated on a 1,000 mm (3 ft 3 3/8 in) metre gauge railway, unlike the rest of the Norwegian network, that operated on 1,435 mm (4 ft 8 1/2 in) standard gauge or conventional narrow gauge 1,067 mm (3 ft 6 in). So acquisition of engines had to be done from the continent. And the railway was the only one in the world to use 25 Hz 6.6 kV AC power supply in combination with metre gauge, and so the Germans had to acquire steam locomotives. A total of seven were brought up from Germany and France. Also, the Germans chose to rebuild the railway with dual gauge, so the line had three parallel tracks, one in metre gauge and one in standard gauge. This would allow the Germans to operate steam engines from the Dovre Line on the standard gauge track and the railway cars on the narrow gauge tracks. No standard gauge locomotives were acquired and the third track was removed after the war.

== Aftermath ==
Halting the flow of pyrite ore from Løkken Verk and Thamshavn to the Nazi Wehrmacht was a key objective for the Norwegian resistance movement. Sabotage was chosen in lieu of bombing in order to safeguard the civilian population. Yet the attacks on the mine created a complex conflict of interest, as the operation of the mine nominally remained in local hands.

After the 1942 attack on the railway transformer, Chief of Electrical Engineering at the mine, Petter Deinboll's own father, engineer Petter Blessing Deinboll, was assigned the task of restoring power. He eventually decided to flee with his family to Sweden, where he worked for the resistance. On his return at the end of the war, Chief Engineer Deinboll was refused reinstatement in his job, he and his family were blamed for the wartime destruction, his house was taken over by others, and his properties auctioned off.

In 2003, Orkla Group issued an apology for their treatment of Petter Deinboll's family, and a commemorative bronze sculpture of the wartime saboteur was unveiled in Orkdal Municipality.
