= Orkanger Municipality =

Former municipality in Trøndelag, Norway

Orkanger Municipality Orkanger herred
- Former municipality
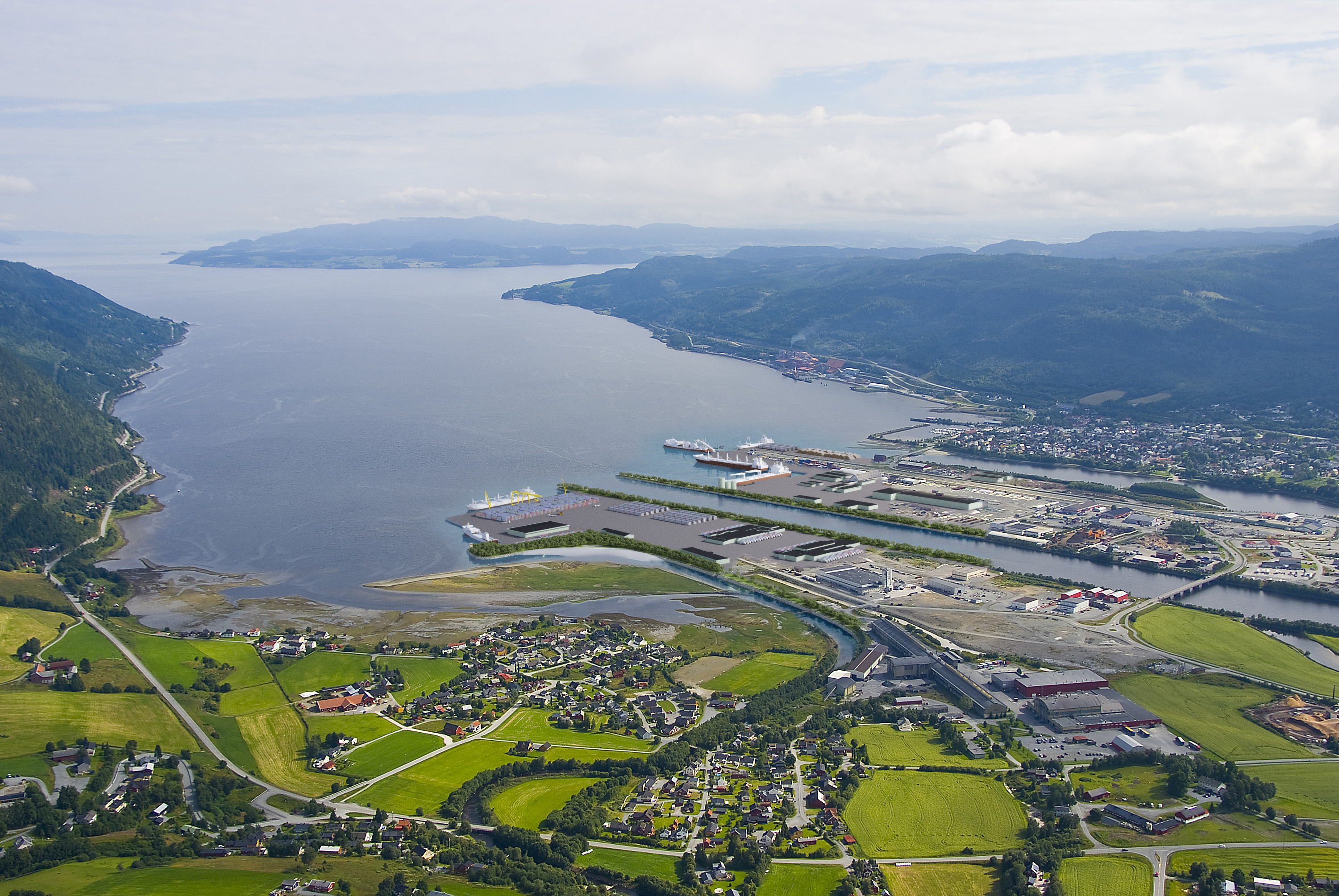
- View of the port of Orkanger

- Sør-Trøndelag within Norway

- Orkanger within Sør-Trøndelag
- Coordinates: 63°18′24″N 9°51′01″E
- Country: Norway
- County: Sør-Trøndelag
- District: Orkdalen
- Established: 1 July 1920
  - Preceded by: Orkdal Municipality
- Disestablished: 1 January 1963
  - Succeeded by: Orkdal Municipality
- Administrative centre: Orkanger

Government
  - Mayor (1956–1962): Sverre Solligård (Ap)

Area (upon dissolution)
  - Total: 6.64 km^{2} (2.56 sq mi)
  - Rank: #661 in Norway
- Highest elevation: 406 m (1,332 ft)

Population (1961)
  - Total: 2,910
  - Rank: #315 in Norway
  - Density: 438.3/km^{2} (1,135/sq mi)
  - Change (10 years): ▲ +8.3%
- Demonym: Ørbygg

Official language
  - Norwegian form: Neutral
- Time zone: UTC+01:00 (CET)
  - Summer (DST): UTC+02:00 (CEST)
- ISO 3166 code: NO-1639

Orkanger is a former municipality in Sør-Trøndelag county, Norway. The 6.64-square-kilometre (2.56 sq mi) municipality existed from 1920 until its dissolution in 1963. The area is now part of Orkland Municipality in the traditional district of Orkdalen. The administrative centre was the village of Orkanger. The municipality also included the Thamshavn industrial area.

Prior to its dissolution in 1963, the 6.64-square-kilometre (2.56 sq mi) municipality was the 661st largest by area out of the 705 municipalities in Norway. Orkanger Municipality was the 315th most populous municipality in Norway with a population of about 2,910. The municipality's population density was 438.3 inhabitants per square kilometre (1,135/sq mi) and its population had increased by 8.3% over the previous 10-year period.

== General information ==
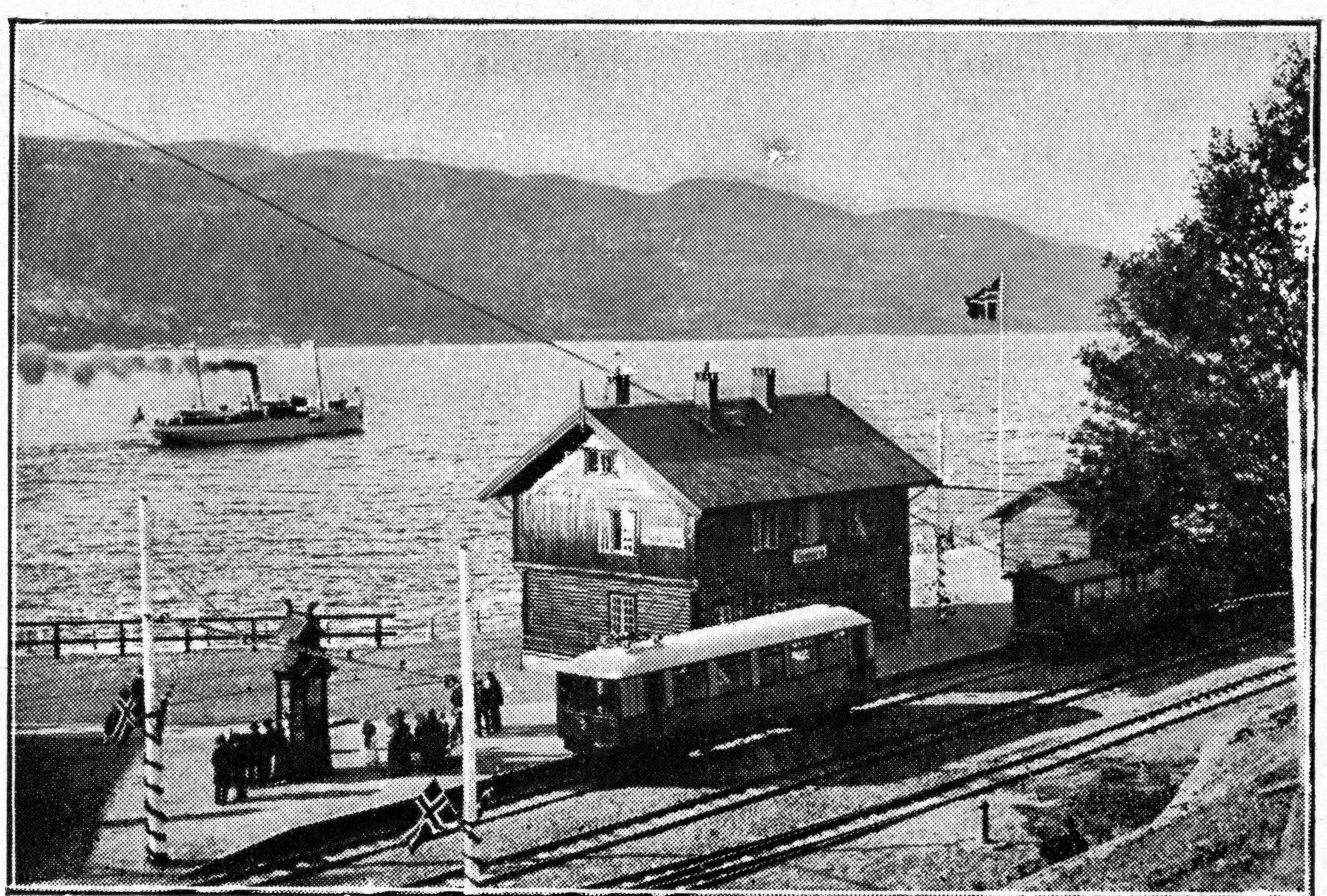
View of the Thamshavn area

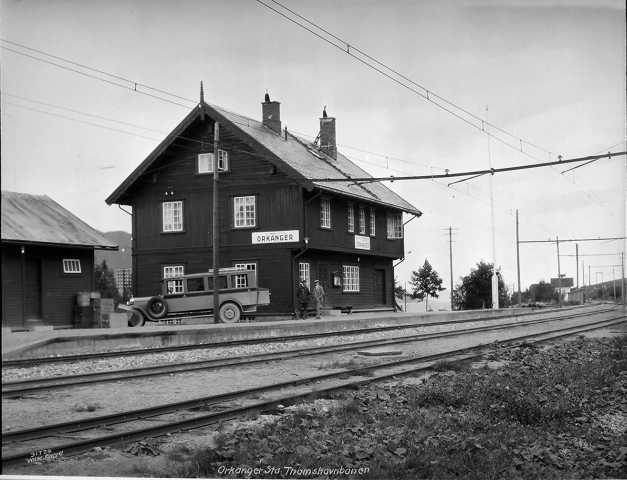
View of the Orkanger railway station

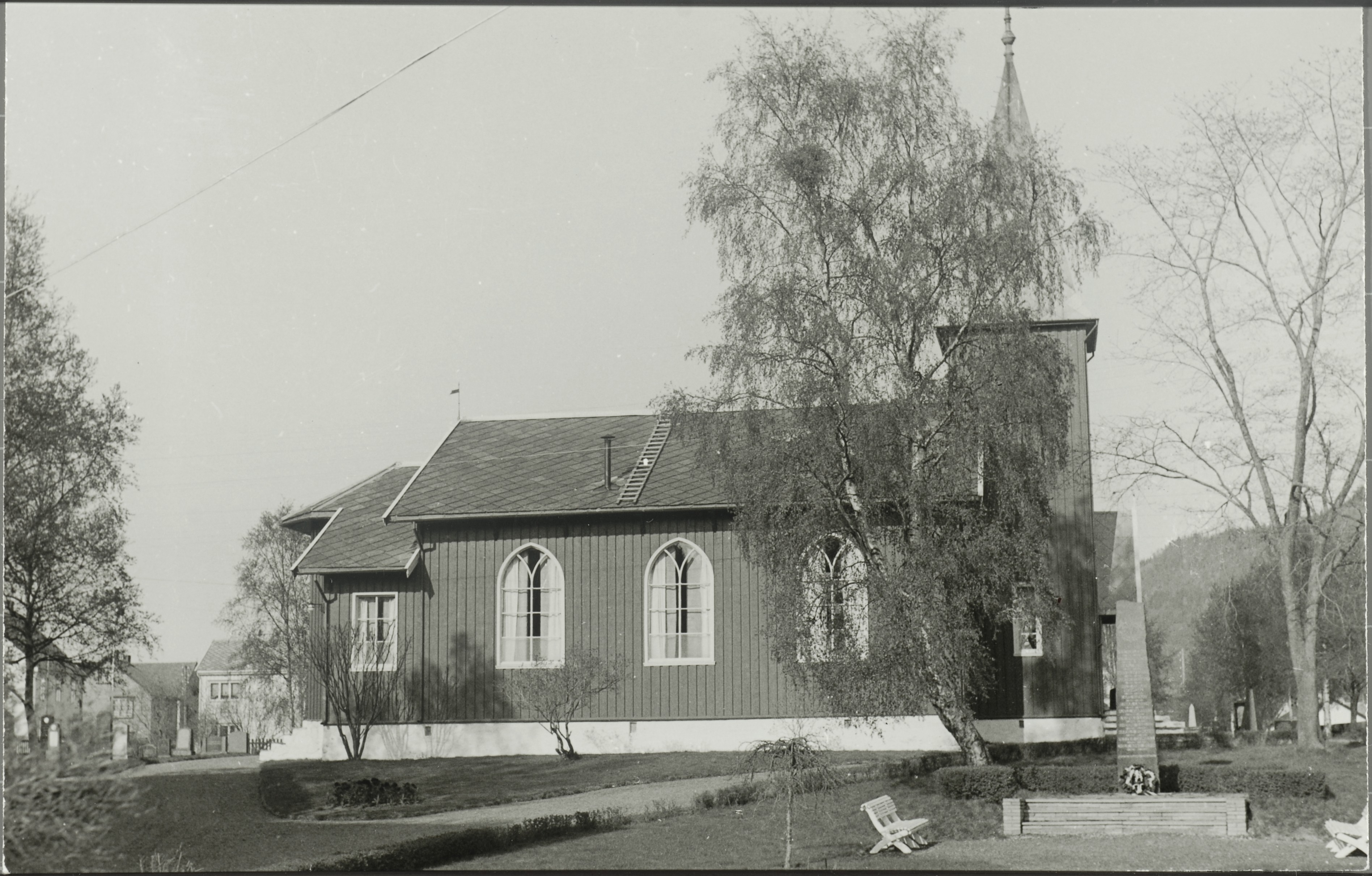
View of Orkanger Church in 1965

The area made up of the village of Orkdalsøra and the port of Thamshavn was established as Orkanger Municipality on 1 July 1920 when the large Orkdal Municipality was divided into three smaller municipalities: the northern urban port area (population: 1,715) became Orkanger Municipality, the southern part (population: 1,760) became Orkland Municipality, and the central area (population: 3,045) remained as Orkdal Municipality. Orkanger Municipality encompassed the 6.64-square-kilometre (2.56 sq mi) urban area and some of the surrounding countryside. It included an important port, but it did not have the designation of a town at that time.

During the 1960s, there were many municipal mergers across Norway due to the work of the Schei Committee. On 1 January 1963, Orkanger Municipality (population: 2,874) was merged with Orkdal Municipality (population: 4,152), Orkland Municipality (population: 1,707), and Geitastrand Municipality (population: 559) to form a new, larger Orkdal Municipality.

=== Name ===
The municipality was named "Orkanger". The first element is Ork, which stems from the lake Orkelsjøen from which the river Orkla runs. The meaning of the name is of the lake and river is not certain. The last element is angr which means "inlet" or "small fjord".

=== Churches ===
The Church of Norway had one parish (sokn) within Orkanger Municipality. At the time of the municipal dissolution, it was part of the Orkdal prestegjeld and the Orkdal prosti (deanery) in the Diocese of Nidaros.

Churches in Orkanger Municipality
Parish (sokn)	Church name	Location of the church	Year built
Orkanger	Orkanger Church	Orkanger	1892

== Geography ==
The municipality was located in the Orkdalen valley where the river Orkla empties into the Orkdalsfjorden. It was located about 35 kilometres (22 mi) southwest of the city of Trondheim. Børsa Municipality was located to the east and Orkdal Municipality was located to the south and west. The highest point in the municipality was the 406-metre (1,332 ft) tall mountain Hovshaugen, near the border with Børsa Municipality.

== Transportation ==
Just north of the village of Orkanger, the port of Thamshavn was located. Orkanger village had a station on the Thamshavn Line railway with the Thamshavn Station just north of the village. Between 1908 and 1949 there was a steam ship service to Trondheim on the SS Orkla.

== Government ==
While it existed, Orkanger Municipality was responsible for primary education (through 10th grade), outpatient health services, senior citizen services, welfare and other social services, zoning, economic development, and municipal roads and utilities. The municipality was governed by a municipal council of directly elected representatives. The mayor was indirectly elected by a vote of the municipal council. The municipality was under the jurisdiction of the Frostating Court of Appeal.

=== Municipal council ===
The municipal council (Herredsstyre) of Orkanger Municipality was made up of representatives that were elected to four-year terms. The tables below show the historical composition of the council by political party.

Orkanger herredsstyre 1959–1963
Party name (in Norwegian)	Number of representatives
Labour Party (Arbeiderpartiet)	12
Conservative Party (Høyre)	2
Communist Party (Kommunistiske Parti)	5
Liberal Party (Venstre)	2
Total number of members:	21
Note: On 1 January 1963, Orkanger Municipality became part of Orkdal Municipality.

Orkanger herredsstyre 1955–1959
Party name (in Norwegian)	Number of representatives
Labour Party (Arbeiderpartiet)	13
Conservative Party (Høyre)	2
Communist Party (Kommunistiske Parti)	3
Christian Democratic Party (Kristelig Folkeparti)	1
Liberal Party (Venstre)	2
Total number of members:	21

Orkanger herredsstyre 1951–1955
Party name (in Norwegian)	Number of representatives
Labour Party (Arbeiderpartiet)	11
Conservative Party (Høyre)	2
Communist Party (Kommunistiske Parti)	3
Christian Democratic Party (Kristelig Folkeparti)	1
Liberal Party (Venstre)	3
Total number of members:	20

Orkanger herredsstyre 1947–1951
Party name (in Norwegian)	Number of representatives
Labour Party (Arbeiderpartiet)	10
Communist Party (Kommunistiske Parti)	5
Liberal Party (Venstre)	5
Total number of members:	20

Orkanger herredsstyre 1945–1947
Party name (in Norwegian)	Number of representatives
Labour Party (Arbeiderpartiet)	10
Communist Party (Kommunistiske Parti)	6
Liberal Party (Venstre)	4
Total number of members:	20

Orkanger herredsstyre 1937–1941*
Party name (in Norwegian)	Number of representatives
Labour Party (Arbeiderpartiet)	12
Conservative Party (Høyre)	1
Communist Party (Kommunistiske Parti)	3
Liberal Party (Venstre)	4
Total number of members:	20
Note: Due to the German occupation of Norway during World War II, no elections were held for new municipal councils until after the war ended in 1945.

==== Mayors ====
The mayor (Norwegian: ordfører) of Orkanger Municipality was the political leader of the municipality and the chairperson of the municipal council. Here is a list of people who held this position:

- 1920–1925: Christian Togstad (Ap)
- 1926–1928: Martin Svebstad (Ap)
- 1929–1931: Ole Axelsen Moe Richter (V)
- 1932–1937: Oldus Larsen (Ap)
- 1938–1941: Asgeir Jørum (Ap)
- 1941–1945: Emil Carlsen (NS)
- 1945–1945: Asgeir Jørum (Ap)
- 1946–1955: Ole Monsen (Ap)
- 1956–1962: Sverre Solligård (Ap)

== See also ==
- List of former municipalities of Norway
