= Peter Deinboll =

Norwegian engineer and resistance member

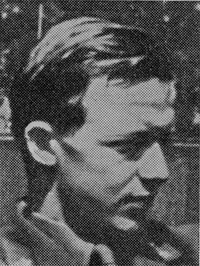
- Head shot from Våre falne 1939-1945.
- Born: Peter Vogelius Deinboll; 29 July 1915; Sulitjelma, Norway
- Disappeared: 8 November 1944 (aged 29) in transit between United Kingdom and Norway
- Occupations: Engineer and resistance member
- Known for: Sabotaging transport locomovites

Peter Vogelius Deinboll, DSO, MC (29 July 1915 – 8 November 1944) was a Norwegian engineer, and resistance member during World War II.

== Personal life ==
He was born in Sulitjelma as a son of Peter Blessing Deinboll and Sigfrid Hildur Deinboll, née Nagell. His parents hailed from Nærøy Municipality and Haugesund Municipality. He grew up in Orkanger, where his father worked for Salvesen & Thams at Thamshamn from 1920. Peter Deinboll had a degree in chemistry from the Norwegian Institute of Technology, and worked at the railway workshop at Thamshavn before the outbreak of World War II.

== World War II ==
When World War II reached Norway, he participated in Norwegian campaign battles. He fled to the United Kingdom in 1941 and was enrolled in the Special Operations Executive. In 1942 he led a series of sabotage operations directed against the transport of pyrites from the mines at Løkken Verk to Germany. He disappeared during air transport between the United Kingdom and Norway, 8 November 1944.

=== Thamshavn sabotage ===
Denboll was in charge of three of the sabotage operations directed against transport of pyrite from Løkken. The first operation took place in April–May 1942, when a transformer station at the Thamshavn Line was blown up. The second operation lasted from September 1942 until early 1943, when the German transport ship Nordfahrt (5,000 ton) was sunk at Thamshavn. The third operation, in October–November 1943, resulted in the blowing-up and destruction of five locomotives, and damaging others. Locomotives were not easy to replace, because the track width of the Thamshavn Line was not used by other railways in Europe. A fourth operation carried out by group Feather II led to further destruction of material. An electric locomotive which had been damaged by the Deinboll group had been sent to Oslo to be repaired at Skabo, but was eventually blown up by the sabotage group Oslogjengen in September 1944.

Deinboll was decorated with the War Cross with Sword, the St. Olav's Medal With Oak Branch, the Distinguished Service Order and Bar and the Military Cross.

== See also ==
- List of people who disappeared
