= Løkken Station =

Railway station in Løkken Verk, Orkland, Norway

Løkken
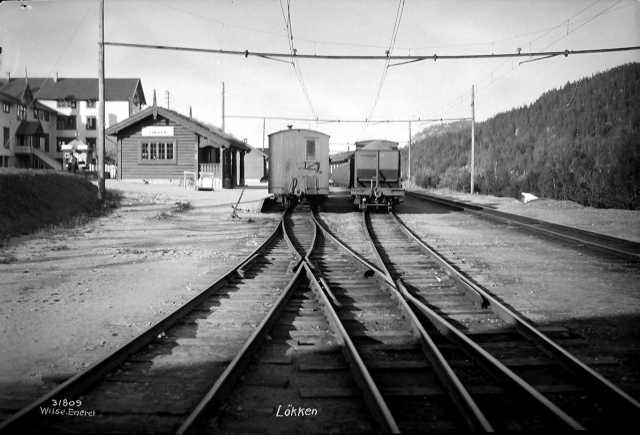

General information
- Location: Løkken Verk, Orkland Municipality; Norway
- Coordinates: 63.1247°N 9.7049°E
- Elevation: 163.5 m (536 ft)
- Owner: Chr. Salvesen & Chr. Thams's Communications Aktieselskab
- Line: Thamshavn Line
- Distance: 25.15 km (15.63 mi)

History
- Opened: 15 July 1908
- Closed: 1 May 1963
Location

Løkken Station (Norwegian: Løkken stasjon) is a former railway station that was the southern terminus of the old Thamshavn Line. It is located in the village of Løkken Verk in the present-day Orkland Municipality in Trøndelag county, Norway.

Preceding station		Following station
Terminus	Thamshavn Line	Svorkmo; Jordhusmoen
