= Orkla Mining Company =

Norwegian mining company

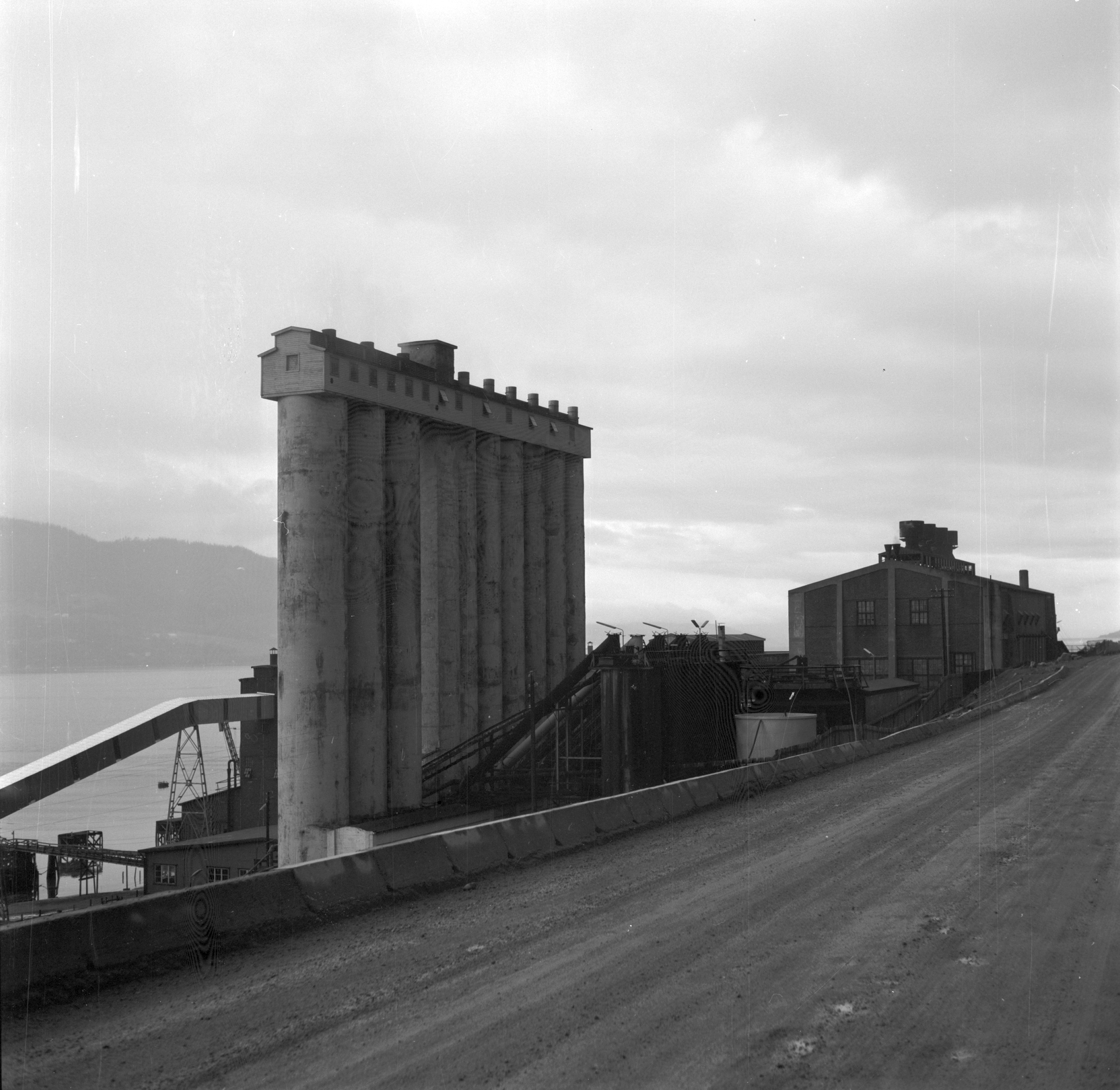
Orkla Mining Co. smelter in Thamshavn

Orkla Mining Company Ltd. (Norwegian: Orkla Grube-Aktiebolag) was a Norwegian mining company established in 1904. The company was the largest mining company in Norway in the aftermath of World War I, and was among the world's largest pyrite producers. After closing of the mining operations in 1987, the company developed into the holding company Orkla ASA, which is among the largest companies at Oslo Stock Exchange.

== History ==
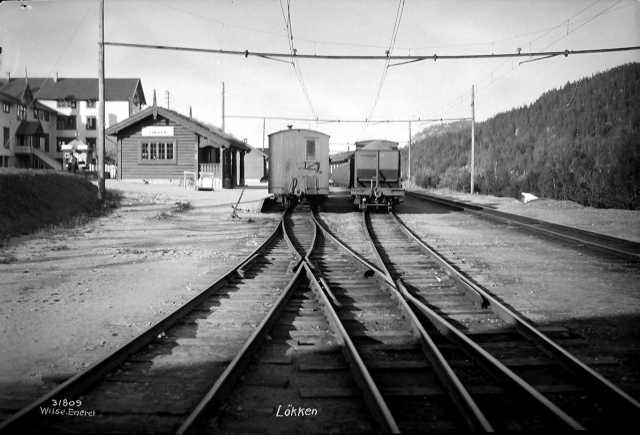
Løkken railway station on Thamshavnbanen in Meldal

Orkla Mining Co. Ltd. was established as a limited company at a constituting meeting in Stockholm on 7 December 1904. The purpose of the company was to acquire mines in the Orkdalen district in Sør-Trøndelag and subsequently start operations. The share capital was applied for the acquirement of several mines from Christian Salvesen, including Løkken Verk, Åmot gruve, Høidal gruve and Dragset Verk as well various properties at Orkanger and elsewhere in Orkdalen. Christian Salvesen together with Wilhelm August Thams had started Ørkedalens Mining in Meldal in 1867.

The company bought a significant amount of shares of the company Chr. Salvesen & Chr. Thams's Communications Aktieselskab, whose purpose was to develop the infrastructure of the area and was responsible for electricity production and railway operation for Løkken Mine. In 1913, Swedish banker Marcus Wallenberg, Sr. became Chairman of the Board of Directors.

Following a period of exploration mining at the Løkken Mine, large-scale mining of pyrites was initiated. The mining community Løkken Verk was developed in Meldal Municipality and the Thamshavn Line (Thamshavnbanen) was constructed for transport of ore to the sea for export.

In 1931, a smelting plant (now Elkem Thamshavn) at the port of Thamshavn started operations, based on the sulphur extraction process developed by Orkla.

The Orkla Mining Company was the largest mining company in Norway in the interwar years, and among the world's largest pyrite producers. After the closing of mining operations at Løkken Mine in 1987, the company developed into the holding company Orkla Group.

== Related reading ==
- Hauge, Odd Harald (2014). Visst faen er det personlig Orkla - selskap og slagmark i mer enn 100 år (in Norwegian). Oslo: Kagge Forlag AS. ISBN 9788248915263.
