= Orkla =

Orkla may refer to:

== Places ==
- Orkla (river), a river in Trøndelag county, Norway

== Business ==
- Orkla ASA, a Norwegian conglomerate
- Orkla Mining Company, a historic company in Norway
- Orkla Metall, a former smelting company in Norway
- Orkla Media, a former media company in Norway
