= Chr. Salvesen & Chr. Thams's Communications Aktieselskab =

Norwegian company

- Company type: Subsidiary
- Industry: Transport; Real Estate; Energy
- Founded: 1898
- Headquarters: Løkken Verk, Norway
- Area served: Meldal Municipality, Norway
- Key people: Arve Slørdahl (CEO)
- Parent: Orkla Group
- Website: http://www.orkla.com

Chr. Salvesen & Chr. Thams's Communications Aktieselskab, Salvesen & Thams, Comms. AS or S&T is a Norwegian company based at Løkken Verk in Meldal Municipality that was responsible for electricity production and railway operation for Løkken Mine operated by the Orkla Mining Company. After the mine closed in 1987 it has been turned into a development company to try to create new jobs at Løkken.

== History ==
Mining at Løkken Verk had its roots back to 1633 when King Christian IV of Denmark-Norway had opened the mine. At this time all mining was a privilege of the king. Later, in the 1800s, the mine was privatised and owned by Løkken Kobber og Kisværks Interessentskab.

In 1868, Wilhelm Thams (1812–1884), the owner of lumber company Strandheim Brug in Orkanger, Norway, and Christian Salvesen of Turnbull, Salvesen and Company in Leith, Scotland, founded the mining company Ørkedals Mining Company and bought a number of small mines around Løkken. In the early 1880s, Wilhelm's grandson, Christian Thams returned from Switzerland and took over the running of the mining company. He realised that to make money from mining, he had to purchase the largest mine of the all, but didn't succeed until 1896 when it no longer was feasible to manually pump out the water, and bought Løkken Mine.

At this time it was fully possible for foreigners to own mines in Norway, but they could not own power plant or railways. So while the mining company was financed primarily be foreign capital, Salvesen & Thams was owned only by Chr. Thams and Salvesen, both originally locals, and could thus get the necessary permissions. Despite this, the company was bought by the mining company in 1904. The initial responsibility was to construct a hydro electric power plant at Skjenaldfossen, build the railway Thamshavnbanen between Løkken Verk and Thamshavn and operate the steamship Orkla between Thamshavn and Trondheim. After World War I the company also started with bus transport, and among other things started the company Trondhjem-Orkladal Billag.

In 1931 Orkla Metall (now Elkem Thamshavn) was established as a smelter at Thamshavn, and Salvesen & Thams was responsible for the running of the plant. This lasted until 1963 when the corporation was reorganised and the company became a pure holding company, owning the power plant and railway, but not operating them. It later sold its ownership in bus transport while the shipping had been terminated in 1959.

When the mine closed in 1987 the company got a new life with responsibilities for creating new local jobs in Meldal to replace the jobs lost due to the closing of the mine. The company has ventured into tourism, fishing and real estate. The greatest incomes have though been made in bus transport. In 1989 the Kyrksæterøra-based company Hemne og Orkladal Billag was in great economic trouble, and along with the Hemne Municipality and Kredittkassen Salvesen & Thams went in and made a great success out of the company. In 2001 it was merged with Trondheim Trafikkselskap to create Team Trafikk and it was sold to Nettbuss with great profit.

== Sources ==
`

- Tokle, Bjørn (1998) Communication gjennom 100 år (Chr. Salvesen & Chr. Thams's Communications Aktieselskab)
