= Svorkmo Station =

Railway station in Orkland, Norway

Svorkmo
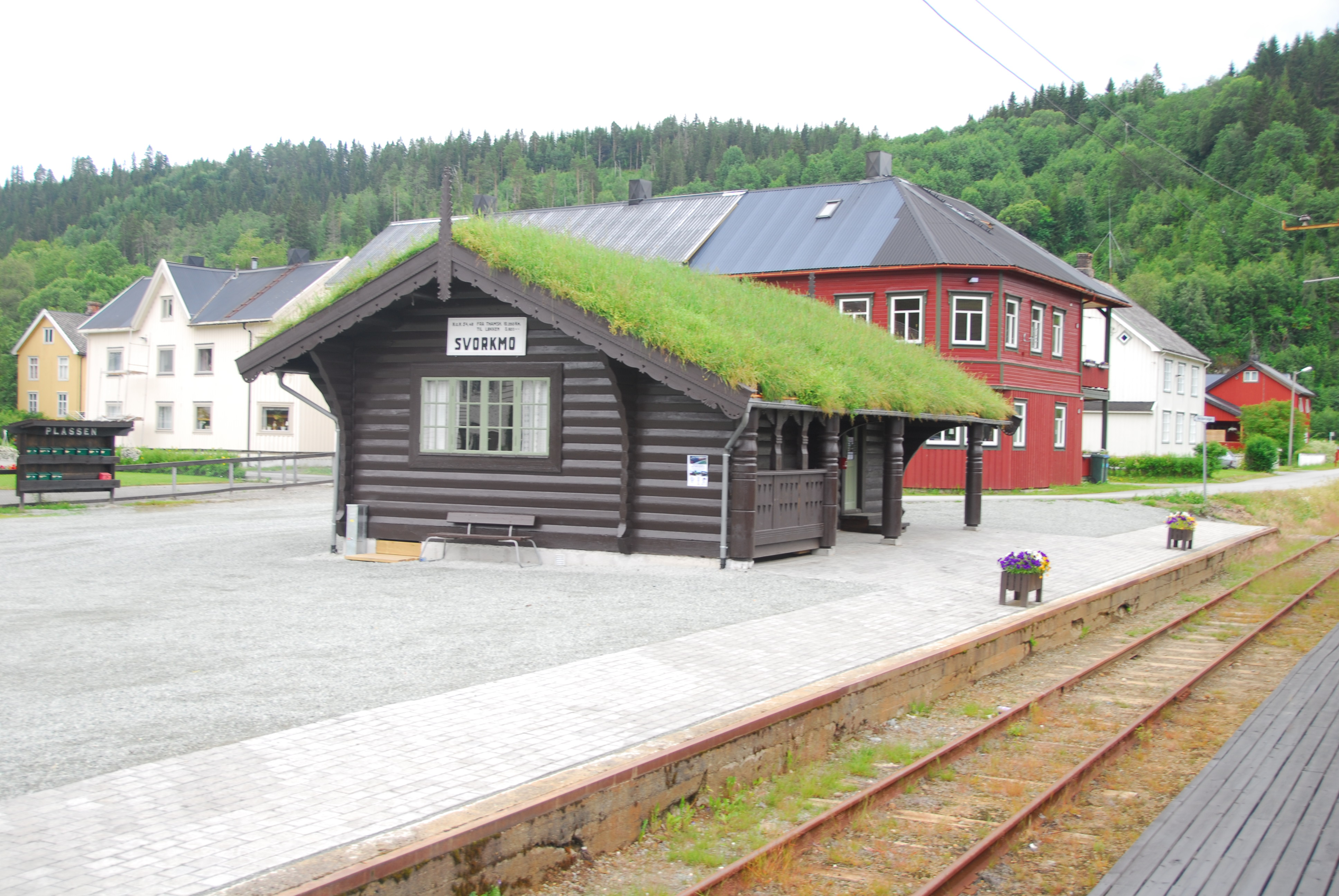

General information
- Location: Svorkmo, Orkland Municipality; Norway
- Coordinates: 63.1679°N 9.7459°E
- Elevation: 54.5 metres (179 ft)
- Owner: Chr. Salvesen & Chr. Thams's Communications Aktieselskab
- Operator: Orkla Mining Company
- Line: Thamshavn Line
- Distance: 19.35 kilometres (12.02 mi)

History
- Opened: 15 July 1908
- Closed: 1 May 1963
Location

Svorkmo Station (Norwegian: Svorkmo stasjon) is a former railway station on the Thamshavn Line, located in the village of Svorkmo in Orkland Municipality in Trøndelag county, Norway. The station is located along the river Orkla.

Preceding station		Following station
Fannrem; Øyum	Thamshavn Line	Løkken; Skjøtskift
