= Svorkmo Hydroelectric Power Station =

Hydroelectric power station in Norway

Svorkmo Power Station
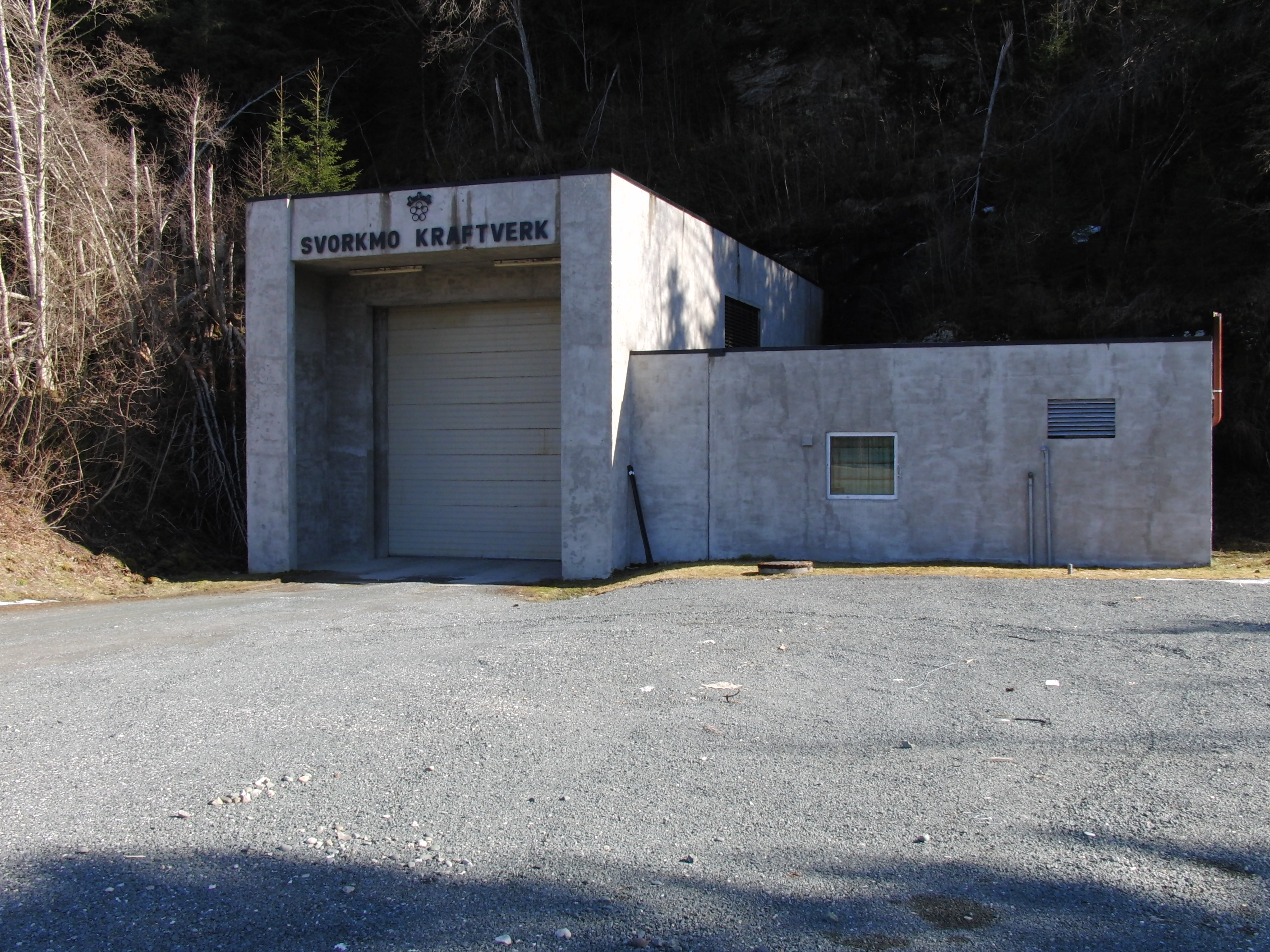
- Svorkmo Hydroelectric Power Station
- Official name: Svorkmo Kraftverk
- Country: Norway
- Location: Orkland Municipality, Trøndelag
- Coordinates: 63°10′42″N 9°46′15″E
- Opening date: 1983; 42 years ago
- Owner(s): Kraftverkene i Orkla

Power Station
- Hydraulic head: 99 metres (325 ft)
- Turbines: 2
- Installed capacity: 54 MW
- Capacity factor: 57.1%
- Annual generation: 270 GW·h

Svorkmo Power Station is a hydroelectric power station located in Svorkmo in Orkland Municipality in Trøndelag county, Norway.

It has a total installed capacity of 54 megawatts (72,000 hp), with two units equipped with francis turbines, and has an annual production of approximately 270 gigawatt-hours (970 TJ). The power station utilises the waterfalls between Meldal and Svorkmo on the Orkla river system, with a total head of 99 metres (325 ft).
