= Elkem =

International chemical company specialising in silicon

Elkem ASA

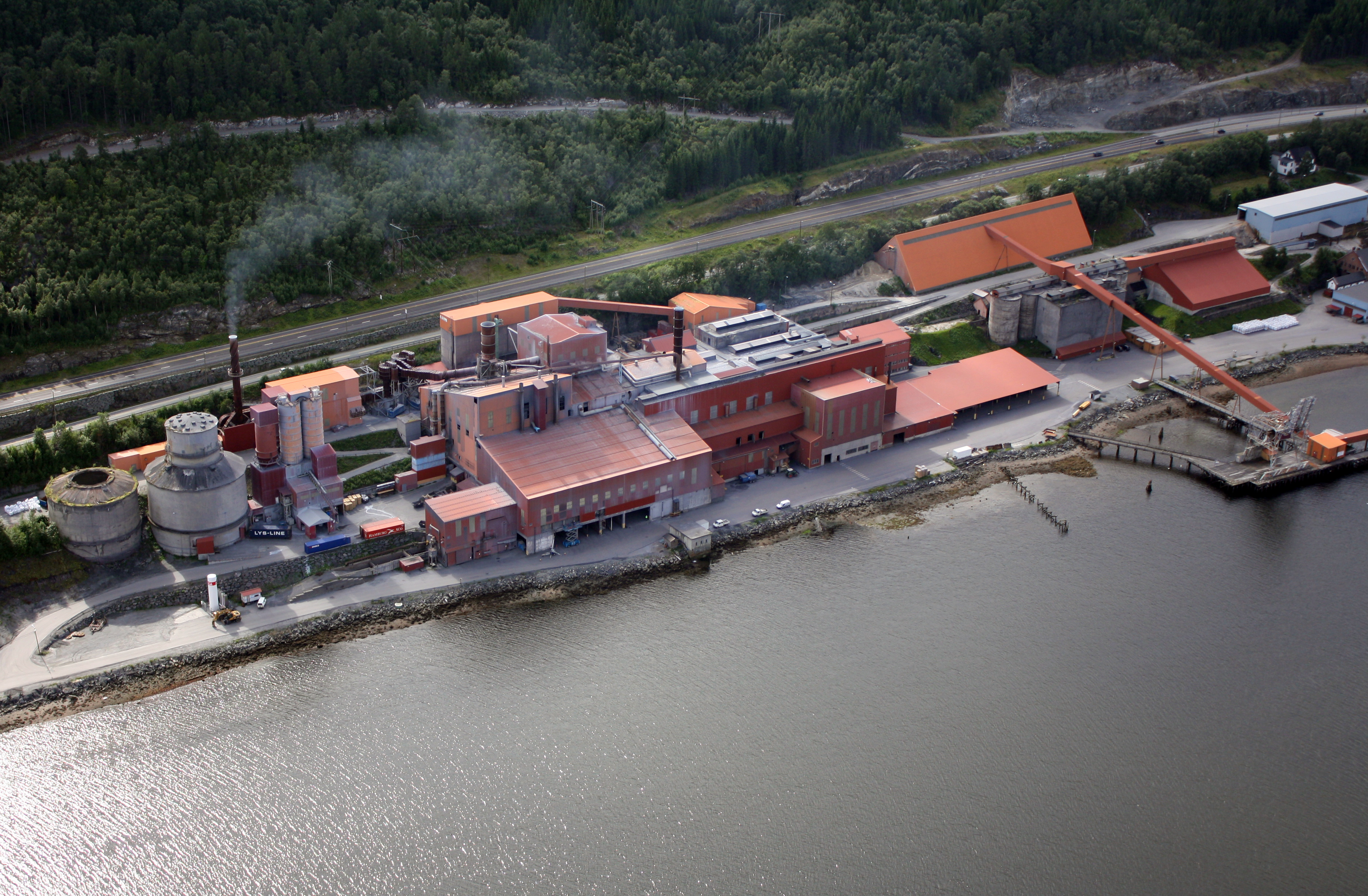
- Elkem Thamshavn site near Orkanger.
- Trade name: Elkem
- Type: Allmennaksjeselskap
- Traded as: Oslo Stock Exchange: ELK
- Industry: Chemical; Metal
- Founded: January 2, 1904; 122 years ago
- Founder: Sam Eyde; Wallenberg family; Knut Tillberg
- Headquarters: Oslo, Norway
- Products: Silicone; Silicon; Alloys; Carbon; Microsilica
- Revenue: 33,004,000,000 Norwegian krone (2024)
- Number of employees: 7,262 (2024)
- Parent: China National Bluestar
- Website: elkem.com

Elkem ASA is an international chemical company that produces silicones, silicon, alloys for the foundry industry, carbon and microsilica, and other materials.Elkem was founded in 1904, and has more than 7,200 employees and fields 31 production sites worldwide. Elkem is also listed on the Oslo Stock Exchange (ticker: ELK).

== History ==
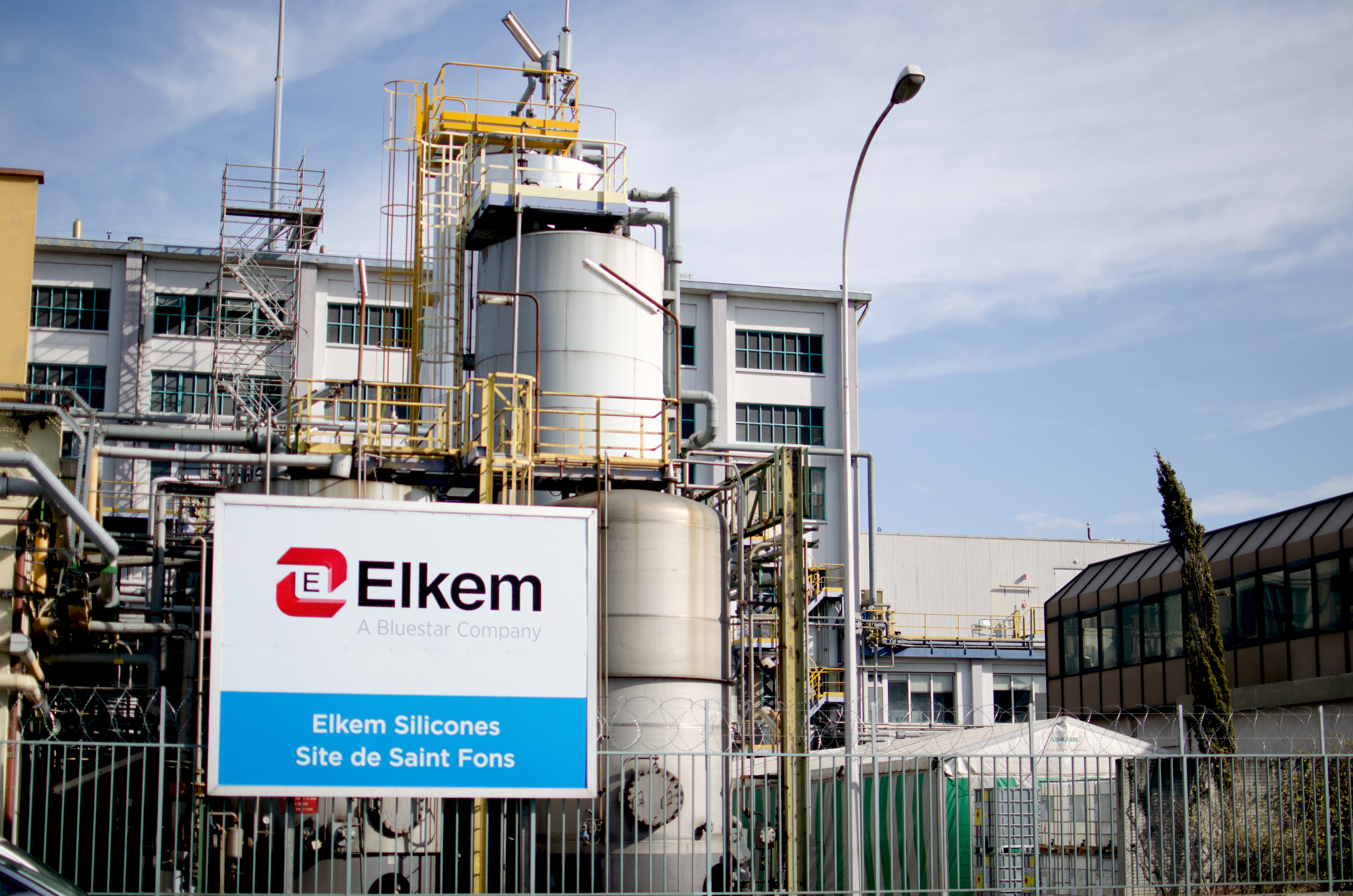
Elkem plant in Saint-Fons in Lyon.

Elkem was founded in 1904 by the industrial entrepreneur Sam Eyde (1866 – 1940) as Det Norske Aktieselskab for elektro-kemisk Industri (Elektrokemisk). The company was established with funding from the prominent Wallenberg family and Knut Tillberg.

In 1917 a ferroalloy plant was acquired and Elkem started production of the Söderberg electrode.

In 1972, the company merged with Christiania Spigerverk, also becoming a producer of steel.

Between 1981 and 1984 Elkem acquired Union Carbide plants in Norway and North America and in 1986 the plants at Thamshavn and Bjølvefossen.

In the 2000s Elkem had acquired Icelandic Alloy, Remi Claeys Aluminium and Sapa.

In January 2005, Orkla bought a controlling stake in the company.

In 2006, Elkem closed its Meraker plant, which it had bought from Union Carbide in 1981, causing around 100 employees to lose their jobs.

In January 2011, Elkem was sold by Orkla to China National Bluestar for $2 billion.

In 2018, the company became listed on the Oslo Stock Exchange.

As stated in its annual report from 2024, the company had more than 7,200 employees at 31 production sites, and a revenue of 33 billion NOK. China National Bluestar (52.91%) is the largest shareholder, ahead of Folketrygdfondet (4.28%) and Must Invest (3.07%).

== See also ==
- Elkem Thamshavn
