= SS Orkla =

A number of steamships have been named Orkla, including:

- SS Orkla (1908), Norwegian ship in service 1908–39
- SS Orkla (1918), Norwegian cargo ship in service 1953–57
