= Frank Selvag =

Norwegian ten-pin bowling player

Personal information
- Full name: Frank Robert Selvag
- Nickname: Dirty Frank
- Nationality: Norwegian
- Born: May 12, 1989 (age 36) Orkanger
- Years active: 2004 – present
- Employer: Mint Sportswear
- Height: 184 cm (6 ft 0 in)
- Weight: 70 kg (154 lb)
- Other interests: Snooker
- Website: www.frankselvag.com

Sport
- Sport: Bowling
- Club: Trønderstrike Bowlingklubb
- Coached by: Leif Espen Skjegstad
- Updated on December 13, 2018

Frank Robert Selvag (born May 12, 1989) is a Norwegian bowling player living in the city Trondheim, who has played for Trønderstrike Bowlingklubb since 2018.

He started his bowling career when he was 14 years old in the small city Orkanger just an hour south of Trondheim. In 2006 he went from Orkla Bowlingklubb to Trondheim Bowlingklubb but changed back to his former club three years later.

In the middle of the 2011/12 season he went for a shocking transfer to the rival club Munken Bowlingklubb, and in the summer of 2018 he moved on to Trønderstrike Bowlingklubb.

He didn't play much during the 2013/14 season when his club became national champions and national league winners, but he qualified to get medals. The season before and after he achieved silver medals with his club in the national league.

In September 2015 he got an injury in his left knee, but it was not until the following March that the doctors found out his ligament was 60% ripped off. He took a risk playing in the Malta Open Championship three months later despite the doctor advising him not to. In late September 2016 he tried to bowl again but after just one game he decided to take it slower in rebuilding himself.

In late 2019 he broke his thumb and was forced to switch to a two-handed style.

He has played tournaments all around Europe since 2013 in countries like Romania, Czech Republic, Malta and more.

== Personal records ==
Game(s)	Score	Average	Event
1	300		Malta Open Championships 2015
3	784	266,3	National league 2013
4	1110	277,5	National league 2016
5	1263	252,6	Local tournament 2017
6	1481	246,8	Czech Open 2014
