= Elkem Thamshavn =

Smelting plant in Norway

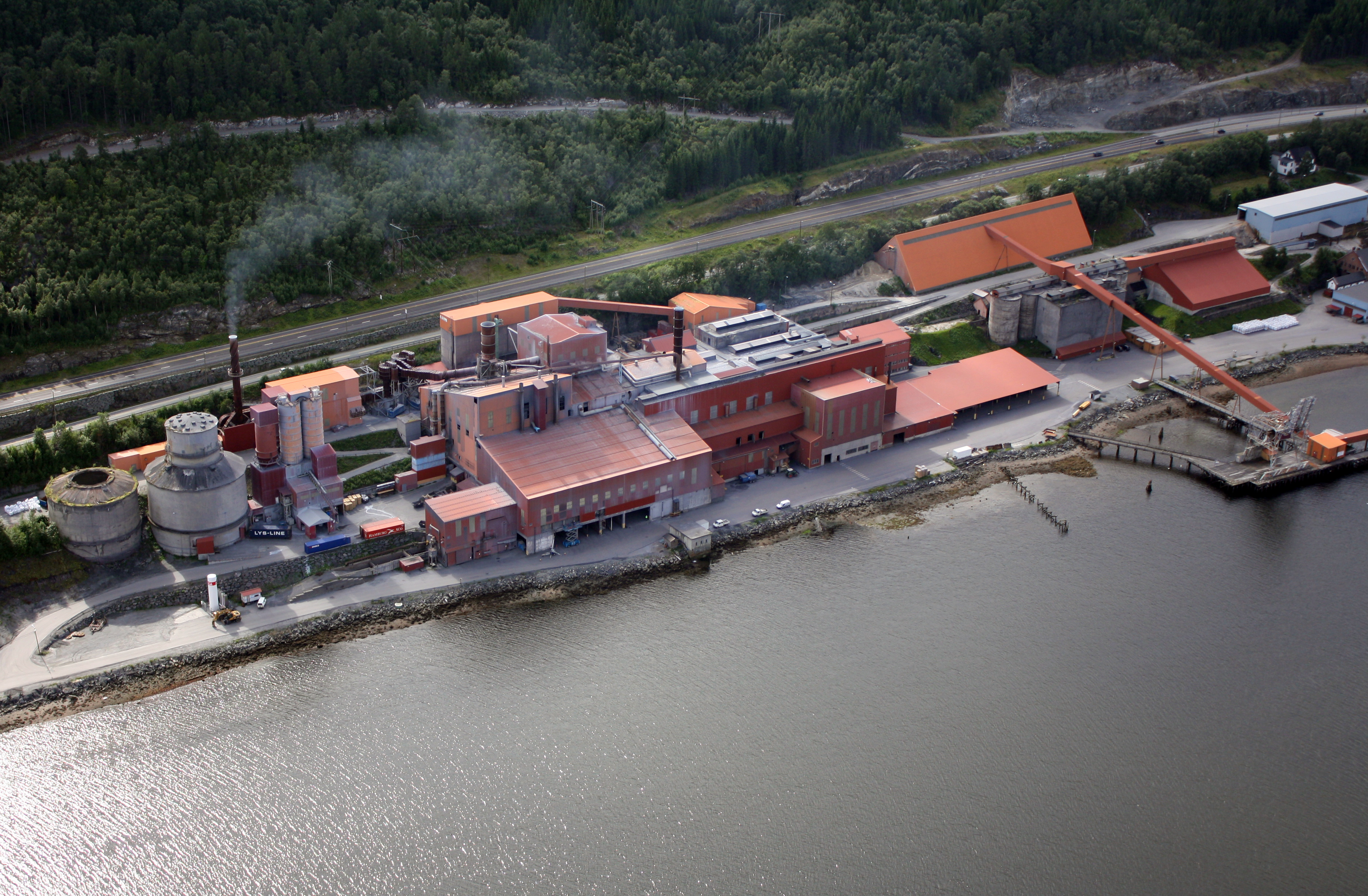
Elkem Thamshavn in 2010.

Elkem Thamshavn is a smelting plant owned by Elkem located at Thamshavn just north of Orkanger in Orkland Municipality in Trøndelag county, Norway. The plant produces silicon and microsilica and was started in 1931.

== History ==
Copper and Sulfur have been excavated in the Løkken Mine since 1654 that had to be freighted down to Orkanger and onwards to Europe by ship.

In 1867, Wilhelm Thams built a sawmill at Thamshavn, and the place took the surname of his family. His grandson Christian Thams, together with Christian Salvesen, bought the mines at Løkken Verk in 1904 and constructed a railway, Thamshavnbanen, from the mine and down the 25 kilometres (16 mi) to the port at Thamshavn.

In 1931 Orkla Metall was opened, officially owned by the subsidiary Chr. Salvesen & Chr. Thams's Communications Aktieselskab that also owned the railway and the hydroelectric power plant.

The original function of the plant was to smelt the pyrites from the mine into sulphur and copper matte. This lasted until 1962 when the plant closed. But in 1964 it reopened with a new furnace for ferrosilicon production, with a second furnace opening in 1981. The company was acquired by Elkem in 1986, that was bought by the original owner, Orkla Group, in 2005.
