= Reinertsen =

Norwegian supply company

Reinertsen AS
- Company type: Private
- Founded: 1946
- Headquarters: Trondheim, Norway
- Area served: Scandinavia
- Key people: Erik Reime Reinertsen (CEO); Torkild Reime Reinertsen (Chairman)
- Revenue: €400 million (2011)
- Number of employees: 2,100 (2011)
- Website: reinertsen.no

Reinertsen is a civil engineering, construction, and petroleum industry supply company based in Trondheim, Norway. It was established in 1946 and remains family-owned. Its CEO is Erik Reinertsen and chairman is Torkil R. Reinertsen. In 2011, Reinertsen had a revenue of €400 million and 2,100 employees. It has offices in Trondheim, Orkanger, Oslo, Bergen, Gothenburg, Stockholm, Murmansk (Russia) and Szczecin (Poland).
