= Christian Thams =

Norwegian architect, industrialist, businessman and diplomat

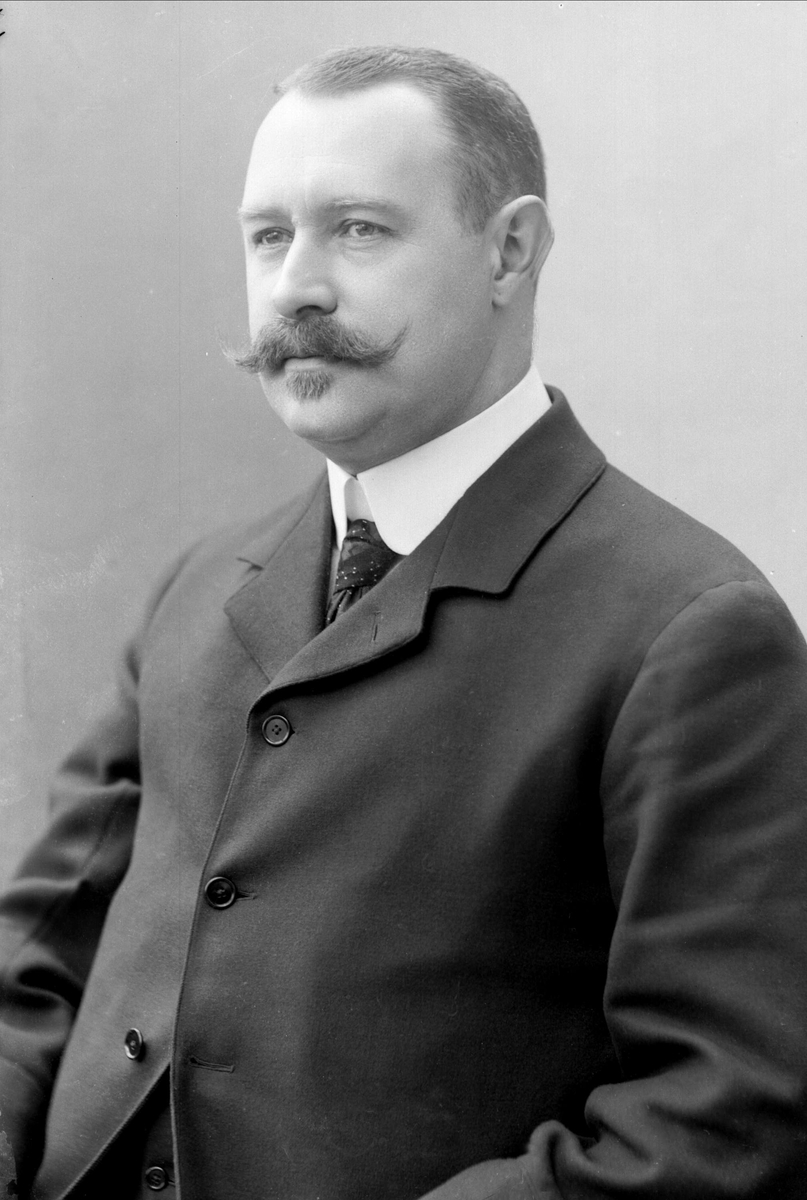
Christian Thams

Christian Thams (9 September 1867 – 22 May 1948) was a Norwegian architect, industrialist, businessman and diplomat. Thams was also a founder and major shareholder of Société du Madal, a Norwegian company which operated coconut oil plantations and extracted colonial taxes from the indigenous population in Zambezia, Mozambique.

== Background ==
Christian Marius Thams was born in Trondheim in Søndre Trondhjem county, Norway. His parents were Marentius Thams (1836-1907) and Emilie Christine Ullitz (1838-1916). He was educated at a school for boys in Grenchen, Switzerland and at a technical school in Holzminden, Germany. Christian Thams studied at Technikum Winterthur in Zurich, Switzerland, where he graduated in 1886. The following year, he established himself as an architect with practice in Nice and Paris.

The foundation of the family fortune was Örkedals Mining Company. His grandfather Wilhelm August Thams (1812-1884), together with Norwegian businessman Christian Salvesen, had started Ørkedalens Mining in Meldal Municipality in 1867.

The acquisition of the Løkken Mine in 1896 marked their dominant position with control of all mines in the region. The Løkken mine was however flooded, and in order to extract the pyrite Thams had to empty the mine of water. This was done by constructing a pipeline from nearby lake Bjørnlivatnet to transport water to a power station inside the mine. This power station produced 60 kilowatt to run a pump station mounted on a timber raft. As the water was pumped out of the mine, the raft sank with the sinking water, and in this way the mine was emptied of water in two years.

== Career ==
In 1904 Christian Thams founded Orkla Grube-Aktiebolag whose main activity was mining at Løkken Verk. Thams soon realized that extended access to electricity would be of great benefit to his businesses. He therefore decided to build a hydro electric plant, and got a concession to build at Skjenaldfossen waterfall, following his acquisition in 1899 of the rights to utilize the power from the river. This marked the beginning of large-scale production at the mine and an important milestone in the history of the Norwegian industrial conglomerate Orkla. Christian Thams is also known for construction of Thamshavnbanen, the first electric railroad in Norway, visited by Norwegian King Haakon VII at its opening on July 10, 1908.

Among Thams' other activities was Strandheim Brug, a sawmill and prefabrication of houses business. This production was also powered by hydroelectricity. The successful industrialization of the activities in Orkdal Municipality coincided with other key entrepreneurial ventures of that time (1890 to 1910) that were all based on the new technology of hydroelectricity. Most of them are still key players in the Norwegian economy. In addition to Orkla, Norsk Hydro, Borregaard and Hafslund are prominent examples.

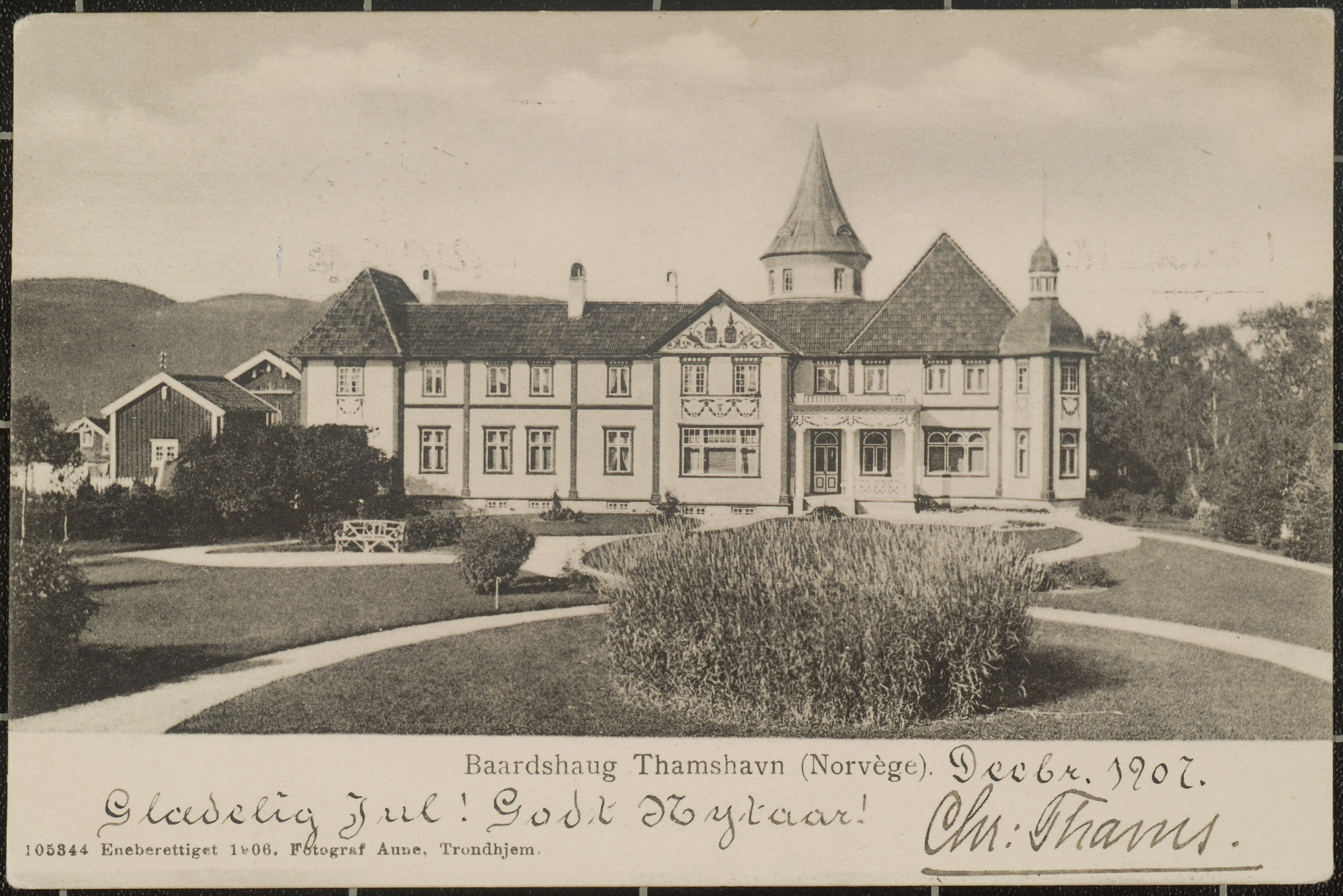
Bårdshaug Herregård at Orkanger. 1906

== Honors ==
Christian Trams served as Belgian Consul General in Norway, French vice-consul, and Commercial Trade representative for Monaco. Thams received various honors including Gold medal for designing the Norwegian pavilion at the Exposition Universelle (1889), Knight First Class Order of St. Olav, Knight in the Swedish Order of the Polar Star and Knight of the French Legion of Honour.

His former residence in the village of Orkanger, Bårdshaug Herregård, was located on the banks of the Orkdalsfjord, an arm of the Trondheimsfjord, at the mouth of the Orklaelva. It is today the site of a historic hotel.

== See also ==
- Chr. Salvesen & Chr. Thams's Communications Aktieselskab

== Other Sources ==
- Tokle, Bjørn (1998) Communication gjennom 100 år (Chr. Salvesen & Chr. Thams's Communications Aktieselskab)
