= Thamshavn Station =

Former railway station in Norway

Thamshavn
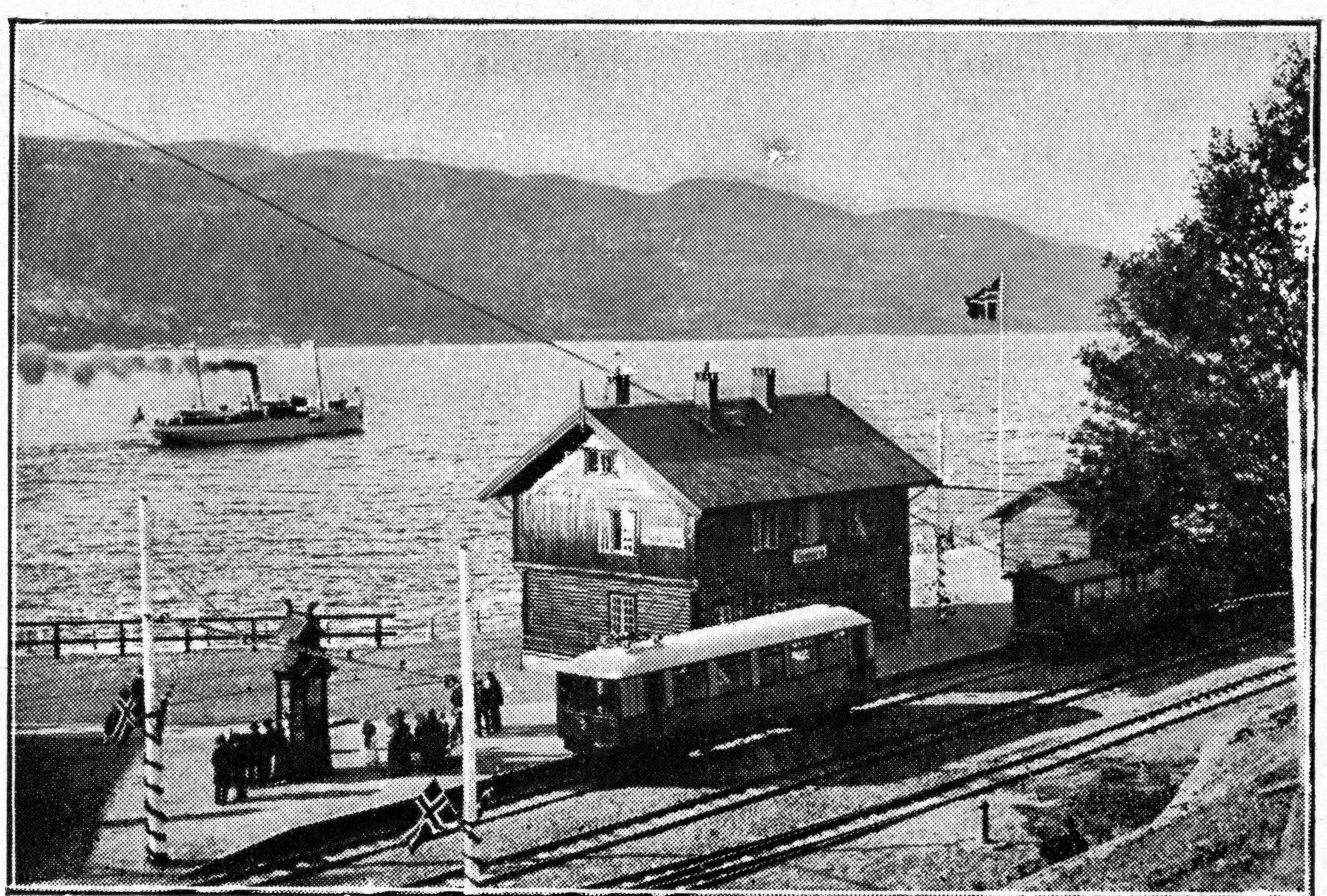
- Thamshavn station in Orkdal, Norway

General information
- Location: Thamshavn, Orkland Municipality; Norway
- Coordinates: 63.3187°N 9.8776°E
- Elevation: 2.8 m (9 ft 2 in)
- Owner: Chr. Salvesen & Chr. Thams's Communications Aktieselskab
- Line: Thamshavn Line
- Distance: 0.15 km (0.093 mi)

History
- Opened: 15 July 1908
- Closed: 1 May 1963
Location

Thamshavn Station (Norwegian: Thamshavn stasjon) is a former railway station on the Thamshavn Line, located at Thamshavn, a port area just northeast of the town of Orkanger in Orkland Municipality in Trøndelag county, Norway. It is located along the present day European route E39 highway.

| Preceding station | | Following station |
|---|---|---|
| Terminus | Thamshavn Line | Orkanger |
