= SS Orkla (1908) =

Ship built in 1908

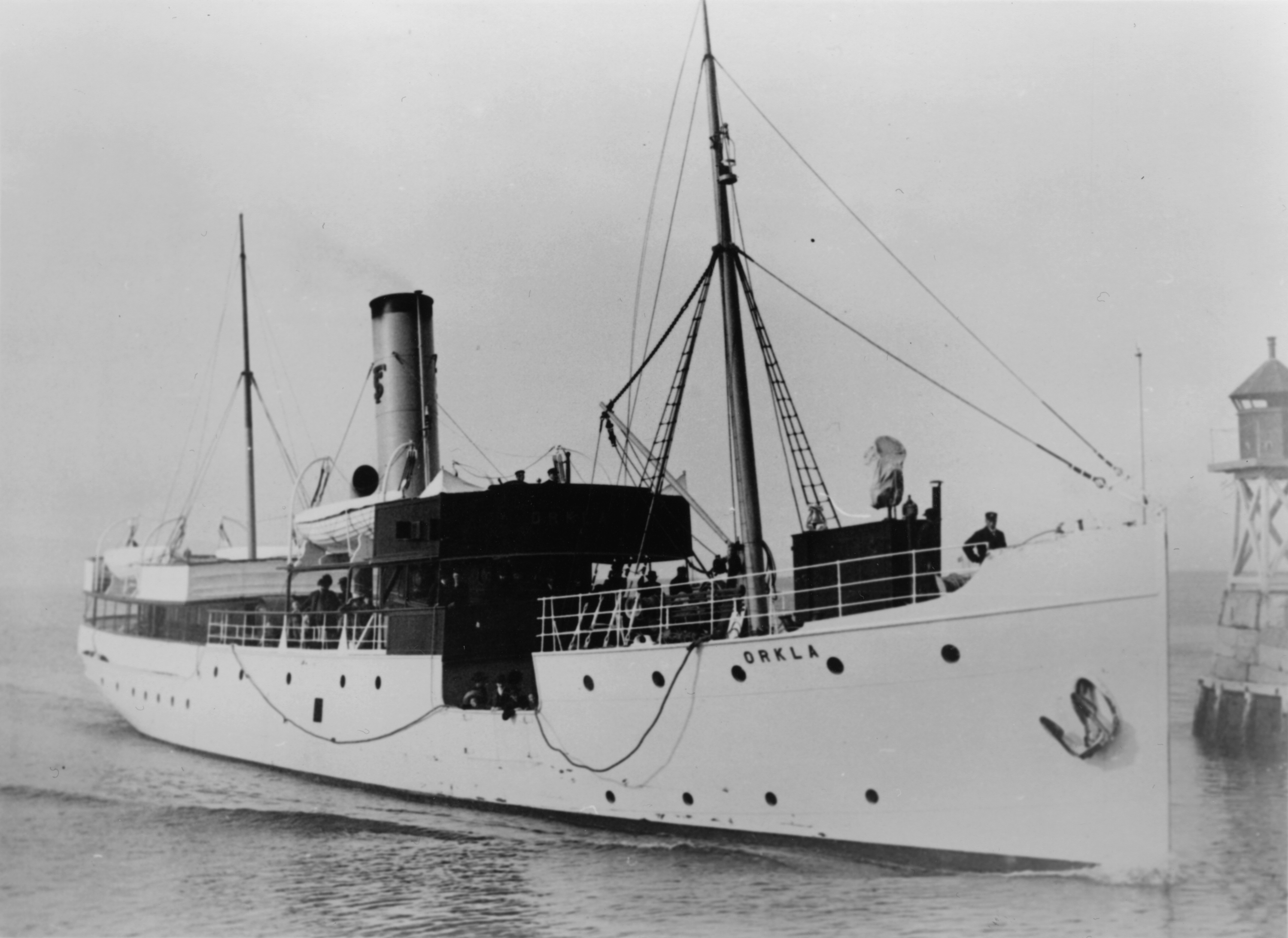

History
- Name: Orkla
- Operator: Chr. Salvesen & Chr. Thams's Communications Aktieselskab
- Port of registry: Norway
- Completed: 1908

General characteristics
- Length: 35 m (115 ft)
- Beam: 6 m (20 ft)
- Installed power: 2,700 kW steam engine
- Speed: 13 knots
- Capacity: 342 passengers

SS Orkla was a 173-tonne (170-long-ton; 191-short-ton) steam ship that operated the historic line between Thamshavn in Orkanger and Trondheim in the Trondheim Fjord in Norway between 1908 and 1949. It was built at Trondheims Mekaniske Verksted in Trondheim and went into operation at the same time as the railway line Thamshavn Line opened between Thamshavn and Løkken Verk. It operated two round trips each day and was owned by Chr. Salvesen & Chr. Thams's Communications Aktieselskab, who also owned the railway.

When it was delivered it was the fastest (making 13 knots on the test run) and one of the grandest local boats in the country and was nicknamed "the Trondheim Fjord's white swan". During World War I the ship reduced its operations to one daily round trip due to lack of coal, and was run partly on sawdust. In the 1920s the ship got competition from bus routes on the stretch Trondheim - Orkanger, soon to be operated by the sister company Trondhjem-Orkladal Billag, and throughout the 1920s and 1930s the line lost a lot of traffic. During World War II Orkla had more passengers again, but after the war the number of passengers decreased sharply and in 1949 there were no longer enough passengers or goods to sustain the route. A freight route was kept up until 1959 with the smaller motor boat MS Elna.

Orkla was sold to a Belgian company, and was supposed to be used on the river Congo. However, there seems to be no record of her going there. She was sailed across the Atlantic, and in 1962 she was seen by a Norwegian ship's engineer in Talara, Peru.
