= Løkken Mine =

Mine in Trøndelag, Norway

Coordinates: 63°07′19″N 9°42′05″E

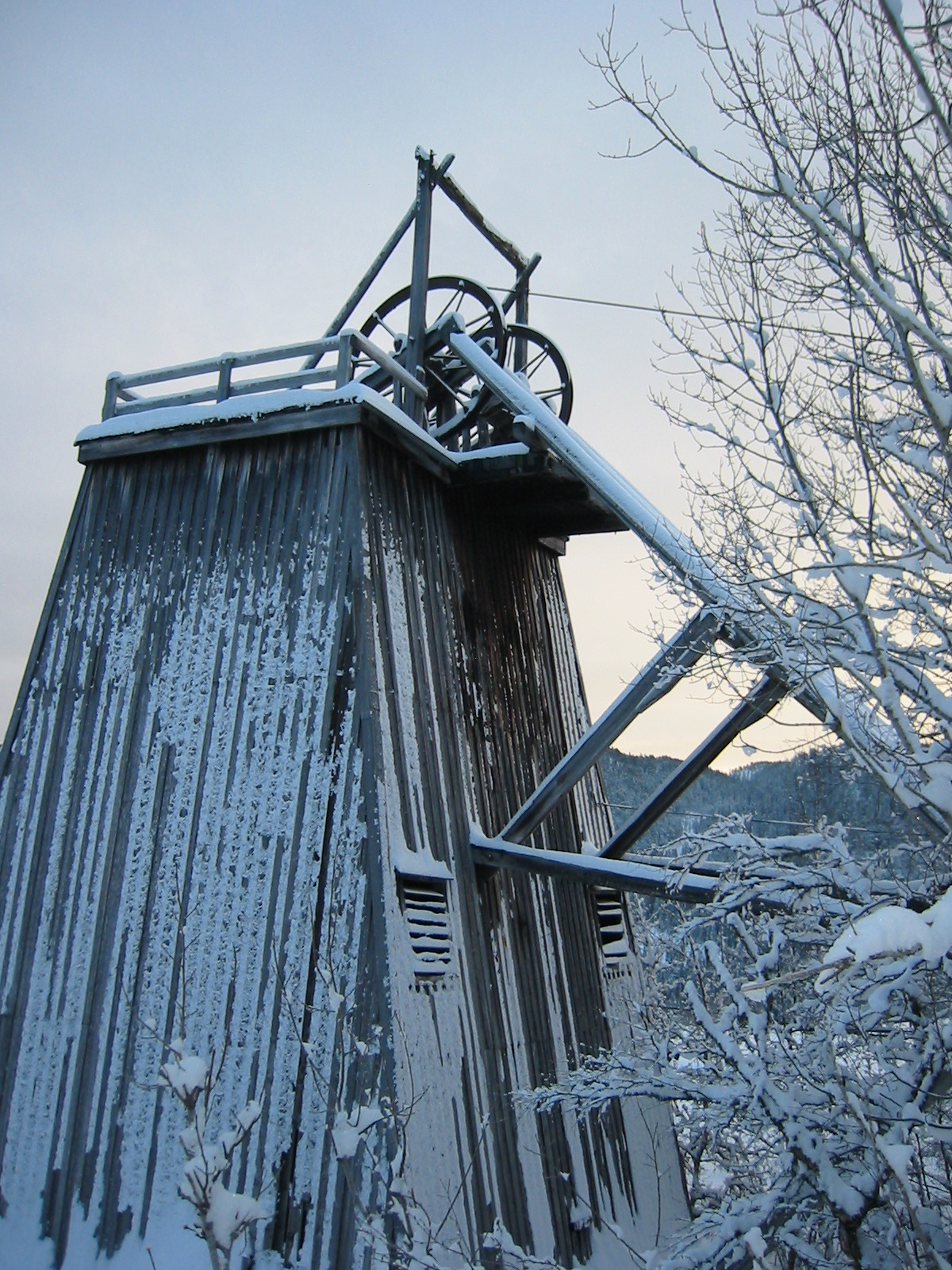
Old mine shaft leading down to the Løkken Mine.

The Løkken Mine is an underground pyrite mine located in the present-day Orkland Municipality in Trøndelag, Norway. The mine was operative from 1654 to 1987, located in the mining community Løkken Verk. It contained the largest deposits of its kind in Norway.

== History ==
From 1654-1904, the mine used traditional mining methods, focusing on the mining of copper only. Between 1654 and 1845, a total of 11,300 tonnes (11,100 long tons; 12,500 short tons) of copper was produced from the mine.

From 1904-1987, the mine switched to modern, large-scale production of ore. The mine was taken over by the company Orkla Grube-Aktiebolag. Electricity was added to the mine. From 1904 until 1987 a total of 24,000,000 tonnes (24,000,000 long tons; 26,000,000 short tons) of pyrite was produced from the mine. In addition to sulfur, the pyrite contained about 2% copper, in addition to zinc, and traces of silver and gold.

The products were originally transported to the sea by horse and sledge during winter time. From 1908, the ore was transported by the Thamshavn Line, which was the first electrical railway line in Norway. A smelting plant was located in Thamshavn. The annual production of the mine was about 350,000 tonnes (340,000 long tons; 390,000 short tons) of ore during its final years.

Since its closure in 1987, the mine is owned by the Orkla Group and it is now a museum.
