= Thamshavn Line =

Historic railroad in Trøndelag, Norway

Coordinates: 63.3118°N 9.8637°E

Norwegian: Thamshavnbanen
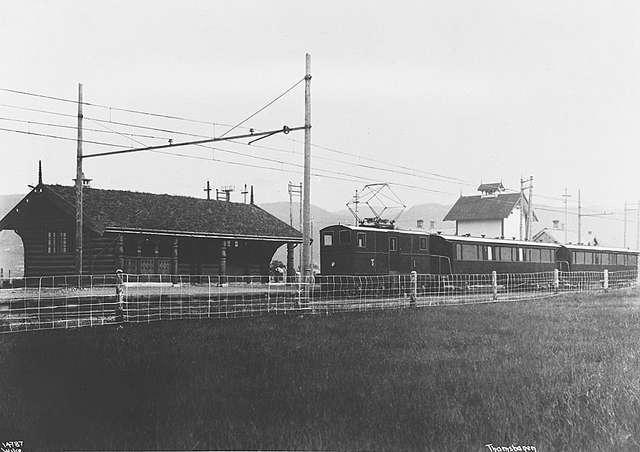
- Passenger train at Bårdshaug Station in 1912
- Locale: Norway

Commercial operations
- Built by: Salvesen & Thams
- Original gauge: 1,000 mm (3 ft 3 3/8 in) metre gauge
- Original electrification: 6.6 kV 25 Hz AC

Preserved operations
- Owned by: Salvesen & Thams
- Operated by: Salvesen & Thams
- Preserved gauge: 1,000 mm (3 ft 3 3/8 in)
- Preserved electrification: 6.6 kV 25 Hz AC

Commercial history
- Opened: 1908
- Closed: 1974

The Thamshavn Line (Norwegian: Thamshavnbanen) was Norway's first electric railway, running from 1908 to 1974 in what is now Trøndelag county. Today it is operated as a heritage railway and is the world's oldest railway running on its original alternating current electrification scheme, using 6.6 kV 25 Hz AC. It was built to transport pyrites from the mines at Løkken Verk to the port at Thamshavn, as well as passengers. There were six stations: Thamshavn, Orkanger, Bårdshaug, Fannrem, Solbusøy and Svorkmo. The tracks were extended to Løkken Verk in 1910.

It is Scandinavia's only railway with a rail gauge of 1,000 mm (3 ft 3 3/8 in), though the nearby Trondheim Tramway also features this gauge. It is the world's only railway with this combination of gauge and electrical equipment. The total length of the railway was 25.15 kilometres (15.6 mi). The conveyance of passengers ended in 1963, but the transport of ore continued until 1974. In 1983, parts of the railway were reopened as a heritage railway.

== History ==
=== Christian Thams goes electric ===
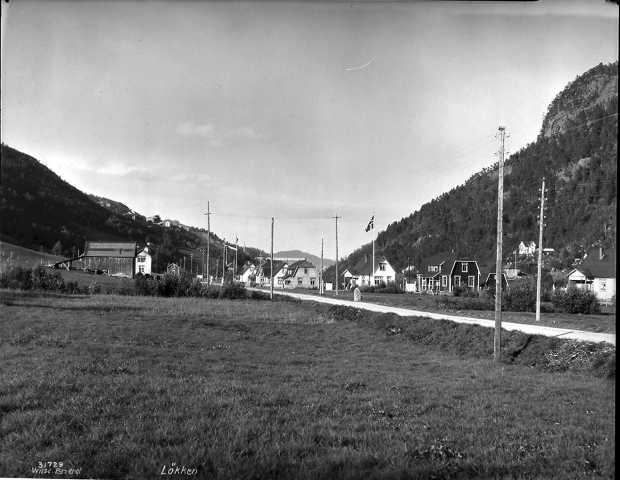
Through Løkken

Mining at Løkken Verk had its roots back to 1633 when King Christian IV of Denmark–Norway had opened the mine. At this time all mining was a privilege of the king. Later, in the 1800s, the mine was privatised and owned by Løkken Kobber og Kisværks Interessentskab. In 1868 the local farmer and sawmill owner Wilhelm A. Thams and his accountant Christian Salvesen from Leith, Scotland founded the mining company Ørkedals Mining Company and bought a number of small mines around Løkken. In the early 1880s Wilhelm's grandson, Christian Thams returned from Switzerland and took over the running of the mining company. He realised that to make money from mining, he had to purchase the largest mine of the all, but didn't succeed until 1896 when it no longer was feasible to manually pump out the water, and bought Løkken Mine.

Christian Thams understood that for the mine to continue operation, there had to be built an electric water pump in the mines. He also understood that it would then be feasible to build an electric railway between the mine and the port at Thamshavn were the pyrites were shipped out, primarily to Germany. While Thams went abroad to get capital for the new mining company, Norwegian law required that permits to operate railways and power plants only were given to Norwegians. To solve this, a separate company, Chr. Salvesen & Chr. Thams's Communications Aktieselskab (Salvesen & Thams or S&T) was established in 1898 to build the railway, operate the steam ship SS Orkla between Thamshavn and Trondheim and build the power plant at Skjenaldfossen. By 1904 the mining company had acquired the majority of stocks in S&T and soon owned the entire company. The Orkla mining company has since evolved into the Orkla Group, a Forbes 500-company.

Land was, after some conflicts, acquired or expropriated and construction was started. The construction was completed in 1908 and employed between 200 and 300 people. Originally the plans were to only build the line from Thamshavn to Svorkmo while the stretch from Svorkmo to Løkken was to be operated by a cable car. But Thams soon realised that this was a mistake and decided to extend the line to Løkken. This caused some problems since he needed to get permission from the Ministry of the Interior and was not allowed to operate passenger traffic all the way to Løkken before 1910. The line between Thamshavn and Svorkmo was opened on 10 July 1908 by King Haakon VII while the last section to Løkken was opened on 15. August 1910 by Prime Minister Wollert Konow.

The railway got a unique combination of gauge and electric power. At the time of the construction standard gauge (1,435 mm (4 ft 8 1/2 in)) was common in Norway, but still the most common gauge, especially on industrial and branch lines, was narrow gauge. But the Thamshavn Line chose to not build the normal 1,067 mm (3 ft 6 in) gauge, but instead metre gauge (1,000 mm (3 ft 3 3/8 in)), a gauge only used one other place in Norway, on the Trondheim Tramway some 40 kilometres (25 mi) away. Since the railway was the first to be electrified in Norway there was no standard of electric current and so Thams chose the somewhat unusual 6.6 kV 25 Hz AC, while the rest of the Norwegian (and some other Northern European) railway networks chose 15 kV 16.7 Hz AC. Thams was venturing into an innovative area, since Benjamin G. Lamme had invented the alternating current electric locomotive in 1902 and there was no experience operating the system.

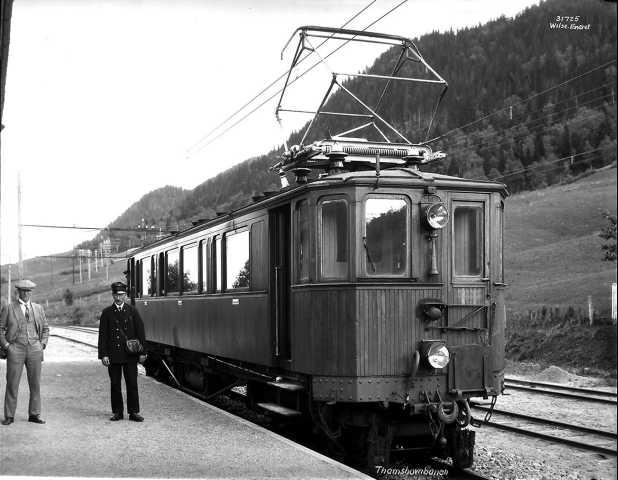
A railcar at Orkanger Station

=== Growth 1910-1940 ===
The export of pyrites was a gigantic success for Orkla, with both production and prices exceeding the estimates. During the economic difficult World War I the company replaced the tracks used 22.5 kilograms (50 lb) tracks with new 35 kilograms (77 lb) track in 1915. In 1916, two new locomotives were bought. Also the passenger and cargo traffic increased in the period, and in 1910 two more railcars were delivered. In 1935 the new smelting plant at Thamshavn (now Elkem Thamshavn) opened. As a supplement to the steam ship and passenger rail service, Salvesen & Thams also started operating connecting bus services. The first attempts failed in 1909 to establish a route between Svorkmo and Rindal Municipality and Surnadal Municipality. In 1918, a new bus route opened between Løkken and Aune in Oppdal Municipality, but shortened to Berkåk in 1921 when the Dovre Line opened. During the 1920s Salvesen & Thams established Trondhjem-Orkladal Billag and started operating a bus route from Thamshavn to Trondheim.

=== Sabotage ===
After the German invasion of Norway in 1940 during World War II the mines at Løkken became an important resource for the Germans. To avoid having to bomb the entire Thamshavn and Løkken areas, the Norwegian government-in-exile chose instead to sabotage key areas instead of large areas, of consideration the civilian population. While the mining company chose to cooperate with the Germans, but secretly not performed planned production increases, Company Linge performed a total of four sabotage actions against the Thamshavn Line, led by Peter Deinboll. The first targeted the transformer station that was successfully blown up on 4 May 1942. But it was quickly rebuilt by the Germans and a new sabotage was necessary. In autumn 1943 the idea was to blow up the lift in the mine, but instead the group decided to blow up the locomotives on the railway. On 31 October, four locomotives and one rail car were blown up. This was not enough for the Deinboll, and an attempt to hijack a train at Klingliene and blow up part of the rail at the same stop failed, killing the saboteur Odd Nilsen.

In the spring of 1944 the saboteurs returned and on 9 May blew up a train at Hongslomælen and again on 31 May at the same place when the last rail car was blown up. In response to this the Germans acquired two steam engines from Germany with the right gauge, but the saboteurs didn't succeed at blowing them up. To avoid a shortage of rolling stock, the Germans used slave labour from Fannrem concentration camp to rebuild the system to a dual gauge with both standard and metre gauge, in an attempt to use rolling stock from the Dovre Line (that used standard gauge) while keeping the cars that used metre gauge. Although the entire line was rebuilt, no standard gauge locomotives were acquired and the third rail was taken away after the war.

=== The end of an era ===
The first part of the closing of the line was the attempt to get rid of the requirement to operate passenger trains. The original permit to operate the line included a requirement to operate passenger transport on the line, but as early as the 1930s the company tried to get rid of this obligation. But it was not until 1963 that passenger traffic was terminated. By then the company had managed to convince the authorities that a bus route would be more suitable on the stretch between Orkanger and Løkken.

By the 1970s the production at the mine was falling so much that it had become uneconomical to operate the railway, and on 29 May 1974 the railway was taken out of service. Part of the reason was the need for new locomotives, but the small production at the mine couldn't justify the necessary investments. In the 66 years of operation the Thamshavn Line carried 7,441,012 passengers, 1,069,750 tonnes of freight and 16,720,047 tonnes of ore.

=== Heritage ===
In 1973, the Norwegian Railway Association tried to open a heritage railway, but failed as Orkla wanted to keep the railway in case of future reopening for industry; as a compromise the association was given one of the railcars. No reopening occurred, and in 1983 the Orkla Industrial Museum and local enthusiasts opened the heritage railway, at first between Løkken and Svorkmo. In 1986, the trains were extended to Solbusøy, and four years later Fannrem. Since 2006, it has been possible to ride the train down to Bårdshaug, and the current length of the railway is approximately 22 kilometres (14 mi). Only the last few kilometres of line have been removed. The vintage railway operates from May to September, with 11,812 passengers in 2008.

Representatives for every locomotive generation are preserved on the heritage railway. Currently locomotives 2 (1908), 4 (1908), 5II (1950), 8 (1917) and 10II (1952) are in serviceable condition. The passenger car fleet consists of three of the four original carriages (9, 10 and 11) and one dinner car (built 1995).

== Rolling stock ==
The first locomotive that was used on the line was Kvenna (the Coffee Grinder), a steam locomotive that had been bought from the Nesttun–Os Railway and converted from 750 mm (2 ft 5 1/2 in) to the 1,000 mm (3 ft 3 3/8 in) metre gauge. In 1918 it was attempted to sell the locomotive to the Trondheim Tramway, the only other metre gauge railway in Scandinavia, but it is not known if the sale was successful. One more steam engine was bought from the German manufacturer Borsig. The line initially bought three electric locomotives from Elektrisk Bureau, who also delivered the transformers and overhead lines. The locomotives were based on a design from British Westinghouse. At the same time there was delivered a rail car, named the King's car since the king had ridden in it during the opening of the line.

The next order came in 1910 for two new rail cars and in 1916 for two new locomotives from ASEA at 420 kW, with an additional 12 pyrites cars in 1929-31 and 20 during the war. The company also bought a used Orenstein & Koppel steam engine from the zinc mines in Odda Municipality in 1939 and during the war two Germany steam engines were transferred from Deutsche Reichsbahn.

During and after the war there was used a lot of energy on rebuilding the locomotives that had been sabotaged. The three Westinghouse locomotives were rebuilt to two. In addition, three new locomotives were delivered from Skabo in 1950. The last steam engine was retired in 1953. In 1952 two diesel shunting engines were delivered from Ruston & Hornsby.

Three of the original passenger cars delivered to the opening in 1908 are still in use on the heritage railway. The last one, no. 12, has been regauged and used on the heritage Setesdal Line since the 1970s. Some freightcars still exist, including a dozen ore cars, but none are in serviceable condition.

Electric locomotive No. 3 Ohma Electra. The locomotive was used on the Thamshavn Line from 1908 until the 1950s. In 1972 it was moved to Trondheim and displayed at the Norwegian University of Science and Technology

No.	Built	Delivered	Retired	Type	Factory	Axel
Kvenna	1893	1907	1917	Steam	?	B 1'Tn2
1	1908	1908	1943	Electric	British Westinghouse	Bo' Bo'
2	1908	1908	1963	Electric	British Westinghouse	Bo' Bo'
3	1908	1908	1963	Electric	British Westinghouse	Bo' Bo'
4	1908	1908		Rail car	United Electric	Bo' 2'
9	1909	1909	1947	Steam	Borsig	C Tn2
5	1910	1910	1943	Rail car	AEG/Skabo	Bo' Bo'
6	1910	1910	1944	Rail car	AEG/Skabo	Bo' Bo'
7	1918	1918		Electric	ASEA	B' B'
8	1918	1918		Electric	ASEA	B' B'
10	1928	1939	1943	Steam	Orenstein & Koppel	B Tn2
11	1921	1942	1947	Steam	Corpet-Louvet	B Tn2
12	1921	1942	1947	Steam	Corpet-Louvet	B Tn2
13	1921	1942	1947	Steam	Corpet-Louvet	B Tn2
14	1921	1942	1947	Steam	Corpet-Louvet	B Tn2
15	1921	1942	1950	Steam	Corpet-Louvet	B Tn2
99.221	1930	1944	1953	Steam	BMAG (Schwartzkopff)	1'E1'Th2
99.223	1930	1944	1947	Steam	BMAG (Schwartzkopff)	1'E1'Th2
1 II	1950	1950		Electric	Brown Boveri/Skabo	Bo' Bo'
5 II	1950	1950		Electric	Brown Boveri/Skabo	Bo
6 II	1950	1950		Electric	Brown Boveri/Skabo	Bo
9 II	1952	1952		Diesel	Ruston & Hornsby	Cmd
10 II	1952	1952		Diesel	Ruston & Hornsby	Cmd

== See also ==
- Narrow gauge railways in Norway
