= Svorkmo =

Village in Orkland Municipality, Norway

- Village
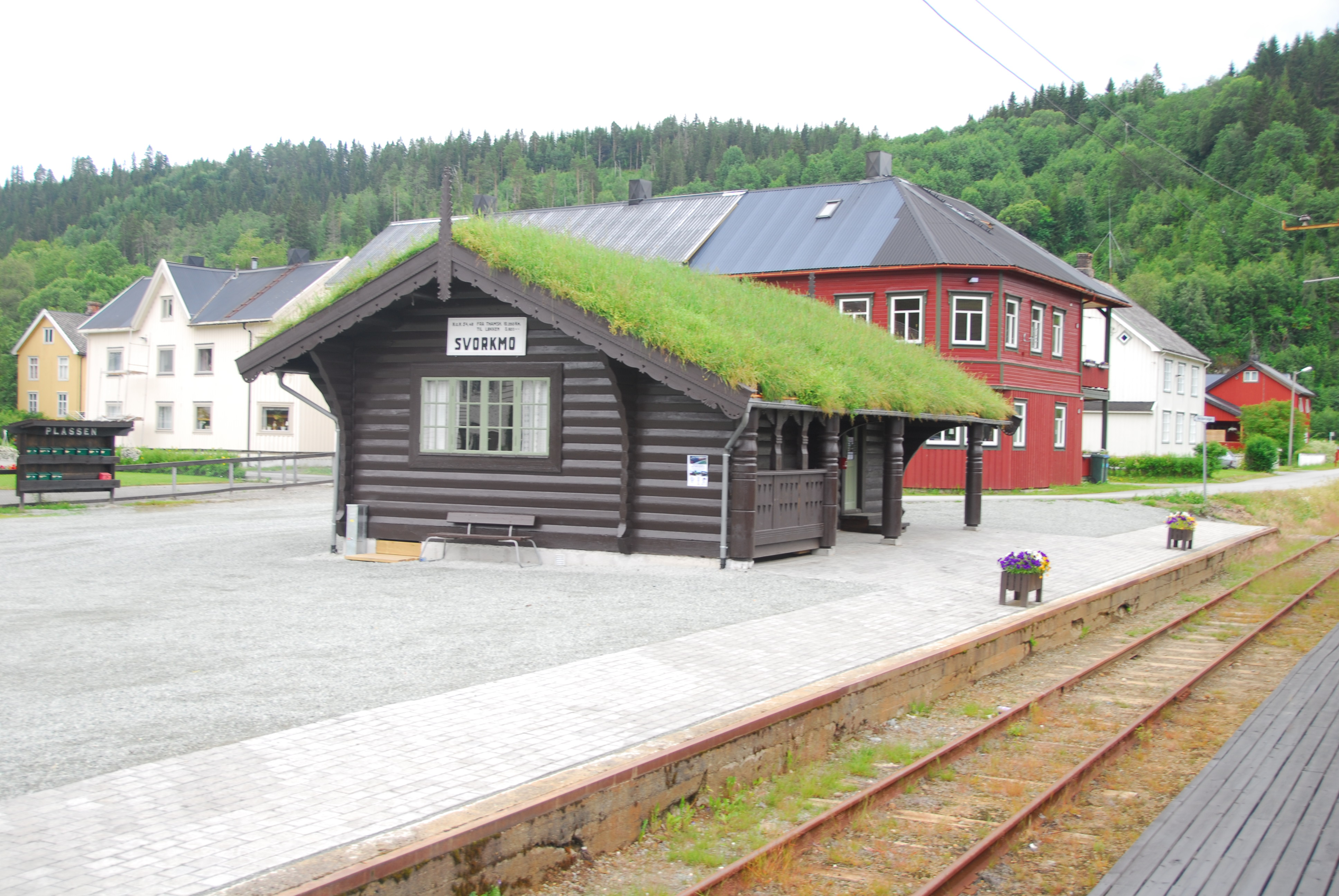
- View of the train station in the village
- Interactive map of Svorkmo
- Location within Trøndelag Location within Norway
- Coordinates: 63.1697°N 09.7425°E
- Country: Norway
- Region: Central Norway
- County: Trøndelag
- District: Orkdalen
- Municipality: Orkland Municipality

Area
  - Total: 0.26 km^{2} (0.10 sq mi)
- Elevation: 48 m (157 ft)

Population (2024)
  - Total: 291
  - Density: 1,119/km^{2} (2,900/sq mi)
- Time zone: UTC+01:00 (CET)
  - Summer (DST): UTC+02:00 (CEST)
- Post Code: 7327 Svorkmo

Svorkmo is a village in Orkland Municipality in Trøndelag county, Norway. It is situated in the Orkdalen valley along the river Orkla about 60 kilometres (37 mi) west-southwest of the city of Trondheim. Svorkmo is located about 3.5 kilometres (2.2 mi) south of the village of Vormstad and about 11 kilometres (6.8 mi) south of the urban area of Orkanger-Fannrem-Råbygda. The lake Svorksjøen lies about 7 kilometres (4.3 mi) to the east of the village.

For about 100 years beginning in the 17th century, Svorkmo was an industrial centre of major importance. It was in Svorkmo that the Løkken copper mine's smelters were situated. Many people worked in the smelting works and the industry formed the base of one of Norway's largest non-city communities, with hotels, bakeries, saw mills, and the Svorkmo Station (a railway station which still exists, though now only as a museum).

Today Svorkmo is no more than a small village with few facilities (little more than a supermarket and a campsite) and the people who live there work elsewhere. Svorkmo is a classic example of the effects of the centralization on the Norwegian economy. The 0.26-square-kilometre (64-acre) village has a population (2024) of 291 and a population density of 1,119 inhabitants per square kilometre (2,900/sq mi).
