= Forbes 500 =

Annual list of large companies

The Forbes 500 was an annual listing of the top 500 American companies produced by Forbes magazine. The list was calculated by combining five factors: sales, profits, assets, market value, and employees. The list was last issued in March 2003 (based on 2002 data for the companies); it is no longer calculated each year and has been replaced by the Forbes Global 2000, which includes non-U.S. companies but is calculated on a similar basis as the old Forbes 500 (although it does not include employees).

== Quantifying the largest companies ==
Various methods exist in determining the largest corporations. Forbes Magazine, for example, takes into consideration profit, revenue, market capitalization, and value of assets when ranking companies by size; the magnitude of any one of these factors alone may not necessarily be indicative of a firm's overall ranking.

The value of a firm's assets is typically derived from a company's ability to generate cash via its ownership and control of inputs and/or distribution of the final product. Banks and financial institutions, for example, tend to have a large number of assets due to loans and investments, however, a large portion of these do not actually belong to the firm since these assets are customers' deposits.

Fortune 500 ranks companies by revenue. This method is heavily biased towards distributors such as Walmart, which may have a high volume of sales but may be operating on very thin profit margins.

Another method might be to look at the market capitalization of the company. However, this price is dictated by the perceived value of the company and its prospects. At one point in the late nineties, Cisco Systems would have been the biggest company by this measure, however the dot-com bubble crash reduced its perceived value dramatically. Another example would be Amazon.com, which despite being barely profitable, has a very large market cap rivaling or exceeded established American companies due to the general market sentiment about its innovations.

== See also ==
- Forbes Global 2000
- Fortune 500
- List of largest employers
- List of largest companies by revenue
- List of corporations by market capitalization
