= Wilhelm August Thams =

Norwegian merchant, land owner and lumber mill owner

Wilhelm August Thams (22 June 1812 – 4 July 1884) was a Norwegian merchant, land owner and lumber mill owner.

== Biography ==
Wilhelm Thams was the son of Jacob Thullin Thams (1770–1826), who was a bailiff in Ringerike. He was married to Ida Olava Mandskow (1812–1889) and was the father of Marentius Thams (1836–1907) and grandfather of Christian Thams (1867–1948).

In 1859, he relocated from Fredrikstad in Østfold where he had sawmill operations and settled in Trondheim. In 1867, Wilhelm Thams built a sawmill and established a small port which became known as Thamshavn on a side inlet of Trondheimsfjord. Thams built a large company and bought forested properties within the Orkdalen valley in Sør-Trøndelag. He established a timber trading company, Strandheim Brug, which his son Marentius would develop to become the largest such company in Norway. In 1868, in cooperation with ship owner Christian Salvesen, he established the Ørkedals Mining Company to develop mining interest in the area around Løkken in Meldal Municipality.

== Other sources ==
- Støren, R. (1954). Løkken Verk 1654–1904 (in Norwegian). Orkla Grube-Aktiebolag. pp. 131–132.

== Related Reading ==
- Strandheim Brug
