= Løkken Verk =

Village in Orkland Municipality, Norway

Løkken Verk Løkken
- Village
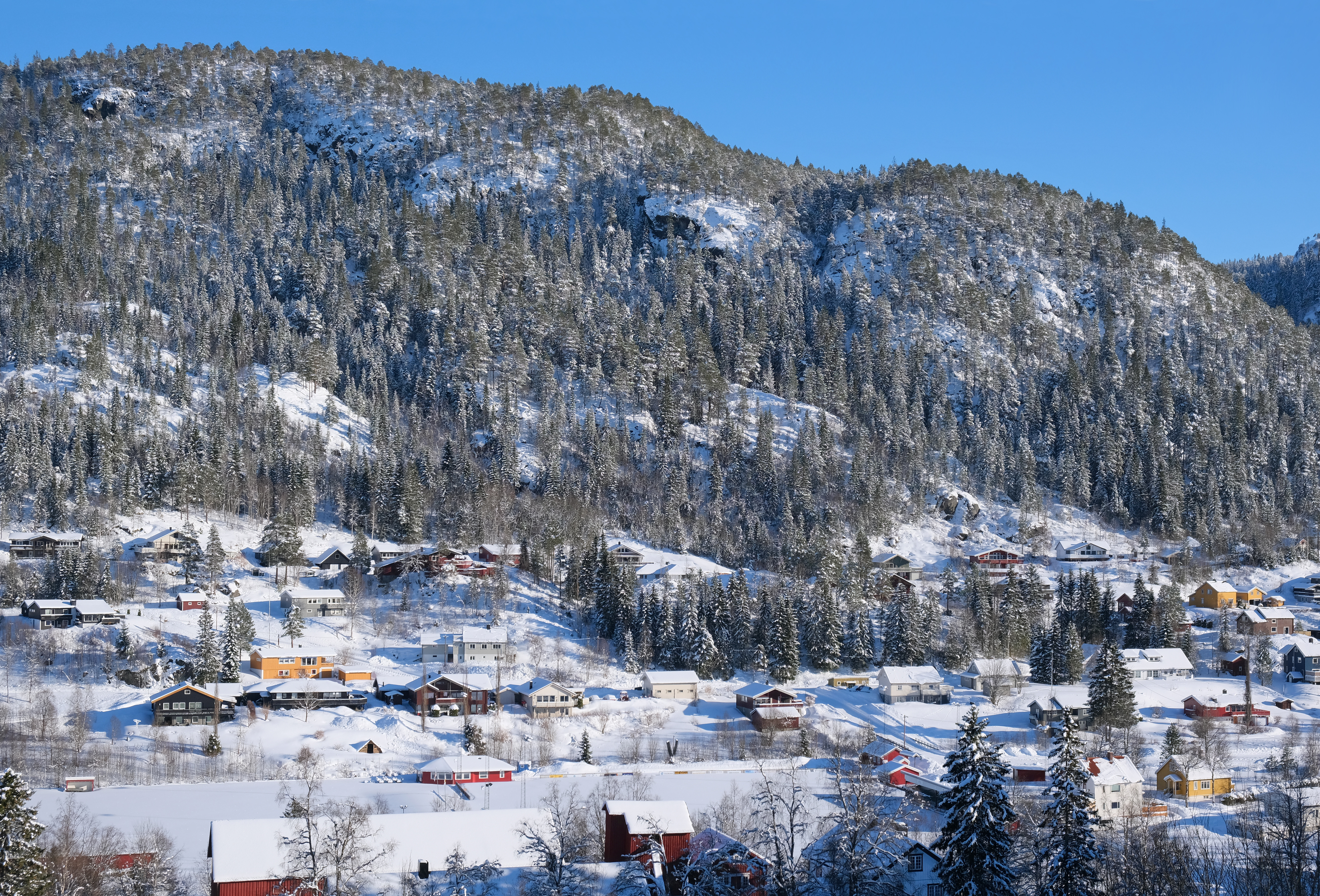
- View of the town
- Interactive map of Løkken Verk
- Location within Trøndelag Location within Norway
- Coordinates: 63.1258°N 09.7052°E
- Country: Norway
- Region: Central Norway
- County: Trøndelag
- District: Orkdalen
- Municipality: Orkland Municipality

Area
  - Total: 1.64 km^{2} (0.63 sq mi)
- Elevation: 166 m (545 ft)

Population (2024)
  - Total: 1,293
  - Density: 788/km^{2} (2,040/sq mi)
- Time zone: UTC+01:00 (CET)
  - Summer (DST): UTC+02:00 (CEST)
- Post Code: 7332 Løkken Verk

Løkken Verk (or simply Løkken) is a village in Orkland Municipality in Trøndelag county, Norway. It is located 5 kilometres (3.1 mi) south of the village of Svorkmo, 2 kilometres (1.2 mi) east of the village of Bjørnli, and 10 kilometres (6.2 mi) north of the municipal center of Meldal.

The 1.64-square-kilometre (410-acre) village has a population (2024) of 1,293 and a population density of 788 inhabitants per square kilometre (2,040/sq mi).

== History ==
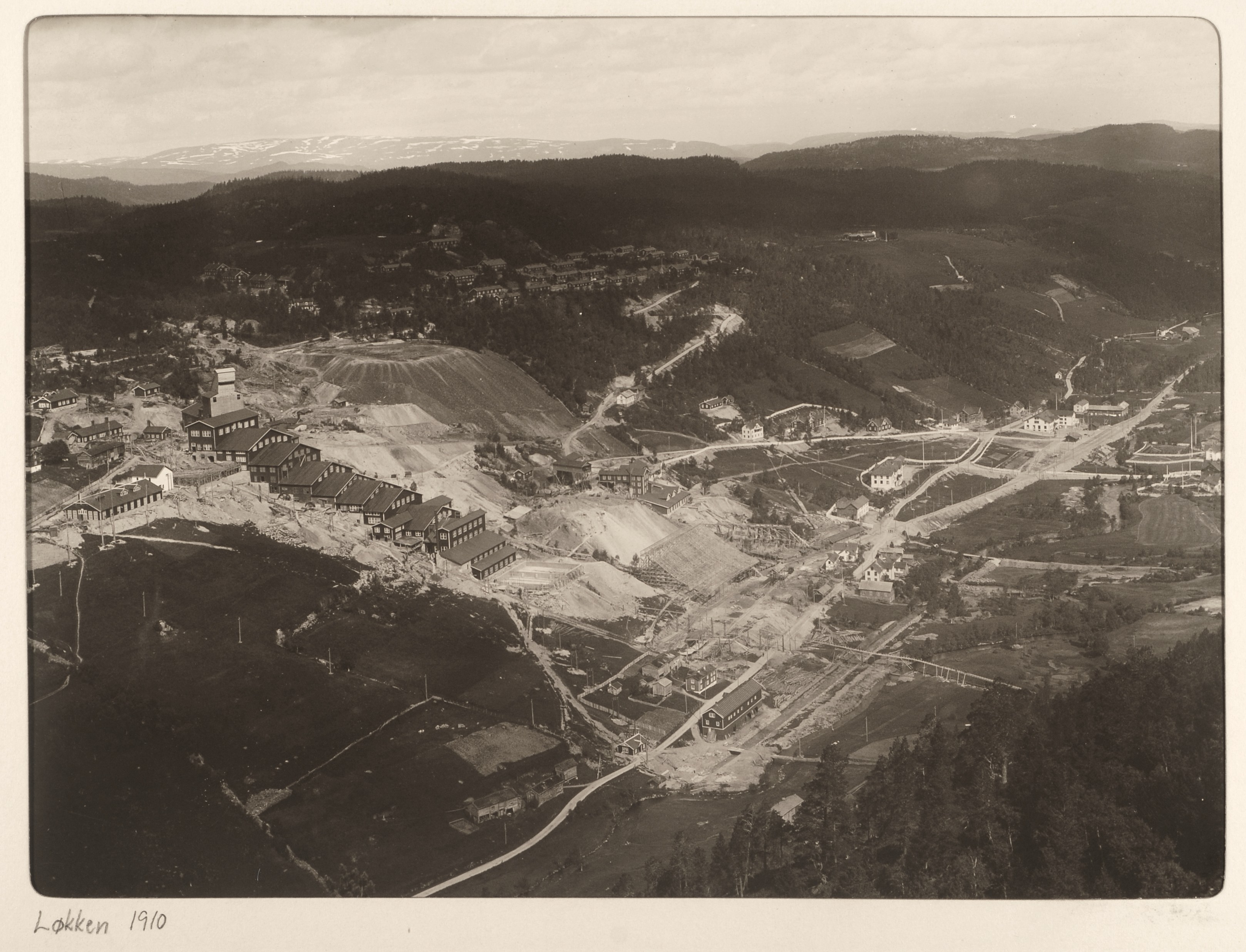
View of Løkken Verk (c. 1910)

Løkken Verk was originally populated when the Løkken Mine started mining for copper in 1654. The name comes from a farm at the place. The ore findings at Løkken Verk were originally about 30,000,000 tonnes (33,000,000 tons), and was the largest resource of copper sulfide in Norway. There was mining at Løkken from 1654 until 1987. Prior to 1845, the target was copper that was smelted, but in 1851 the mine transferred into mining pyrites that were exported, primarily as raw material for sulfuric acid. From 1931 until 1962, sulfur and copper were produced at Orkla Metal in Thamshavn. The history of the mining is preserved at Orkla Industrial Museum at Løkken Verk.

In 1904, the mining operation was taken over by Christian Thams and Orkla Grube-Aktiebolag, this group has evolved into the Forbes 500-company Orkla Group. At the same time, the Thamshavnbanen railway was built between Løkken Verk and Thamshavn (just north of Orkanger) to transport the pyrites to the port.
