= Thamshavn =

Village in Orkland Municipality, Norway

- Village
- Tamshamn
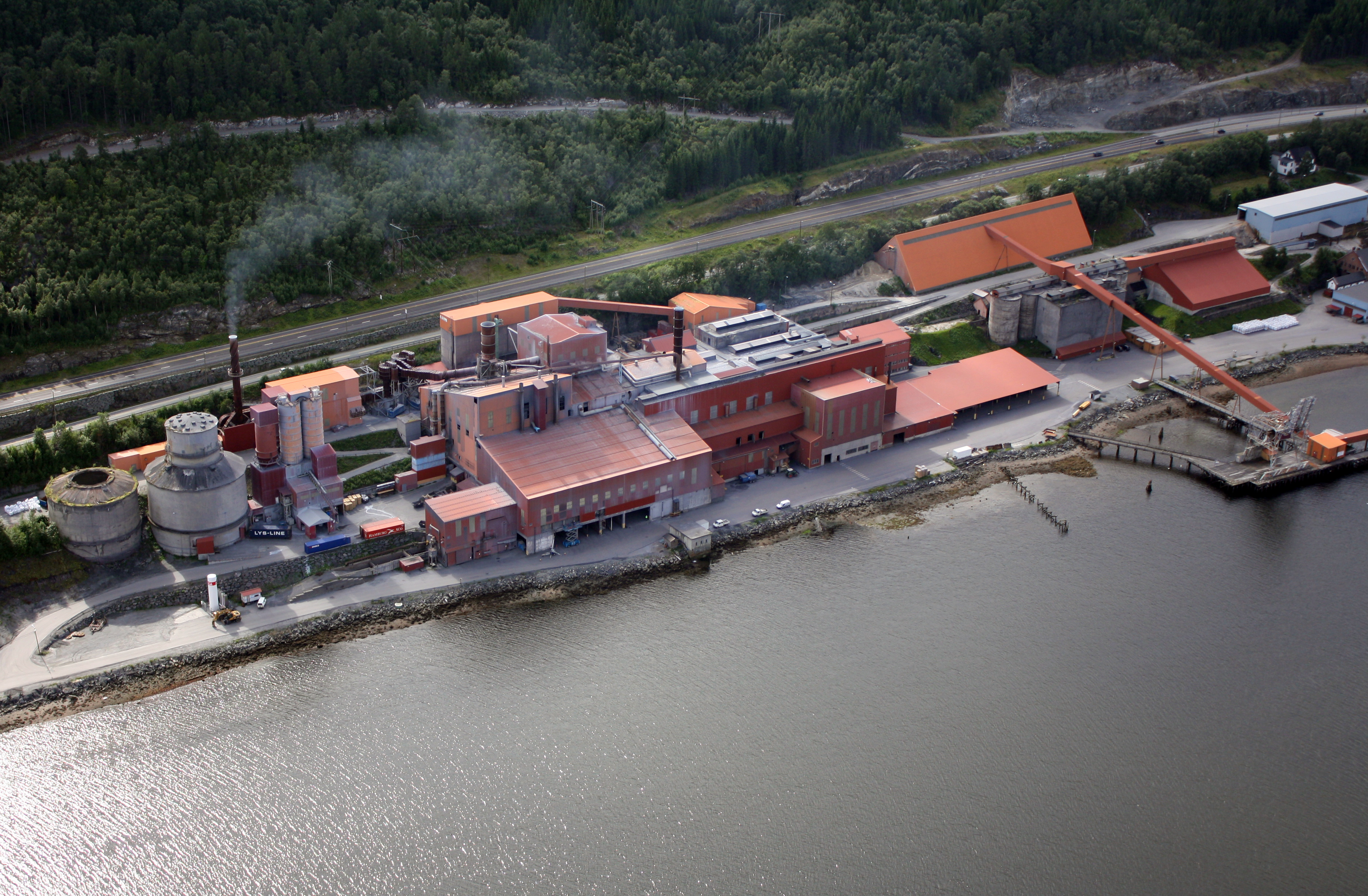
- Elkem Thamshavn
- Interactive map of Thamshavn
- Location within Trøndelag Location within Norway
- Coordinates: 63.3186°N 09.8766°E
- Country: Norway
- Region: Central Norway
- County: Trøndelag
- District: Orkdalen
- Municipality: Orkland Municipality
- Elevation: 11 m (36 ft)
- Time zone: UTC+01:00 (CET)
  - Summer (DST): UTC+02:00 (CEST)
- Post Code: 7300 Orkanger

Thamshamn or Thamshavn is a small port village in Orkland Municipality in Trøndelag county, Norway. It is the site of the port for the town of Orkanger and the ferrosilicon plant Elkem Thamshavn. It is located right along European route E39 and the Thamshavn Station, which was the terminus of the Thamshavn railway.

== History ==
Thamshavn came into being in 1867 when the local farmer Wilhelm August Thams established a sawmill on the area that was named after him. He and his son Christian Thams bought the Løkken Mine at Løkken Verk in 1904 and decided to build a railway from the mine to Thamshavn where they could ship out the pyrites to continental Europe. At the same time the steam ship D/S Orkla started operating between Thamshavn and Trondheim.

In 1931, Orkla Metall (now Elkem Thamshavn) was established by the Orkla Mining Company to smelt the pyrites to sulfur and copper. During World War II, Thamshavn was one of the targets for the Thamshavnbanen sabotage. Today the mine is abandoned and the railway has been converted to a heritage railway, but the smelter and port still live on.

== Today ==
Thamshavn still has a working smelting plant that is owned by Elkem. The smelting plant employs about 130 people on a daily basis, producing silicon. Elkem Thamshavn is also known for its energy renewal program, reusing 20-25% of all energy used.
