= Orkanger =

Town in Trøndelag, Norway

- Town/City
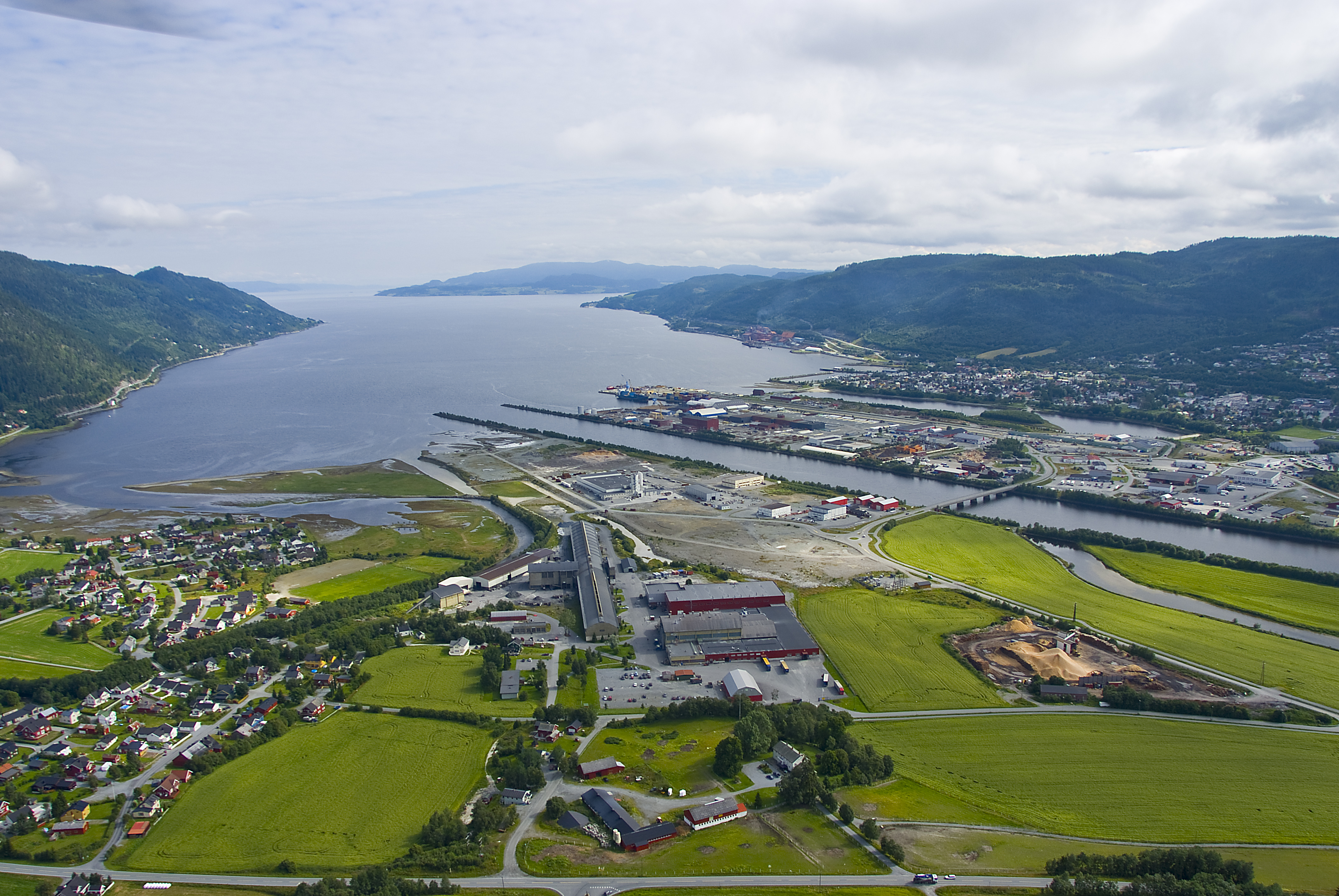
- View of the industrial area with the city in the background
- Interactive map of Orkanger
- Location within Trøndelag Location within Norway
- Coordinates: 63.3067°N 09.8502°E
- Country: Norway
- Region: Central Norway
- County: Trøndelag
- District: Orkdalen
- Municipality: Orkland Municipality
- Established as
- Town (By): 1 Jan 2014

Area
  - Total: 6.85 km^{2} (2.64 sq mi)
- Elevation: 11 m (36 ft)

Population (2024)
  - Total: 9,161
  - Density: 1,337/km^{2} (3,460/sq mi)
- Demonym: Ørbygg
- Time zone: UTC+01:00 (CET)
  - Summer (DST): UTC+02:00 (CEST)
- Post Code: 7300 Orkanger

Orkanger is a town and the administrative centre of Orkland Municipality in Trøndelag county, Norway. The town sits at the end of the Orkdal Fjord, an arm of the Trondheimsfjord. Orkanger is the commercial centre of Orkland Municipality and it is the site of the Orkanger Church. It was established as a "town" in 2014.

Combined with the neighbouring suburban village of Fannrem, the conurbation constitutes one of the largest urban areas in Trøndelag county. The 6.26-square-kilometre (1,550-acre) town has a population (2018) of 8,204 and a population density of 1,311 inhabitants per square kilometre (3,400/sq mi).

== Transportation ==
Just north of the center of Orkanger, lies the port of Thamshavn. Until 1974, Orkanger had a station on the Thamshavn Line railway with the Thamshavn Station just north of the town. The railway line closed for passenger traffic in 1963 but continued to transport ore from Løkken Verk to the Thamshavn port until 1974 when the line was closed to all traffic. The line through most of Orkanger was dismantled following the closure, but about 22 kilometres (14 mi) of the original line from Bårdshaug to Løkken Verk has been re-opened as a heritage railway.

Between 1908 and 1949 there was a steam ship service to Trondheim on the SS Orkla. The European route E39 highway runs through the town, connecting it to the major city of Trondheim, about 42 kilometres (26 mi) to the northeast.

== History ==
Historically, the village area that preceded the town of Orkanger was known as Orkdalsøra.

The area made up of the village of Orkdalsøra and the port of Thamshavn was established as Orkanger Municipality on 1 July 1920 when the large Orkdal Municipality was divided into three smaller municipalities: the northern urban port area (population: 1,715) became Orkanger Municipality, the southern part (population: 1,760) became Orkland Municipality, and the central area (population: 3,045) remained as Orkdal Municipality. Orkanger Municipality encompassed the 6.64-square-kilometre (2.56 sq mi) urban area and some of the surrounding countryside. It included an important port, but it did not have the designation of a town at that time.

During the 1960s, there were many municipal mergers across Norway due to the work of the Schei Committee. On 1 January 1963, Orkanger Municipality (population: 2,874) was merged with Orkdal Municipality (population: 4,152), Orkland Municipality (population: 1,707), and Geitastrand Municipality (population: 559) to form a new, larger Orkdal Municipality.

In 2014, the municipal council of Orkdal Municipality declared the urban area of Orkanger to be a "town".

=== Name ===
The town is named "Orkanger", a name that was created in 1920 when Orkanger Municipality was established. The first element is Ork, which stems from the lake Orkelsjøen from which the river Orkla runs. The meaning of the name is of the lake and river is not certain. The last element is angr which means "inlet" or "small fjord".

== Industry ==
Orkanger is one of the most important industrial centres in Trøndelag. The industrial sites are mainly located in the Grønøra area, just west of the mouth of the Orkla river. Technip Offshore Norge AS, Reinertsen, Washington Mills and the foundry Elkem Thamshavn are the main operators in the area.

A chipboard factory operated in Orkanger from 1959 until 1976.

== Media gallery ==
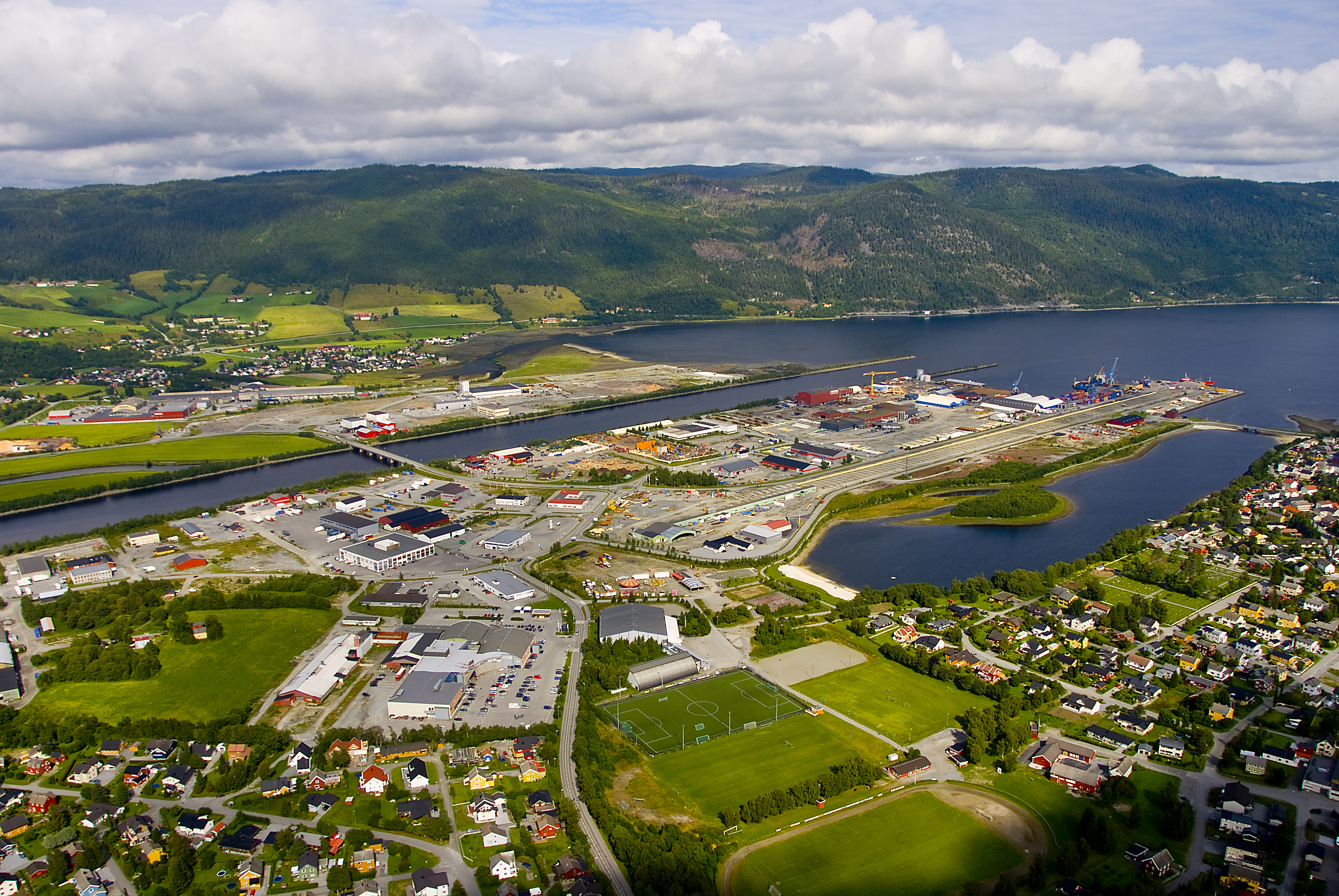
Orkanger seen towards northwest. By Åge Hojem, Trondheim havn.

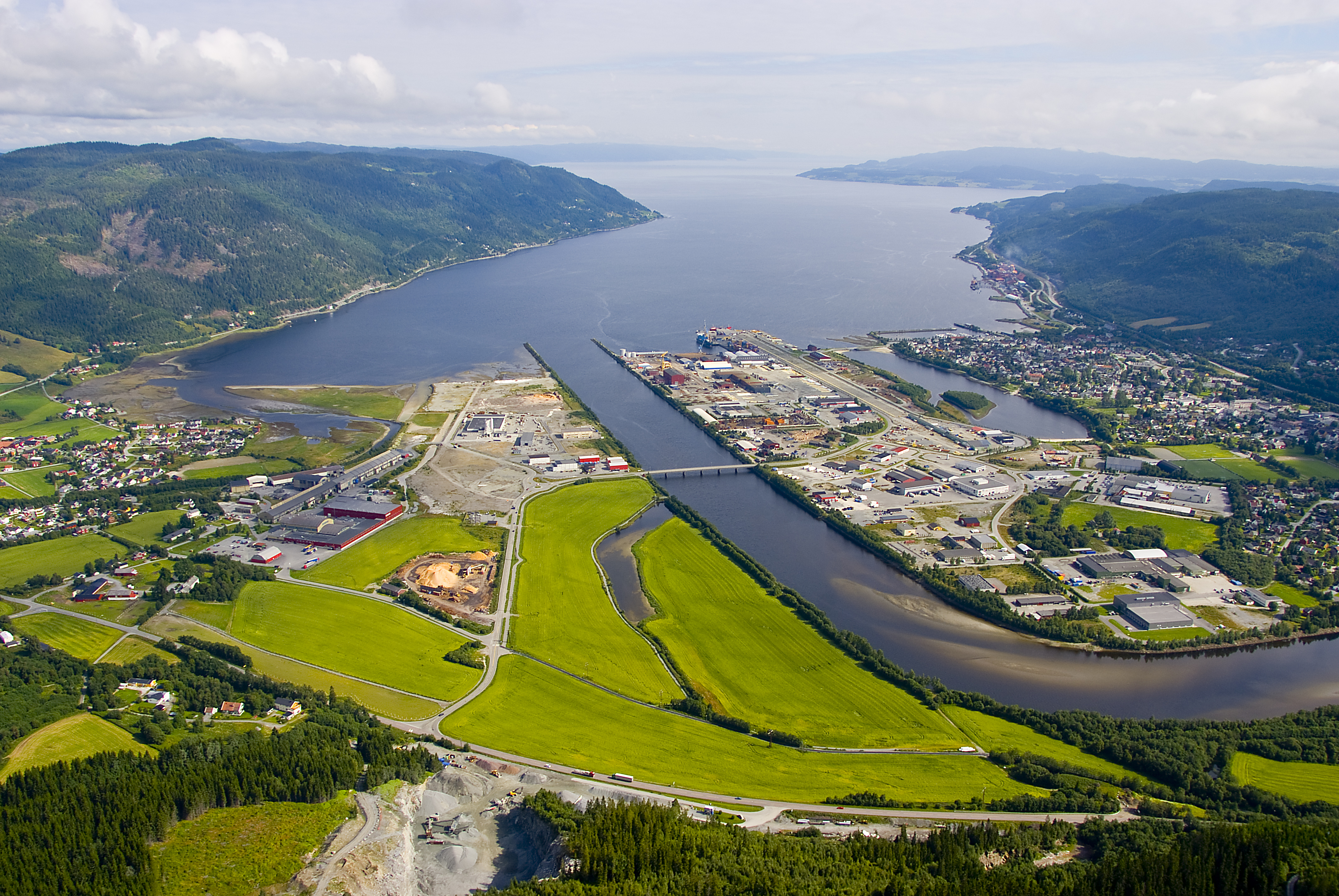
Orkanger seen towards north, with Orkdal Fjord in the background. By Åge Hojem, Trondheim havn.

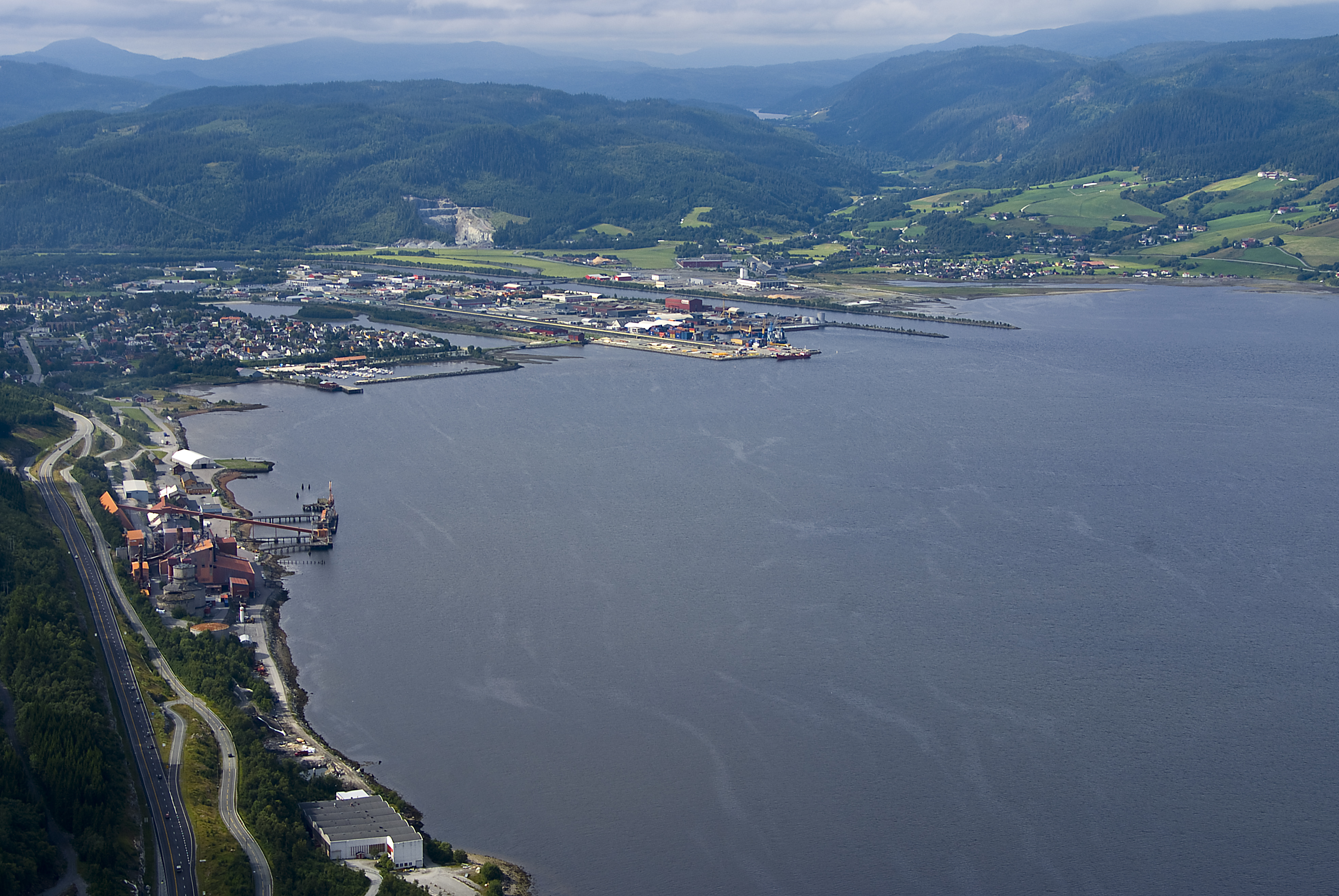
Orkanger seen towards southwest. By Åge Hojem, Trondheim havn.

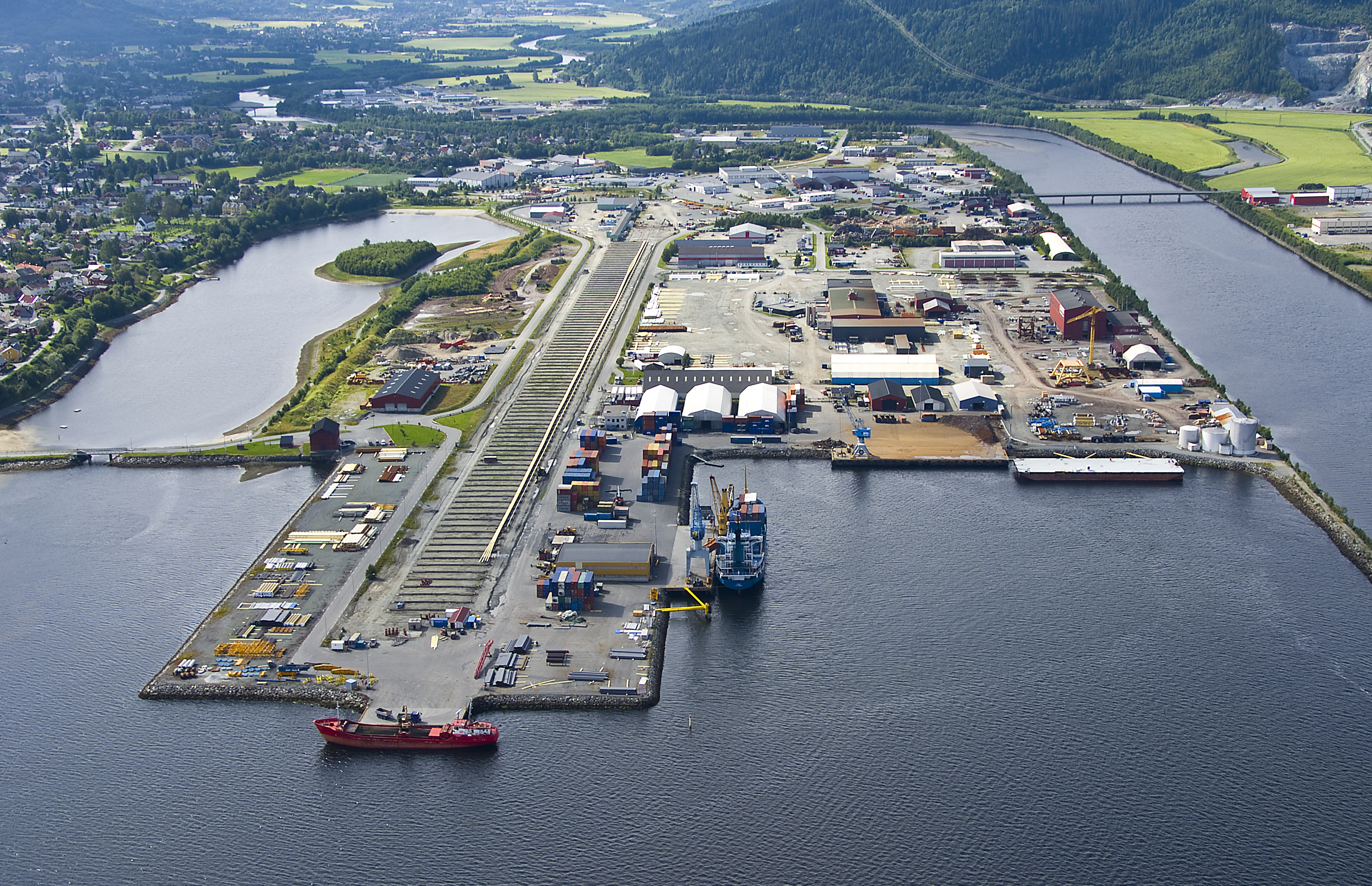
Orkanger harbour and Grønøra industrial area. By Åge Hojem, Trondheim havn.
