= Geography of Åland =

Åland Islands

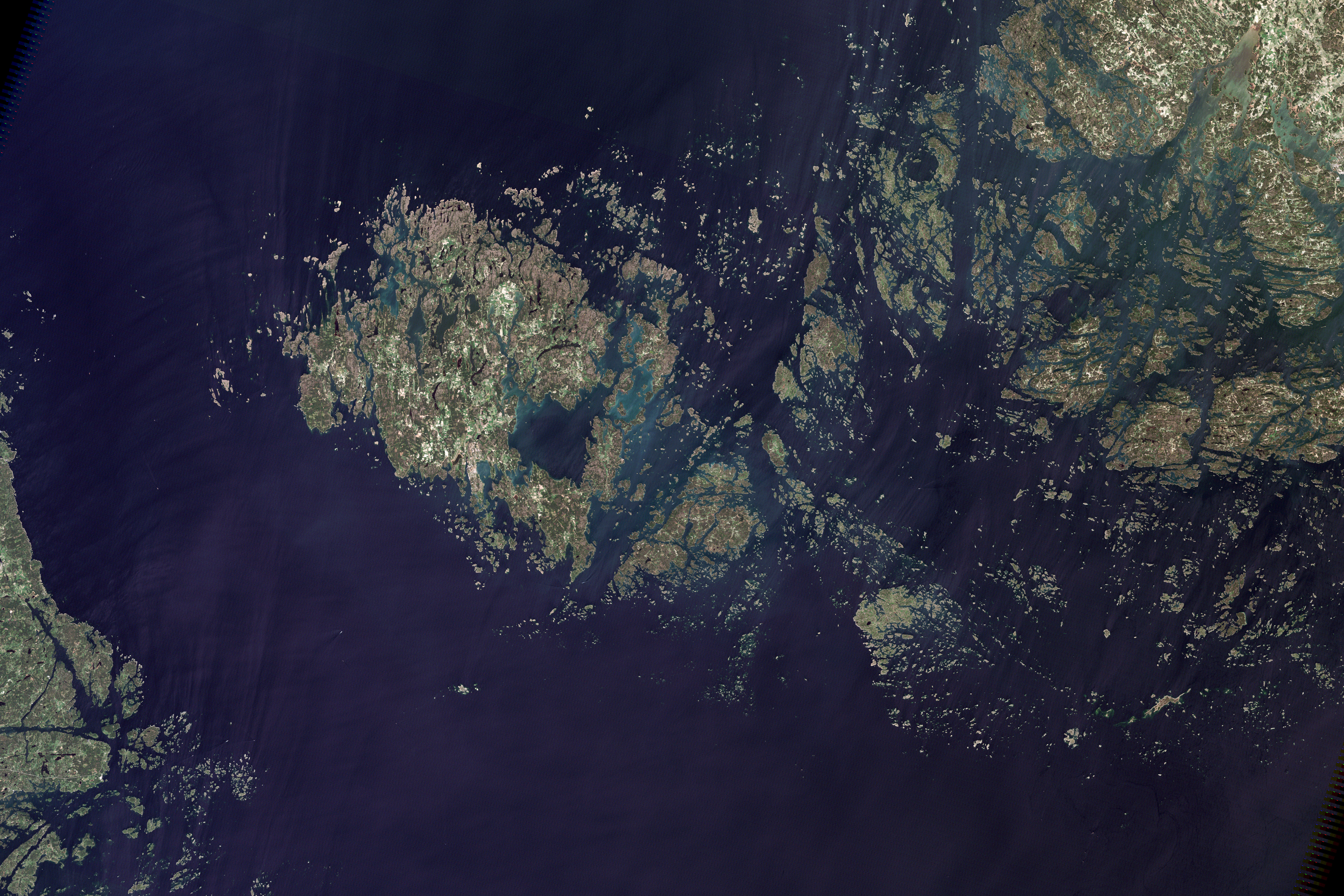
The Åland Islands.

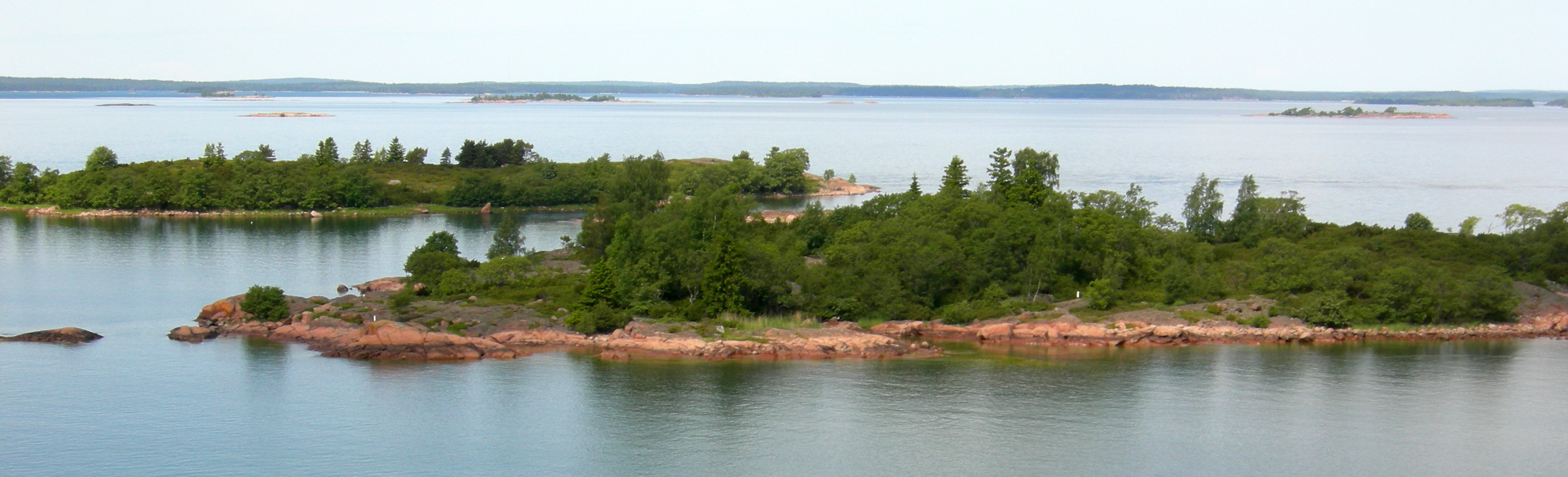
Skerries in the Åland Islands

The Åland archipelago consists of several thousands of islands, skerries and desolate rocks. About 60-80 islands are inhabited. In the east, the archipelago is connected to Archipelago Sea off the city of Turku.

The islands' landmass occupies a total land area of 1,553 square kilometres (600 mi^{2}), and a total area, including inland water and sea areas, of 13,324 square kilometres (5,144 sq mi). Its highest point is Orrdalsklint in Saltvik at 129.1 m above sea level. Åland has nearly 400 lakes of over 0.25 hectare.

The surface of the islands is generally rocky, with red and pink granite peppered with quartz crystals predominating. The soil is thin, stripped away by retreating glaciers at the end of the most recent ice age. Despite this, the presence of shell beds on many of the islands has noticeably increased the fertility of the soil.

The coast of Åland is deeply indented by bays and fjords, which form excellent sheltered harbours for vessels of draught not exceeding 19 ft. The large islands of Eckerö, Lemland, and Lumparland are separated from Åland and each other by narrow shallow straits.

Ninety per cent of the population live on Fasta Åland (the Main Island), also the site of the capital town of Mariehamn. Fasta Åland is the largest island in the archipelago, although its exact size is in some dispute owing to its irregular shape and coastline. Eckerö, Lemland and Lumparland are connected to the main island with bridges and dikes, and mostly they are regarded as parts of the main island. Estimates range from 740 square kilometres to 879 square kilometres to over 1,010 square kilometres, depending on what is included or excluded.

== Flora and fauna ==
The mildness of the climate tends to the growth of a more luxuriant vegetation than on the mainland of Finland. Pines and firs, birch, aspen, elm, ash, and lime grow, and oaks occur in small woods all over Åland. Traditionally, timber was exported for shipbuilding, and local clay was used in the tile and brickworks on Åland.

Flocks of seabirds live on the rocky islets. Traditionally, migratory birds were hunted by the inhabitants, but the native sea-birds were protected, and their eggs used as food. The islets of Lågskär and Signilskär were the traditional home to colonies of eider-duck, whose down was collected from the nests after the young had left, for export.

== See also ==
- Municipalities of Åland
