= Dag J. Opedal =

Norwegian businessman (born 1959)

Dag Jakob Opedal (born 13 April 1959) is a Norwegian businessman who was CEO of Orkla Group from 2005 to 2014.

Opedal was educated as siv.øk. from the Norwegian School of Economics in 1983, and earned an MBA from INSEAD in 1987. After two years at Dyno Industrier, he has worked for Orkla Group since 1989, first at Nora Industrier as assisting director from 1989 to 1991 and CFO from 1991 to 1994, then at Stabburet as CEO from 1994 to 1999. He became an executive in Orkla Foods and Orkla Brands in 2001, and CEO in 2005, until 2014.

Business positions
Preceded by Finn Jebsen	CEO of the Orkla Group; 2005–present	Incumbent
