= Finn Jebsen =

Norwegian businessperson (born 1950)

Finn Jebsen (born 22 April 1950) is a Norwegian businessperson. He is known as the former CEO of the Orkla Group.

He graduated as civil economist in 1974, plus took a master's degree in Business Administration at University of California (1976). Mr. Jebsen was hired in the Orkla Group in 1980. Having held various executive positions since 1984, he was the CEO from 2001 to 2005. After a scandal that forced him to leave from his position in Orkla Group, Mr. Jebsen is by 2010 chairman of the board of Kongsberg Gruppen. Norway's major defence contractor and maritime automation supplier. In addition he is chairman at Kavli Holding AS; and sole owner of Fateburet AS.

He is also deputy chair of Kommunal Landspensjonskasse.

Business positions
Preceded by Jens P. Heyerdahl	CEO of the Orkla Group; 2001–2005	Succeeded by Dag J. Opedal
