= Herbert Felix =

Swedish entrepreneur (1908–1973)

Herbert Felix (1908–1973) was a Swedish entrepreneur of Austrian-Jewish descent and the founder of the food companies AB Felix and Felix Austria.

Herbert Felix was born in an Austrian-Jewish business family in the town of Znojmo, then part of Austria-Hungary (after World War I a part of Czechoslovakia and since 1993 of the Czech Republic). He started working for the family company Löw & Felix, which was known for its type of Znaimer Gurken cucumbers, and Herbert Felix was trained to become his father's successor as the company's CEO. He was responsible for the company's export and as such got the opportunity to travel around in Europe. During a visit to Sweden, he met his first wife.

In 1938, Herbert Felix decided to leave Czechoslovakia following the annexation of Sudetenland by Nazi Germany. He came as a refugee to Sweden and in 1939 he started working for the company AB P. Håkansson in Eslöv. The activity was first run as a part of AB P. Håkansson, which through its cooperation with Felix could find an outlet for its surplus of vinegar in the factory. The success came in the early 1940s and the name "Felix" was started to be used by AB P. Håkansson as its trademark.

During World War II, Herbert Felix fought as a volunteer in the Czech exiled forces and made unsuccessful efforts to save his family from the Holocaust. He joined as an officer in the Czech forces in Britain and participated in the Allies' war in France. In the end of the war, he came with the U.S. forces to Czechoslovakia where he became ultimately aware of his family's fate. His parents and brother had already in the autumn of 1944 been deported from Theresienstadt to Auschwitz where they had been murdered. On his way back to Sweden, Herbert Felix was however able to rescue one of his best friends from a prison camp controlled by the Soviet forces.

After the war, Herbert Felix returned to Eslöv to continue to develop the company, which he purchased together with the chairman of the board in 1948. Under his leadership, the company introduced classical Swedish food products such as bostongurka, cucumber for sandwiches and ketchup in plastic bottles. The canned food department of the company was named Felix in 1955. In 1959, he started business in Austria after a request from his cousin, the Social Democratic politician (and later Chancellor of Austria) Bruno Kreisky. The new company became known as Felix Austria.

Due to economic difficulties, in 1961 Herbert Felix sold 80% of his holdings in the company to Svenska Sockerfabriks AB (SSA, Sockerbolaget) and the rest in 1964.

Herbert Felix died in Torekov, Sweden, in 1973.
