= Kruuda =

Kruuda is an Estonian surname. Notable people with the surname include:

- Karl Kruuda (born 1992), Estonian rally driver
- Oliver Kruuda (born 1967), Estonian entrepreneur and handball player
