= Polly (peanut) =

Brand of peanut-based snacks

- Product type: Snack
- Current owner: Orkla Group
- Country: Norway
- Related brands: KiMs
- Markets: Norway
- Previous owners: Sætre; 1991 – Orkla Group
- Website: http://www.kims.no/

Polly is a series of peanut-based snacks made by KiMs Norge, a subsidiary of the Orkla Group, sold through Orkla Confectionery & Snacks. In addition to the traditional peanut products, other products include cashewnuts, in addition to a number of mixed products including various nuts and raisins. Originally Polly AS was a Skien-based company that eventually was bought by Sætre. In 1991 the Sætre corporation was bought by Orkla and two years later the production was moved to the KiMs plant at Skreia.
