= Sætre =

Sætre may refer to:

== Places ==
- Sætre, Asker, a village in Asker municipality, Akershus county, Norway
- Sætre, Hedmark, a village in Elverum municipality, Hedmark county, Norway
- Sætre, Møre og Romsdal, a village in Ørsta municipality, Møre og Romsdal county, Norway

== People ==
- Johan Sætre (born 1952), Norwegian former ski jumper
- Lasse Sætre (born 1974), Norwegian former speed skater
- Magnar Sætre (1940-2002), Norwegian politician for the Labour Party

== Other ==
- Sætre (company), a Norwegian biscuit company established in 1883
