= Gunnar Nilsen =

Norwegian businessman

Gunnar Nilsen (31 March 1913 – 3 October 1984) was a Norwegian businessman, industrialist and philanthropist. He is known for founding the food processing company Stabburet (now Orkla Group) with canneries in Østfold and in Svolvær.

Nilsen was born in the parish of Glemmen in the city of Fredrikstad in Østfold, Norway. He was the son of Nils Nilsen (1871–1961) and Anna Abrahamsen (1880–1953). In 1932, he opened a tobacco shop which in 1936, he expanded into a deli. In 1943, Nilsen moved into the production of food products. During the 1950s, the business continued to increase. In 1960, Stabburet built a new factory on Råbekken outside Fredrikstad. Several canned factories in and around Fredrikstad were bought up and a fish processing factory in Svolvær began. In 1962, Stabburet A/S was formed with Gunnar Nilsen as CEO.

Nilsen also support a home for children with Down syndrome, home for young people with cerebral palsy and treatment homes for multiple sclerosis. He was decorated Knight, First Class of the Order of St. Olav in 1972. He was the subject of a biography written by Per Øyvind Heradstveit in 1978.
