= Axel Jensen Pølsefabrikk =

Former Norwegian meat and canning company

- Formerly: Axel Jensen Kjøtt
- Company type: Aksjeselskap
- Industry: Food
- Founded: 1893
- Founder: Axel Jensen
- Defunct: 1971
- Fate: Closed
- Headquarters: Oslo, Norway
- Products: Sausages, canned meat

Axel Jensen Pølsefabrikk was a meat and canning company in Oslo. The firm was founded by Axel Jensen in 1893 and grew into one of the country's largest in meat production and canning before it was closed in 1971.

Axel Jensen began with a butcher's shop in 1893, and in 1924 the business took over a former brewery at Fredensborg, where it established industrial production of canned and processed meats. The factory was the first in Norway to can ham and was for a time the country's largest producer of cured sausages, as well as a purveyor to the royal court.

After the founder's death in 1955 the business passed to his son Finn Reidar Jensen, and on his death in 1969 there was no further generation to take over. Amid consolidation in the food industry, with larger firms such as Stabburet becoming dominant, the factory was closed in 1971, and 80 employees lost their jobs.
