= Saltvik =

- Municipality
- Saltviks kommun
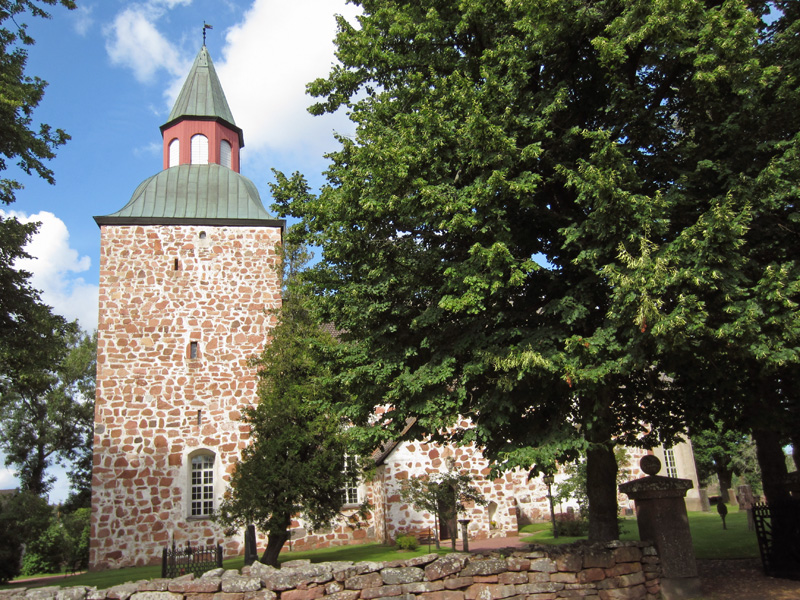
- Saltvik Church

- Coat of arms

- Location of Saltvik in Finland

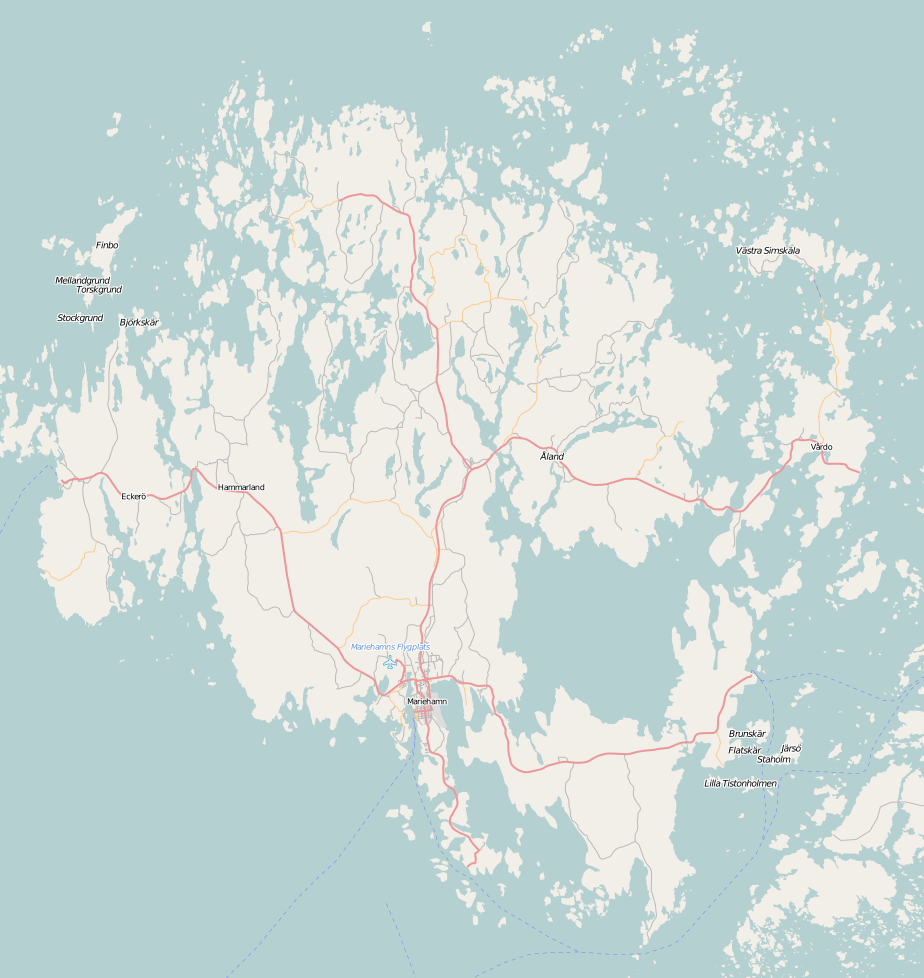
- Location in Åland
- Coordinates: 60°16.5′N 020°03.5′E
- Country: Finland
- Region: Åland
- Sub-region: Countryside

Government
  - Municipal manager: Ewa Danielsson

Area (2018-01-01)
  - Total: 1,166.54 km^{2} (450.40 sq mi)
  - Land: 152.25 km^{2} (58.78 sq mi)
  - Water: 1,014.63 km^{2} (391.75 sq mi)
  - Rank: 275th largest in Finland

Population (2025-12-31)
  - Total: 1,802
  - Rank: 266th largest in Finland
  - Density: 11.84/km^{2} (30.7/sq mi)

Population by native language
  - Swedish: 88.8% (official)
  - Finnish: 3.8%
  - Others: 7.4%

Population by age
  - 0 to 14: 16.4%
  - 15 to 64: 57.9%
  - 65 or older: 25.7%
- Time zone: UTC+02:00 (EET)
  - Summer (DST): UTC+03:00 (EEST)
- Website: www.saltvik.ax

Saltvik is a municipality of Åland, an autonomous territory of Finland. The total area is 1 161,8 km^{2}, of which 150,7 km^{2} is land, 4,7 km^{2} lakes and 1006,4 km^{2} sea.

The archipelago north of Saltvik is made up of several islands: closest to land are the big islands Boxö, Sommarö, Flatö and Ryssö. Beyond, the horizon opens up and after passing Saggö it is more or less unbroken.

== History ==
The municipality has a rich history. When Åland emerged from the sea about 8,000 BC, Saltvik was the first land to be seen. During the Viking ages, Kvarnbo used to be a central crown court- and place of merchandise. Today, people can visit the medieval church and at the court place see the memorial monument.

The church St:a Maria is located by Kvarnboviken in the east of Saltvik. The red granite church is one of the oldest in Åland, and was once the main church in the province. The church has been rebuilt and extended several times. The oldest parts are from the late 13th century, but various reconstructions have been made from the 14th century until today. For example, the chalk drawings on the walls have first been painted, then covered and then uncovered again. Around and under the church, there are traces of houses from Viking Age. This is not so strange, considering the church is located in the middle of the biggest grave field from Iron Age in Åland.

Håkan Skogsjö has documented the permanently residing population of Saltvik from the 17th century to the present, covering the history of the municipality as a whole, its individual hamlets, down to each original farmstead and the families who lived there.

A former Finnish government lands official claims a 17,800-square-meter (0.004 acre) plot on the island of Saltvik "had been handed over to Russia's Foreign Ministry in 2009, in accordance with a 1947 post-war peace treaty that saw German holdings in Finland transferred to the Soviet Union".

== Business ==
About 50% of the people living in Saltvik work in the service industry or in the public sector. 15% work in transport and 14% in industry. Construction and farming/fishing employ, respectively, 10% and 7%.

The head office and one factory of the Chips Group is located in the municipality. The company begun its operations in Saltvik in 1969 and was the first potato chip producer in Finland. Through acquisitions, new establishments and growth, the group has grown and is today the market leader within snacks in the Nordic and Baltic countries. The best-known brands are Taffel, OLW, KiMs and Oolannin. In 2005, the Norwegian industrial group Orkla ASA acquired all the shares in the Chips Group.

== Points of interest ==
- Orrdalsklint, the highest point on Åland Islands
- Saltvik Church, Medieval church built in the 1370s

== Notable people ==
- Pehr Henrik Nordgren, composer
- Atos Wirtanen, journalist and member of parliament
