= Beauvais (brand) =

Danish food brand

- Type: Subsidiary of Orkla ASA
- Industry: Food
- Founded: 1850; 176 years ago in Copenhagen, Denmark
- Founder: Jeean Baptiste Desiré Beauvais
- Products: Ketchup, salad dressings
- Website: beauvais.dk

Beauvais is a Danish brand of condiments, snacks and readymade meals now owned by Norwegian food company Orkla ASA. The brand was founded by and is named for Jean Baptiste Desiré Beauvais, a French immigrant, who established a production of canned food in Copenhagen in 1850. The company was acquired by Orkla in 1995 and renamed Orkla Foods Denmark in 2013.

== History ==
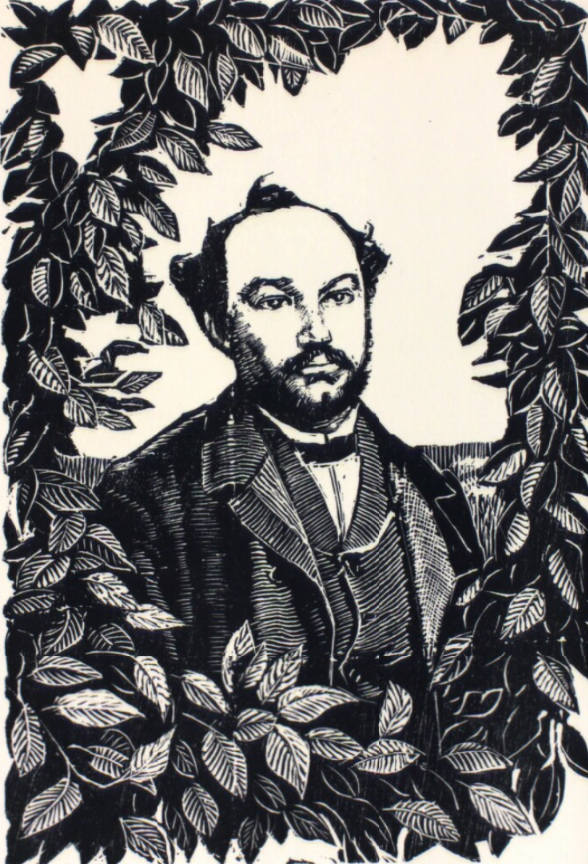
H. D. Beauvais

Beauvais was founded by and is named for Jean Baptiste Desiré Beauvais. He was born in Paris but came to Denmark with his family in 1846. The family was on the way to Russia but ended up settling in Copenhagen where his father opened a charcuterie store on Østergade. Jean Desiré Beauvais established a production of canned food on his father's estate in Vangede in 1850. The products were mainly sold to the Royal Danish Navy. The company relocated to Store Kongensgade in 1865 and was also engaged in the import and export of canned food. Beauvais passed the management of the company over to his two sons in 1885 and it was converted into a limited company (aktieselskab) after his death.

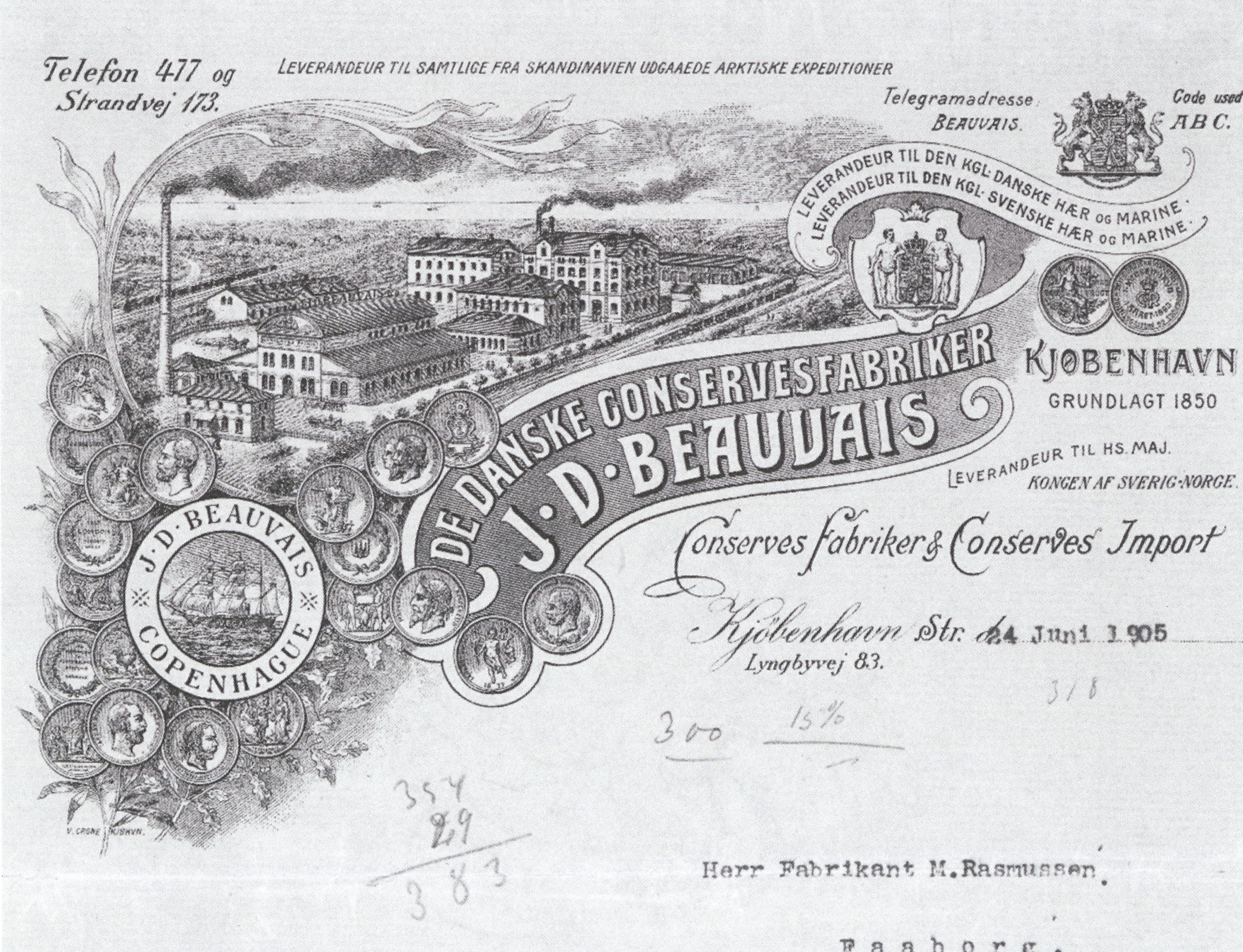
An advertisement from the 1890s featuring the new Lyngbyvej factory

A large new factory was inaugurated at Lyngbyvej in 1895. The buildings were designed by the architect Thorvald Sørensen. The name of the company was changed to De danske Konservesfabrikker, J. D. Beauvais in 1898.

The company ran into economic difficulties in 1905 and was at the initiative of Privatbanken merged with Fåborg-based De Dansk Vin og Konserves Fabriker, M. Rasmussen (1856–1916) under the name Akts. De Danske Vin og Konserves Fabriker J. D. Beauvais-M. Rasmussen in 1906. Mads Rasmussen headed the company until shortly before his death in 1916.

The company opened a new factory in Svinninge in 1957 to be closer to the vegetable producers from Lammefjorden. The factory in Copenhagen closed in 1970 and the buildings were demolished to make way for an expansion of Lyngbyvej.

The company was in 2013 renamed Beauvais foods after acquiring a number of other Danish food companies and brands, including Beauvais, Den Gamle Fabrik, Glyngøre, Pastella and Risifrutti.

Beauvais foods was acquired by Orkla ASA in 1995. It merged with Rieber & Søn Danmark in 2013 and the company was renamed Orkla Foods Denmark per 1 December 2013.

== Product range ==
Products sold under the Beauvais brand include tomato ketchup, salad dressing and other condiments, snacks and readymade meals.
