= Lilleborg (company) =

Company

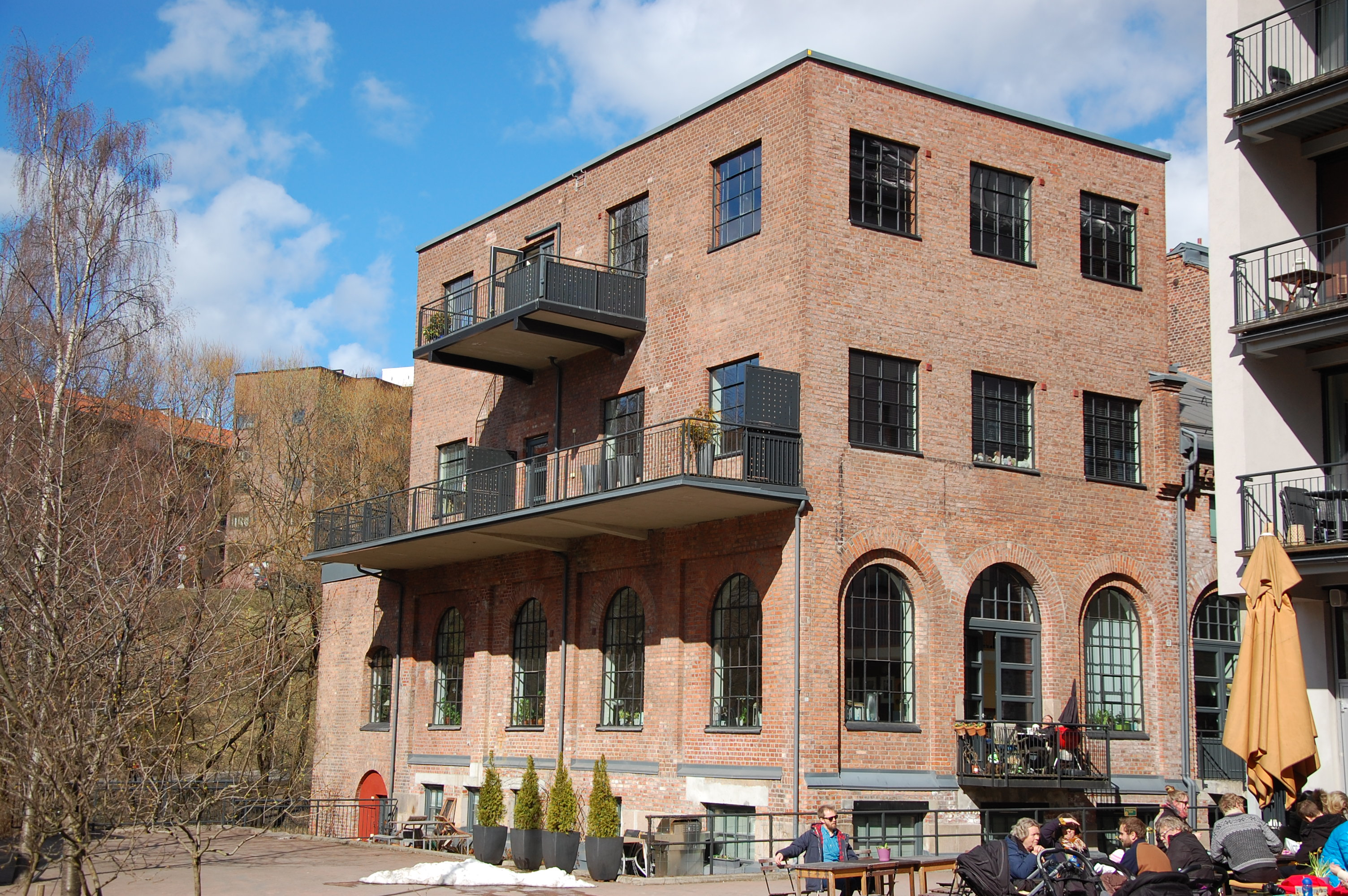

Lilleborg AS is a major hygiene and cleaning article company in Norway, owned by Solenis, and formerly owned by the Orkla Group. It was established in 1833, and was one of the first companies in Norway to start manufacturing brand name products. It currently operates three factories in Norway, and employs a total working staff of 595.

== History ==
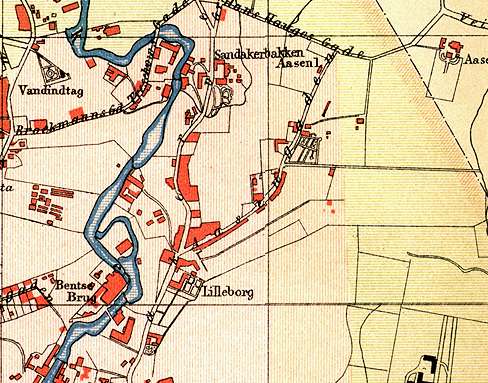
1887 map showing Lilleborg and Bentse Brug.

Originally a family business, established in 1833 on the banks of the Aker river in Oslo, Lilleborg expanded in 1842 to manufacturing hygiene products with the opening of "sæbesyderiet", the "soap boilery". Here the company's manufacture of soft soap and bathroom soaps took place. In 1897, it became an aksjeselskap, and changed its name to A/S Lilleborg Fabrikker. In the final years of the 19th century, the company was offering a broad range of oils, bathroom, household and soft soaps. It was also the largest company of its sort in Norway, with more than 100 employees on roll.

At the end of the 1920s, Lilleborg had developed a close relationship with Denofa, a cooking oil producing company based in Fredrikstad. This culminated in 1930 with an agreement of cooperation between Lilleborg, Denofa, and the British company Lever Brothers (later Unilever), which had large ownership interests in the companies. As part of this agreement, Lilleborg acquired ownership and production of several well-known Lever Brothers brands, Sunlight being perhaps the foremost. Focusing strongly on brands throughout the 1930s, the company launched several of their strongest-selling brands of today in the years before the war, including Lano, Solidox, Blenda and Lux.

Unilever decided to sell their stocks in the company in 1958, but agreed upon another cooperation agreement which was to last for 20 years. This agreement was subsequently reformed on two occasions, and is still in effect - and will be until 2014. The following year, Denofa and Lilleborg merged to form A/S Denofa og Lilleborg Fabriker, which soon became a major player in the Norwegian hygiene market. The company then, in 1973, acquired Goma fabrikker, which in turned owned (amongst others) A/S Ello in Kristiansund.

In 1996, Lilleborg and Denofa split once more into two separate entities, in which Denofa continued the cooking oil activities, while Lilleborg was evolved into a pure brand-name manufacturer. In relation with this split, Lilleborg was reorganized as a company under Orkla Brands, a division of the Orkla Group, whilst Denofa was placed under Orkla Chemistry. In 1997, the activity by the Aker river ceased, while a new laundry detergent factory was opened in Ski.

== Brands ==
Lilleborg holds and/or produces the following brand name products:

=== Personal hygiene ===
- Lano
- Lux (hand soap)
- Dr Greve (shower gels, deodorant, hand soap)
- Dove
- Axe
- Sterilan (deodorant)
- Define (hair care)
- Finesse (hair care)
- Sunsilk (hair care)
- Vaseline Intensive Care (skin care)
- LdB / Lait de Beauté (skin care)
- Solidox (toothpaste, gum)
- Spenol

=== Laundry ===
- Blenda
- Omo
- Milo (detergent and fabric softener)
- Comfort (fabric softener)

=== Household ===
- Zalo (manual dishwashing)
- Sun (dishwashing)
- Svint (soap-added steel wool)
- Jif
- Salmi (ammonia-based cleaning fluid)
- Klorin (chlorine bleach/disinfectant)
- Krystal (soft soap)

=== Other ===
- Lypsyl (lip balm)

== See also ==
- List of oldest companies
