= Healthspan (company) =

Guernsey-based British health mail-order supplier

Healthspan Limited
- Predecessor: Healthspan Direct
- Founded: 1996
- Founder: Derek Coates
- Headquarters: Guernsey, The Channel Islands
- Products: Vitamins, Minerals and Health supplements
- Subsidiaries: Vista Hotels Group
- Website: http://www.healthspan.co.uk/

Healthspan is a British mail-order supplier of vitamins, minerals and health supplements. Established by Derek Coates in 1996, the company is based at the Healthspan House on the Channel Island of Guernsey.

== History ==
Healthspan Direct was founded by Derek Coates in 1996, with an initial catalogue of 10 products, eventually expanding to more than 150 products including nutritional supplements, herbal range products, skincare and cosmetic products (under the Nurture name) and veterinary supplements (as VetVits). In 2001, the company was renamed Healthspan.

In March 2022, the Norwegian company Orkla Health acquired 100% of Healthspan's shares for £65 million on a cash and debt-free basis.

== Lawsuit and Acquisition of Healthy Direct ==
In 2004, the Healthspan filed a lawsuit against Healthy Direct, another health supplement supplier based in Guernsey, claiming that the company had changed its name from C.I. Nutriceuticals Ltd. in order to profit from Healthspan's brand value. The application was dismissed. In 2008, Healthspan purchased Healthy Direct in what was reported to be "an eight-figure deal", making Healthspan the UK's biggest direct supplier of nutrition supplements.

== Potential Sale and the LVCR ==
In January 2011, it was reported Coates was exploring the possibility of selling Healthspan for a price of around £150 million, with between 10 and 12 potential buyers submitting bids. Coates cited personal reasons related to a desire to reduce his workload, but stated that the existing management and workforce would not be affected. When four jobs were eliminated a week later, Healthspan denied that they were related to an impending sale, and were instead a result of the completed integration of Healthspan and Healthy Direct products. In 2011, the UK also announced it was ending the Low Value Consignment Relief (LVCR) loophole, which allowed retailers to avoid paying tax on goods exported from the Channel Islands to the UK that were under the value of £18. Healthspan challenged the decision, citing that countries located outside the EU, including Switzerland, Cyprus, Hong Kong, the USA and China, were not affected by the ruling. The company also announced that, following its legal challenge, it would begin exploring relocating its distribution operations, although its headquarters would remain in Guernsey.

In May 2011, it was announced that the company was no longer for sale, with the elimination of the LVCR being one of the main reasons, contributing to "too many uncertainties to maximise the value of a sale." Plans to sell the company were reported to have been put on hold for "at least two or three years." Coates also announced that he was stepping down as CEO of Healthspan in order to focus on other business interests and his personal life, although he would remain with Healthspan as the company's Group Chairman. He was replaced by former Deputy Chief Executive Graham Case, who was in turn replaced in early 2016 by Tim Pethick who left in 2018. The current CEO is Martin Talbot.

== Healthspan Leisure ==
In 2004, Healthspan began to invest in the tourism industry in the Channel Islands, with the purchase and refurbishment of three hotels - the Braye Beach Hotel on Alderney, and the Fermain Hotel and the 37-room La Favorita in Guernsey - under the name of Healthspan Leisure. The company made it possible for tourists to book the hotels directly through their existing call centers. The same year, it also acquired Rockhopper Airlines, which flies from and within the Channel Islands to the United Kingdom and Europe, changing the airline's name to Blue Islands. While Healthspan was exploring the possibility of a sale in 2011, Healthspan Leisure was renamed as the Vista Hotels Group.

== Disputes ==
In 2008, Healthspan was criticized by Sky News who asked a panel of experts to take the Nutriprofile, the company's dietary questionnaire, entering in a healthy diet. The experts felt that the company was suggesting more supplements than were actually needed. Healthspan responded that the "Recommendations on diet and lifestyle in the Nutriprofile are scientifically validated."

Healthspan has also been criticized by the Advertising Standards Authority (ASA), who have made rulings against the company on several occasions for claims made about the company's products.

- In 2008, a ruling was made against the company over statements made in a catalog mailing for health food supplements describing the properties of products including selenium, lutein, green tea and turmeric. The ASA ruled that the information made unsubstantiated medical claims that could discourage consumers from seeking treatment for medical conditions and that the ad must not appear again.
- In 2008, a ruling was made against the company over an email advertising an omega-3 product for children called Brain Boosters. The ASA determined that the name implied that the product could dramatically enhance children's brain function, which wasn't medically substantiated, and that the ad must not appear again.
- In 2009, a ruling was made against the company over an e-mail stating that "more people buy their vitamins and supplements from Healthspan than any other supplier in the UK." The ASA determined that the calculations were based on estimates and averages for their competitors compared with their own sales figures, and that the claim was misleading, ruling that the ad must not appear again.
- In 2010, a ruling was made against the company over a pair of brochures that made a series of claims about the properties of nutritional supplements including bilberry, devil's claw, black cohosh, ginseng, echinacea, ginkgo biloba, milk thistle, St. John's wort and valerian. The ASA found that the claims suggested properties of the products that were not medically substantiated, and that the ads must not appear again.
- In 2011, a ruling was made against the company over an advertisement feature in the form of a magazine article entitled "Top 10 supplements for healthy ageing - Different supplements suit different people at different stages of their lives." The article described the properties of various supplements, including lycopene, glucosamine and ginkgo biloba. Another advertisement feature in the same magazine was headed "7 ages of man", and included properties of other supplements, including saw palmetto. The ASA found that the claims suggested properties of the products that were not medically substantiated, and that the ads must not appear again.
- In 2011, a complaint was made against the company regarding a mail order catalog advertising supplements, including the Healthspan products Optiflex Glucosamine, Joint Synergex, Heart Synergex and Brain Synergex. In this case, the rulings were not upheld, as it was determined that Helathspan had displayed prominent disclaimers within the brochure, stating that their products were not intended as treatments, encouraging consumers to seek medical advice where necessary.
