= Kalev (confectioner) =

Company based in Estonia

Coordinates: 59°21′38.02″N 24°53′17.66″E

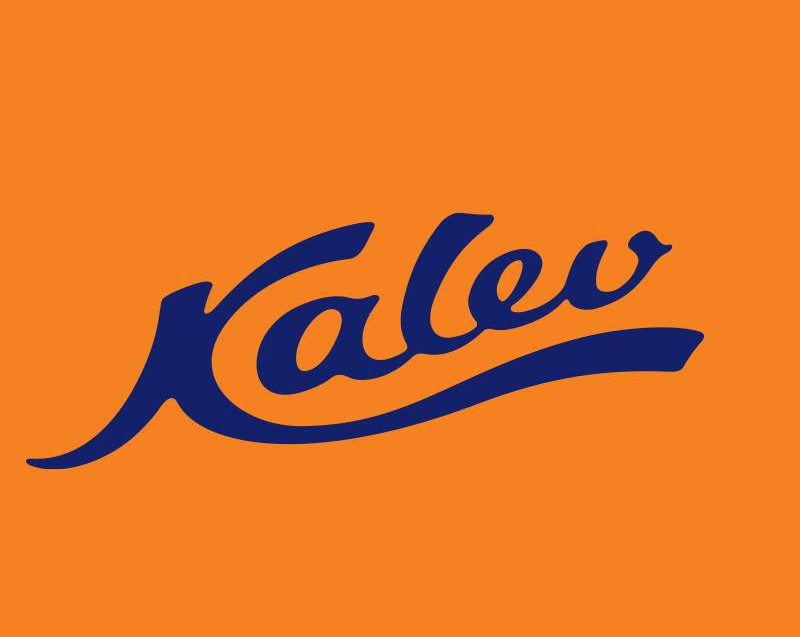
- Type: Subsidiary of Orkla Group
- Founded: 1806
- Founder: Lorenz Caviezel
- Headquarters: Lehmja, Rae Parish, Estonia
- Area served: Estonia
- Website: www.kalev.eu

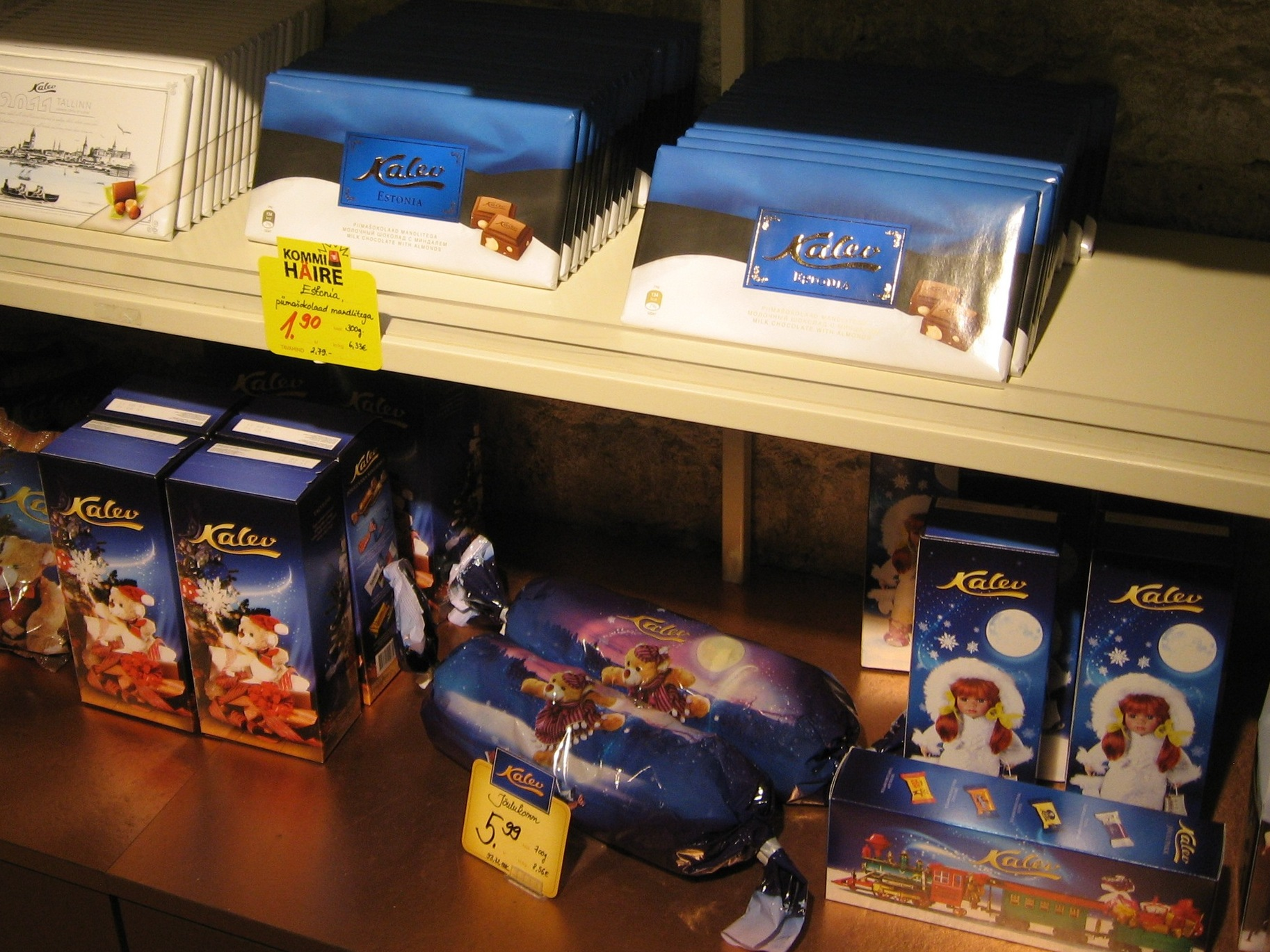
A selection of Kalev chocolates

AS Kalev (2006– Kalev Chocolate Factory AS) is an Estonian confectionery company. The company traces its origins back two hundred years, the business that preceded the Maiasmokk café was founded in 1806, and is now owned by Kalev. The Kalev company is the country's largest producer of sweets and a part of the industrial conglomerate Orkla Group. Kalev is based in Põrguvälja near Jüri, Rae Parish, Harju County.

== History ==
=== Roots and foundational developments (19th century) ===
The birth of the Estonian confectionery industry dates back to 1806, when pastry cook Lorenz Caviezel (:de) opened a confectionery business in Tallinn at Pikk Street, where Café Maiasmokk (Sweet Tooth) has been located since 1864.

In 1864, the business, which had changed hands many times, came into the possession of Georg Johann Stude. After ten years of operation, Stude decided to expand the business: he bought a neighbouring house and in place of these two houses constructed a new and more solid building, which is still there. Out of Stude's production, marzipan figures and hand-made chocolate candies were in especially high demand. Stude's sweets sequentially became known outside Estonia. Thus, for example, the court of the Russian tsar was a regular customer at the turn of the 20th century.

Recipes and working methods originating from Stude's confectionery are still held in great esteem in today's Kalev – to this day the marzipan figures are hand-made candies.

=== Predecessors and birth of an industry (Early 20th century) ===
At the beginning of the 20th century, there were other pioneers of the confectionery industry in Tallinn that could be considered the predecessors of Kalev. Perhaps one of the most renowned was Kawe confectionery, founded in 1921 by brothers Karl and Kolla Wellner at Müürivahe Street, 62. Kawe's products, the then greatest confectionery in Estonia, were well known in Estonia and abroad, and the company exported a significant share of its output to destinations such as the United States, England, Tunisia, Morocco, France, India and China.

Of other big sweet producers of the time, the factories of Ginovker, Brandmann and Klausson should also be mentioned. At the end of the 1930s, Kawe and these three confectioneries employed 75% of all Estonian confectionery workers. Competing with big factories were a number of smaller enterprises: Riola, Endla, Eelis, Efekt and others.

=== Mergers and Kave branding (Soviet era) ===
The change in policy in 1940 brought along big changes for the confectionery industry. This was the time of nationalisation and company mergers. In 1940, the Riola factory was joined with the Brandmann business and the enterprise was renamed the Karamell Sweet Factory. Later on, Karamell was joined by the marzipan and chocolate candy unit of Georg Stude's business. Cakes and tarts continued to be made at the Pikk Street building, still known as the Café Maiasmokk.

Soon after that, Kawe merged with the sweet factories of Efekt, Eelis, Endla, Soliid and the Ermos syrup factory situated in Kloodi manor house near Rakvere. The merged enterprise continued to operate under the name Kawe until 1948. On 1 April 1948, the company was renamed Kalev Confectionery Factory. The name was changed for ideological reasons: someone had complained to a minister that the name “Kawe” had once been formed of the former owners’ initials. This, however, was perceived as inappropriate for a Soviet enterprise. Hence, a name competition was quickly held. There were two name propositions: “Punane Kompu” (Red Candy) and “Kalev”. A majority of only one vote determined that the new name would be “Kalev”.

In 1957, a new confectionery operation named Uus Kalev (New Kalev) was opened at Pärnu Road 139, which merged with Karamell a year later. In 1962, New Kalev and Kalev merged into what is now operating as the Kalev confectionery factory.

Throughout the Soviet period, Kalev produced sweets at full capacity for Estonia, as well as almost the whole of the former Soviet Union. Kalev's sweets also found recognition outside the borders of the Soviet Union, bringing home prizes from several international fairs and exhibitions. Kalev is also known to have produced the first Soviet chewing gum in 1968. Although, it was directly banned for propagandizing the capitalist way of life. Eventually the production was restarted in 1979 and even though other factories opened in other parts of Soviet Union Kalev captured more than half of the Soviet market.

=== State enterprise and privatization (Post-Soviet era and recent developments) ===
In 1991, the state enterprise of Kalev was founded on the basis of the Kalev confectionery factory. In 1995, the privatisation of the state enterprise became possible and a public limited company was founded.

From 1996 to 2009, the shares of the public limited company AS Kalev were listed on the Tallinn Stock Exchange. The owner of the majority of shares, Oliver Kruuda took the company private. The year 2003 was historically important to Kalev: the company moved from Tallinn to a new factory complex in Harjumaa, Rae rural municipality. In May 2010, the core business – as a separate company called Kalev Chocolate Factory – was sold to the Nordic food industry group Felix Abba, which is a subsidiary of the conglomerate Orkla Group.

In the year 2018, AS Kalev merged with AS Põltsamaa Felix.Previously, AS Kalev was one of the few Estonian food industry enterprises based mainly on Estonian capital.

== Corporate affairs ==
The address in Tallinn's Old Town is: Maiasmoka maja, Pikk tn 16, Tallinn. The group earns stable profits and now employs about 800 people.

=== Stores ===
- Kalev Šokolaadipood ja Meistrikoda Rotermannis (Roseni 7, Tallinn)
- Kalev Balti Jaama Šokolaadipood (Kopli 1, Tallinn)
- Kalev Nõmme Šokolaadipood (Turu 8/Piiri 6, Tallinn)
- Kalev Jüri Tehasepood (Põrguvälja tee 6, Lehmja)
- Kalev Tartu Šokolaadipood (Poe 1/Küüni 4, Tartu)
- Kalev Kuressaare Šokolaadipood (Lossi 1, Kuressaare)
- Kalev Pärnu Šokolaadipood (Port Artur 2, Lai 11, Pärnu)
- Felixi pood (Tallinna mnt. 1, Põltsamaa)

== Products ==
As well as manufacturing confectionery, and retailing through cafés and candy shops, the Kalev group now has interests in flour and bakery products, milk products and real estate development and management. Currently, in addition to selling pre-made marzipan, customized painted marzipan can be ordered in the Kalev Marzipan Room (martsipanituba) in Tallinn on Sundays. In recent years, AS Kalev has expanded its range of products.

== See also ==
- List of bean-to-bar chocolate manufacturers
