= Bostongurka =

Type of relish with pickled gherkins, red bell pepper and onion with spices

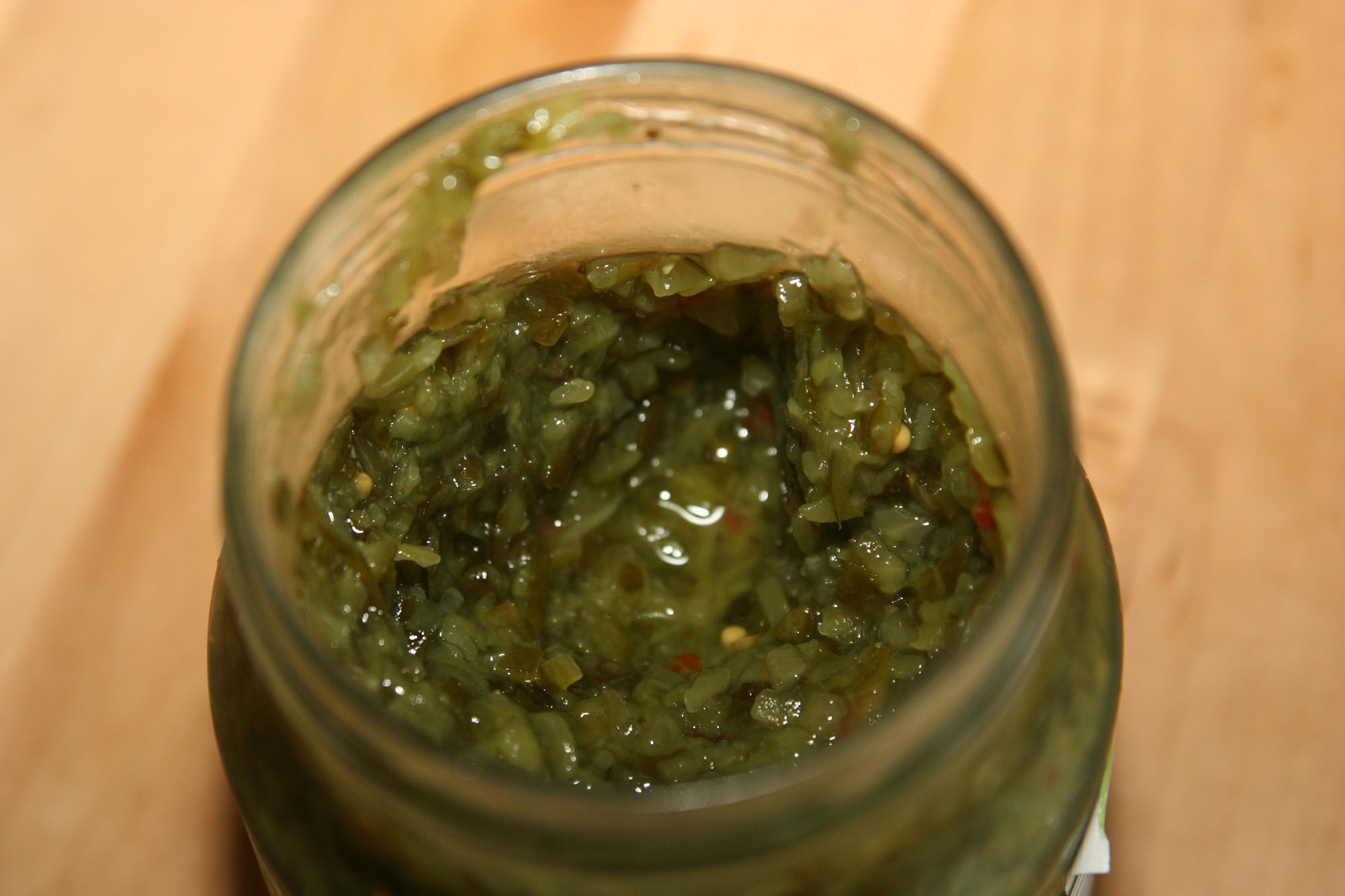
Jar with Bostongurka.

Bostongurka (Swedish meaning "Boston cucumber") is a type of relish with pickled gherkins, red bell pepper and onion with spices such as mustard seeds. It is so popular in Sweden that it is considered by some to be a generic term.

Despite its name, Bostongurka has nothing to do with the city of Boston. Bostongurka was invented by the Swedish company Felix based on a recipe from Hungary. It was originally invented as a way to use up the end pieces left over when making pickled gherkins. Today, the name Bostongurka is a registered trademark of Orkla Group.
