= Lano (soap) =

Norwegian soap brand

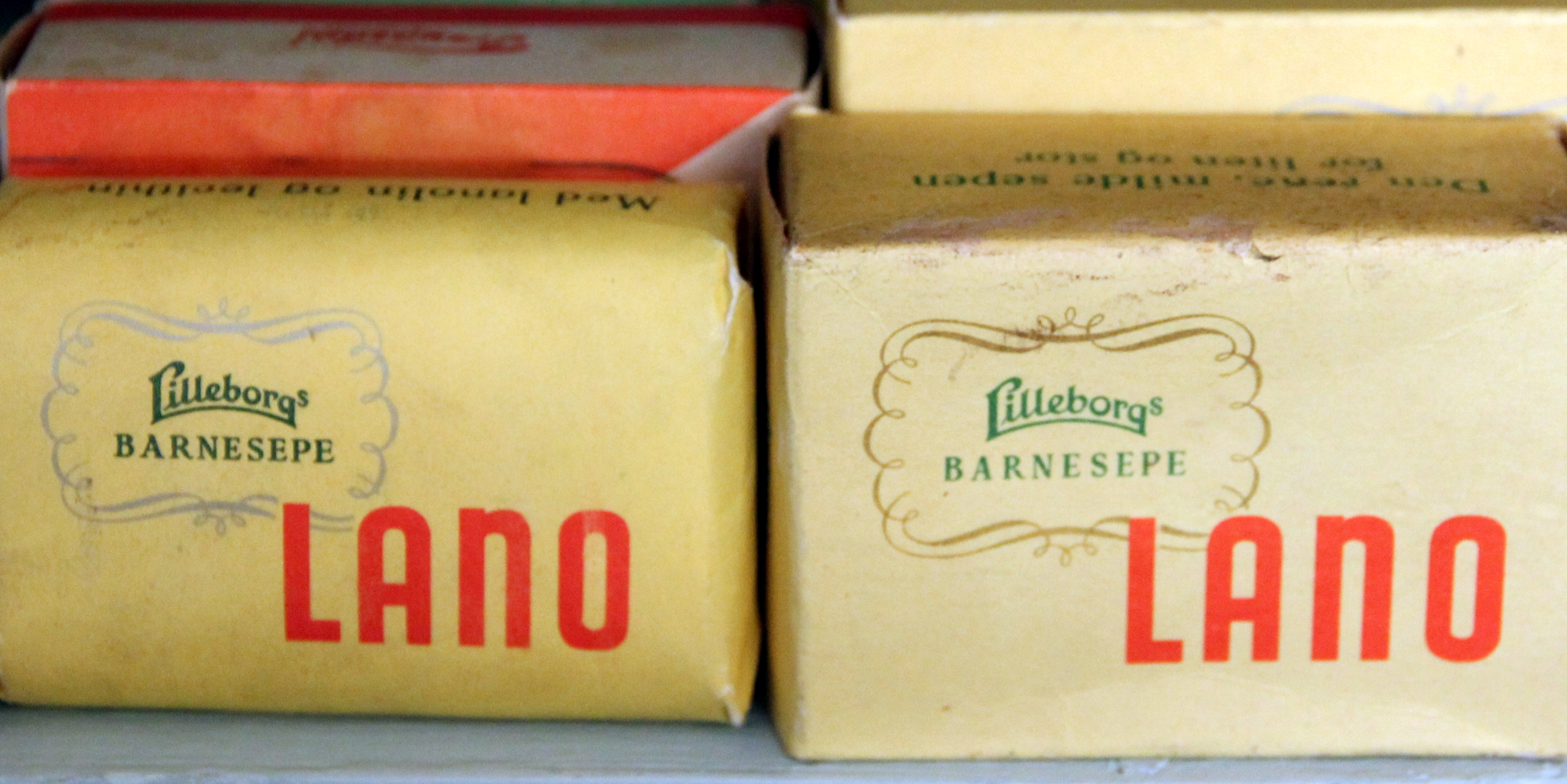
Lano soap in its packaging from around the 1960s.

Lano is a leading brand of soap in Norway. It comes in varieties of shower gels and liquid hand wash as well as the original soap bar. Lano is produced by Lilleborg Commodities, a hygiene product manufacturer owned in turn by the Orkla Group (Mondelez International).

== History ==
The Lano soap bar was introduced in 1934, and is today the dominant soap bar in the Norwegian market. In 1959, Lano introduced Lano-ungen, or 'the Lano kid', a competition where one entered a picture of a child which could then be picked out to represent the soap for the coming year, as well as receive various prizes. Lano liquid hand soap was launched in 1989, with a compact soap dispenser being introduced in 1993. Around the turn of the millennium, Lano introduced a liquid shower gel, packed in a special container with a plastic hook for easy hanging inside a shower enclosure.

== Characteristics ==
Lano is a mild, low-perfume soap, which has led to it being very popular as an all-round family cleaning product. This is reflected in its motto, Lano for liten og Lano for stor, which translates roughly into 'Lano for big and small'.

== Environment ==
The liquid varieties of the soap are available in refill bags, and all packaging supposedly contains as high a percentage of recycled materials as possible. According to Lilleborg, no materials that are harmful to the environment upon burning or disposal are used in the product packaging, and PVC is not used.
