= AB Felix =

Swedish food company

- Industry: Food
- Founder: Herbert Felix
- Headquarters: Sweden
- Website: felix.se

AB Felix was a Swedish food company with seat in Eslöv. The Felix brand has been part of Orkla since 1995. Its main products were produced from potatoes and pickles.

The company was founded by Herbert Felix (1908-1973) who arrived in Sweden 1938 as a refugee from Nazism. He was hired by AB P. Håkansson who had a surplus of acetic acid needed expertise in pickles. Herbert Felix had the necessary experience since he had worked with the family company Löw & Felix (founded in 1868) in modern-day Znojmo. They were known for their Znaimer Gurken and in the new company cucumber pickles (including the famous Boston Cucumber) were the major products, even after the company expanded its production to include potato-based foodstuffs. Following the Second World War, an important client of the company became the United States forces which were still stationed in Europe. In 1959, AB Felix started an Austrian subsidiary company, Felix Austria.

Cavenham Foods purchased 75% of the shares in the company in November 1972 from its owner AB Cardo for $13.5 million, and by December 1976 had purchased the remaining shareholdings it did not own. In April 1980, as part of Cavenham's divestment in food production, AB Felix was sold to Swedish firm Beijerinvest.
