= Grandiosa =

Norwegian brand of frozen pizza

Coordinates: 62.31278°N 6.94559°E

- The official logo of Grandiosa Pizza
- Product type: Frozen pizza
- Current owner: Orkla Group
- Introduced: 11 February 1980
- Markets: Nordic countries (especially Norway); Poland
- Website: Grandiosa.no

Pizza Grandiosa (colloquially also referred to simply as Grandiosa or Grandis) is the most popular brand of frozen pizza in Norway.

== History ==
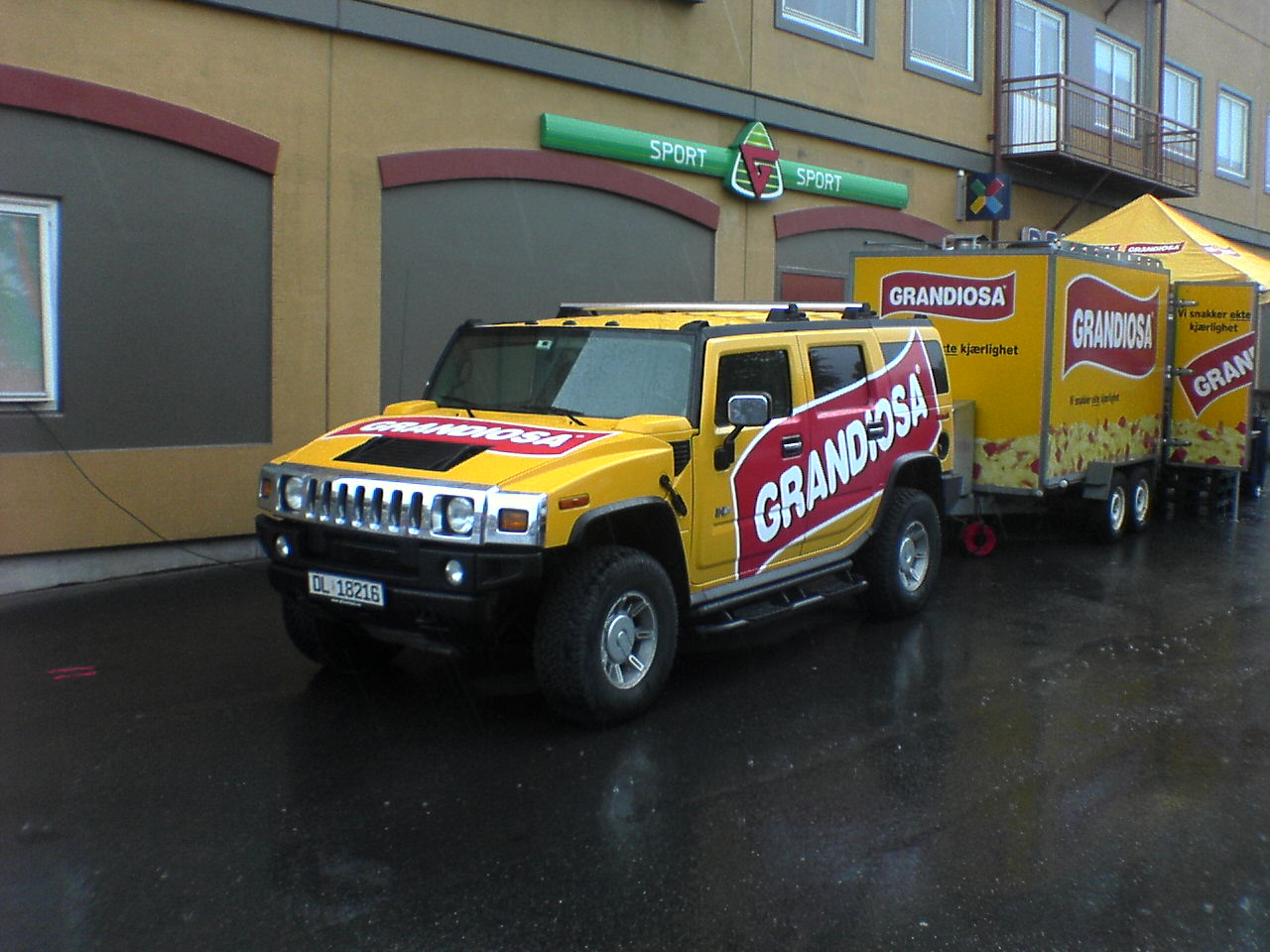
A Hummer with Grandiosa pizza advertising

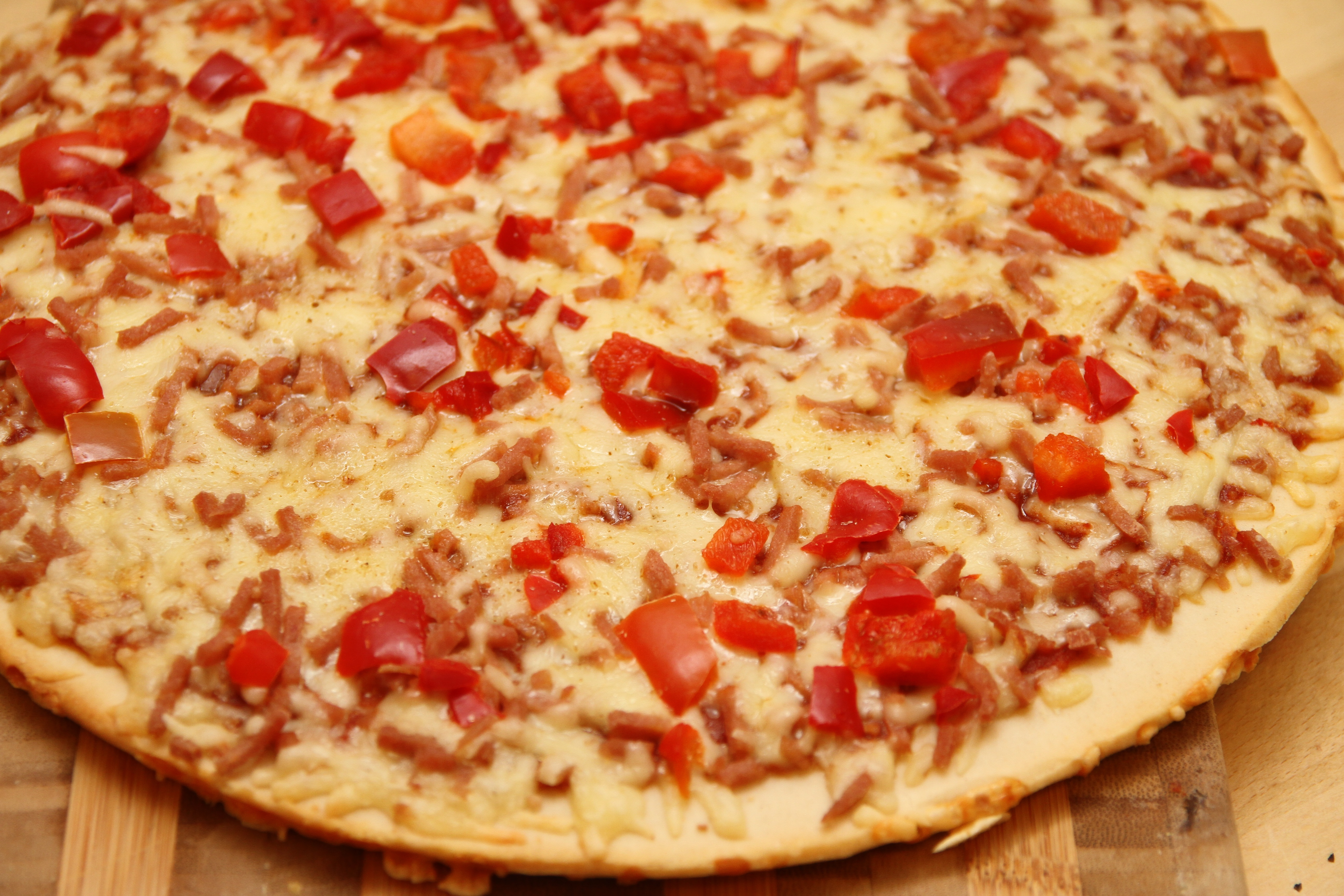
An example of baked Grandiosa pizza

Production of the original Grandiosa started on 11 February 1980, then produced by Nora (now Stabburet) in Stranda Municipality in Sunnmøre. Grandiosa was one of the first frozen pizzas produced in Norway. The pizza became vastly popular and is still the most sold pizza brand in Norway, in defiance of increasing competition from other local and international brands. In 2002 Stabburet responded to increased competition in the frozen food segment by reviving the brand with creative marketing and several new versions of Grandiosa. The pizza is also exported to the neighbouring countries Sweden, Finland, Denmark, Poland, Iceland, and Faroe Islands, with the topping selection in Sweden and Finland differing substantially from the ones in Norway.

The pizza is subject to a lot of humorous debate, and is unquestionably a piece of modern culture, loathed and loved by Norwegians. It has been called the "modern national dish" by some, others claim it is "a piece of cardboard", "laziness in a box" and even "refrigerated evil".

In 2005 Grandiosa got its own unofficial book, Grandiosaland. The book contains stories about a man who had a broken jaw and had to put his Grandiosa in a blender to eat it, and many other stories about Grandiosa, and favourite Norwegian pastimes such as hyttetur (trips to cabins typically located close to the sea/fjords or up in the mountains), russetid (the close to lawless celebration of the high school graduation) and dugnad (the collective activity of helping one another with mutual tasks through unpaid and voluntary work of importance to the community).

== Market ==
Stabburet has used creative marketing to promote Grandiosa. Examples are their very successful SMS-vote marketing campaign for selecting new addition to the pizza in 2004.

Another example is their hit mobile ring tone "Respekt for Grandiosa" (Respect for Grandiosa) which was downloaded 300,000 times within 1.5 months. The song went No. 1 in Norway, topping the charts for 8 weeks, beginning in March 2006.

A total of 260 million pizzas have been sold. Twenty-four million units of Grandiosa are produced each year for the 5.4 million citizens of Norway.

== Varieties ==
In addition to the original Grandiosa, there exist different varieties.

Introduced	Name	Type	Notes
11 November 1980	Grandiosa	"Pizzameat" (40% beef), cheese, tomato sauce and red bell pepper	The original Grandiosa
2002	Grandiosa Mild Taco	Taco spiced meat and corn	Discontinued in favour of Kjøttdeig & Løk
2004	Grandiosa Pepperoni	Pepperoni and oregano	Lost to Kjøttdeig & Løk but is still sold regardless
2004	Grandiosa Kjøttdeig & Løk	Minced meat and onion	Winner of the 2004 pizza election
2005	Grandiosa Taco	Taco spiced meat	Winner of the 2005 pizza election
2005	Grandiosa Pølse & Tomat	Sausage and tomato	Lost the election to Taco
	Grandiosa Porsjonspizza	Portion Pizza	Small, plate-sized version of the original Grandiosa.
2006	Grandiosa Lørdagspizza	Meatballs, beef, onion, red bell pepper and a dip	Translates to Grandiosa – Saturday Pizza. Needs extra sour cream for dip.
2007	Grandiosa Full Pakke	Meatballs, dip, pepperoni and ham.	Translates to Grandiosa – Full Package
2007	Grandiosa Speltpizza	Ham, mozzarella and spelt crust.	Translates to Grandiosa – Spelt Pizza
2009 and 2016	Grandiosa Uten Paprika: Ute på Prøve	Same as the original, but without red bell pepper	Translates to Grandiosa Without Red Bell Pepper; Out on Parole. A limited tryout release from January until May 2009 as a courtesy to those that pick off the red bell pepper on the original Pizza Grandiosa In 2016, this variant was re-released as a co-operation with grocery store chain REMA 1000, and as a result is only sold in REMA 1000 stores. It's "ute på prøve" (out on parole) this time around as well.
2012	Grandiosa - vår Hjemmelagde	Minced meat and more pizza sauce than usual.	Translates to Grandiosa - our Home-made. A family-sized, 1,2 kilogram "home-made" Grandiosa. Unlike the others it has a thick and soft crust.

== Gallery ==
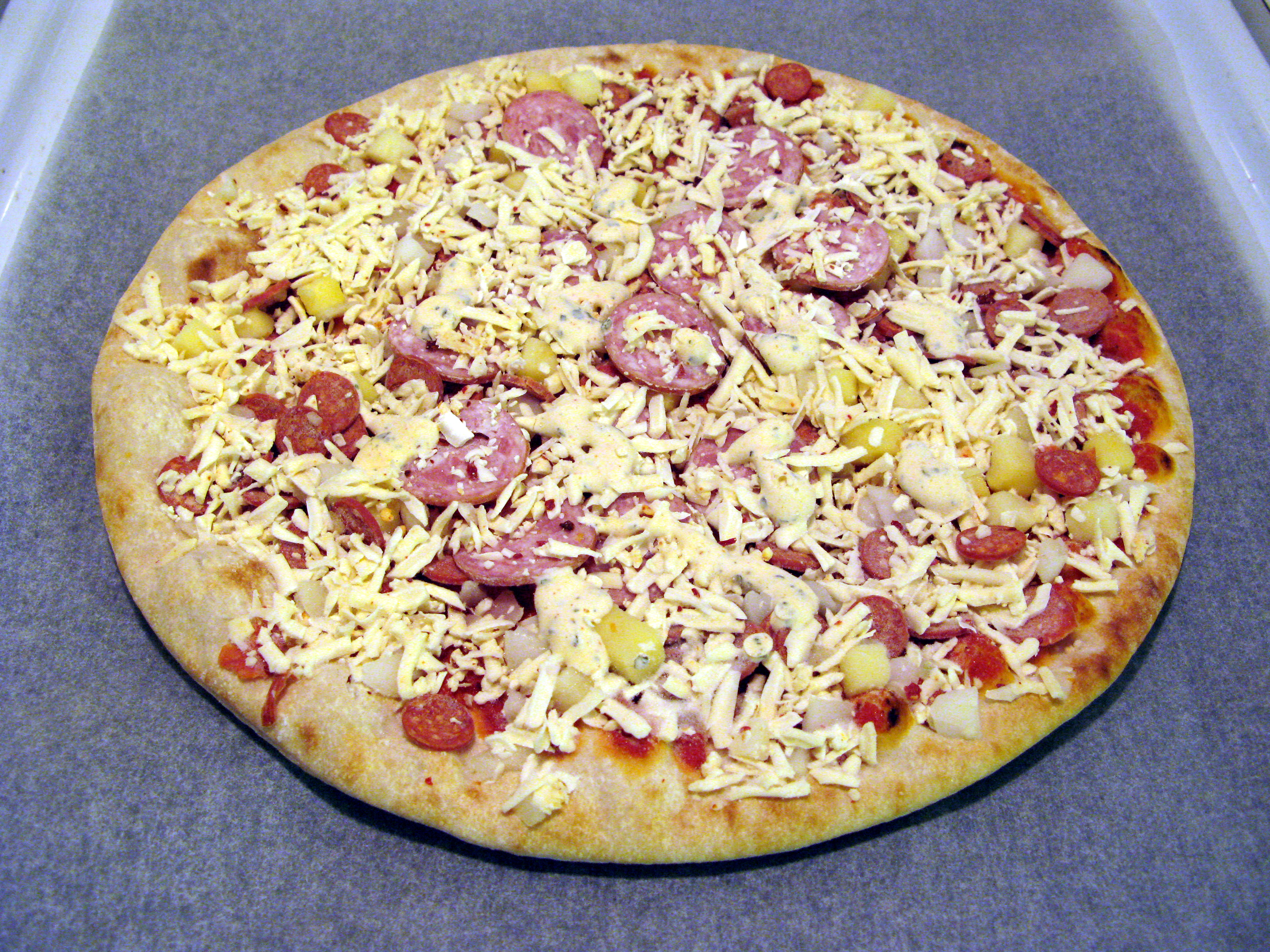
Pre-baked double salami Grandiosa pizza

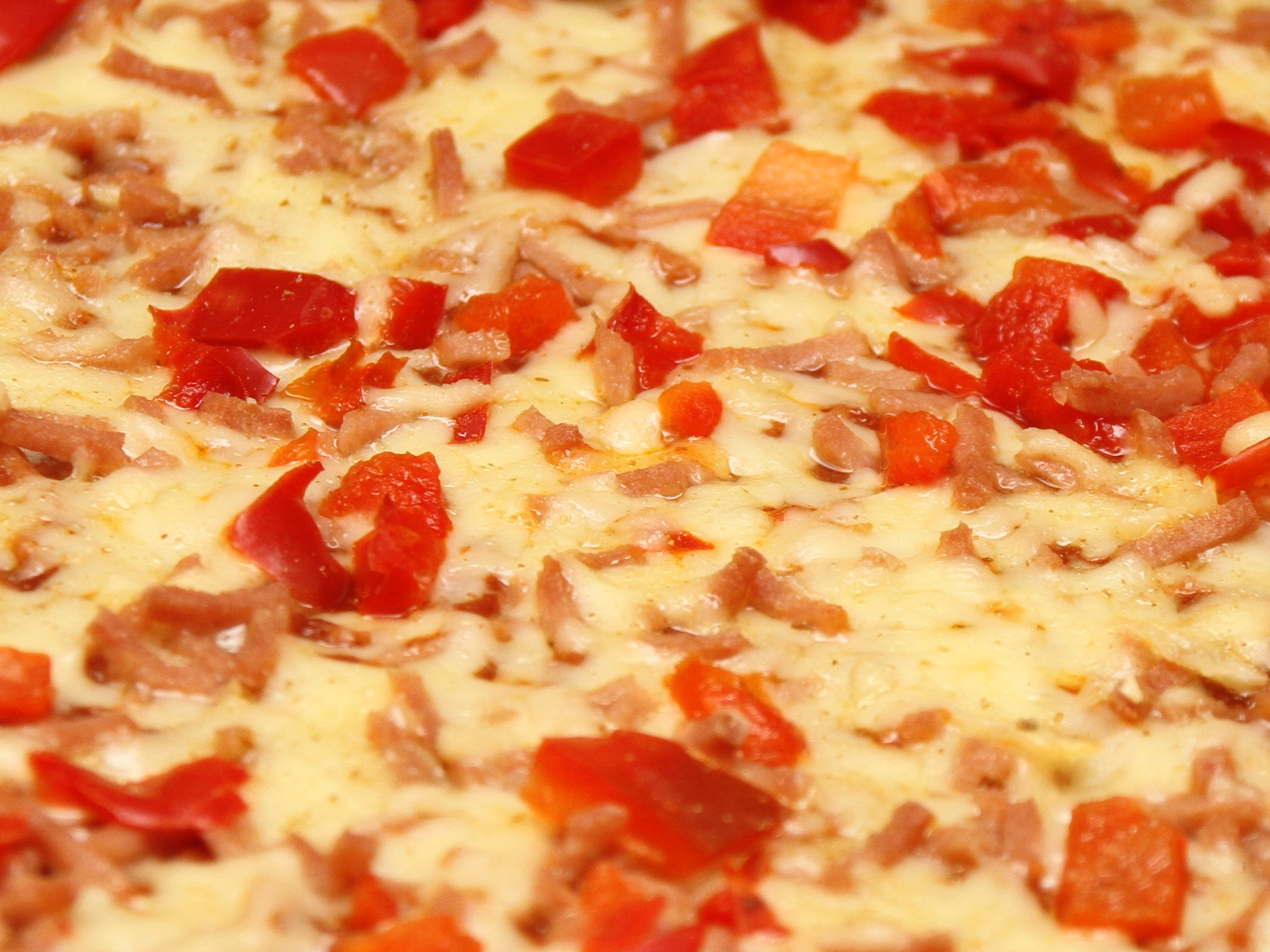
Close-up of a baked Grandiosa pizza

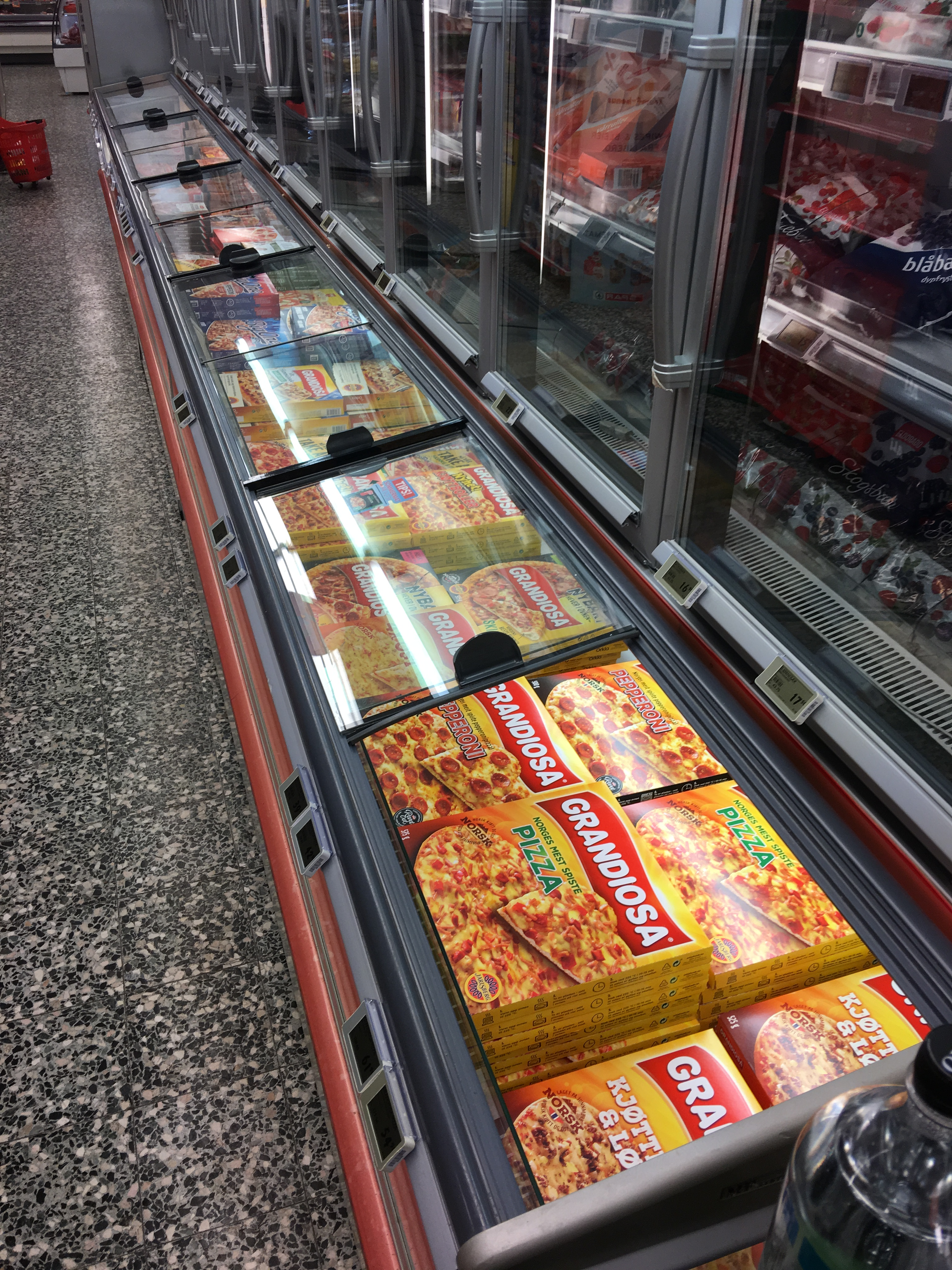
Grandiosa pizza varieties in a chest freezer at Spar Supermarket in [[Tjøme (village)|]], Norway

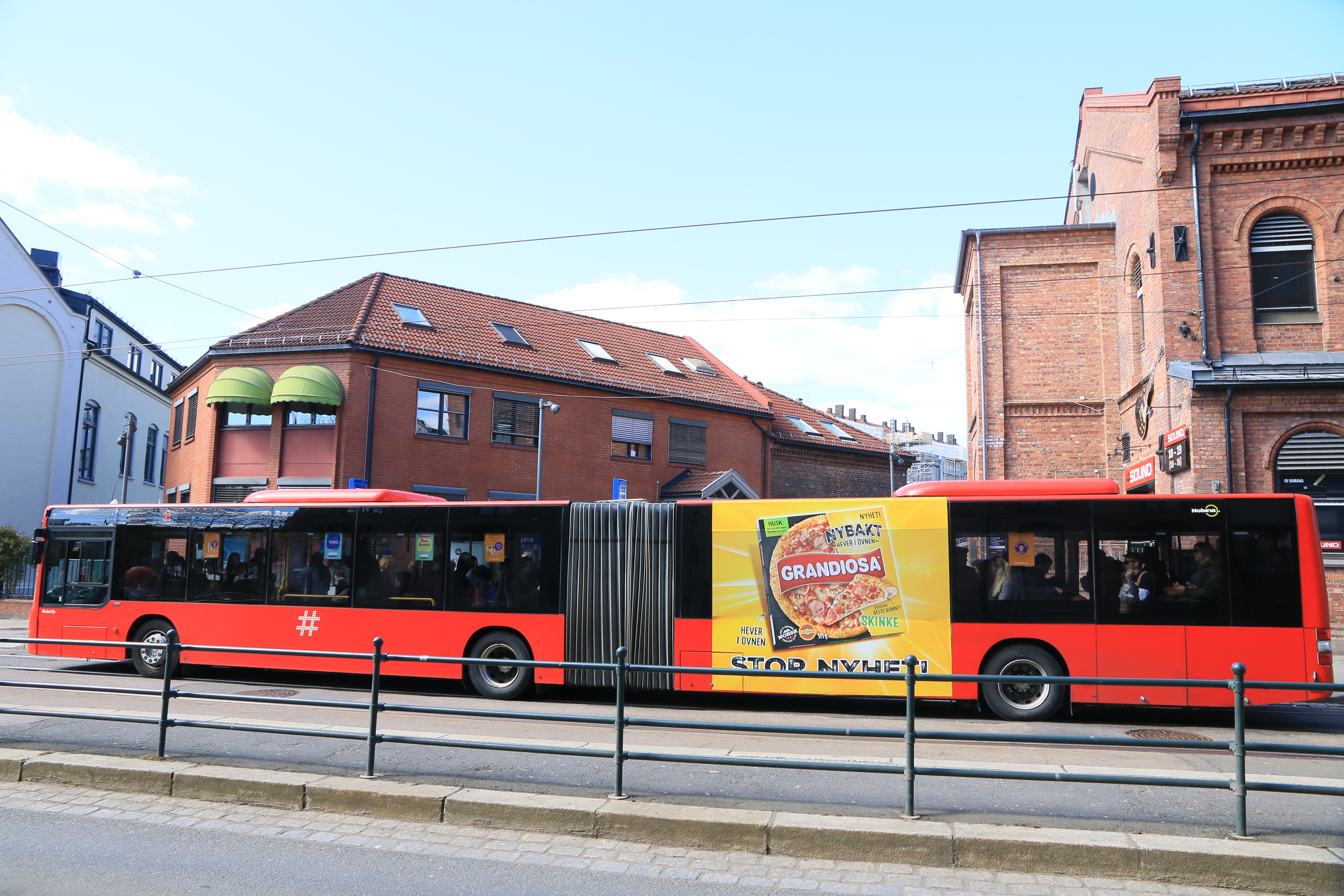
Advert for Grandiosa pizza on a bus in Oslo, Norway

== See also ==
- List of frozen food brands
