= Jordan (dental company) =

Norwegian manufacturing company

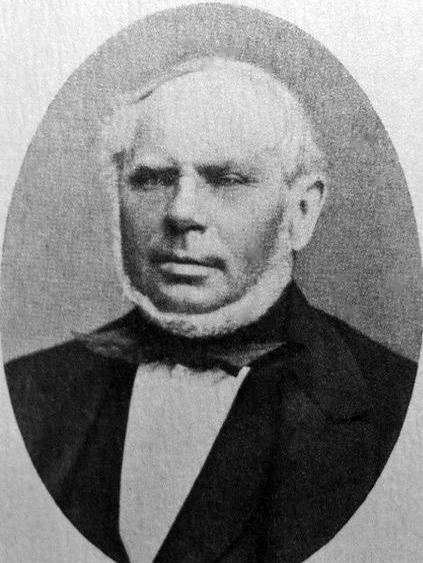
Wilhelm Jordan, founder

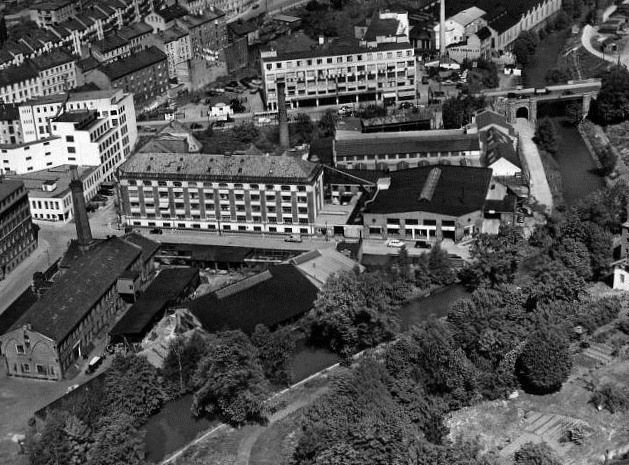
Jordan's factory (1952)

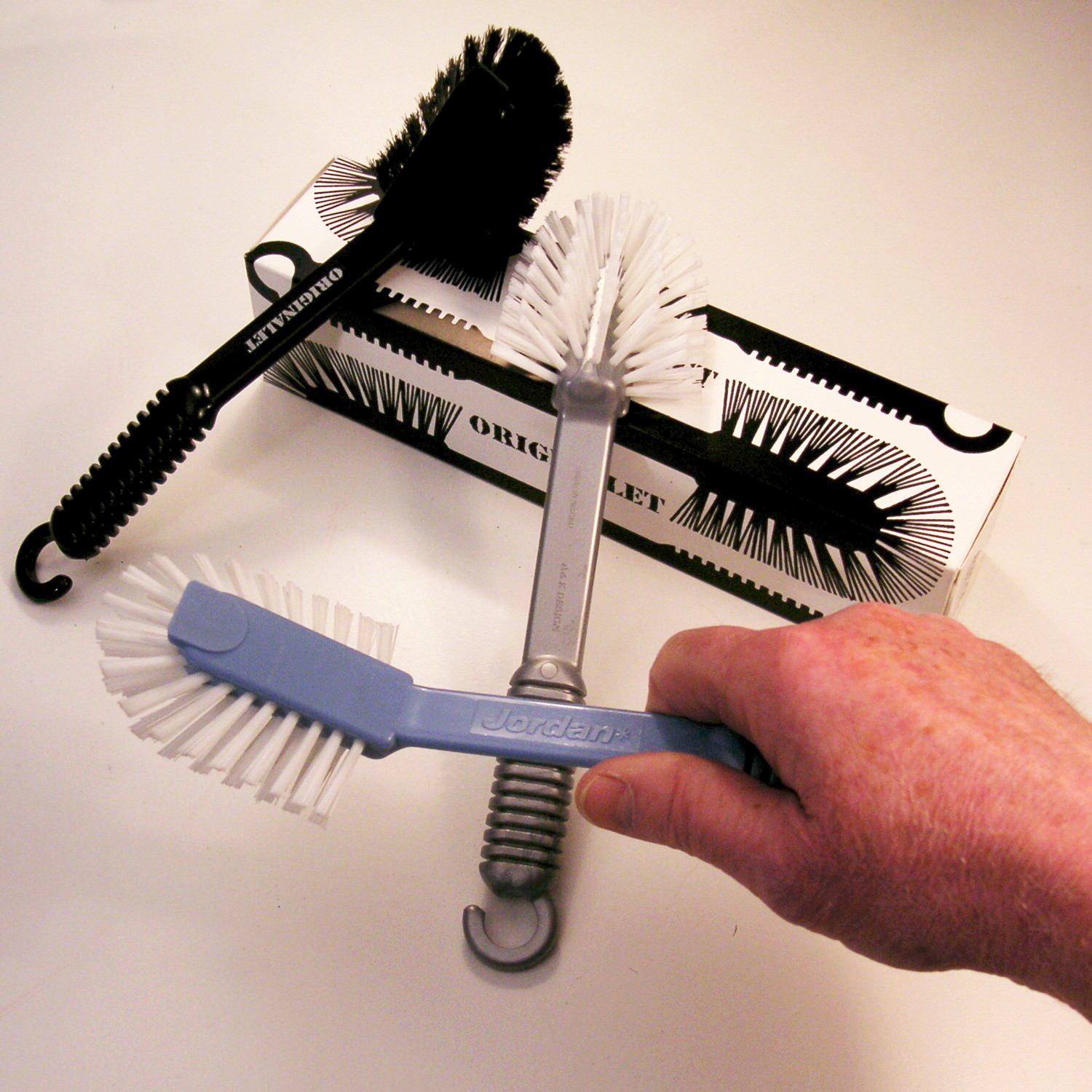
Jordan dishwashing brush (1970s)

Jordan is a multinational manufacturing corporation based in Oslo, Norway which specializes in dental hygiene and brushes.

It was established by the Danish immigrant Wilhelm Jordan as W. Jordan Börste & Penselfabrik in 1837. Originally a manufacturer of combs, the company expanded into brushes. In 1927 it took up toothbrush manufacturing, with an emphasis on international export from 1960. From 1966 it also produced toothpicks. It now produces dental hygiene products as well as painting brushes and cleaning brushes. Jordan has also acquired companies like dental floss producer Peri-dent (in 1987).

The first production was located in Oslo. In 1969 an additional factory was opened at Flisa. The Oslo factory was closed in 2000 and toothbrushes moved from Flisa to England in 2002. Flisa still produces toothpicks and cleaning equipment. Mainly through daughter companies, Jordan also controls production in India, China and Malaysia as well as a sales company in Malaysia. Jordan was itself acquired by the Orkla Group in 2012.
