= Maiasmokk =

Cafe in Tallinn, Estonia

Coordinates: 59°26′17.40″N 24°44′43.71″E

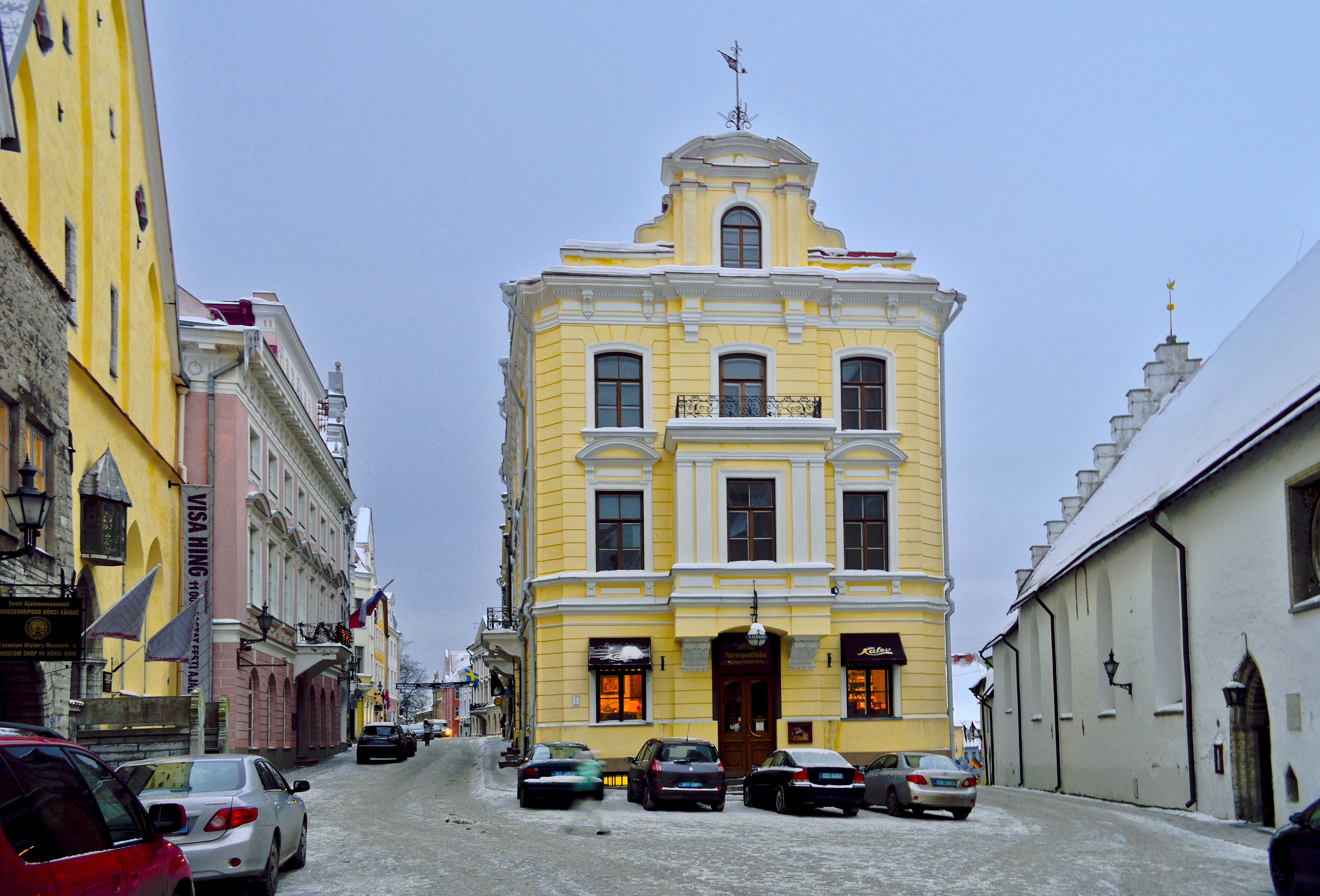
Maiasmokk is located in the ground floor of the yellow building in the centre

Maiasmokk (Estonian: sweet tooth, literally 'sweet lip') is a historical café in Tallinn, the capital of Estonia. In its current form it dates back to 1864, making it the oldest operational café in Estonia. The premises also contain a museum about the history and uses of marzipan. It is currently owned by the Kalev company.

== Location and description ==
=== Café ===
The official website of the Maiasmokk says that the café "offers you fresh pastries, pies and cakes made at the cafe as well as delicious handmade candies." It also has hot coffee offered in a variety of forms. The café has two floors. The coffee-house is located at the intersection of Pikk and Pühavaimu streets, in the Old Town of Tallinn. It lies diagonally opposite the Church of the Holy Ghost, the Russian embassy, and the Great Guild (housing parts of the Estonian History Museum). The interior of the café has remained unchanged for almost a century.

=== Museum ===
Apart from the café, the premises also contain a room with an exhibition about the history and uses of marzipan. The Kalev Marzipan Museum Room has around 200 marzipan figures, made from molds over 100 years old, and features marzipan painting and lectures. A marzipan artist, who does the marzipan painting, is always located in the museum.

== History ==
Maiasmokk is said to be the oldest cafe which is still operational in Estonia. The history of the coffee-house goes back to August 11 1806, when sugar baker Lorenz Cavietzel obtained the right to the land on which the present building stands. It was the first sugar bakery was established here, but it was not until 1864 that the presently visible café was constructed. In 1864, the property was bought and redeveloped by the Baltic German confectioner Georg Stude, and a café has operated in the premises since then. During the late 19th century, the coffee-house became renowned for its marzipan production, and clients buying marzipan included the Russian Imperial family. At the beginning of the 20th century, prior to World War I, the café received several valuable awards. In 1941, the company became nationalised, but the café continued to operate during the Soviet occupation of Estonia. In 1997, after Estonia had re-gained its independence, the café was registered as a private enterprise. A majority of the shares were bought by Kalev in 2004, and it is today (2015) a part of the Kalev company. In 2006 the Estonian Post Office created a postage stamp to celebrate the 200th anniversary of the cafe. In 2010, Kalev also bought the house in which the café is located.
