= Chips (company) =

Potato chips manufacturer based in Åland, Finland

The Chips Group (formerly Taffel Chips) was a company based in Åland, an autonomous territory of Finland, producing potato chips (i.e. crisps, in British English) and other savoury delights since the establishment of Chips Ab Suomi in 1969 as the first potato chips producer in the country. The company was bought by the Norwegian Orkla ASA in 2005 together with Oy Panda Ab. Production of snacks and frozen potato products still continues in Haraldsby, Åland as part of Orkla Confectionery & Snacks Finland Ab. This business is integrated within the group as part of Orkla Suomi, one of its four business areas in Finland.

Four kilograms of potatoes are needed to produce one kilogram of Taffel chips.

In 2013, Chips and Panda merged into Orkla Confectionery & Snacks Finland.
