= Panda (Finnish company) =

Finnish confectionery company

Panda Oy
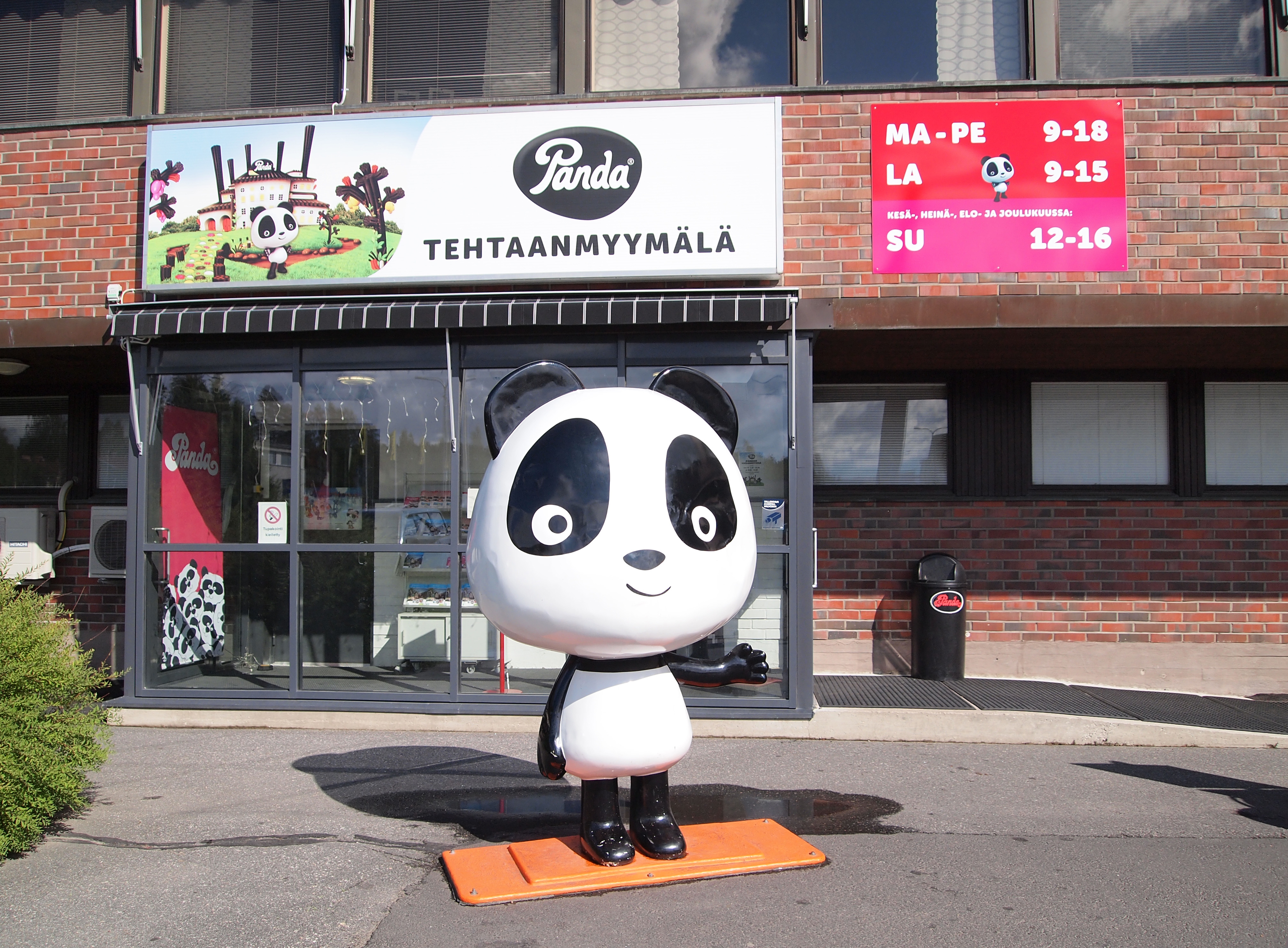
- Type: Osakeyhtiö
- Industry: Confectionery processing
- Founded: 1920
- Headquarters: Vaajakoski, Jyväskylä, Finland
- Area served: Worldwide
- Products: Confectionery
- Revenue: €51.345 million (2012)
- Owner: Orkla Group
- Number of employees: 272 (2012)
- Parent: Felix Abba
- Website: pandalicorice.com

Panda Oy is a Finnish confectionery company based in Vaajakoski, Jyväskylä. The company was founded in 1920 by SOK (Suomen Osuuskauppojen Keskuskunta). In 2005, the company was purchased by Felix Abba. Panda is known for its liquorice and chocolate products, with both categories having been produced at its main Vaajakoski facility for several decades.

== History ==
=== The early stages ===
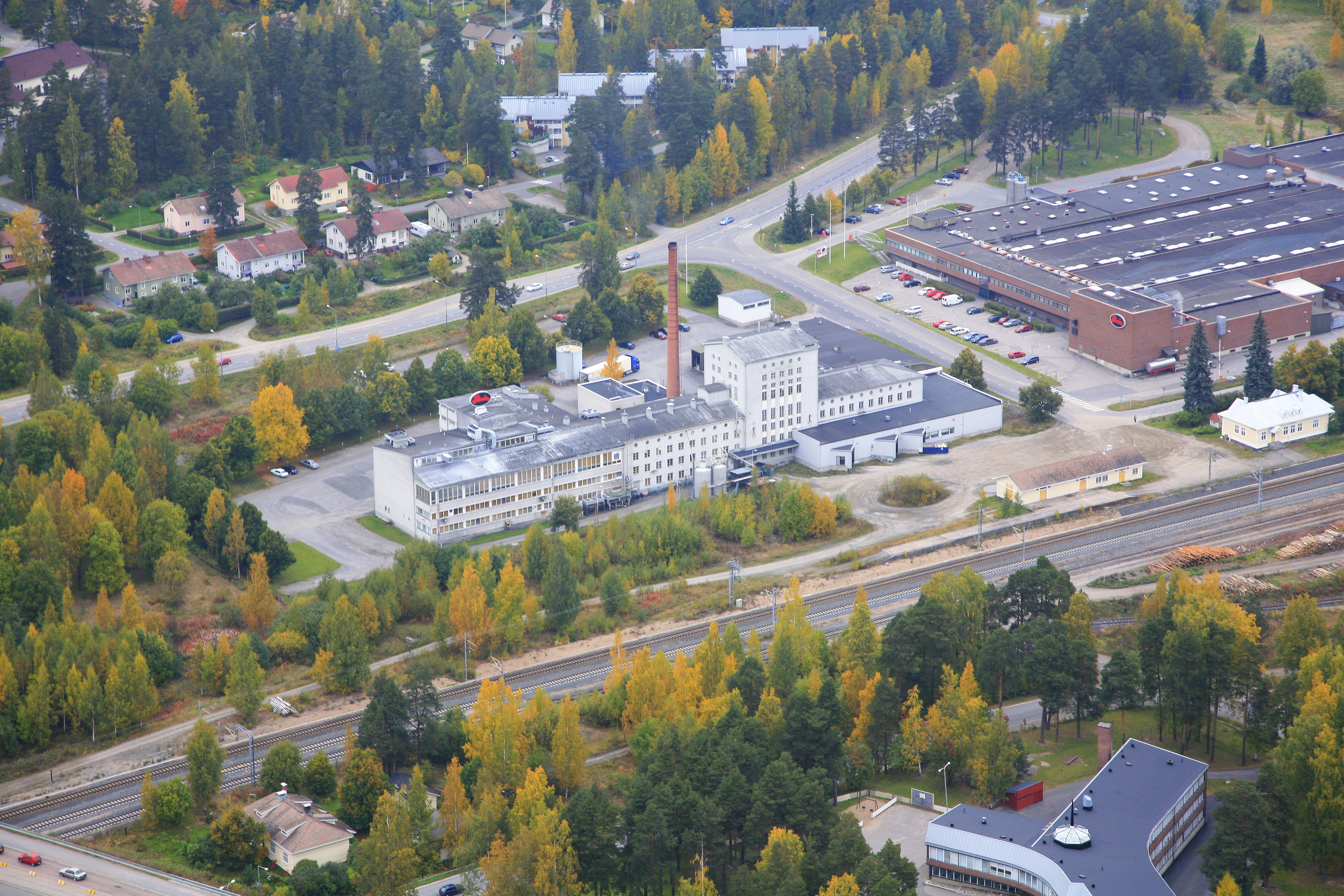
Panda's factory site in Vaajakoski.

SOK founded Panda in 1920. The name then was simply SOK's confectionery factory. In 1929, it moved to an extension built next to the margarine factory. In the early years, the product selection consisted only of hard candies and marmalade. The production of chocolate began in the new building, and liquorice began to be produced in the following decade.

During the war years, the product selection was reduced, and at the end of 1942, only carrot marmalade was available, but during the shortage, even this went like hot stones. After the war, regulation made confectionery production difficult, but in the 1950s, even this became easier and the industry began to grow rapidly.

=== Rebranding as Panda ===
In 1952, the company printed a figure of a panda on the wrappers of chocolate bars. They became so popular that the factory changed its name to Panda in the 1960s. In 2005, the company was sold to Felix Abba, which is part of the Norwegian Orkla Group.

== Products ==
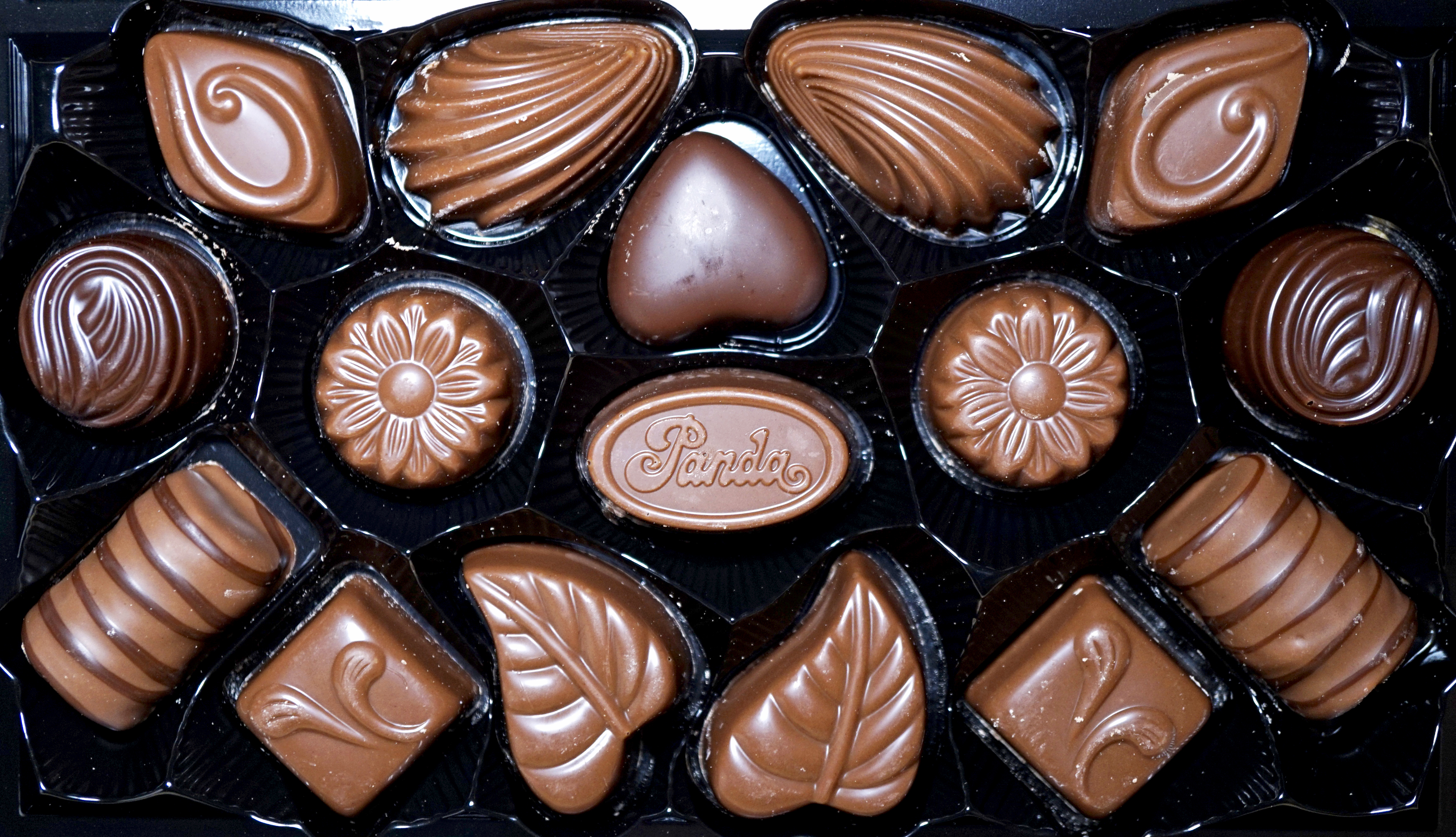
Panda's "Juhlapöydän Konvehteja" chocolate box in 2017.

A display of Panda candies

Panda produces diverse range of confectionery products, with a particular emphasis on liquorice and chocolate. The iconic Panda black liquorice has been manufactured in Finland since 1927 and remains a market leader domestically and in key export markets. This classic liquorice is known for its soft texture and simple, natural ingredients: traditionally molasses, wheat flour, liquorice extract, and aniseed oil, produced using methods that have changed little since the company's early days.

Alongside its liquorice, Panda also produces an extensive assortment of chocolates. The Juhlapöydän konvehdit (Celebration Table Pralines) box, introduced in 1967, has become a staple of Finnish festive traditions and remains among the country's most popular chocolate assortments, particularly during the Christmas season. The chocolate range includes classic milk, dark, and white chocolate bars, alongside filled chocolates in a variety of flavors such as toffee, mint, and pineapple.

== See also ==
- List of Finnish companies
- List of confectionery brands
