= Taffel =

Finnish brand of potato chips and other snacks

- Founded: 1969
- Parent: Orkla Confectionery & Snacks Finland

Taffel is a Finnish brand of potato chips produced by Orkla Confectionery & Snacks Finland. Taffel potato chips are produced in Åland, and it was the first product of the Orkla factory. The Taffel brand also includes dipping sauces, French fries, popcorn and nut mixes. According to research by Markkinointi & Mainonta magazine and Taloustutkimus, Taffel was Finland's most valued brand of potato chips in 2015.

== History ==
Ab Chips Oy Ltd was founded in 1969. In 1973 the factory employed 31 people working on Taffel. Originally a bag of Taffel chips weighed 75 grams. Aluminium bags were used in the factory. Juustosnacks (puffed fried cheese snacks) were introduced in the 1970s.

In 1987, De Danske Spritfabrikker, Taffel's second-largest owner, planned to sell its shares to Fazer, which was Taffel's largest owner. De Danske Spritfabrikker ended up selling its shares to the Ålandians.

In 1991 the Norwegian company Orkla ASA bought a tenth of the company. In 1995 Taffel introduced a line of chips called Kartanon perunalastut ('[the] manor's chips') onto the market.

In 2000 Ab Chips Oy Ltd and Orkla founded Scandinavian Snack Company together. The company is the largest potato chips producer in the Nordic countries: it produces 90,000 tons of snacks per year. In 2005 Orkla announced it would buy all of the company's stock.

In 2016 Orkla announced corporate negotiations concerning its entire Åland factory and was considering closing the Taffel factory down. The company later decided to continue production in Åland. In 2019 the factory won Orkla's internal development award.

The company use to sell packets called "MegaPussi" until chaging it to "Megapacket".
