= Oliver Kruuda =

Estonian entrepreneur and sport figure (born 1967)

Oliver Kruuda (born 27 February 1967 in Põlva) is an Estonian entrepreneur and sport figure.

Since 1998 he is the president of the Estonian Handball Association.

He has been the major shareholder of the company Kalev.

In 2005, he was awarded with Order of the White Star, IV class.

In 2000–2011, Oliver was a manager of AS Kalev (renamed AS Luterma in 2007).

In 2010–2016, he was a Member of the board of Tere AS.

He lives in Dublin, Ireland as of October 2020.

== Offences ==
In 2020, he was found guilty of submitting false information on his 2015 and 2016 income tax returns.

In 2021, he was declared bankrupt as a private individual, as he owed a debt of 15 million euros.

In 2023, he was given a suspended prison sentence for a tax crime.
