= Braye Beach Hotel =

Hotel in Alderney

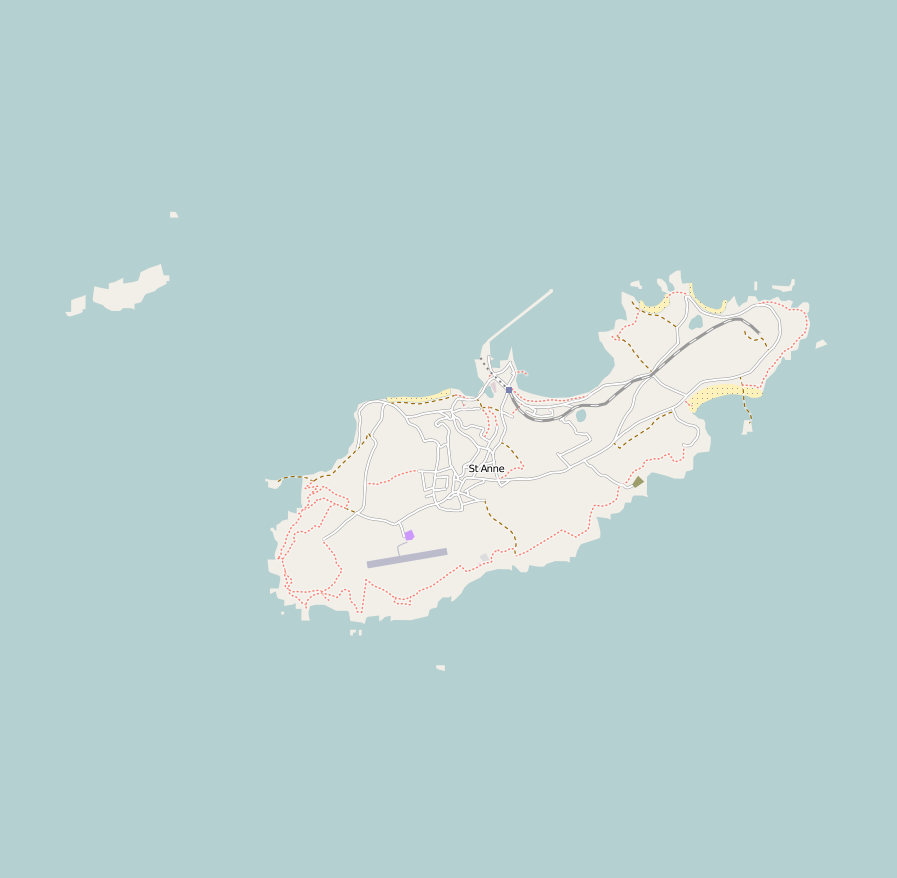
- Location in Alderney

General information
- Location: St Anne, Alderney
- Coordinates: 49°43′22″N 2°12′0″W
- Owner: Vista Hotels Group

Braye Beach Hotel is a 4-star hotel, considered to be the best in Alderney. The white hotel lies near the Braye Harbour on the beach in St Anne, Alderney.
