= Nugatti =

Norwegian chocolate spread

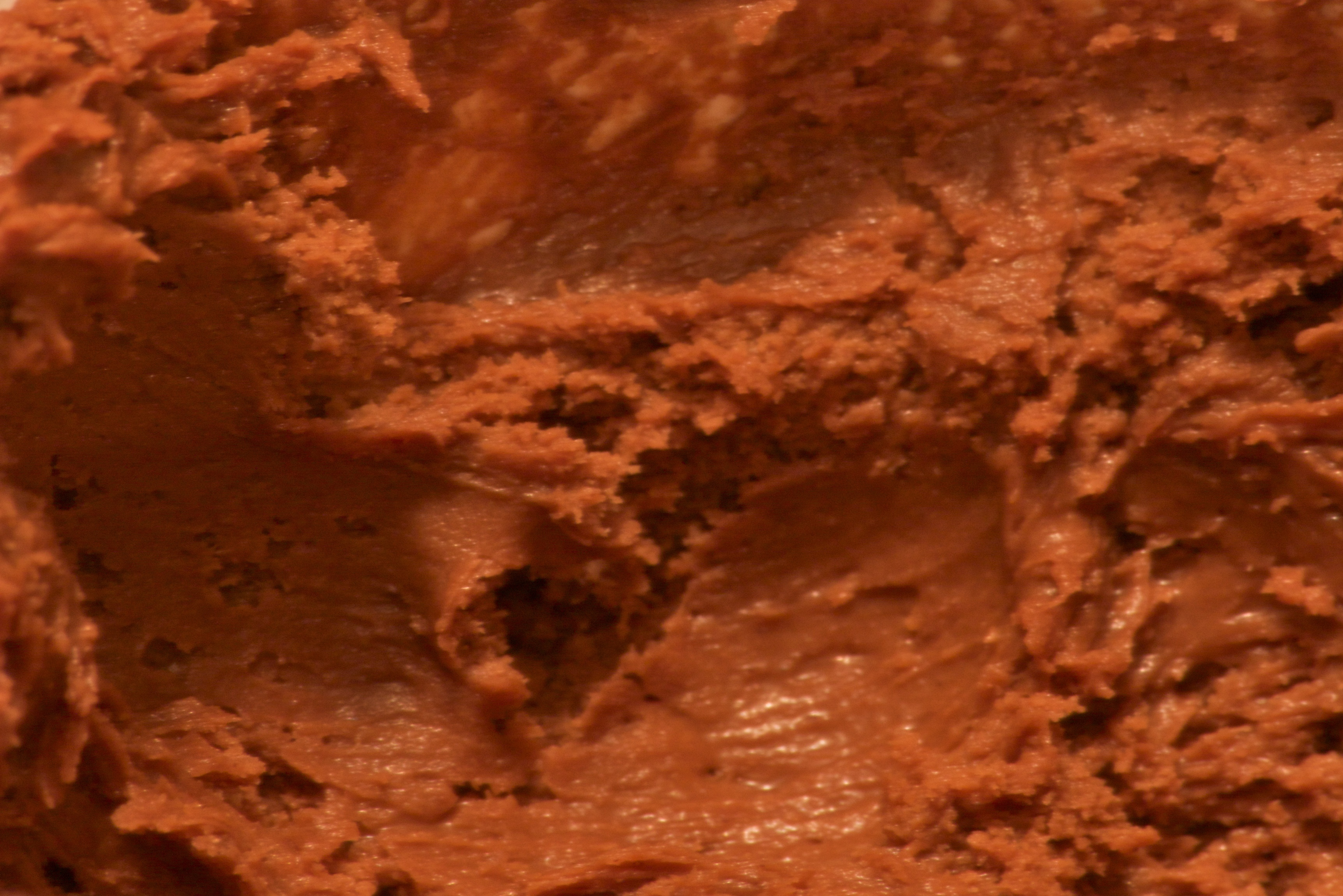
Nugatti (close-up)

Nugatti is a Norwegian brand of chocolate spread made from hazelnuts and nougat. It comes in ordinary or economy-sized plastic tubs, or the latest addition, a small red tube, similar to toothpaste tubes, and is produced by Stabburet.

It was introduced for sale in Finland in the autumn of 2020.

== Types ==
There are 8 different types of Nugatti.

- Nugatti The original
- Nugatti Crisp Has small crispy granules added to it
- Nugatti Max Has 33% less sugar than the original
- Nugatti Air Is made by adding air bubbles to the chocolate spread, making it softer and with lighter texture
- Nugatti Krønsjy Has small salty corn chips in it
- Nugatti Melkesjoko Is made with milk chocolate
- Nugatti Salt karamell Has caramel, salt added to it
- Nugatti Twist Is a swirl of milk and white chocolate spread

== See also ==
- Nutella
