= Orrdalsklint =

Highest point on the autonomous region of Åland Islands in Finland

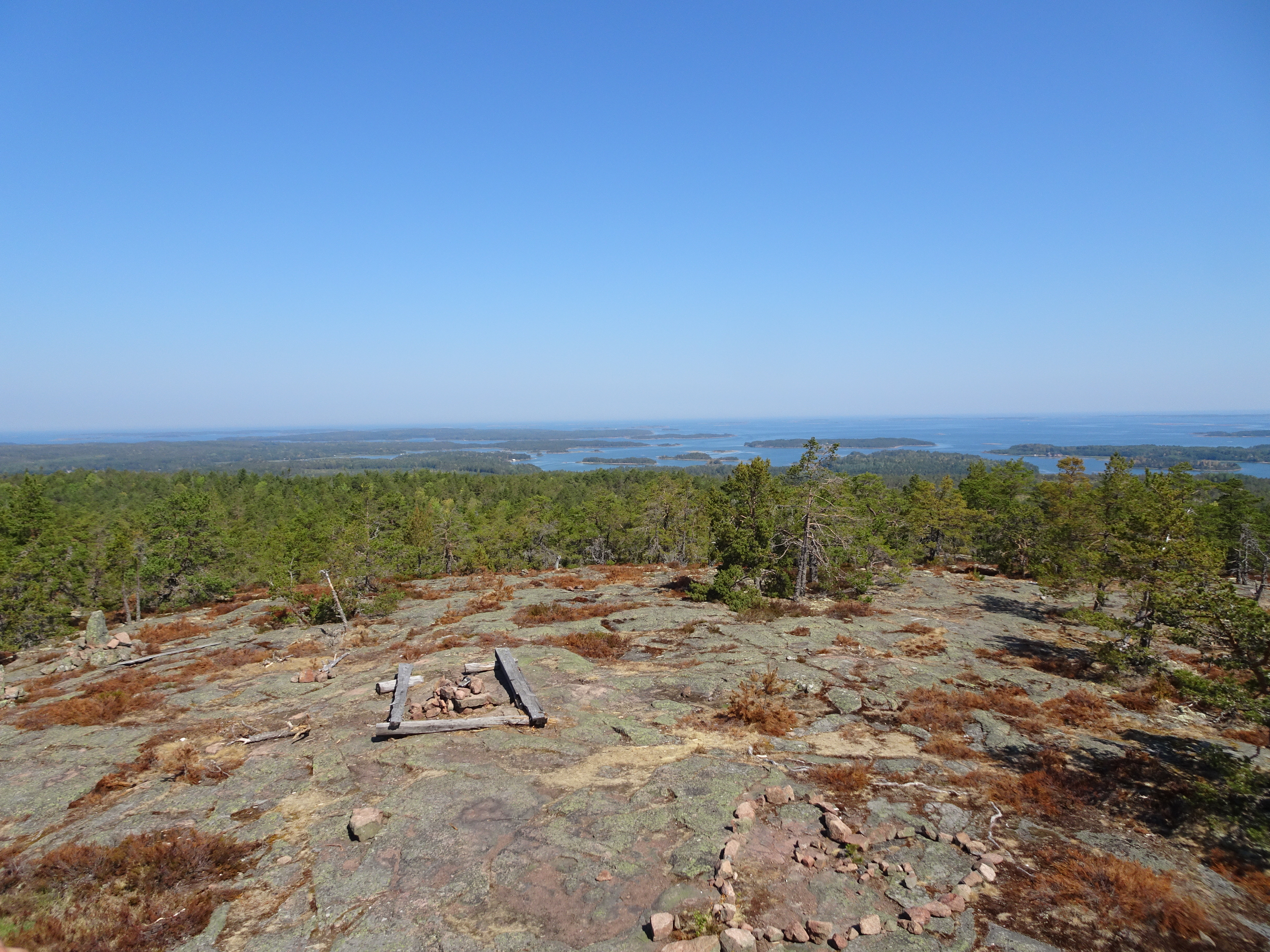
- Top of Orrdalsklint.

Highest point
- Elevation: 129.1 m (424 ft)
- Prominence: 129.1 m (424 ft)
- Coordinates: 60°19′42″N 20°7′16″E

Geography
- Location: Saltvik, Åland

Orrdalsklint, at 129.1 metres (423.6 ft) above sea level, is the highest point on the autonomous region of Åland in Finland. The hill is located in the municipality of Saltvik, some 7 kilometers Northeast of the town center.

An observation tower and a cabin for hikers are located on the top.

Orrdalsklint would be one of the first parts of Åland to rise out of the sea 10,000 years ago. The first people from the Comb Ceramic culture and Pitted Ware culture would arrive to Orrdalsklint about 6,000 years ago. During World War I a military guard hose would be built on top of Orrdalsklint. The observation tower and cabin were built during World War II for air observation.

== See also ==
- List of islands by highest point
