= Stabburet =

Norwegian food brand

- Founded: 1943; 83 years ago
- Headquarters: Norway
- Parent: Orkla Foods

Stabburet is a Norwegian food producer founded by Gunnar Nilsen in 1943. Stabburet started as a food store in 1936. The company began manufacturing food products in 1943. Stabburet is a part of Orkla Foods, and has nine factories in Norway. It sells well-known brands, such as Grandiosa, Big One, Nugatti, Fun Light, Idun and Chef.
