= Sætre (company) =

Norwegian biscuit company

Sætre AS
- Industry: biscuits
- Founded: 15 September 1883
- Founder: Hans Otto Røhr
- Headquarters: Oslo, Norway
- Key people: Christoffer Jahr (CEO)
- Owner: Orkla Group
- Website: www.saetre.no

Sætre (Norwegian: [ˈsæːtər]; Norwegian for "Sætre Biscuit Factory") is a Norwegian biscuit company. It was established in 1883 by Hans Otto Røhr at Sætre farm in Heggedal in Asker. After a fire, production moved to Kristiania in 1905, and a new factory opened at Kolbotn in 1963, with administration following in 1967. In 2000 production in Norway was discontinued and moved to Kungälv in Sweden.

The company was owned by Borregaard from 1984 and became part of the Orkla Group through the 1991 merger of Orkla and Borregaard. Sætre produces the majority of cookies sold in Norway.

== History ==
In 1883 Hans Otto Røhr (1836–1912) started a biscuit factory on the farm at Heggedal in Asker. He had been to England and learned biscuit baking in the 1860s, and set up his first biscuit factory in Drammen in 1871, but after a fire and financial difficulties he left Drammen and started again in Asker in 1883. The master baker was brought in from England, as was common for skilled workers, while Røhr had designed the machines himself and fired the ovens with wood. Located in the countryside in Asker, he bought raw materials such as milk and eggs locally, and rail transport to the main market in Oslo was important to the siting. Power was taken from the Verkselven by means of belt transmission.

The company became a joint-stock company in 1897 but ran into serious financial difficulties, partly because of the termination of the trade agreement between Norway and Sweden, Sweden being an important market for Sætre. The factory was nearly bankrupt after a bitter dispute between Røhr and the board, and Røhr stepped down in 1900. Wilhelm Oscar Ziener was hired in 1905, first as an agent and then as manager, and rebuilt the factory, but when it burned in 1905 it was not rebuilt in Heggedal but moved to Oslo.

=== Production and growth at Vålerenga ===
The work of building up the factory in Østerdalsgaten at Vålerenga went quickly, and biscuit production soon resumed. The company grew and struggled through the difficult years from 1914 to 1918, becoming known as a pioneer in workplace welfare and highlighted as a model company by the factory inspector Betzy Kjelsberg. Sætre had its own welfare building with changing rooms, showers, saunas, a function hall, and a kitchen. The new biscuit factory became a large workplace, especially for women, and the company had lodging houses for workers who came from the countryside. The workers were particularly young girls, often newly confirmed, and a dedicated social secretary looked after them, training them in personal finance and guiding them in how to manage on their own in the city.

When the overheated war economy collapsed in 1921, Sætre found itself in a very difficult situation. Wilhelm Ziener was dismissed and the company sold, and the new management, Harald Ohlsen & Co., managed to steer it through. In 1926 Sætre bought up its largest Norwegian competitors: Drammen Kjeksfabrikk, Erbe & Co in Trondheim, von Erpecom in Bergen, and Fr. Meyer in Oslo. The company kept growing, with sharp increases in the number of biscuit varieties, products, and employees, and despite the difficult interwar period it was heading toward new heights at the outbreak of war in 1940, having made larger investments in new equipment. The war wore heavily on buildings and equipment, and the company was defined as a strategic operation and produced for the Germans.

The postwar period brought new challenges. The economy was heavily regulated, and investments had to come as the authorities saw fit, so although Sætre needed new machines it could not buy them according to its own plans. Sætre did not return to its interwar range, which had featured many varieties with a large element of handwork; the wider world was based on mass production, and Sætre too had to follow this trend. By 1960 the site in Østerdalsgaten was fully built out and the factory too small, and a new production plant was completed at Kolbotn in 1963.

=== Industry at Kolbotn ===
In 1967 the company took the full step and moved its administration to Kolbotn. After five years Sætre merged with Oslo Kjeksfabrikk, and the whole operation was gathered in Kornmovegen 1 at Kolbotn. The 1970s were marked by reorganizations and efficiency drives that led to unsettled labor relations. In 1984 Borregaard became majority shareholder, and in 1991 Sætre became part of the Orkla group through the merger of Orkla and Borregaard.

The period after 1945 was marked by continual streamlining, with a reduction in the number of employees and adaptation to increasingly open international markets. Sætre worked actively with foreign factories on production agreements and acquisitions, and over time the company's role developed from being the strong party in the 1926 merger of the five largest biscuit factories to being taken over by larger players in the later decades.

=== From factory to housing ===
In 2000 production moved to more modern factory facilities in Sweden, ending large-scale Norwegian-made biscuits. After the factory closed, it was decided that the building would be replaced with housing, and Selvaag Bygg built a residential development with low blocks and homes suited to older people. The factory building was demolished in November 2010, with the mayor of Oppegård and the local newspaper present to mark both the sadness at the loss of the district's well-known industrial building and the gladness at the coming housing. The names Sætretunet and Kornmoenga remain as reminders of the operation that shaped the area for nearly 50 years.

== List of brands ==
Gjende is a cookie by Sætre, launched in 1954. The cookie exists in several variants, including Gjende Sjokolade (Chocolate), Gjende Vanilje (Vanilla), and Gjende Karamell (Caramel).

Ballerina is a cookie by Sætre, launched in 1993. The cookie exists in several variants, including Ballerina Original, Ballerina Nougat, Ballerina Melkesjoko (Milk Chocolate) and Ballerina Blåbærlykke (Blueberry).

Bixit is a series of cookies by Sætre, launched in 1991. The cookie mainly consists of oats, but exists in several variants, including Bixit Original, Bixit Sjokolade (Chocolate), Bixit Havrebar Quinoa & Bringebær (Quinoa & Raspberry) and Bixit Havrebar Mandel & Sjokolade (Almond & Chocolate).

Other Sætre brands include:

- Marie
- Per
- Ballerina
- Bokstavkjeks
- Kornmo
- Digestive
- Café Bakeriet

Many of the above brands have received praise from newspaper for being healthier than other well known Norwegian brands.
