= Orkla ASA =

Norwegian consumer goods conglomerate

- Type: Allmennaksjeselskap
- Traded as: Oslo Stock Exchange: ORK
- ISIN: NO0003733800
- Industry: Conglomerate
- Founded: 1904; 122 years ago
- Headquarters: Oslo, Norway (formally registered in Sarpsborg)
- Key people: Nils Selte (President & CEO); Vacant (Chairman)
- Products: Branded consumer goods, aluminium products, financial investments
- Brands: See § Brands
- Revenue: ▲US$6.42 billion (2024)
- Operating income: 5,100,000,000 Norwegian krone (2019)
- Net income: ▲US$492 million (2024)
- Total assets: ▲US$8.52 billion (2024)
- Total equity: ▲US$4.28 billion (2024)
- Number of employees: 19,500 (2024)
- Website: orkla.com

Orkla ASA (Norwegian: [ˈɔrkla]) is a Norwegian conglomerate operating in Europe, Asia and the US. At present, Orkla operates in the branded consumer goods, aluminium products and financial investment sectors. Orkla ASA is listed on the Oslo Stock Exchange and its head office is in Oslo, Norway. As of 31 December 2021, Orkla had 21,423 employees. The Group's turnover in 2021 totalled NOK 50.4 billion.

== Operations ==
Orkla's branded consumer goods division produces brands in many fields, primarily in the Nordic region, but also in other places such as Central and Eastern European countries, and the Baltic region. Among the companies owned by Orkla are Abba Seafood, Beauvais foods, Chips, Felix, Göteborgs Kex, Kalev, KiMs, Lilleborg, MTR Foods, Rasoi Magic, Peter Möller, Nidar, OLW, Panda, Procordia Food, Stabburet, Sætre, Pierre Robert Group and Laima.

As of February 2020 Orkla had major ownership in Jotun (42.6%). Borregaard was divested and listed on the Oslo Stock Exchange in 2012. Orkla's 50% interest of Sapa Group was sold in 2017.

== History ==
Orkla started out in 1654 with pyrite mining at Løkken Verk in Sør-Trøndelag, Norway. Later the company also started mining copper, but this was abandoned in 1845. In 1904 Orkla Grube-Aktiebolag was founded by Christian Thams to start commercial mining at Løkken Verk, which included the construction of Thamshavnbanen, the first electric railway in Norway, between Løkken Verk and Thamshavn. This railway is still operated as a museum railway after the mining operations at Løkken Verk were closed on 10 July 1987.

In 1929, Orkla became listed on Oslo Stock Exchange and in 1931 the new smelting plant at Thamshavn outside Orkanger was opened. By 1941 Orkla started with a separate investments portfolio, and opened offices in Oslo in 1975. In 1984 Orkla started a major takeover of Norwegian newspapers, creating Orkla Media as one of the three largest media companies in Norway. Half of the magazine publisher Egmont-Mortensen was added to Orkla Media in 1992 and the Danish Det Berlingske Officin in 2000. Orkla sold the media section to Mecom in 2006.

In 1986 Orkla merged with Borregaard based in Sarpsborg to form Orkla Borregaard. The company then merged with Nora Industrier in 1992. Borregaard was spun off and introduced to the Oslo Stock Exchange in October 2012, with Orkla retaining a minority stake in the company. Orkla heavily invested in foods and among others acquired Swedish brewery Pripps as well as other companies, including Abba Seafood, Baltic Beverages Holding and Procordia Food. Norwegian Ringnes and Pripps were merged with Carlsberg Breweries, where Orkla acquired a 40% ownership in 2000. Orkla sold its ownership in Carlsberg in 2004.

In 2005 Orkla bought the Norwegian material company Elkem and Sapa Group in Sweden. In 2010 Orkla bought the Estonian confectionery company Kalev.

In January 2011, Orkla sold Elkem to China National Bluestar.

In November 2018 Orkla announced that it will acquire Finnish Kotipizza Group.

In March 2022, Orkla Health announced it had acquired 100% of the shares of dietary supplements supplier Healthspan Group Limited for £65 million on a cash and debt-free basis.

== Brands ==
=== Orkla Foods ===
- Abba Seafood – seafood (Sweden)
- Ahti – herring
- Bähncke – condiments
- Banos – banana spread (Norway)
- Beauvais – condiments
- Big One – frozen pizzas (Norway)
- Big One Diner – American food
- Bjellands Fiskeboller – canned fish balls (Norway)
- Bob – juice, fruit preserves
- Boy – herring
- Den Gamle Fabrik – fruit preserves
- Denja – salads, herrings (Norway)
- Ejderns – caviar
- Ekstrom – desserts
- Everest – bottled water (Latvia)
- Felix – condiments, potatoes, vegetables
- Frödinge – desserts (Sweden)
- Fun Light – squash
- Geisha – rice products (Norway)
- Gimsøy Baker'n – baking ingredients
- Gimsøy Drinkmix – drink mix
- Glyngøre – herring
- Grandiosa – frozen pizzas
- Grebbestads – anchovies
- Gutta – juice (Latvia)
- Gøy – squash
- Hold-It – calzones
- Hållö – shellfish
- Idun – condiments (Norway)
- Jacky – yoghurts, puddings
- JOKK – juice
- K-salat – salads
- Kalles Kaviar – caviar (Sweden)
- Kokkeklar – soups
- Kung Gustaf – seafood
- Latplanta – spices (Latvia)
- Lierne – lefse
- Limfjord – seafood
- Liva Energi – energy drinks, protein drinks
- Lucullus – herring
- Løvstek – cube steak (Norway)
- Mors hjemmebakte flatbrød – flatbrød (Norway)
- Mr. Lee – instant noodles (Norway, Faroe Islands)
- Mrs. Cheng's – Asian food
- Nora – fruit preserves, canned vegetables, desserts, squash (Norway)
- Nugatti – chocolate spreads (by Stabburet, Norway; also sold in Finland)
- Nøtte – hazelnut butter (Norway)
- Pastella – pasta
- Paulúns – natural food
- Pizza Originale – frozen pizzas
- Risifrutti – fridged porridges
- SaritaS – Indian food (Norway)
- Sjokade – chocolate spreads (Norway)
- Spilva – condiments, canned vegetables, juices, ready meals (Latvia)
- Stabburet Leverpostei – leverpostej
- Stabburet Pai – frozen pies (Norway)
- Stabburet Picnic – canned ham
- Sunda – honey
- SUSLAVICIUS – condiments, fruit preserves
- Svennes – caviar
- Tomtegløgg – mulled wine
- Toro – soups, stews (including potato moussaka and beef stroganoff), desserts, spices, powdered drink mixes (Rieber & Søn, Norway; also sold in Iceland)
- Trondhjems – canned food (Norway)
- Truly Thai – Thai food
- Vesta – herring
- Vestlandslefsa – lefse (Norway)
- Vitana – bouilion powder, condiments (Czech Republic)
- Vossafår – cold cuts
- Önos – fruit preserves, squash

=== Orkla Snacks ===
- Ādažu čipsi – potato chips (Latvia)
- Ballerina – cookies
- Bamsemums – chocolate
- Bergene Melk – chocolate
- Bixit – cookies
- Bocca – chocolate
- Bubs - candy
- Café Bakeriet – cookies
- Caramello – chocolate
- Crispo – chocolate
- Cuba – chocolate
- Doc – throat lozenges
- Extra – chewing gum (distribution only)
- Fresh walk – sandwiches
- Fun Light – juice
- Gjende – cookies
- Göteborgs Kex – cookies
- Gullbrød – marzipan
- Hjemmelaget Julemarsipan – marzipan
- Hobby – chocolate
- Hubba Bubba – chewing gum (distribution only)
- IFA – throat lozenges
- Juicy Fruit – chewing gum (distribution only)
- Julegris – marzipan pig
- Julemarsipan – marzipan
- Kalev – chocolates, biscuits, cookies, marzipans, caramels (Estonia)
- KiMs – potato chips (Norway, Denmark)
- Knott – candy
- Kornmo – biscuits
- Krembanan – chocolate
- Kremtopper – chocolate
- Krokantrøffel – chocolate
- Laban – candy
- Laima – chocolate (Latvia)
- Laima sweets stores (Latvia)
- Laima chocolate museum (Latvia)
- Latfood – chips (Latvia)
- Mokkabønner – chocolate
- Mokkatrøffel – chocolate
- Nero – chocolate, liquorice (by Nidar, Norway)
- New Energy – chocolate
- Nidar – chocolates, bulk candy (Norway)
- OLW – potato chips
- Old Town Bakery – confectionery, cakes (Latvia)
- Panda – chocolate, liquorice candy (Finland)
- Panda Liqueur – chocolate
- Pauluns Wholemeal flakes, muesli, bars (Sweden)
- Pedro – salty snacks (Latvia)
- Polly – nuts (by KiMs Norge, Norway)
- Safari – cookies
- Sfinx – chocolate confections (by Nidar)
- Skipper – liquorice candy
- Smash! – chocolate (by Nidar, Norway)
- Selga – cookies and waffles (Latvia)
- Staburadze – confectionery and cakes (Latvia)
- Smørbukk – caramel
- Snøstenger – marzipan
- Stratos – chocolate
- Sætre – biscuits, cookies (Norway)
- Troika – chocolate
- Taffel The Original Snacks – salty snacks (Finland)

=== Orkla Care ===
==== Lilleborg ====
- Blenda – laundry products
- Comfort – fabric softeners
- Define – hair care products
- Dr. Greve – hygiene products
- Jif – cleaning products
- Jordan – dental hygiene products, cleaning supplies
- Klorin – chlorine products
- Krystal – cleaning products
- Lano – soap
- Lypsyl – moisturising lip balm (distribution only)
- Milo – laundry products
- Naturelle – soaps
- OMO – detergents
- Pepsodent – toothpaste (distribution only)
- Persil – laundry products
- Salmi – cleaning products
- Solidox – toothpaste
- Sterilan – deodorants
- Sun – dishwashing
- Svint – steel wool soap
- Zalo – dishwashing products

==== Orkla Health ====
- Collett – vitamin supplements
- CuraMed – throat lozenges
- Gerimax – ginseng products
- Gevita – vitamin supplements, mineral supplements, herbal remedies
- Litozin – rosehip powder
- Maxim – sports nutrition
- Möllers Tran – Omega-3 products
- Nutrilett – protein bars, dieting products
- Pikasol – Omega-3 supplements
- Sana-sol – vitamin supplements
- Triomar – Omega-3 supplements
- Vitaminbjørner – vitamin supplements
- Vivag – intimate care products

==== Pierre Robert Group ====
- La Mote – clothes
- Pierre Robert – clothes

=== Orkla Food Ingredients ===
- AMA – margarine
- Bakkedal – butter
- BaKo – baking equipment, cake decorations
- Bæchs Conditori – baked goods
- Candeco – cake decorations, ice cream decorations
- Credin – baking products
- Frima Vafler – ice cream cones
- Jästbolaget – yeast
- Kronjäst – yeast
- KåKå – baking products
- Mors Hjemmebakte – baking products
- Naturli' – organic beverages
- Nic – ice cream accessories
- Odense – marzipan, nougat, chocolate
- Sonneveld – professional baking products

== Other investments ==
- Gränges – aluminium (listed on the Stockholm Stock Exchange)
- Hydro Power – power plants
  - Sarp Falls – power plant
  - AS Saudefaldene (85%) – power plant
- Jotun (42.53%) – paint manufacturer
- Orkla Eiendom – real estate related to Orkla's own operations
