= Salvesen =

Salvesen is a surname. Notable people with the surname include:

- Alastair Salvesen (1941–2024), British billionaire businessman
- Anton Salvesen (1927–1994), Norwegian luger
- Britt Salvesen, American photography curator
- Edward Theodore Salvesen (1857–1942), Scottish lawyer, politician and judge
- Guy Salvesen, South African-born biochemist
- Harald Salvesen (1889–1972), Norwegian medical doctor, internist and academic
- Harold Salvesen (1897–1970), British businessman
- Henry Adolph Salvesen (1860–1924), Scottish mechanical engineer and naval architect
- Jens Salvesen (1883–1976), Norwegian sailor
- Kjartan Salvesen (born 1976), Norwegian reality TV personality
- Lars-Jørgen Salvesen (born 1996), Norwegian footballer
- Salve Andreas Salvesen (1909–1975), Norwegian politician
- Sylvia Salvesen (1890–1973), World War II resistance member
- Theodore Salvesen (1863–1942), Scottish soldier, businessman, and owner of Christian Salvesen

== See also ==
- Chr. Salvesen & Chr. Thams's Communications Aktieselskab, Norwegian electricity production and railway operation company
- Christian Salvesen, European transport and logistics company
- Salvesen Cove, cove forming the south extremity of Hughes Bay, along the west coast of Graham Land
- Salvesen Range, mountain range on the southern tip of South Georgia
- Salveson (surname)
