= JBH (disambiguation) =

JBH may refer to:

- Joe Bishop-Henchman
- Jenna Bush Hager
- Juvenile breast hypertrophy
- John Burnet Hall, the smallest capacity Hall of Residence owned by the University of St Andrews
- Jinhua railway station, the telegraph code JBH
- JB Hi-Fi, the ASX code JBH

== See also ==
- J. B. H. Wadia, a prominent Bollywood movie director
