= Victoria Park, Edinburgh =

District of Edinburgh, Scotland

Coordinates: 55°58′30″N 3°11′37″W

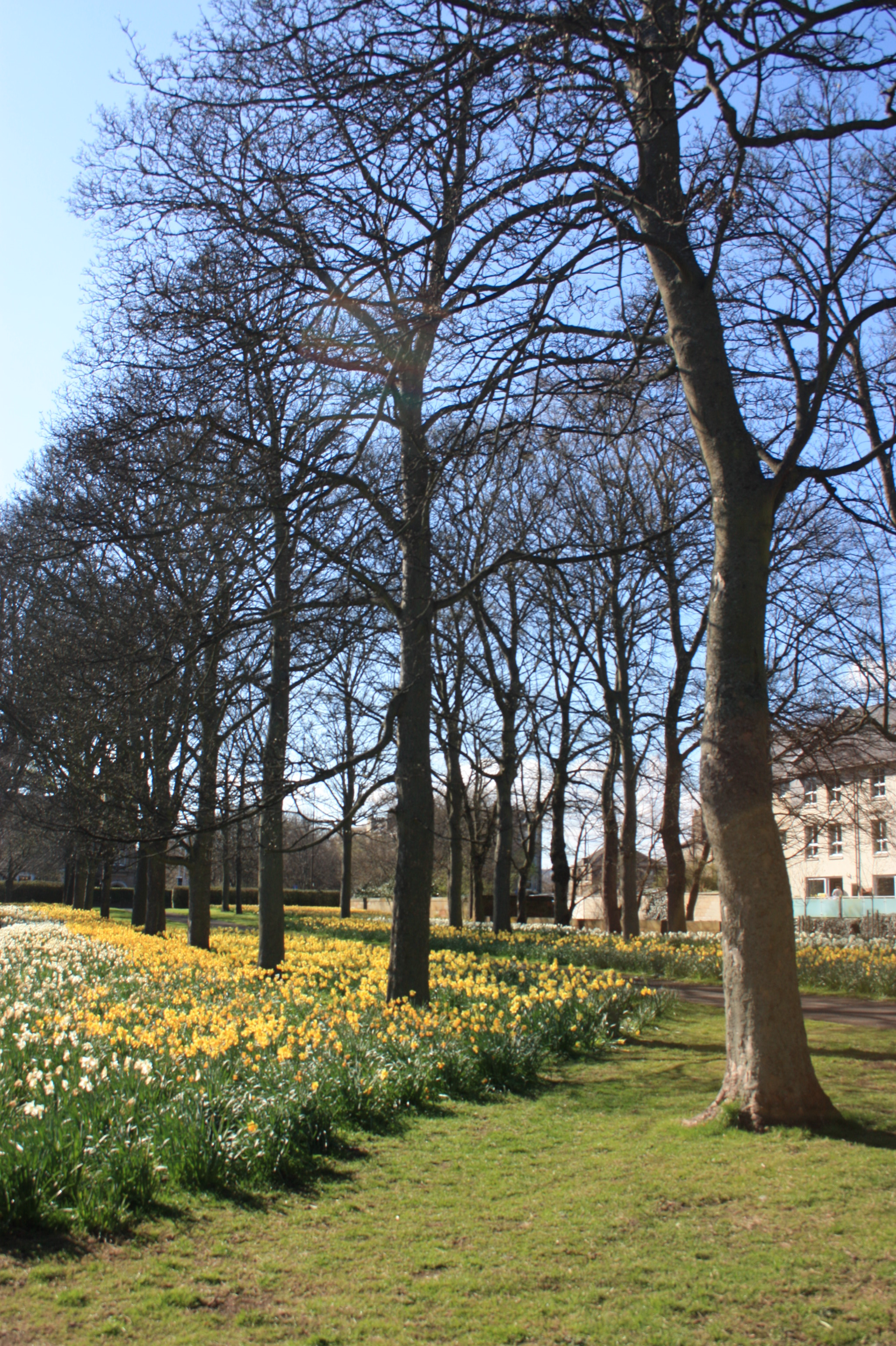
Victoria Park, Edinburgh in spring.

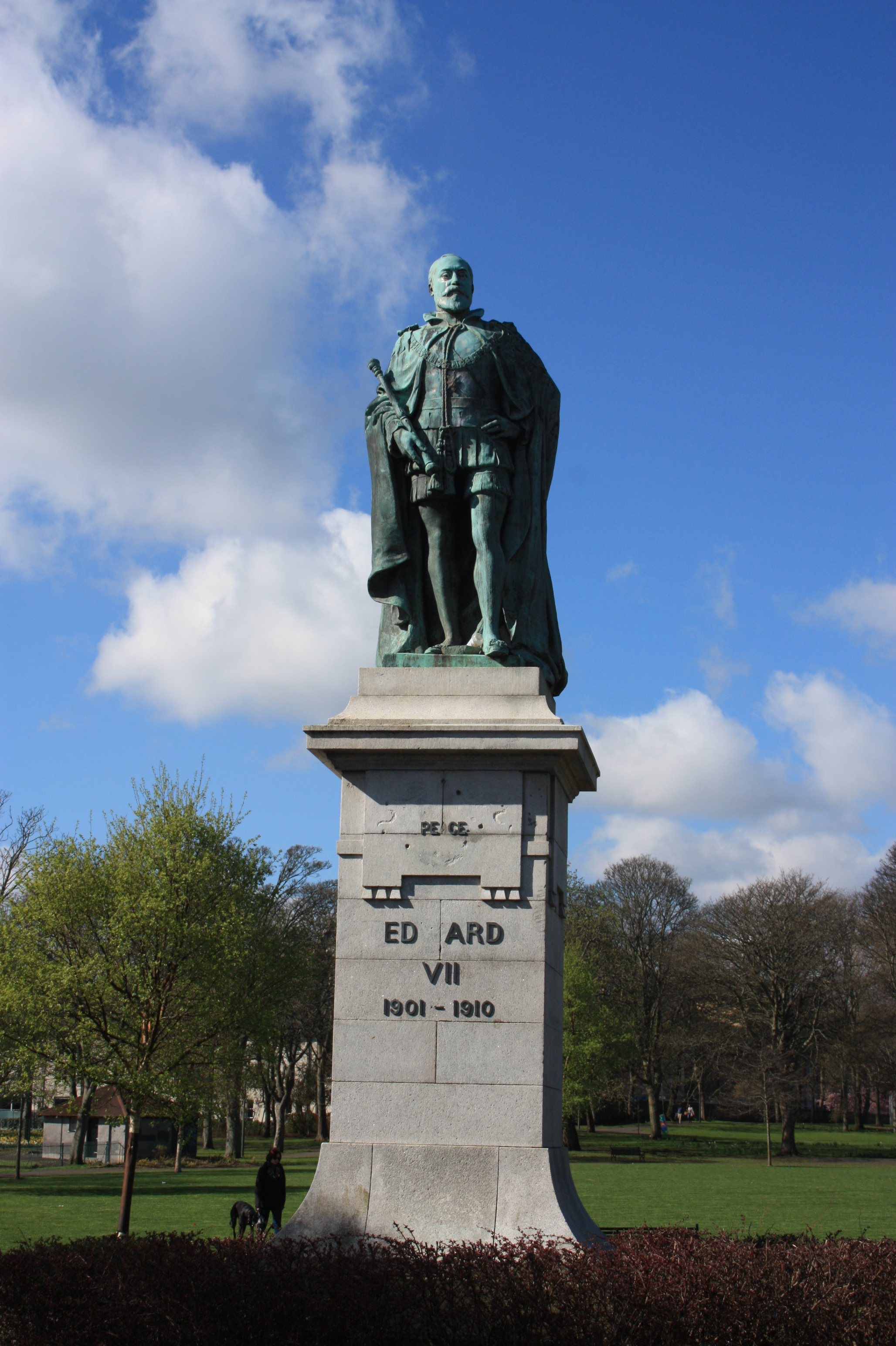
King Edward VII by John Stevenson Rhind

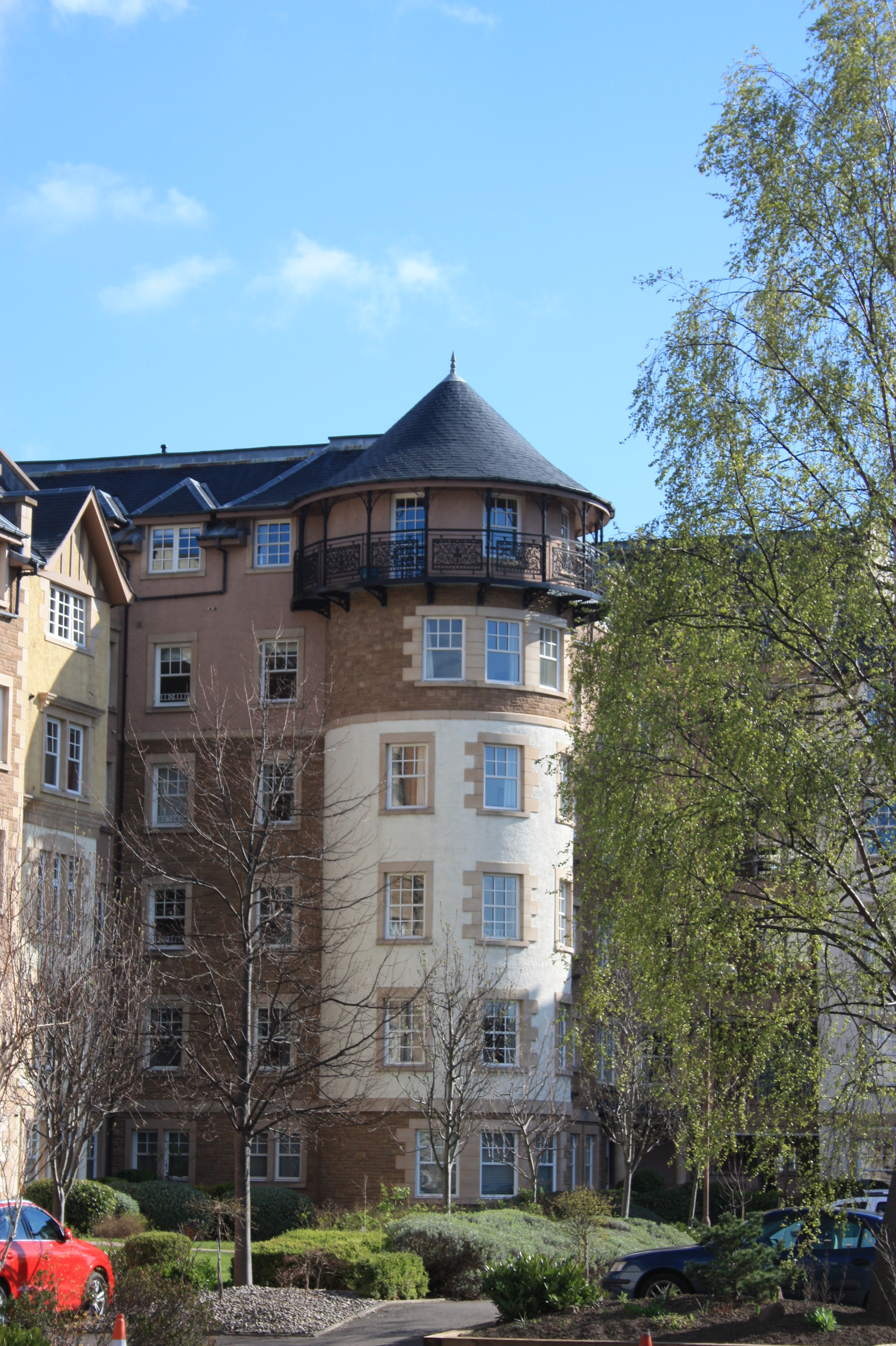
New Cut Rigg, Edinburgh

Victoria Park is a district in north Edinburgh south of Newhaven and lying between Trinity and Leith. The area was given Conservation Area status in March 1998.

== History ==
The park itself was not created until the early 20th century. It was originally smaller, and was mainly based on the former grounds of Bonnington Park House (built in 1789), a still extant villa, now in the north-east corner of the park. A statue of King Edward VII by John Stevenson Rhind dominates the entrance (off Newhaven Road).

Critically, a deep railway cut used to bound the western side of the park. This came in from the south then split in two just before Trinity Academy, linking to the main east west line into Leith Docks. Not until this line was closed (as part of the Beeching cuts) and the cutting infilled, was it possible to increase the park to its current width.

The land west of the railway line was originally proposed as an extension to the Craighall estate but this never came to fruition.

== Surrounding housing ==
The park is bounded by villas on the Craighall estate to the west and by the flat-roofed terraces of the "Dudleys" to the east.

To the north the area is dominated by Trinity Academy and its eastern extensions, built over a large section which was originally parkland.

An interesting finger of houses on Craighall Bank curve into the park on the line of the former railway.

Bonnington Park House (aka Victoria Park House) operates as a children's centre and hides amid trees on the north side of the park.

On the south side of the park the former Ainslie Park School annexe by Ebenezer MacRae was demolished around 1995 and replaced by New Cut Rigg, flats designed to echo Ramsay Gardens in the town centre. Victoria Park Neuk lines the southern exit of the park alongside the remnant railway line, connecting to the Water of Leith Walkway.

The south-east corner of the park is bounded by mid-19th-century villas on Ferry Road and Newhaven Road.

== Famous Residents ==
- Christian Salvesen and his son Edward Theodore Salvesen lived in Catherine Bank House on Newhaven Road facing the park (demolished c.1900 to create the Dudley estate)

== Sporting facilities ==
The park contains bowling greens to the south-east, and tennis courts to the south-west.

A putting green which stood to the north-west no longer exists.

The bowling greens were reduced in scale during the Second World War to provide allotments

== Public transport ==
The area is served by the number 7 and 11 buses into the city centre. The former goes via Leith.
