= Harold Salvesen =

British businessman

Captain Harold Keith Salvesen FRSE DL (30 July 1897 – 1 February 1970) was a British businessman of Norwegian descent, who taught economics at the University of Oxford before becoming a partner in the family whaling and shipping firm Christian Salvesen.

== Life ==
Harold was the son of Theodore Salvesen, who had expanded the family shipping business into whaling in the late nineteenth century. His mother was Annie Forbes Burnet, one of the earliest women to graduate from the University of London and sister of the academic John Burnet. The family lived at 16 Inverleith Place in north Edinburgh. They also owned a country estate at Culrain in northern Scotland. His grandfather Christian Salvesen had founded the family firm.

From 1903 Harold was educated at Edinburgh Academy. He left in 1914 at the outbreak of the First World War to undergo officer training at the Royal Military College, Sandhurst, where he was a prize cadet.

By 1910, the family firm had become the world's leading whaling firm, thanks to a major boom in Antarctic whaling.

On 12 May 1915 he was commissioned as a Second Lieutenant in the Indian Army, and appointed to serve with the 42nd Deoli Regiment in November. During the First World War, he served in the Middle East, Siberia, and Persia. He was twice Mentioned in Dispatches. He was promoted to Lieutenant in 1917 (backdated to May 1916), and retired from the Army as a Captain in 1923. He continued to use the rank throughout his civilian career, finding it useful in conveying authority in a shipping business.

After the war, Salvesen studied politics, philosophy and economics at University College, Oxford, and in 1923 was appointed a Fellow of New College to teach economics. In his four years there, he taught a number of undergraduates who would become prominent Labour politicians, including Hugh Gaitskell, Frank Pakenham, and Richard Crossman, a fact of which he was greatly proud. Salvesen himself was broadly leftwing, declaring himself to be a Labour voter, but was generally distrustful of government and strongly opposed to nationalisation, His nephew, Gerald Elliot, recorded "a faith in entrepreneurial capitalism [and] sympathies for social welfare", and suggested that his dislike of the Conservative government was at least in part a reaction to Conservative politicians who he saw as pompous and imperialist. While at Oxford, he took up a one-year fellowship to study at Harvard University in the United States.

In 1934 he was elected a Fellow of the Royal Society of Edinburgh. His proposers were James Young Simpson, Ralph Allen Sampson, James Hartley Ashworth and his uncle Edward Theodore Salvesen.

In the Second World War he was Joint Manager for the Whaling Branch Oils and Fat Division of the Ministry of Food. After the war in 1945 he became Chairman of the family firm Christian Salvesen.

In later life he lived at Inveralmond House near Cramond in north-west Edinburgh

He retired in 1967 and died on 1 February 1970.

== Family ==
In 1933 he married Marion Eleanora (Mora) Cameron (b.1907) daughter of Admiral John Ewen Cameron and niece of General Archibald Rice Cameron.

Their eldest daughter was the gardener Kirsteen (Kirsty) Marion Forbes Salvesen, later Kirsty Maxwell-Stuart.

== Whaling ==
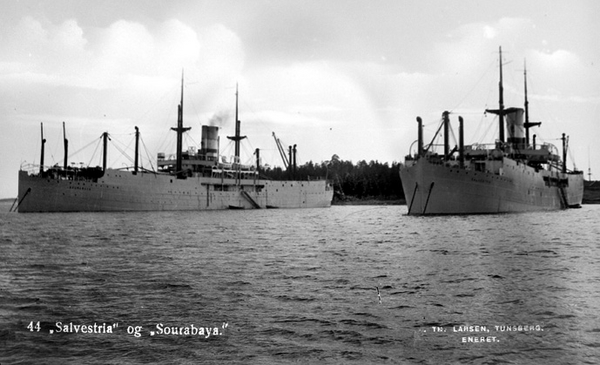
Factory ships Salvestria and Sourabaya at anchor at Jarlsø in Norway, c. 1930

In 1928 Salvesen left Oxford to enter the family business, alongside his brothers Noel and Norman and his cousin Iver. The work was divided among the brothers, working as partners, with Norman responsible for chartering and agency work and Iver handling merchant shipping. Noel, with his father Theodore, headed the whaling division, which Harold joined. After learning Norwegian – the universal language among the whalers – he spent the summers of 1928/29 and 1929/30 in the Antarctic, the first senior manager to actually visit the Southern Ocean whaling fleet, and came back arguing strongly for more investment and more modern practices. He oversaw the conversion of two factory ships for pelagic whaling, Salvestria and Sourabaya, and brought a new zeal and efficiency to the operations at South Georgia and at sea. The boom in Antarctic whaling came to an abrupt halt in 1930/31, with the price of oil dropping by half, and over the following years Salvesen was a leading player in the negotiations to establish an agreed catch quota among the whaling firms. His major achievement was to set the quota in terms of whales killed rather than oil produced, encouraging a less wasteful approach to whaling.

As Harold grew more experienced with the business, he took over the operational aspects of running the fleet while Noel concentrated on selling the oil. During the 1930s he reorganised the staffing of the Salvesen fleet to include more British seamen – it had previously been 95% Norwegian – resulting in repeated clashes with the Norwegian seamen's unions, but a growing closeness with the British National Union of Seamen. On the outbreak of the Second World War the Salvesen fleet headed south for the Antarctic summer, returning in 1940 to find that their Norwegian home ports were now occupied by Germany. The following season, after three Norwegian factory ships were captured by the commerce raider Pinguin the government ordered the suspension of all whaling for the duration of the war, despite Salvensen's protests that whale oil was a valuable food source. The entire British whaling fleet was dispersed, with the factory ships leased to the Ministry of Transport as oil tankers and military transports, and the whalecatchers leased to serve as patrol ships and minesweepers. Over the following years Salvesen worked to shepherd this fleet of ships through the Battle of the Atlantic, with great losses; every Salvesen and Unilever factory ship was sunk, along with two of the large modern Norwegian factory ships.

== Publications ==
- Modern Aspects of Whaling (1932)
