= Norbert Dentressangle =

European transport, logistics and freight forwarding company

Norbert Dentressangle SA
- Company type: Société anonyme
- Industry: Transport, logistics, freight forwarding
- Founded: 1979
- Founder: Norbert Dentressangle
- Defunct: 8 June 2015
- Fate: Purchased by XPO, Inc.
- Headquarters: Lyon, France
- Key people: Hervé Montjotin (CEO); Norbert Dentressangle (chairman)
- Revenue: €4.03 billion (2013)
- Net income: €142 million (2013)

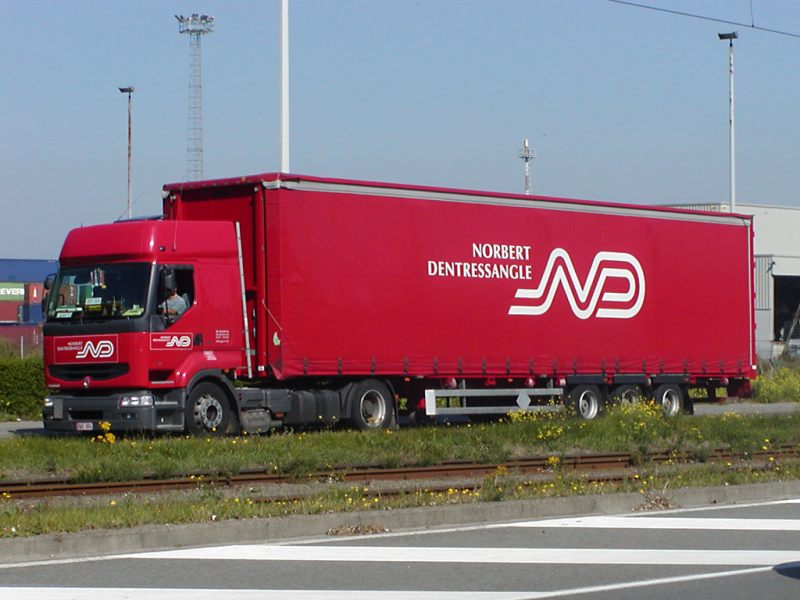
A Norbert Dentressangle lorry

Norbert Dentressangle (French pronunciation: [nɔʁbɛʁ dɑ̃tʁɛsɑ̃ɡl]) was a major European transport, logistics and freight forwarder. It was founded in 1979, initially concentrating on cross channel transport between France and the United Kingdom.

In December 2007, Norbert Dentressangle doubled its size, and significantly strengthened its position in Europe, with the acquisition of Christian Salvesen, and in March 2011, it bought the British company TDG. The company reported proforma revenues of €3.8 billion for 2012.

In July 2014, Norbert Dentressangle announced that it would be acquiring Jacobson Companies, a United States-based third-party logistics provider, for $750 million. Norbert Dentressangle operated from 500 sites in 20 European countries, and at one time employed 33,000 people.

On 28 April 2015, the group XPO, Inc. announced a $3.56 billion (3.24 billion euros) deal to acquire Norbert Dentressangle, including acquired debt. The acquisition was completed on 8 June 2015, and the Dentressangle brand was phased out from June 2015.
