= Henry Adolph Salvesen =

Henry Adolph Salvesen FRSE DL JP (5 June 1860–13 May 1924) was a 19th-century Scottish mechanical engineer and naval architect of Norwegian descent.

== Life ==
He was born at Weedingshall in Polmont near Falkirk on 5 June 1860 one of at least nine children of Anna Nathalia and Johannis Theodore Salvesen who had come to Scotland from Norway in 1846.

He was educated at Blairlodge School in Polmont the Stirling Collegiate School. He then studied engineering at the University of Edinburgh training as a naval architect. He appears to have detached himself wholly from the family firm of Christian Salvesen but was perhaps involved in ship design for them. From 1882 he joined his father's firm of J T Salvesen & Co, shipowners, timber importers and coal exporters, based in Grangemouth. He also operated for many years from Greenock.

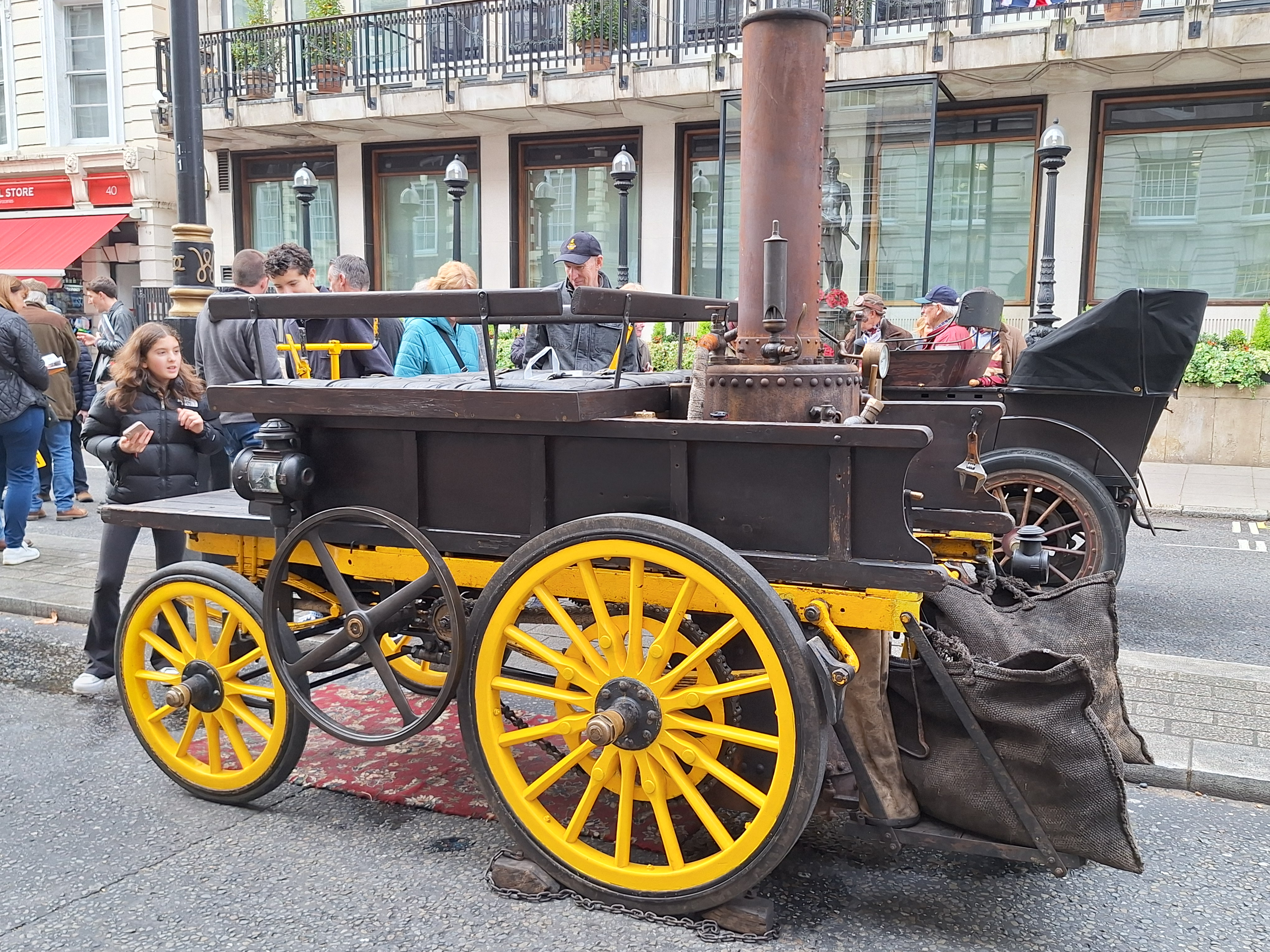
Salvesen steam cart at the St James Motoring Spectacle in London, 2024

He was a keen car enthusiast, owning a 6 hp Daimler, a 10 hp steam-car of his own design, and a 12 hp Benz.

In 1923 (aged 63) he was elected a Fellow of the Royal Society of Edinburgh. His proposers were Theodore Salvesen, William Archer Tait, Sir Edmund Taylor Whittaker and Sir Robert Blyth Greig.

He died at Lathallan House near Falkirk on 13 May 1924. The company of J T Salvesen & Co was dissolved following his death.

== Family ==
His uncle was Christian Salvesen.

He was cousin to Edward Theodore Salvesen and Theodore Emile Salvesen.

He married Dagmar Marie Becker around 1880, and they had at least seven children, including Meta Natalie Salvesen (1883-1959).
