= Sandefjord Museum =

Museum dedicated to whaling in Norway

Coordinates: 59.131°N 10.227°E

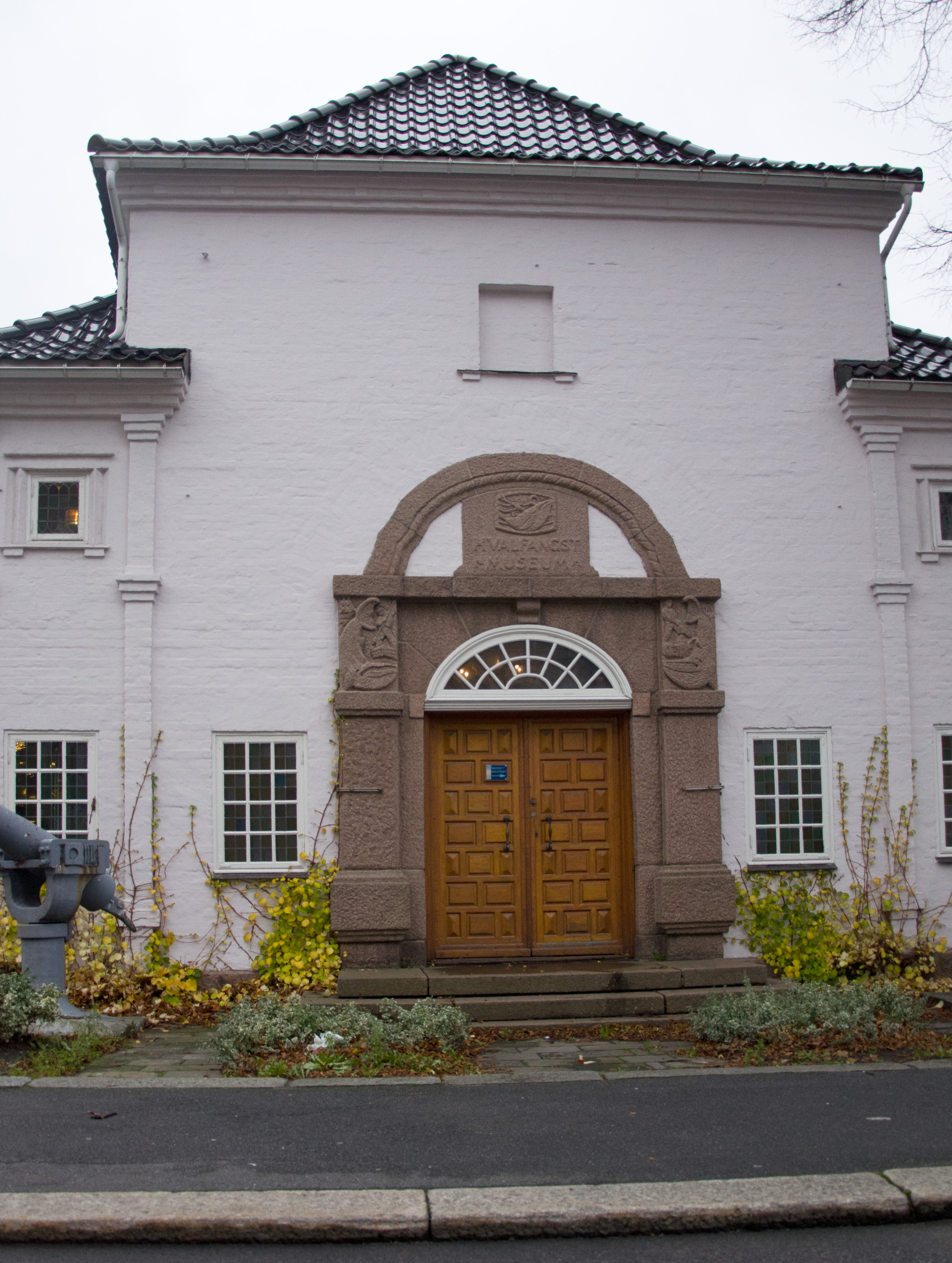
Sandefjord Museum designed 1917 by architect Niels Winge Grimnes

Sandefjordmuseene (Hvalfangstmuseet) is a museum located in Sandefjord, Norway. It is dedicated to the whaling industry and is the only specialized museum on the subject of whales and whaling in Europe. Since 2009, the museum has been associated with the Vestfold Museum (Vestfoldmuseene). It is one of the largest whaling museums in the world, and Europe's only museum dedicated to the whaling industry.

Sandefjord Whaling Museum houses a full-size recreation of a 21-meter Blue whale, which hangs from the ceiling in one of its galleries. Southern Actor is based on Museum's Wharf and is a part of the museum. It is the only whale-catcher from the Modern Whaling Epoch still in its original working order.

The museum was visited by over one million people from its opening until 1994.

== History ==
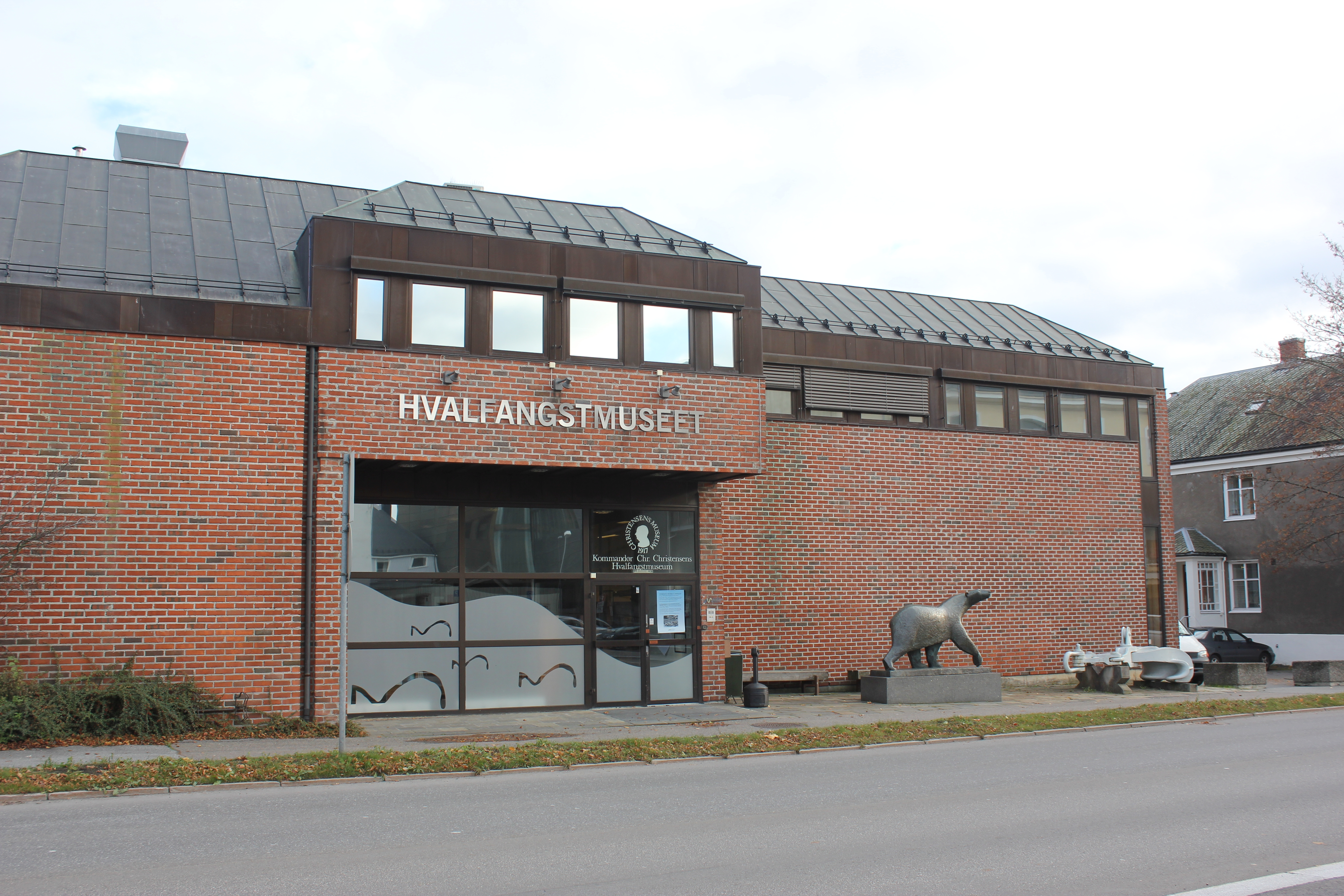
A bronze polar bear made by sculptor Skule Waksvik is by the main entrance.

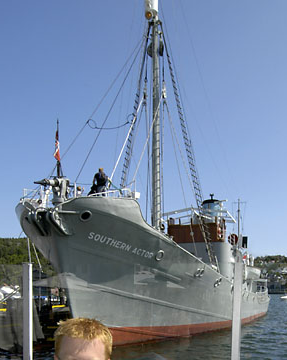
Southern Actor built 1950 for Chr. Salvesen & Co. Leith, Scotland

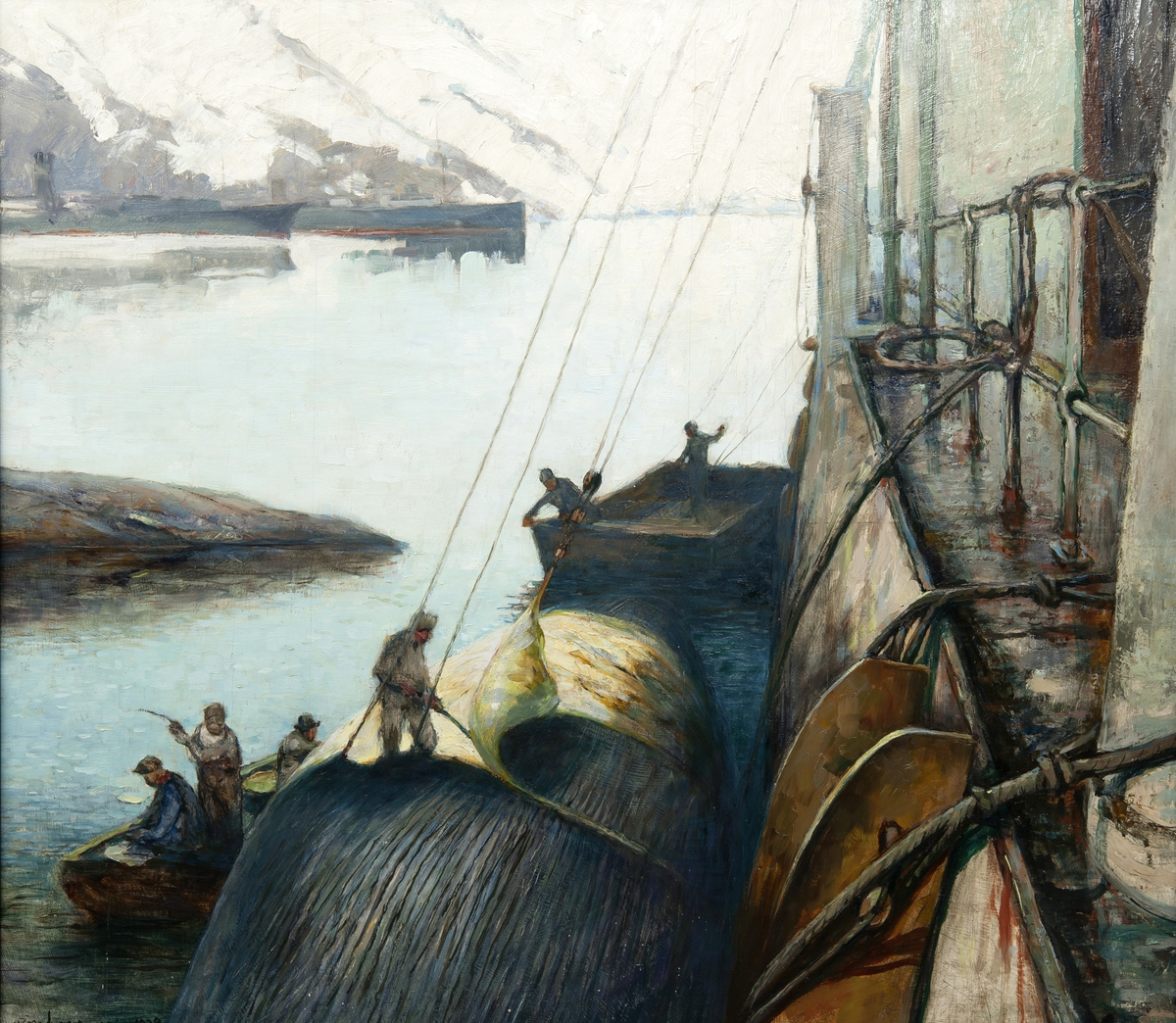
Flensing av blåhval by Carl Dørnberger ca. 1927

The Whaling Museum in Sandefjord (Hvalfangstmuseet i Sandefjord) was inaugurated as a donation from Consul Lars Christensen, the son of Norwegian shipyard and ship owner, Christen Christensen. Its full name is "Commander Christen Christensen's Whaling Museum". The building was designed by architect Niels Winge Grimnes (1885-1922).

When it opened in 1917 the museum building was one of the first original museum buildings in Norway. Lars Christensen had two main goals when opening the museum; to inform the public about the Antarctic and its fauna and animal life, as it was a relatively unknown continent at the time, and to tell the story of whaling as an industry.

The museum was visited by H.M. King Haakon VII on his first official visit to Sandefjord on June 23, 1920.

Since its opening, the museum has experienced some major changes including an expansion in 1981. Today, the Whaling Museum's aim is to be a central institution in the presentation of a wide range of material connected to the history of whaling as well as the ecology and management of whales and their habitat. The museum's photo collection consists of 150,000 photographs around 30,000 of which are related to whaling. The museum is host to a host of international conferences related to marine life and to whales.

Exhibits include Southern Actor, a whale catcher built 1950 for Chr. Salvesen & Co. of Leith, Scotland. Today the restored vessel is a museum ship open to the public. The former whale catcher is both a living museum and a passenger ship.

== Gallery ==
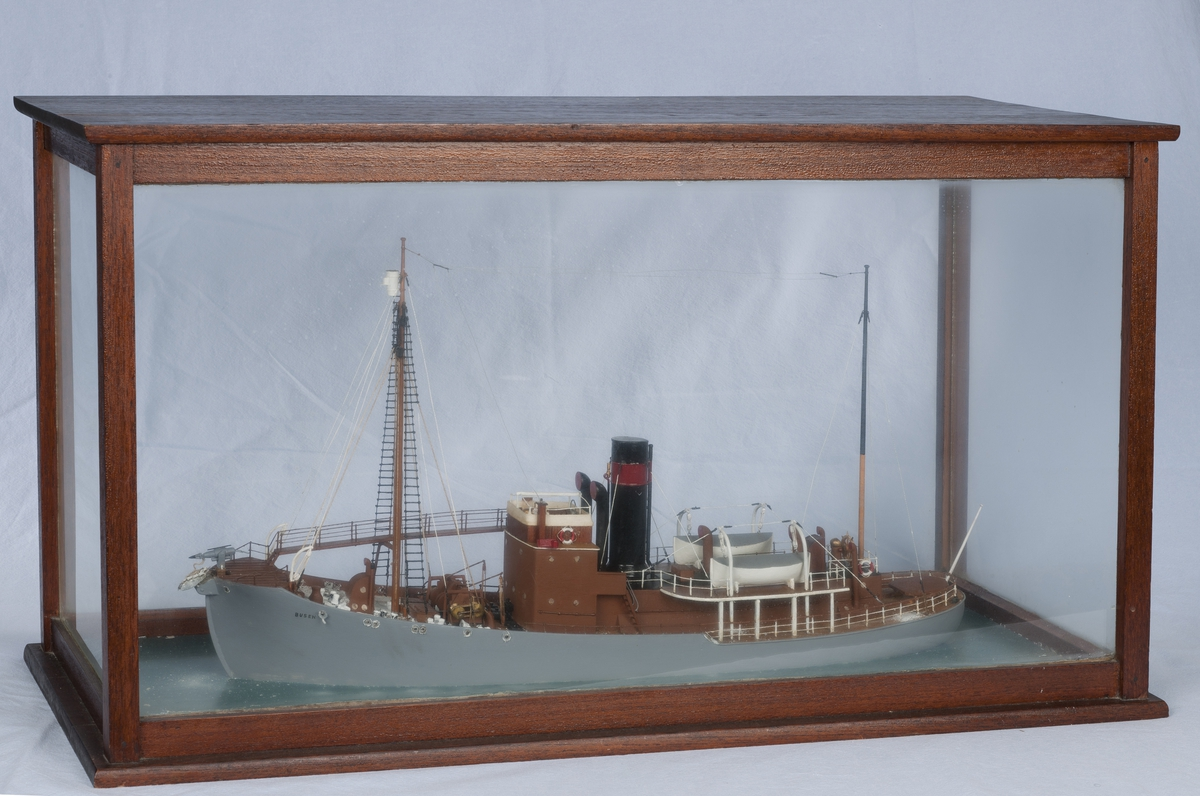
Model: Busen 2

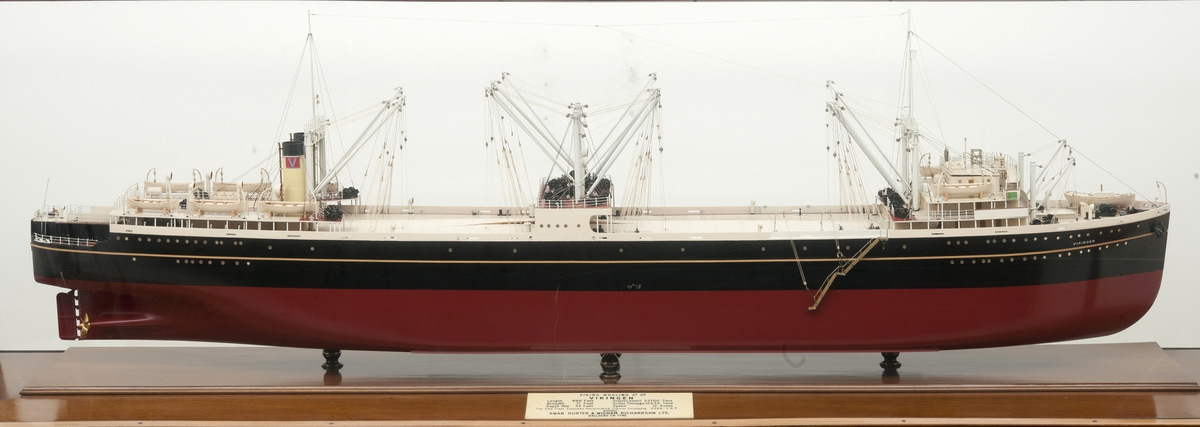
Model: Vikingen

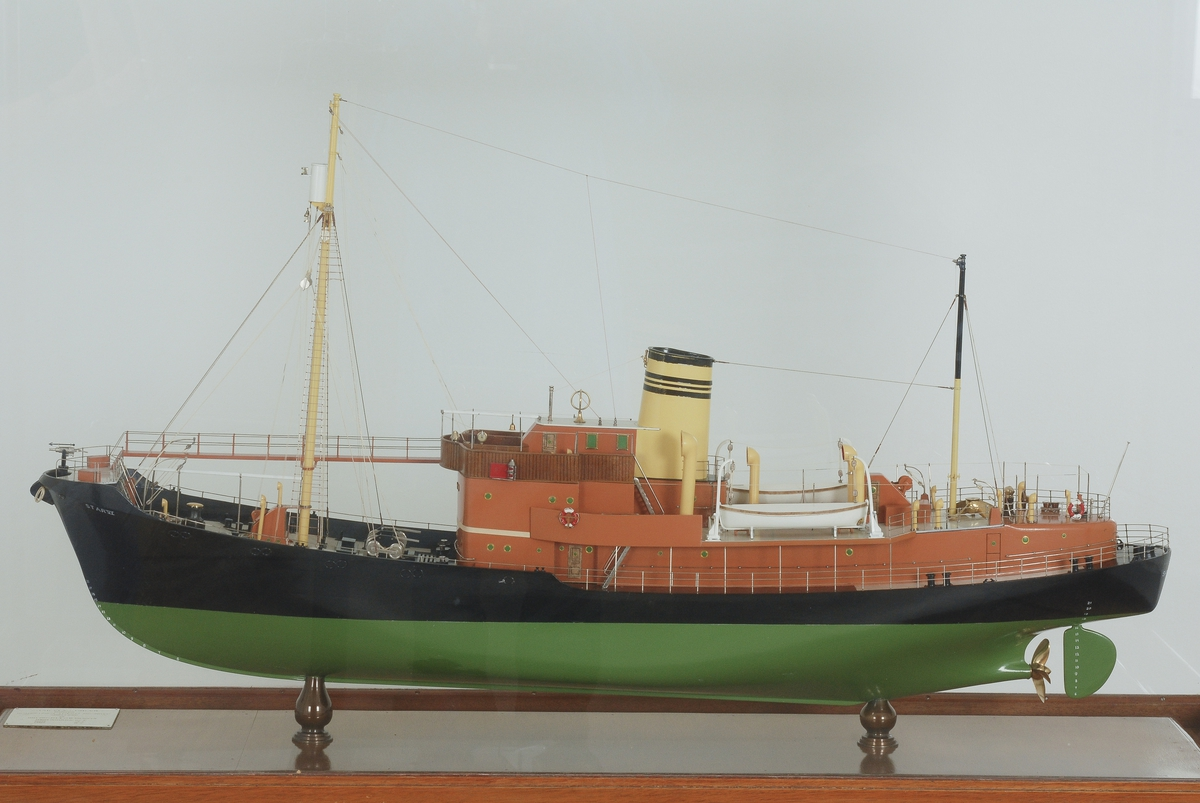
Model: Star VI+VII whale catcher

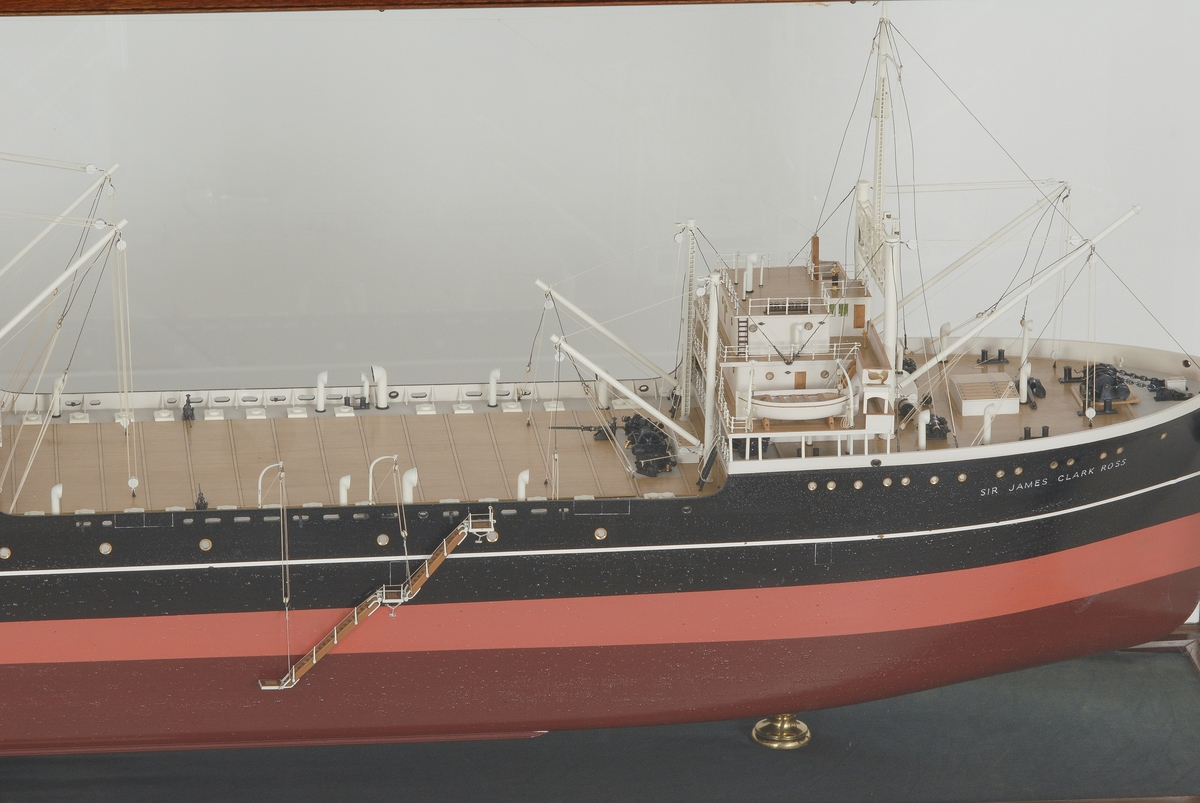
Model: Sir James Clark Ross HS

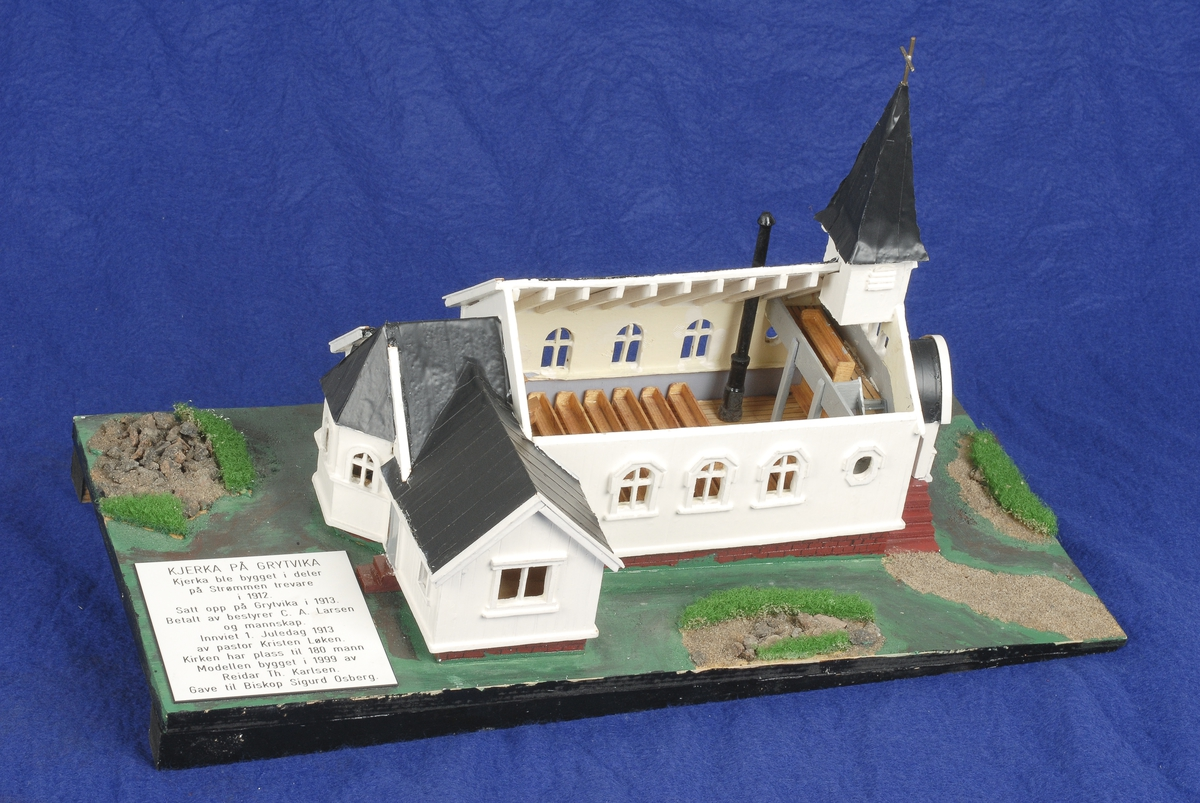
Model: Grytviken Church built by Reidar Th. Karlsen in 1999

== See also ==
- Framnæs Mekaniske Værksted

== Other sources ==
- Wexelsen, Einar (1993) Vel blåst! Kommandør Chr. Christensens Hvalfangstmuseum 75 år (Sandefjord: Hvalfangstmuseets publikasjon nr. 28)
