= John Trayner, Lord Trayner =

Scottish lawyer

The Honourable Lord Trayner
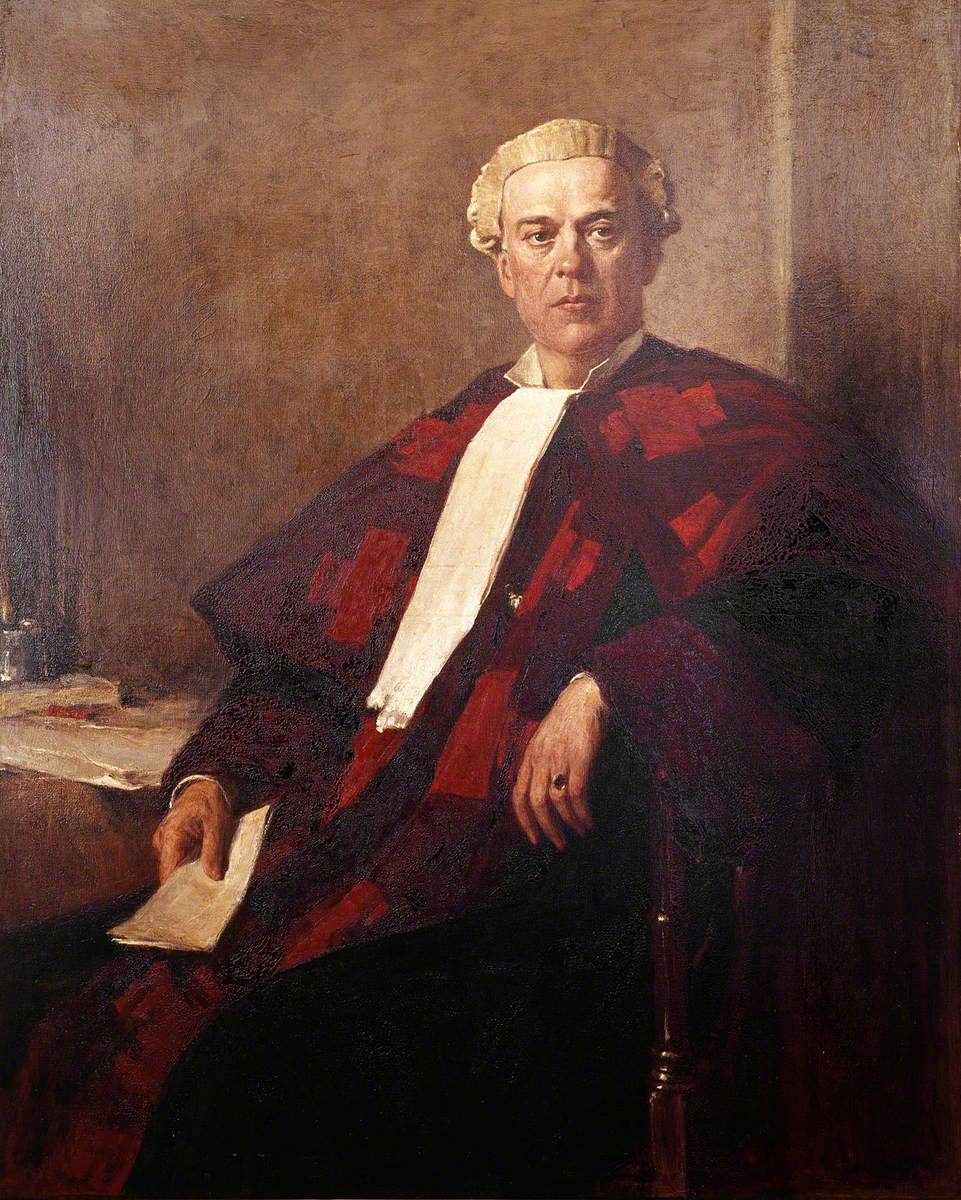
- Painting of Lord Trayner by George Reid, circa 1893

Senator of the College of Justice in Scotland
- In office 1885–1904

John Trayner, Lord Trayner (19 April 1834 – 3 February 1929) was a Scottish lawyer who rose to be a Senator of the College of Justice.

== Life ==
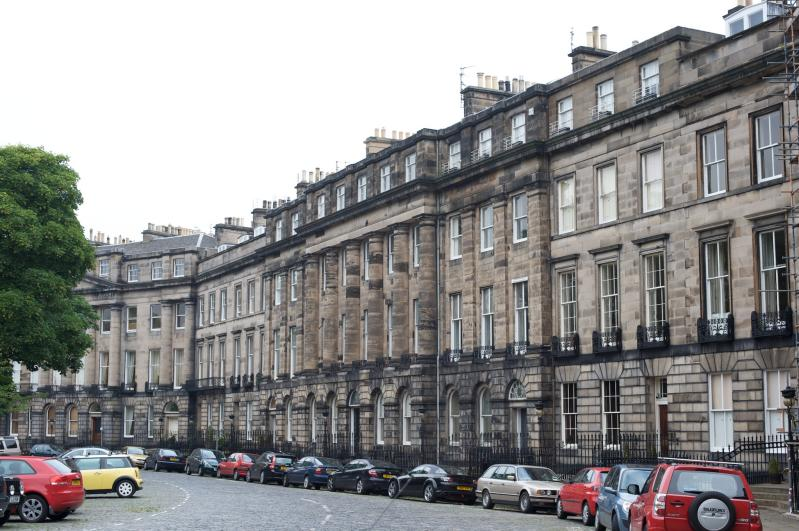
Moray Place, Edinburgh

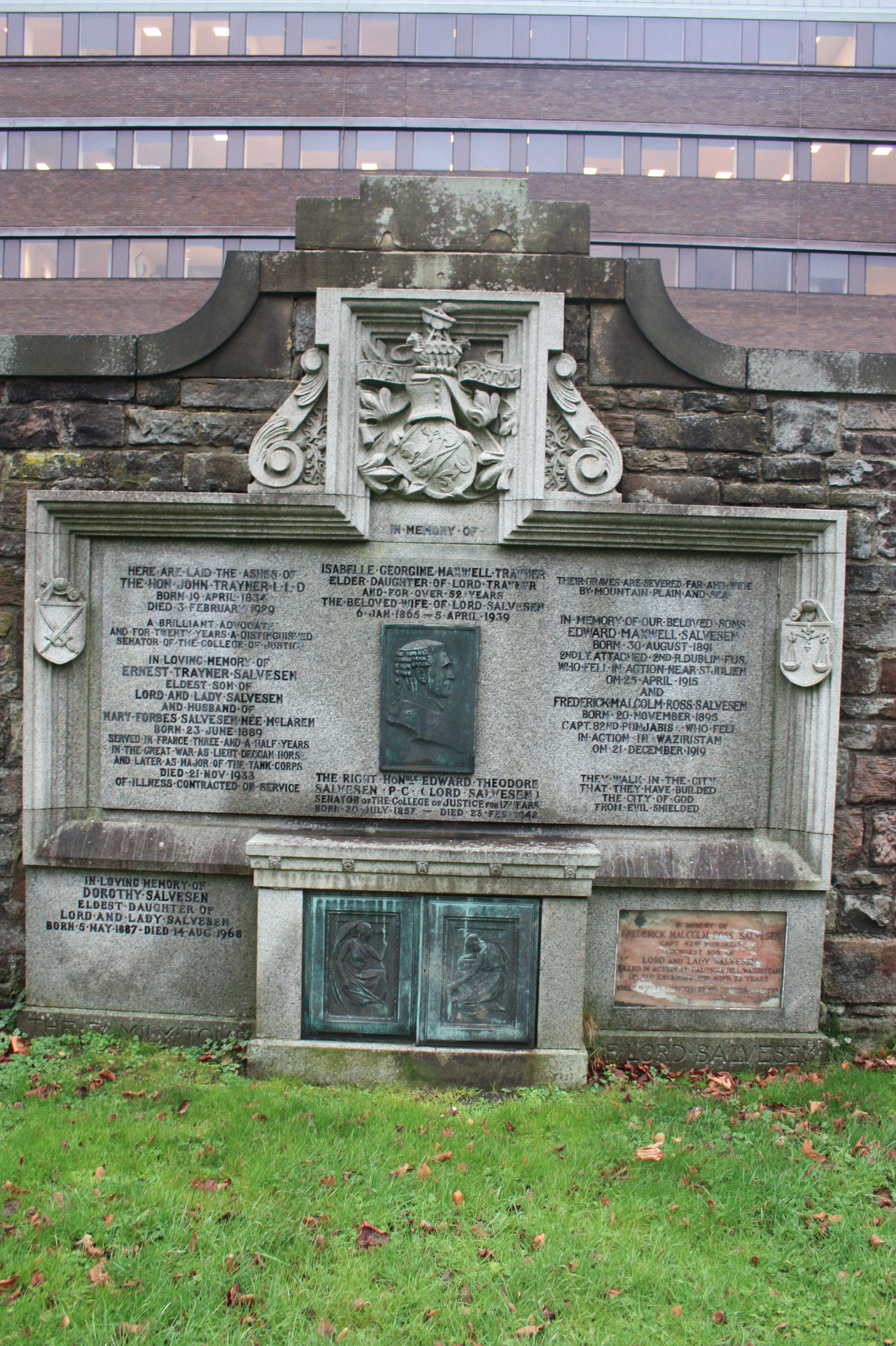
The Salvesen-Trayner monument, Dean Cemetery, Edinburgh

He was born in Glasgow on 19 April 1834, the son of Agnes (1796–1874) and Hugh Trayner (1798–1861). He studied law first at the University of Glasgow and then at University of Edinburgh

In February 1885, he was elected a Senator of the College of Justice. In 1886, he was awarded an honorary doctorate (LLD) by the University of Glasgow. At this time he was living at 27 Moray Place in Edinburgh's West End.

In the 1901, census he was living at The Grange in North Berwick and was being visited by his friend and colleague Sir John Cheyne and his wife Lady Cheyne.

He died at Dean House in Edinburgh on 3 February 1929 and is buried in Dean Cemetery. He shares the grave of his son-in-law, Edward Theodore Salvesen, in the new Lords Row against the north wall of the 20th century extension to the cemetery, backing onto Queensferry Road. The memorial was designed by Sir Robert Lorimer.

== Family ==
He was married to Frances Elizabeth Wyld (1839–1908), daughter of Robert Stodart Wyld WS.

Their daughter Isabell Georgine Maxwell Trayner (1865–1939) married Edward Theodore Salvesen, Lord Salvesen. Their son Charles Hugh Maxwell Trayner (1867–1908) travelled widely and married Emmeline Tornquist of Guatemala and died in Spain. Their son Robert (Bertie) Wyld Maxwell Trayner (1870–1958) married Adelaide Wilhelmina Roddy in San Francisco, and their daughter Frances Agnes Mary Camille Trayner (1878–1952) did not marry.

== Publications ==
- Latin Phrases and Maxims (1861)

== Artistic recognition ==
His portrait by George Reid RSA is held by the University of Dundee.
