= Southern Actor =

Ship built in 1950

Coordinates: 59.126612°N 10.229596°E

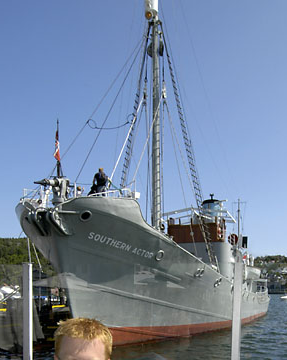
- Southern Actor at Sandefjord harbour

History

United Kingdom
- Name: Southern Actor
- Owner: Christian Salvesen Ltd
- Builder: Smiths Dock
- Yard number: 1202
- Launched: 1950
- Fate: Laid up in Melsomvik, Norway 1962

History

United Kingdom
- Name: Southern Actor
- Owner: Christian Salvesen Ltd
- Builder: Smiths Dock
- Launched: 1950
- Fate: Sold to E.Aarset & Co 1964

History

Norway
- Name: Polarbris 8
- Owner: E. Aarseth & Co, Ålesund
- Builder: Smiths Dock
- Launched: 1950
- Fate: Sold to Industria Ballenera SA, Vigo 1975
- Notes: Whaling off Skjelnan hvalstasjon, Troms

History

Spain
- Name: IBSA I (or IBSA Uno?)
- Owner: Industria Ballenera SA, Vigo
- Builder: Smiths Dock
- Launched: 1950
- Fate: Sunk by Sea Shepherd April 1981
- Notes: Whaling off Vigo

History

Spain
- Name: Itaxa III
- Owner: Industria Ballenera SA, Vigo
- Builder: Smiths Dock
- Launched: 1950
- Fate: Sold to Sandefjord Museum
- Notes: Almost scrapped in Cee, Spain, but towed to Sandefjord under the temporary name Pingvin,

Norway
- Name: Southern Actor
- Owner: Sandefjord Museum
- Acquired: 1989
- Identification: IMO number: 5335228; MMSI number: 257015900; Callsign: LGYC
- Fate: Museum Ship

General characteristics
- Type: Whaler
- Tonnage: 439 GRT
- Length: 158 ft 9 1/2 in (48.400 m) (LOA)
- Beam: 27 ft 6 in (8.38 m)
- Draft: 15 ft 6 in (4.72 m)
- Installed power: Triple expansion steam engine

Southern Actor is a former whale catcher, currently a museum ship based in Sandefjord, Norway and owned by Sandefjord Museum. It is the only whale catcher from the Modern Whaling Epoch still to be in its original working order. Over 100,000 hours have been spent on restoring the vessel.

Southern Actor is in working order and can be chartered for excursions.
