= Salveson =

Salveson is a surname. Notable people with the surname include:

- Jack Salveson (1914–1974), American baseball player
- Paul Salveson (born 20th century), English politician, activist and author

== See also ==
- Salvesen
