= Violette Lecoq =

FRENCH NURSE , ILLUSTRATOR AND RESISTANCE MEMBER

- Born: 1912
- Died: 2003 (aged 90–91); Paris
- Occupations: Nurse, illustrator
- Known for: her drawings from the Ravensbrück concentration camp, which were also used as evidence at the Hamburg Ravensbrück trials in 1946.
- Awards: Croix de Guerre

Violette Lecoq (1912 – 2003) was a French nurse, illustrator, and a resistance member during World War II. She is known for her drawings from the Ravensbrück concentration camp, which were also used as evidence at the first Ravensbrück Trials in 1946.

== World War II ==
At the outbreak of World War II Lecoq worked as a nurse with the Red Cross. She was also affiliated with the French resistance movement. She was arrested in 1942 and held one year in isolation, and then brought to the Ravensbrück concentration camp in 1943, as a Nacht und Nebel prisoner. She worked as a nurse at block ten, the block for tuberculous and mentally ill. From this hut she witnessed the murder of women who were not longer capable of working. Lecoq managed to organize pencil and paper, and made several illustrations from the life in the camp, with the intention of publishing the drawings some day.

She was evacuated with the Swedish Red Cross in April 1945. In 1946, she was a witness at the Ravensbrück Trials in Hamburg, along with Odette Sansom, Irène Ottemard, Jaqueline Hereil, Helene Dziedziecka, Neeltje Epker and others. Her drawings were used as evidence at the trials.

In 1948 she published Ravensbrück, 36 dessins à la plume, a collection of her drawings from the Ravensbrück camp. The drawings are pencil sketches from the "everyday life" in the camp. Examples are the series "-Welcome...", and "Deux heures après", showing individual women entering the camp, and the transition two hours later. The drawing "La loi du plus fort..." (in English: The law of the strongest) shows the humiliation of the prisoners by brutality from the staff.

Several of her illustrations had been included in Sylvia Salvesen's book Tilgi – men glem ikke from 1947. Some of the illustrations were later included in Kristian Ottosen's book on Ravensbrück from 1991.

Lecoq was awarded the French Resistance medal, and the French Croix de guerre. She died in Paris in 2003.

== Selected works ==
- Ravensbrück, 36 dessins à la plume (1948)
