= Theodore Salvesen =

Scottish soldier and businessman

Colonel Theodore Emile Salvesen of Culrain (aka Ted Salvesen) TD JP FSA Scot FRSE FRSA (10 March 1863–14 January 1942) was a 19th-century Scottish soldier and businessman.

The Theodore Salvesen Memorial Trust caring for training and financial hardship of the Merchant Navy was named in his honour.

== Life ==
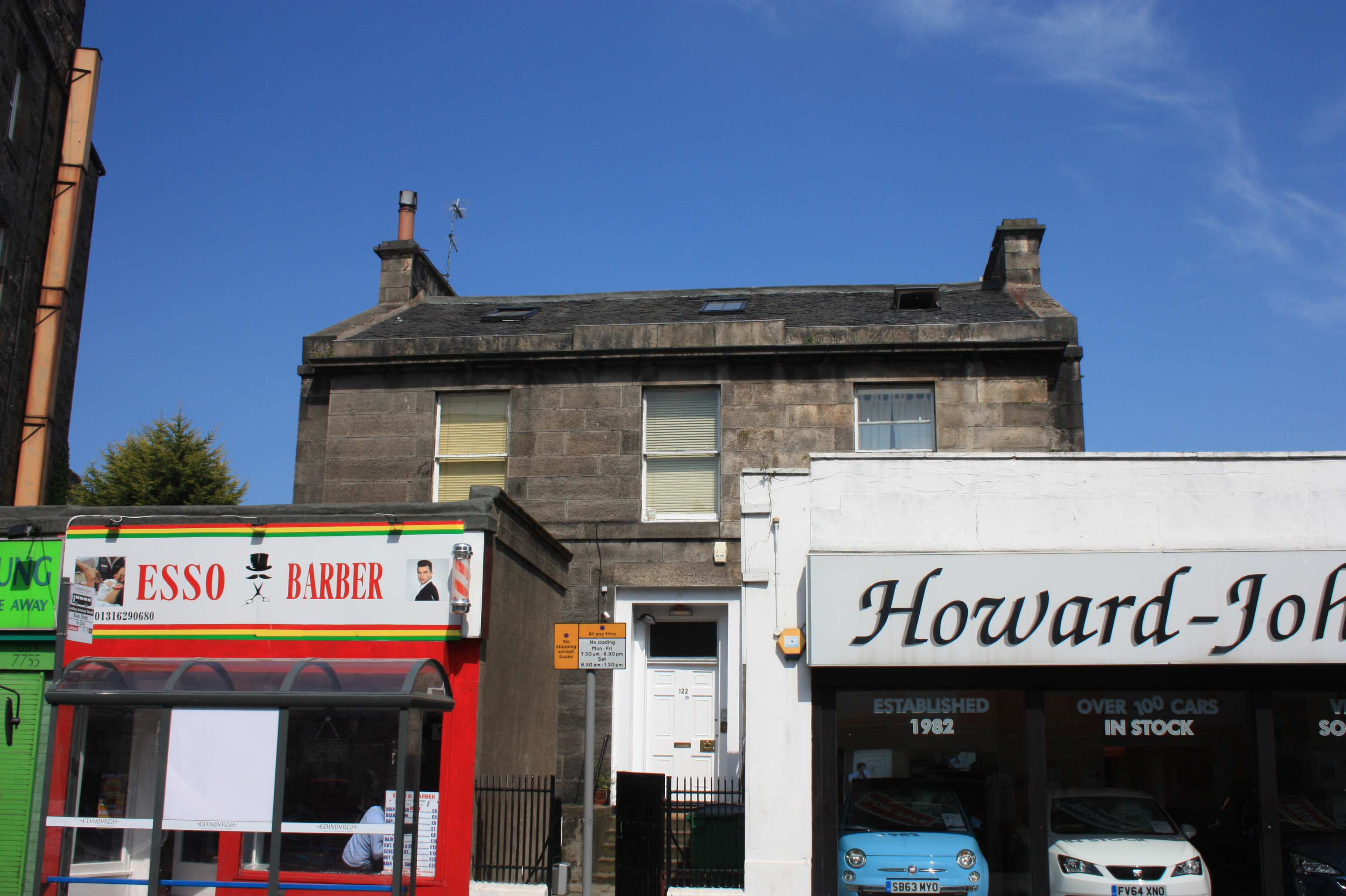
Baynefield House, 122 Ferry Road, Edinburgh

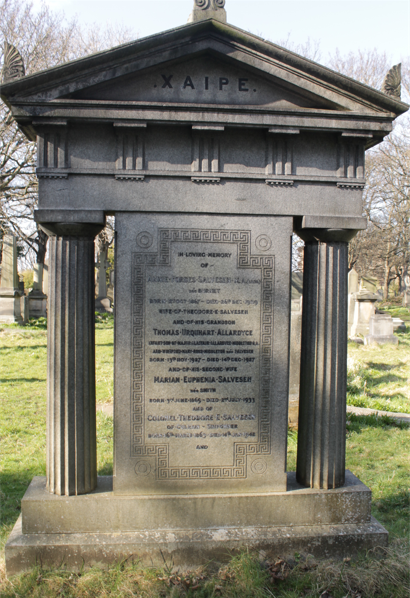
The grave of Theodore Salvesen, Warriston Cemetery

He was born on 10 March 1863 the son of Salve Christian Frederik Salvesen, a Norwegian who came to Scotland in 1851 to join his brother, Johannis Theodore Salvesen, and founded the shipping company, Turnbull and Salvesen becoming Christian Salvesen (in 1872). His mother was Amalie Georgine Salome Andorsen (1828-1901). His elder brother was Edward Theodore Salvesen (Lord Salvesen). At the time of his birth they lived at Baynefield House in Leith north of Edinburgh. The house still exists (slightly obscured) and is known simply as 122 Ferry Road.

Whilst he enjoyed the title "Colonel" his military involvement was limited to the Territorial Army and he was never involved directly in any war.

In 1899, when he took over the family firm from his father, he branched into whaling. He established the whaling colony of Leith Harbour in South Georgia, named after his home.

In 1914 he was elected a Fellow of the Royal Society of Edinburgh. His proposers were James Geikie, James Currie, Sir Thomas Hudson Beare and William Spiers Bruce.

His company held the unfortunate claim to fame of owning the first ship sunk by a U-boat in the First World War: the SS Glitra which was destroyed in the first week of the war.

In 1937 T E Salvesen is listed as the consul for Norway, Finland and France based at 29 Bernard Street.

He died on 14 January 1942 aged 78, apparently while still serving in the Royal Engineers, during the Second World War, and was cremated at Warriston Crematorium, Edinburgh. His ashes are buried with his wife in Warriston Cemetery.

== Family ==
He was married to first Annie Forbes Burnet (1867-1909), sister of John Burnet, then Marian Euphemia Smith (1869-1933).

He was father to Captain Harold Salvesen.
