= TDG Limited =

- Type: Private
- Industry: Supply chain management Logistics
- Founded: 1922
- Defunct: March 2011
- Headquarters: London, England, United Kingdom
- Key people: Mike Branigan, CEO
- Revenue: £662.1 million (2009)
- Number of employees: 6,500 (2009)
- Parent: Norbert Dentressangle then XPO, Inc.
- Website: xpo.com

TDG Limited was a goods transportation, distribution, warehousing and supply chain management company based in England with offices also in Ireland, Belgium, the Netherlands, Spain, Hungary and Germany.

== History ==
The company was formed in 1922 as The General Lighterage Co Ltd. It was first listed on the London Stock Exchange in 1950, and changed its name to Transport Development Group in 1957. It started to expand into Europe in 1963, and acquired Van Straaten in the Netherlands in August 1999. The name changed to TDG plc in 2000.

The company acquired IWT Holdings, an Irish logistics business, in August 2001, Mond & Cie, a Belgian logistics business, in March 2006 and Doman S.A., a Spanish logistics business, in February 2007. In July 2008, TDG was taken private by the Laxey Investment Trust (later renamed Douglas Bay Capital) through Laxey Logistics and was subsequently removed from London Stock Exchange.

On 26 November 2010, Norbert Dentressangle reached an agreement to buy Laxey Logistics Ltd (which owns 100% of TDG Ltd and all its subsidiaries) from Douglas Bay Capital. The transaction was completed on 29 March 2011, following approval from the European Commission. TDG Limited became a subsidiary of XPO, Inc. after Norbert Dentressangle was acquired by XPO, Inc. in 2015.

== Activities ==
The company is organised into four sectors; Transport and Distribution, Warehousing and Storage, International Services and Support Services and offers the following services:

- Logistics warehousing and shared user warehousing
- Transport logistics, hazardous goods transport, bulk and packed chemical transport
- Distribution logistics, 3PL, High-Cube transport network
- Flexible end to end supply chain management
- Bulk chemical storage and hazardous goods warehousing
- Temperature controlled warehousing and distribution
- International freight forwarding by air, sea or road
- 4PL services that maximise efficiency and reduce costs
- Customs brokerage services
- Value added services including: tank cleaning, drumming, blending, mixing, contract packing and IBC cleaning and management.
