= John Burnet (classicist) =

Scottish classicist (1863–1928)

1917 portrait by Walter Stoneman

John Burnet, FBA (/bərˈnɛt/; 9 December 1863 – 26 May 1928) was a Scottish classicist. He was born in Edinburgh and died in St Andrews.

== Life ==
He was born in Edinburgh the son of John Burnet, advocate, and his wife Jessie, daughter of Dr James Cleghorn Kay RN. The family lived at 8 Pitt Street in Edinburgh's New Town (later renamed Dublin Street).

Burnet was educated at the Royal High School, Edinburgh, then University of Edinburgh, before winning a scholarship to Balliol College, Oxford, where he obtained first-class honours in Classical Moderations (Greek and Latin) in 1885 and in Literae Humaniores ('Greats', a combination of philosophy and ancient history) in 1887. In the course of his undergraduate academic career at Oxford he won the Taylorian Scholarship in French (1885) and came second for the Boden Sanskrit Scholarship (1884).

After taking his degree in 1887 Burnet became an assistant to Lewis Campbell at the University of St. Andrews. He was a master at Harrow School in 1888. From 1890 to 1915, he was a Fellow at Merton College, Oxford; and from 1892 to 1926 a professor of Greek at St Andrews. For a term prior to his St Andrews professorship, he served as Interim Professor of Humanity (Latin) at the University of Edinburgh. He became a Fellow of the British Academy in 1916. In 1909, Burnet was offered, but did not accept, the Chair of Greek at Harvard University. He was Sather Professor in Classical Literature, California, 1925.

He died in St Andrews and is buried in the Western Cemetery in St Andrews.

== Family ==
In 1894, he married Mary Farmer, the daughter of John Farmer, who wrote the Preface for a collection of essays published after his death, Essays and Addresses.

His sister Annie Forbes Burnet married Theodore Salvesen.

== Works ==
Burnet is best known for his work on Plato. His interest in philosophy and in Plato in particular seems to have begun during his service as assistant to Lewis Campbell at St. Andrews. Burnet was known for defending novel interpretations of Plato and Socrates, particularly the view that the depiction of Socrates in all of Plato's dialogues is historically accurate, and that the philosophical views peculiar to Plato himself are to be found only in the so-called late dialogues. Burnet also maintained that Socrates was closely connected to the early Greek philosophical tradition, now generally known as Pre-Socratic philosophy; Burnet believed that Socrates had been in his youth the disciple of Archelaus, a member of the Anaxagorean tradition (Burnet 1924, vi).

Burnet's philological work on Plato is still widely read, and his editions have been considered authoritative for 100 years, as the 5-volume Oxford Classical Texts critical edition of Plato works and spuria (1900–1907). His commentaries on Plato's Euthyphro, Apology, and Crito and on the Phaedo also remain widely used and respected by scholars. Myles Burnyeat, for example, calls Burnet's Plato: Euthyphro, Apology of Socrates, Crito "the still unsurpassed edition". S.R. Slings, editor of the new 2003 Oxford Classical Texts edition of Plato's Republic, described Burnet as "a superb editor, with a feeling for Platonic Greek that is unlikely to be ever surpassed."

=== Early Greek Philosophy ===
Early Greek Philosophy is a book by John Burnet. Four editions were published by A. & C. Black, Ltd. in Great Britain. The first edition was published in April 1892, the second in June 1908, the third in September 1920 and the fourth, posthumously, in 1930.

From the Preface to the Third Edition (unchanged in the fourth edition):

...the main thesis of my book, and the vital point of the argument is my insistence on the derivation of Atomism (which is admittedly materialistic) from Eleaticism, in accordance with the express statements of Aristotle and Theophrastos...

There are many differences between the first and fourth editions. For example, the quotation below comes from section 33: Philosophy as a life. in the first (1892) edition. In the third (1920) and fourth (1930) editions, the section has been moved to section 35, renamed to Philosophy as a way of life. and no longer mentions the Neoplatonists.

== Legacy ==
A University of St Andrews residential hall was named John Burnet Hall in his honour.

== Bibliography ==
=== Major works ===
- Early Greek Philosophy. London and Edinburgh: A. and C. Black, 1892. 2nd edition, 1908. 3rd edition, 1920. 4th edition, 1930.
  - An online text of the 3rd edition (1920) of Early Greek Philosophy
  - re-edited 5th edition, 2015.
  - Early Greek Philosophy (1892, Archive.org)
- Greek Philosophy: Thales to Plato. London, MacMillan, 1914.
  - re-edited 2nd edition, 2010.
- Platonism. Berkeley: University of California Press, 1928.
- Higher Education and the War, 1917.
- Essays and Addresses, 1930, includes a "Memoir" by Godfrey Rathbone Benson.
  - "The Socratic Doctrine of the Soul", 1916. (British Academy's 1916 Philosophical Lecture).
  - "Aristotle", 1924. (British Academy's 1924 Master-Mind Lecture).

=== Editions edited and annotated by Burnet ===
- The Ethics of Aristotle. London: Methuen, 1900. PDF
- Platonis Opera: Recognovit Brevique Adnotatione Critica Instruxit (as Ioannes Burnet). Oxford: Oxford Classical Texts, 1900–1907.
- Plato: Phaedo. Oxford: Clarendon, 1911.
- Plato: Euthyphro, Apology of Socrates, Crito. Oxford: Clarendon, 1924. (A student edition, with commentary.)
