= Sylvia Salvesen =

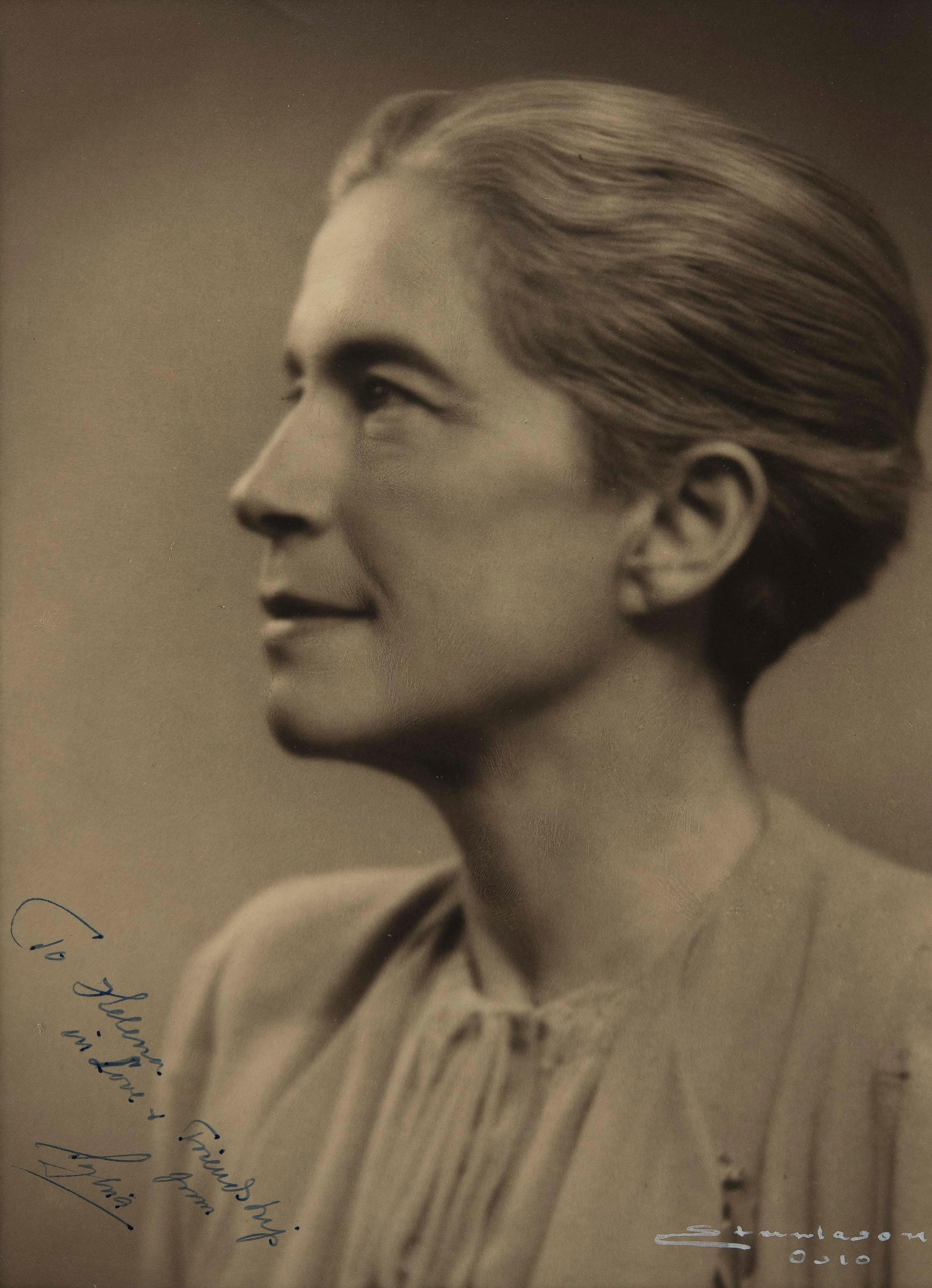
- Salvesen in 1947
- Born: 25 January 1890
- Died: 19 June 1973 (aged 83)
- Spouse: Harald Salvesen
- Awards: King's Medal of Merit in gold (1965)

Sylvia Salvesen (25 January 1890 – 19 June 1973) was a member of the high society in Norway, and a resistance pioneer during World War II. She was arrested and sent to the Ravensbrück concentration camp in Germany. She witnessed at the Hamburg Ravensbrück Trials in 1946, and wrote a memoir book documenting her wartime experiences.

== Biography ==
Sylvia Salvesen was married to medical professor at Rikshospitalet in Oslo, Harald Salvesen. She was a member of the high Society in Oslo, and a friend of the King's family. In 1938 Salvesen travelled to the United Kingdom along with Queen Maud, where she also visited Scotland in order to study women's preparedness. Back in Norway she founded the organization Blåklokkene, which organized first aid courses and other initiatives. The organization developed into what was called "K.B." (abbreviation for Kongens Budbringere, or English: The King's Messengers). Among their activities were helping people who wanted to continue fighting in Northern Norway, with their travel via Sweden. The group also distributed pictures of King Haakon all over the country. According to her memoirs, the group had 800 contacts throughout Norway late 1940. Gunnar Sønsteby mentions that Salvesen had supported his first effort to reach the United Kingdom by boat.

Salvesen was first arrested in January 1942, being among the "King hostages", and spent one night at the prison Møllergata 19 and one week at Grini. She was arrested a second time in September 1942, when she was held in isolation at Grini until June 1943. She was then transferred with the ship SS Monte Rosa to Aarhus, and further by train transport via Hamburg to the Ravensbrück concentration camp in Germany.

In Ravensbrück, she was assigned a position at the "hospital" (German: Revier). While in Ravensbrück she was contacted by Wanda Hjort, with whom she was remotely related. The families Hjort and Seip had received a letter from professor Harald Salvesen at Rikshospitalet, asking whether they could get his wife Sylvia's signature on a document and deliver a packet to her. Wanda Hjort and her brother Johan travelled to Ravensbrück, where they received the signature. Later, Wanda managed to achieve a Sprecherlaubnis from a higher SS officer in Berlin, and with this document she was presented to her "aunt", Ravensbrück prisoner 20,837 Sylvia Salvesen.

Salvesen was later able to send a complete list of the Norwegian female prisoners in Ravensbrück, brought by a German nurse to the people in Gross Kreutz. The information was transmitted to Stockholm and to Folke Bernadotte. According to numbers given by the Germans, there were 13 Norwegian and 2 Danish prisoners in the Ravensbrück camp, while the Gross Kreutz group could document that there were 92 Norwegian and 20 Danish prisoners in Ravensbrück.

== Post-war activities ==
Salvesen returned from Germany with the Swedish Red Cross and their White Buses operation. In 1946, she witnessed at the Ravensbrück Trials in Hamburg. Her testimony both described the general conditions in the camp, and more specific incidents at the Revier. These incidents included the practice of induced abortion of pregnancy, treatment of newborn babies in a way that resulted in death of most of them, experimental surgery on patients, "selection for transports" to the gas chambers, and sterilizing of gypsies. Salvesen was the first witness to testify at the trial, from the afternoon 5 December 1946, continuing morning and afternoon on 6 December, and ending after cross examinations 7 December 1946. The next witnesses were Helene Dziedziecka from Poland and Neeltje Epker from the Netherlands, and later Odette Sansom and Violette Lecoq.

In 1947 she published a memoir, Tilgi - men glem ikke (English: Forgive - but do not forget). She was awarded the King's Medal of Merit in gold in 1965.
