= Harald Salvesen =

Norwegian medical academic (1889–1972)

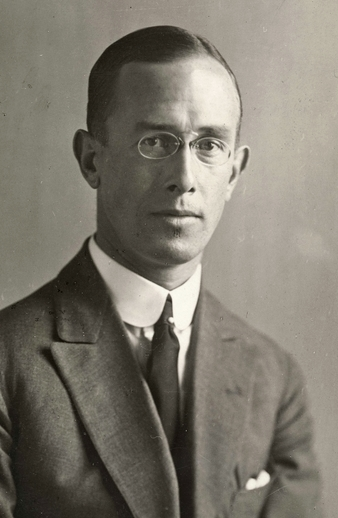
- Harald Salvesen, c. 1935
- Born: 7 January 1889; Larvik, Norway
- Died: 22 January 1972 (aged 83)
- Occupations: medical doctor and internist
- Spouse: Sylvia Salvesen

Harald Astrup Salvesen (7 January 1889 – 22 January 1972) was a Norwegian medical doctor and internist, a professor at Rikshospitalet in Oslo. His publications were mainly in the field of physiological chemistry. He was married to Sylvia Salvesen.

He was decorated Commander of the Order of St. Olav in 1957.
