= John Burnet Hall =

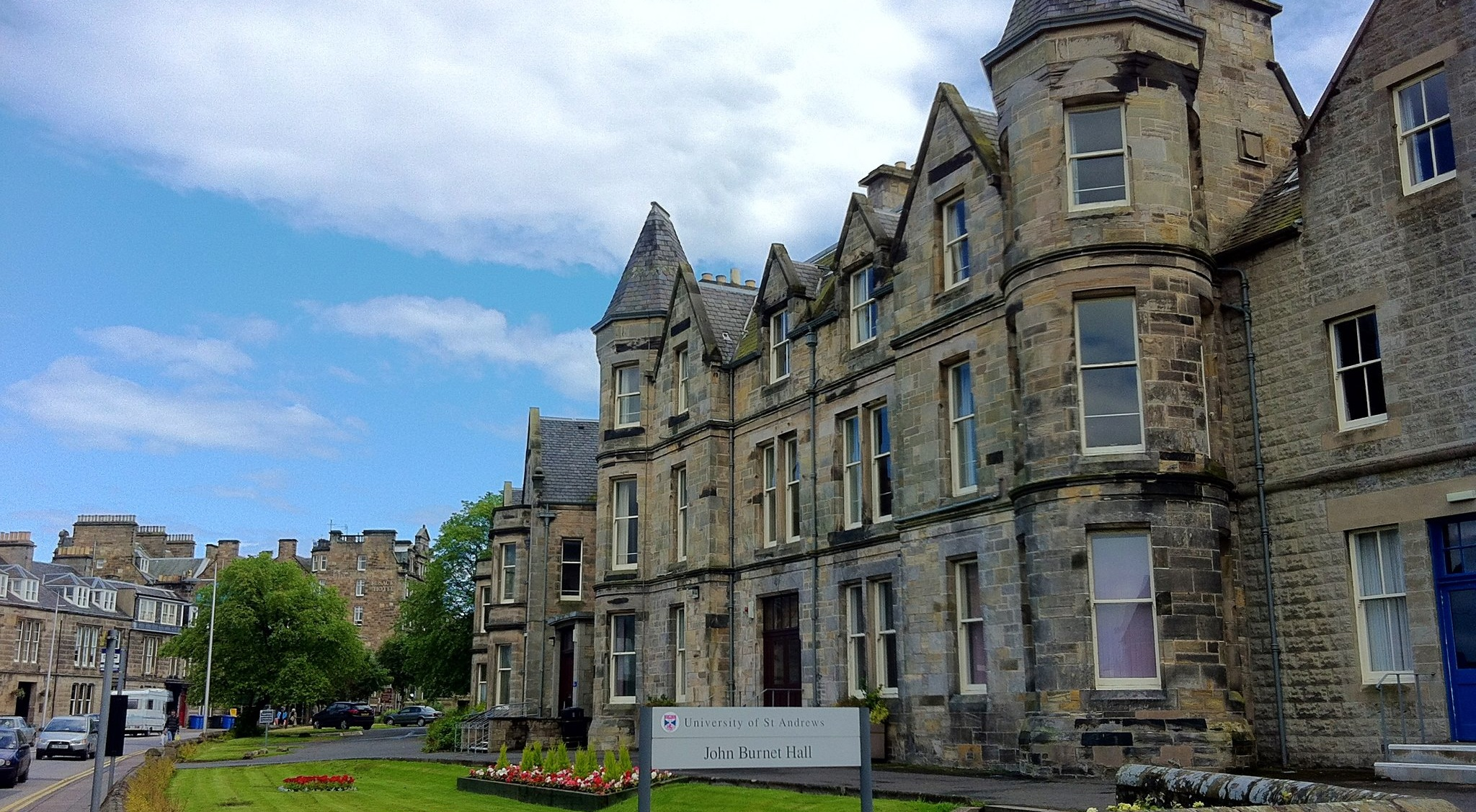
- The original "Atholl" segment of the building. Other segments include Kilmallie, Fairways, and the Annexe.
- Former names: The Atholl Hotel
- Alternative names: Atholl; JBH

General information
- Type: Student residence
- Location: John Burnet Hall; 30 Links Crescent; St Andrews; Fife; KY16 9JF, St Andrews, Fife, Scotland
- Coordinates: 56.342136°N 2.806572°W
- Completed: 1898; 128 years ago
- Renovated: 1962
- Cost: £40 000 + £25 000
- Owner: University of St Andrews

Website
- University managed website

John Burnet Hall (also known as Atholl or JBH) is the smallest capacity Hall of Residence owned by the University of St Andrews. It was formerly the Atholl Hotel and is located in the town of St Andrews, Scotland. It has 76 bedrooms, of which 34 are shared in the main building and 36 single en-suite rooms in the Annexe. All rooms are catered, meals are provided to residents three times a day Monday-Friday and breakfast and lunch are served on weekends. Prices for 2024–25 are £8,882 (single room,) £8,083 (shared room,) and £10,680 (single en-suite Annexe room.)

== Naming ==
The hall is named after the Scottish classicist, John Burnet. It was formerly called the Atholl Hotel before it was purchased by the University of St Andrews.

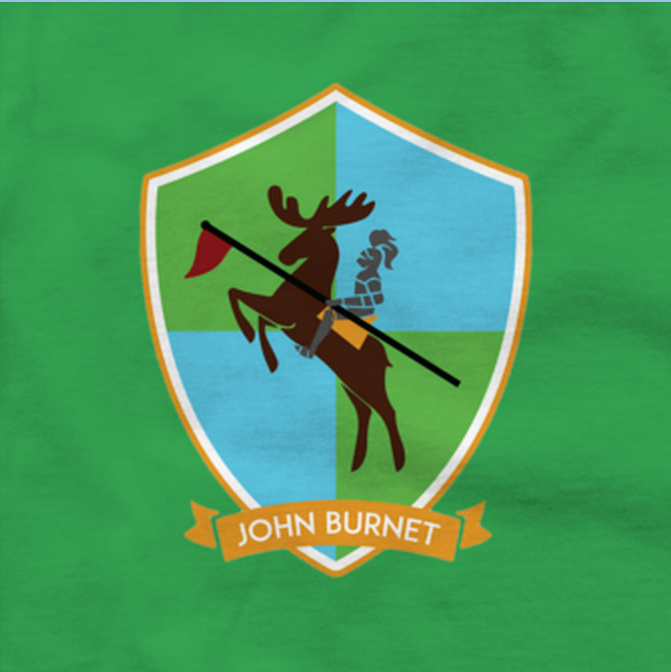
The John Burnet Hall Coat of Arms

== Location ==
John Burnet Hall is located on Links Crescent, which is at the end of A91 road. The hall overlooks the 18th hole of the St Andrews Links Old Course and the North Sea and West Sands can be seen from the building.

== Facilities ==
John Burnet Hall has four communal spaces; Front Hall – a meeting spot among the residents which has a couch and several chairs. The TV lounge offers seating and gaming facilities. West Lounge has a piano, seating and cushions, a pool table, a table tennis table, and a sound system projector and lights setup. 2018 saw the addition of the common room on the second floor of main building with views of the Old Course, a Nintendo Switch, chairs, and kitchenette facilities.

The laundry is serviced by provider, Washstation and the Wi-Fi is provided by Eduroam. A drinks vending machine is in operation in the main building.

== Traditions ==
Due to John Burnet Hall's small size, its residents form a close-knit community each year.

Its traditional events include three annual balls: one held in north-east Fife's Fernie Castle at the beginning of the first semester, the Hall Ball towards the beginning of the second semester, and the Traditions Ball held near the end of the second semester, although, these balls were sporadic during the COVID-19 pandemic.

The hall colours are green and blue, and the hall's official animal is a moose.

The hall's traditional songs, chants, and traditions are generally taught to new residents within a week of their arrival in September in preparation for the annual 'Clan Warfare' event. Hall songs include the hall anthem John Burnet, La La La and Oh John Burnet is Wonderful (to the tune of When the Saints Go Marching In.)

In addition, the hall maintains a form of rivalry with nearby University Hall. A rivalry which is referenced in the aforementioned 'Oh John Burnet is Wonderful'.
