= Christian Salvesen =

Scottish whaling and transport company

- Industry: Whaling; Transport; Logistics
- Founded: 1872
- Defunct: December 2007
- Fate: Merged with Norbert Dentressangle
- Successor: Norbert Dentressangle
- Headquarters: Edinburgh, Scotland, UK
- Key people: Christian Salvesen (founder)
- Parent: Norbert Dentressangle

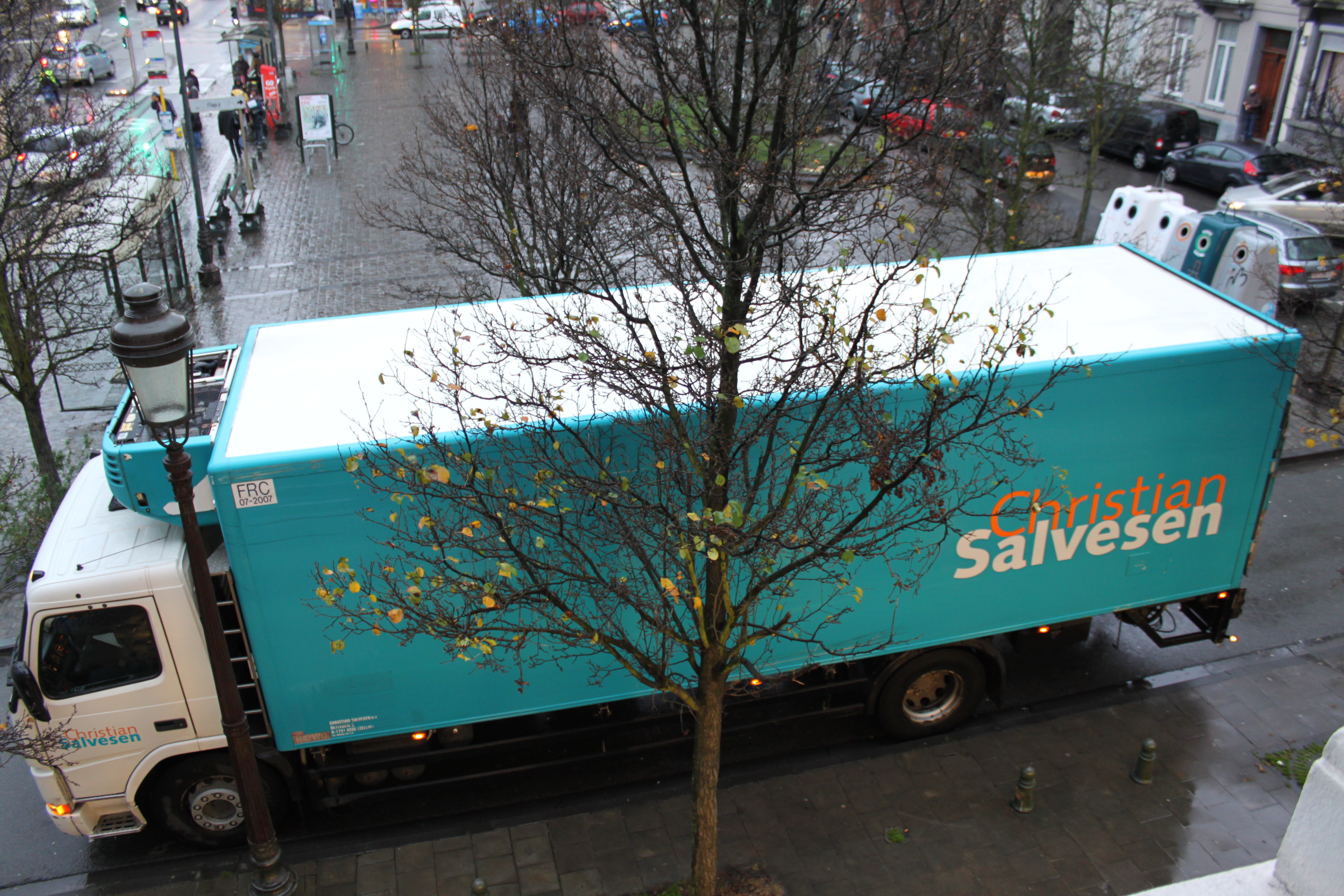
A Christian Salvesen lorry in 2009

Christian Salvesen & Co. was a Scottish whaling, transport and logistics company with a long and varied history, employing 13,000 staff and operating in seven countries in western Europe. In December 2007, it was acquired by French listed transport group Norbert Dentressangle.

== History ==
Salve Christian Frederik Salvesen (1827–1911) was born in Mandal, Vest-Agder, Norway. Christian Salvesen was the son of Norwegian merchant shipowner, Thomas Salvesen (1787–1853). In 1846, his older brother Johan Theodor Salvesen (1820–1865) had gone into the partnership of Turnbull, Salvesen and Company with George W. Turnbull and established an affiliate office in Leith near Edinburgh, Scotland.

The oldest brother, Carl Emil Salvesen (1816–1877) also moved to Leith but his role in the company is unclear. Christian Salvesen joined the partnership after migrating from Mandal in 1851. He lived and operated from 20 Charlotte Street in Leith (now known as Queen Charlotte Street).

In 1868, Christian Salvesen, together with Wilhelm August Thams (1812–1884) founded the mining company Ørkedals Mining Company and bought a number of small mines around Løkken, Norway. In 1872, Christian Salvesen left the partnership and set up Christian Salvesen & Co., based in Leith.

Initially, the company operated as shipping and forwarding agents, shipbrokers and timber merchants. Christian Salvesen & Co. began buying steamers in the 1880s, and in 1886 started a line to Stavanger, with runs along the Norwegian coast.

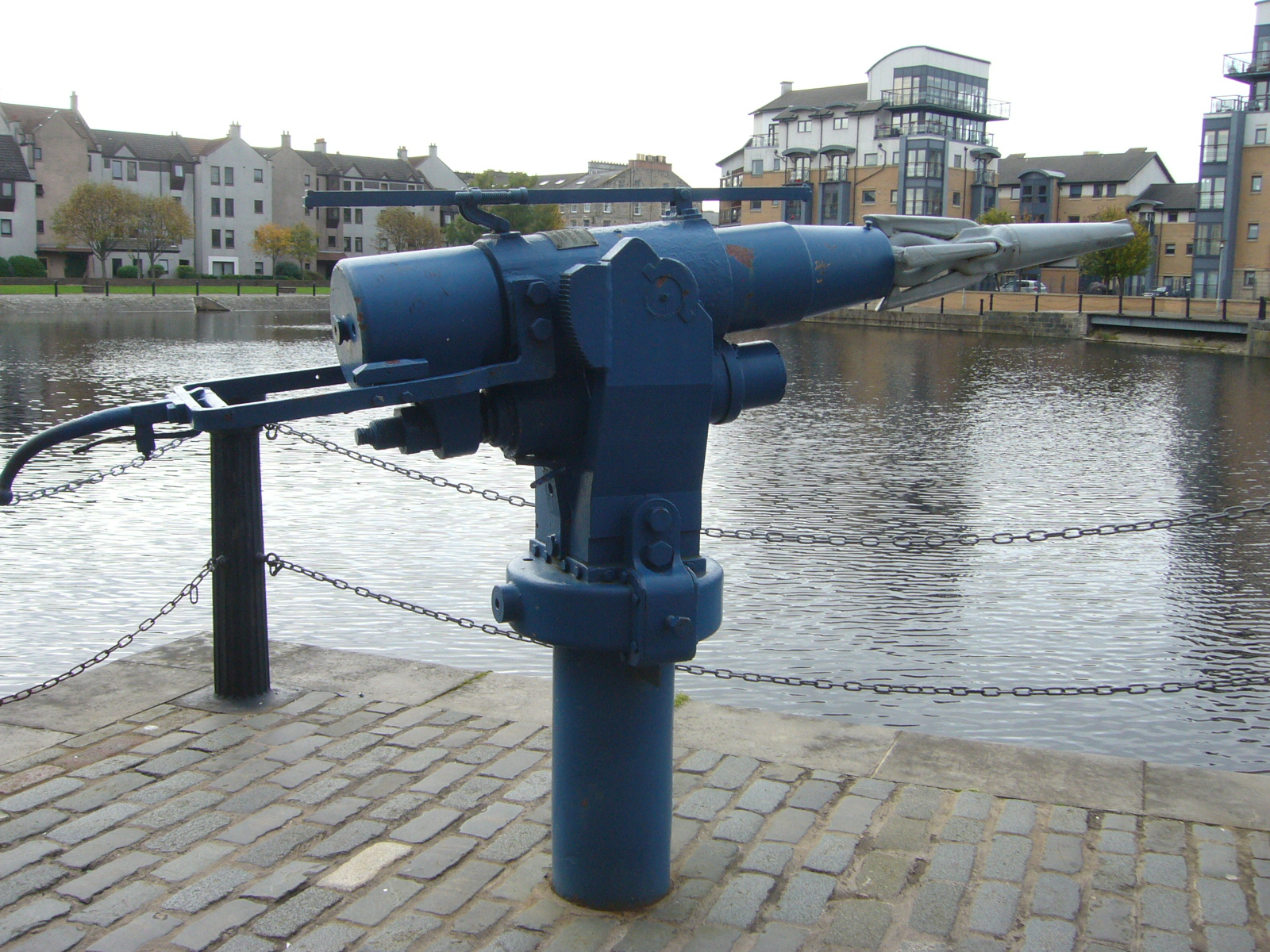
Salvesen harpoon on The Shore, Leith

In 1883, Christian Salvesen, delegated management of shipping operations to his eldest sons, Thomas and Frederick, who became partners in the firm. In the early 1900s, the company developed significant interests in whaling, initially in the Arctic, and then in the Antarctic.

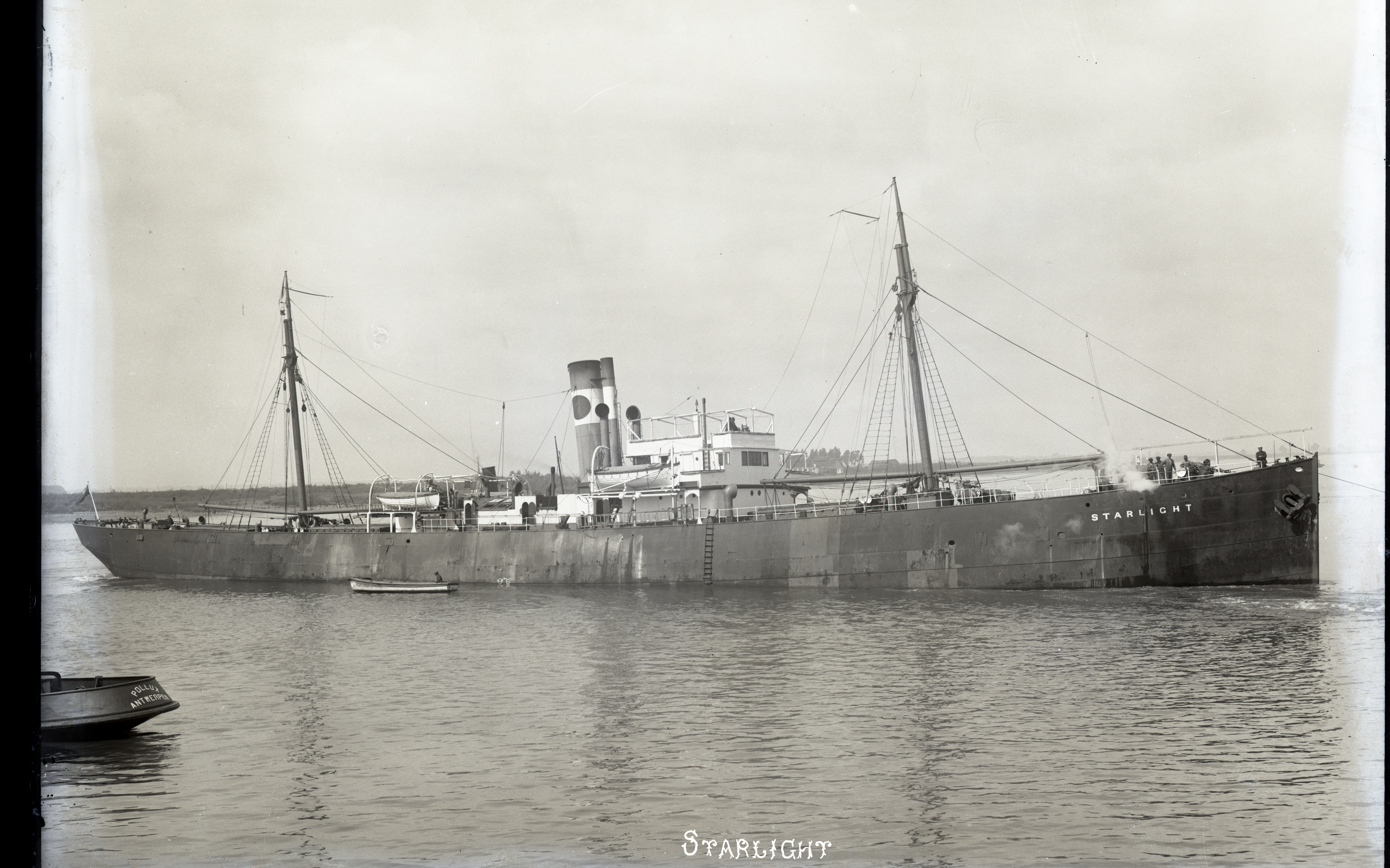
Starlight, a cargo steamship that Salvesen bought in 1907, and sold in 1916

It established and operated from a base at Leith Harbour (named after Salvesen's base in Scotland) on the island of South Georgia, to the south east of the Falkland Islands. In 1908, in partnership with Christian Thams, Christian Salvesen also invested in the construction of the first electric railway from Løkken to Thamshavn in Norway in support of their mining interests.

In the years 1950 to 1962, the whaling ships Southern Harvester and Southern Venturer belonged to the company. These ships were floating factories, and the core of a whaling expedition. Each expedition consisted of a floating factory as well as a team of whale catchers which were equipped with an onboard hangar which housed a Westland Whirlwind helicopter which was used for whale spotting.

One of the company's whale catchers, Southern Actor, now lies at the whaling museum in Sandefjord, Norway, and is preserved as a floating museum ship. They ceased whaling in 1963 and ceased shipping in 1990, thereafter concentrating on road haulage.

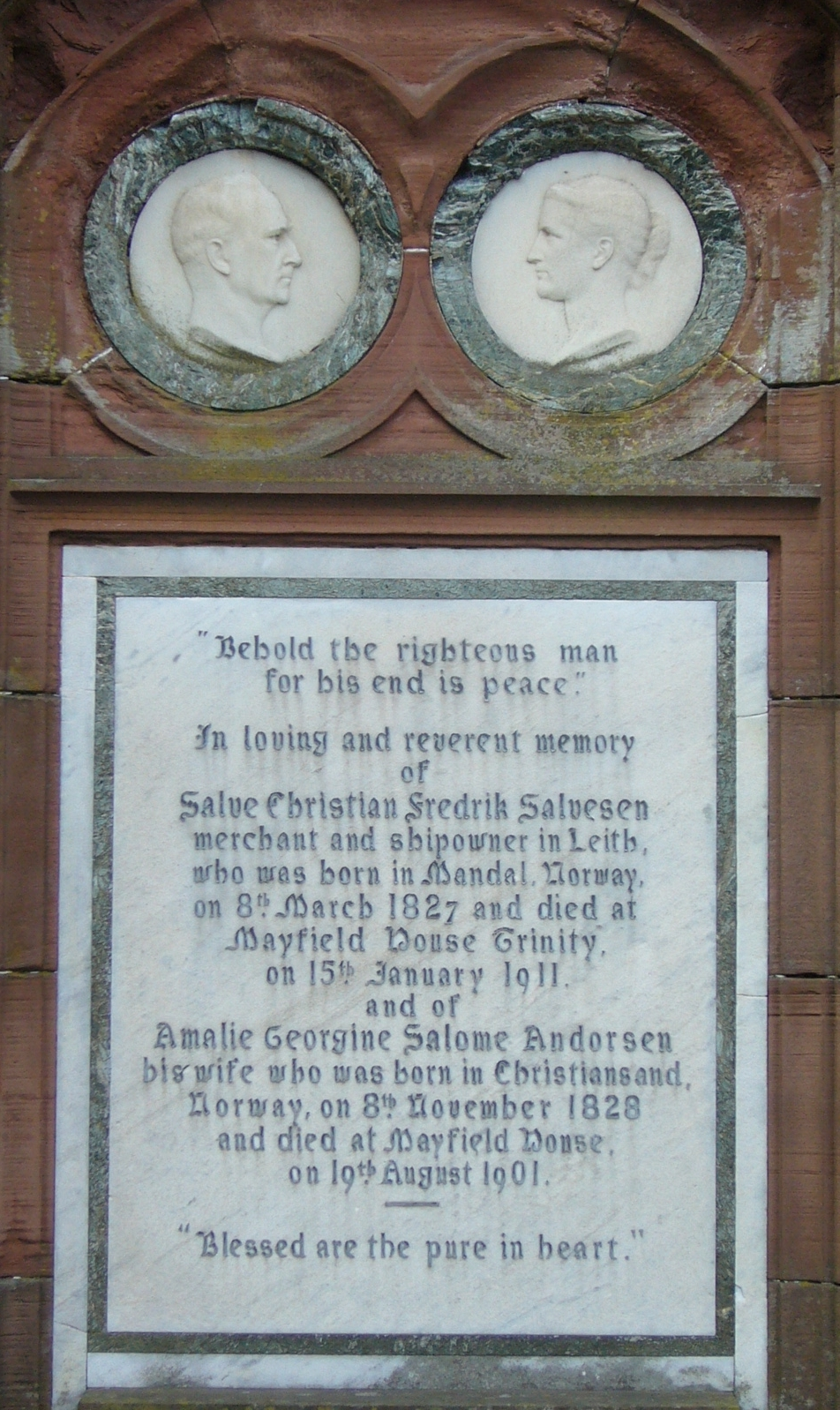
Salvesen grave in Rosebank Cemetery

As the boom in whaling ended after World War II, Salvesen moved into the commercial trawler business and also bought a cold store in Grimsby. It traded primarily in housebuilding, general food freezing and oil before moving back into the transport business by buying Swift Services.

Christian Salvesen's house stood at Goldenacre in Edinburgh, on Ferry Road opposite Inverleith Row, and closing the vista along that road. A huge villa from around 1865 set in extensive gardens, it was demolished in the 1960s and replaced by Edinburgh's tax office, that in turn was demolished in the early 21st century, and is now a housing site.

His offices were on the south side of Bernard Street, Leith, in a building that doubled as the Norwegian Consulate for Edinburgh (now a Chinese restaurant). He is buried in Rosebank Cemetery on Pilrig Street in Leith.

== Family ==
Salvesen was married to Amalie Georgine Salome Andorsen (1828 to 1901), and their children included Edward Theodore Salvesen (Lord Salvesen) and Theodore Salvesen. Their grandchildren included Harold Salvesen.

He was uncle to Henry Adolph Salvesen.

== Philanthropy ==
Christian Salvesen's whaling ships brought the first penguins back to Edinburgh and donated them to Edinburgh Zoo. Edinburgh therefore became the first zoo in the world to house and breed penguins.

The Salvesen family lost many sons and nephews in World War I. Partly as a result of this they built several memorial housing developments, most on Scottish Veterans' Garden City principles:

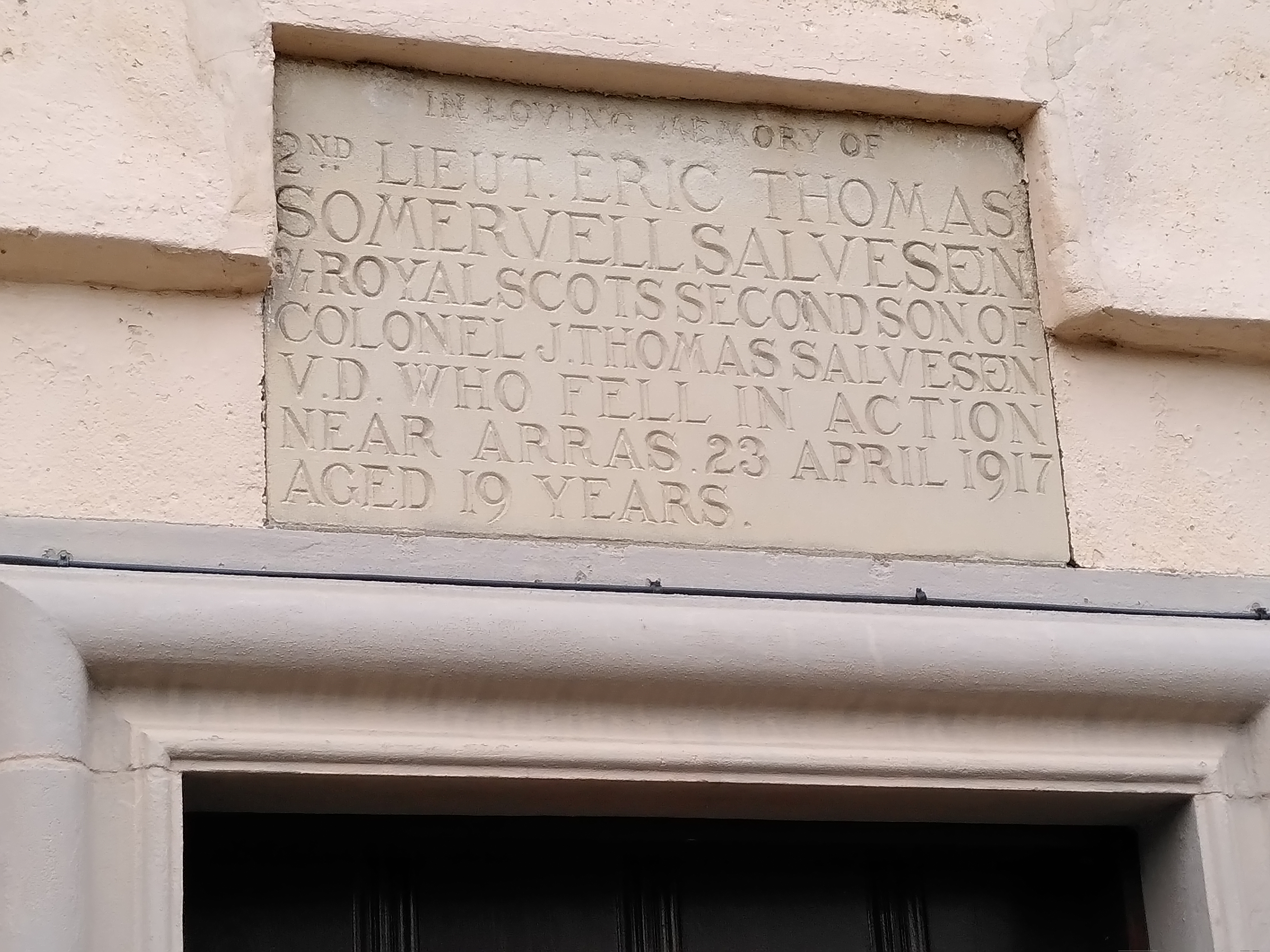
- Memorial to 2nd Lt Eric Thomas Somervell Salveson on house in Earl Haig Gardens, Trinity Edinburgh
  Earl Haig Gardens (1925) off East Trinity Road in Edinburgh, Scotland. For injured and retired army personnel. with memorial tablets over the doors to Salvesen family members and others killed in the conflict such as 2nd Lt Edward Maxwell Salvesen and 2nd Lt Eric Thomas Somervell Salveson.
- Salvesen Gardens (1948) in Muirhouse, Edinburgh, for army personnel.
- Salvesen Crescent also in Muirhouse, for retired lighthouse keepers (who played a big part in the survival of their fleet).

== After whaling ==
Salvesens left the whaling industry in 1963, thus ending whaling in Scotland, and reinvented itself as a major European transport and logistics company. In 1985, the company went public as a diversified industrial group, with interests in shipping, brick manufacture, housebuilding, cold storage and distribution, rock and roll lighting hire (Light and Sound Design Ltd, now part of PRG inc.), theatre and television lighting manufacture (Lumo Lighting, was part of Lee Colortran International ) and generator hire.

As a public company, the business focussed on European logistics, buying Swift Transport Services in October 1993. The non-logistics businesses were sold in this period.

Salvesen have had mixed fortunes since the beginning of the 1990s. A potential takeover by Hays plc in August 1996, which could have valued the shares in the 350–400 pence range, did not result in a formal offer. This did however lead to the spin off of the generator hire business, Aggreko in March 1997, and the arrival of a new Chief Executive, Edward Roderick, who led the business until his sacking in May 2004.

In this period, a Swedish investor AB Custos discussed buying the company, and yet again no formal offer was issued to shareholders. This was in July 2000.

In October 2004, a merger was proposed with TDG plc, but this apparently failed because of the pre merger positioning of key executives from both companies. On 2 October 2007, the board recommended a cash offer by Norbert Dentressangle for £254.4 million to buy Christian Salvesen. The takeover was completed on 14 December that year.

== See also ==
- Chr. Salvesen & Chr. Thams's Communications Aktieselskab
- The Memoir Club – Robin Salvesen Memoir, Ship's Husband
- Salvesen Archive at Edinburgh University Library catalogue entry

== Other sources ==
- Elliot, Gerald (1998) Whaling Enterprise: Salvesen in the Antarctic (Michael Russell Publishing Ltd) ISBN 978-0-85955-241-7
- Salvesen, Edward Theodore (1949) Memoirs of Lord Salvesen (W. & R. Chambers)
- Somner, Graeme (1984) From 70 North to 70 South: A history of the Christian Salvesen fleet (Christian Salvesen Ltd) ISBN 978-0-9509199-0-4
- Vamplew, Wray (1975) Salvesen of Leith (Scottish Academic Press) ISBN 0-7011-2037-1
- Watson, Nigel (1996) The story of Christian Salvesen, 1846-1996 (London: James & James Ltd.)
