= Edward Theodore Salvesen =

British judge (1857–1942)

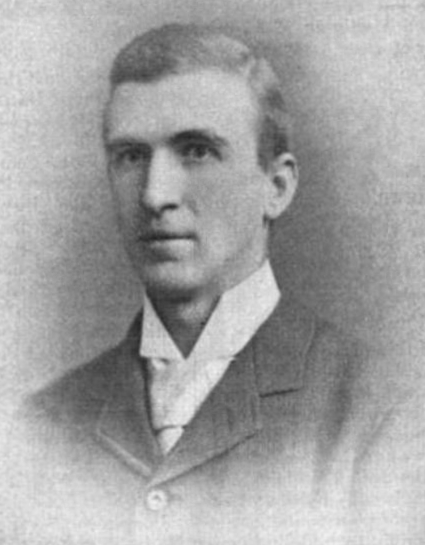
- Born: 20 July 1857; Leith, Scotland
- Died: 23 February 1942 (aged 84); Edinburgh, Scotland
- Burial place: Dean Cemetery
- Education: University of Edinburgh
- Occupations: Lawyer, politician, judge
- Political party: Liberal Unionist
- Spouse: Isabelle Georgine Maxwell Trayner (m. 1886)
- Father: Christian Salvesen

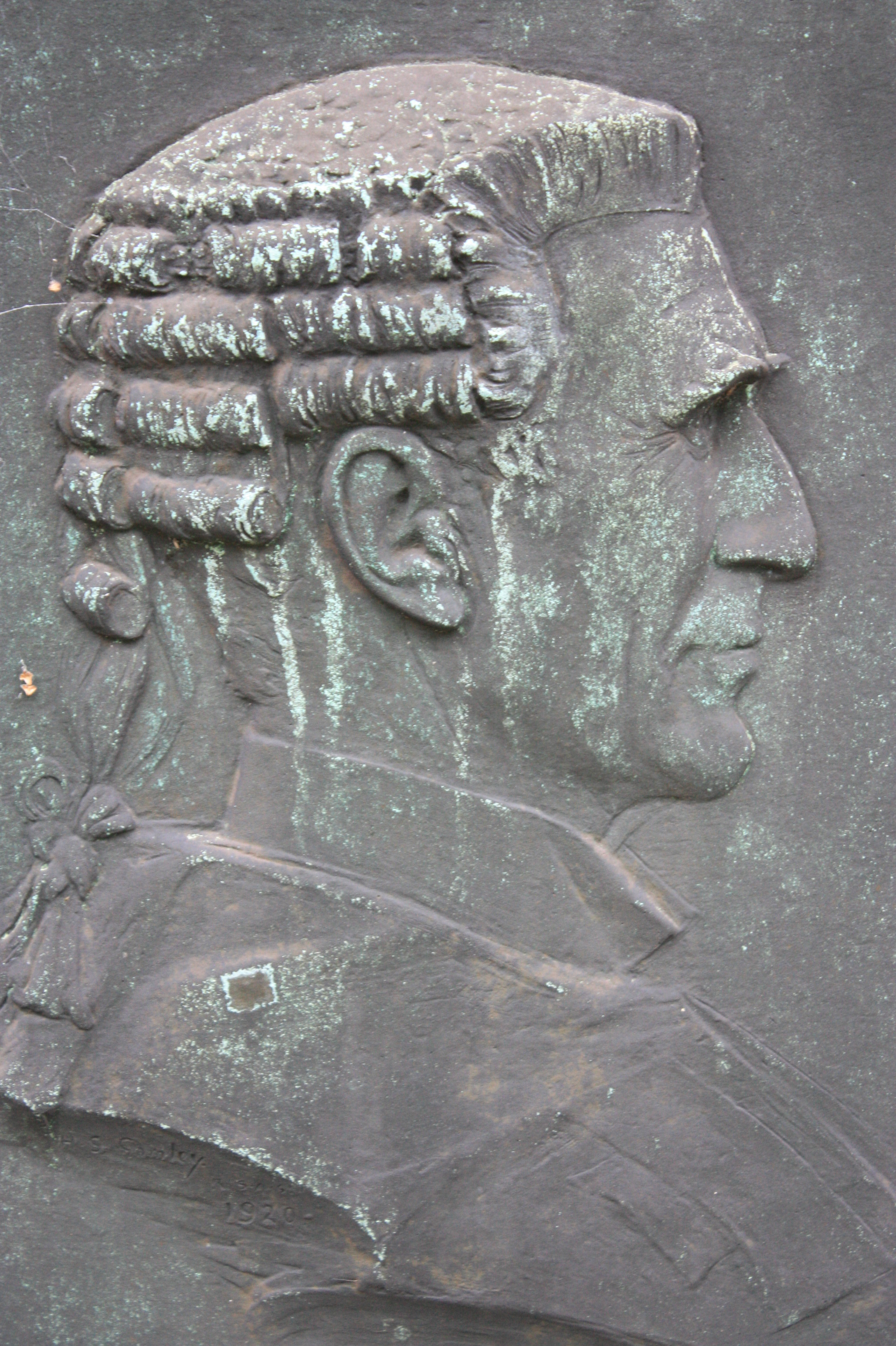
Edward Salvesen by H S Gamley, Dean Cemetery

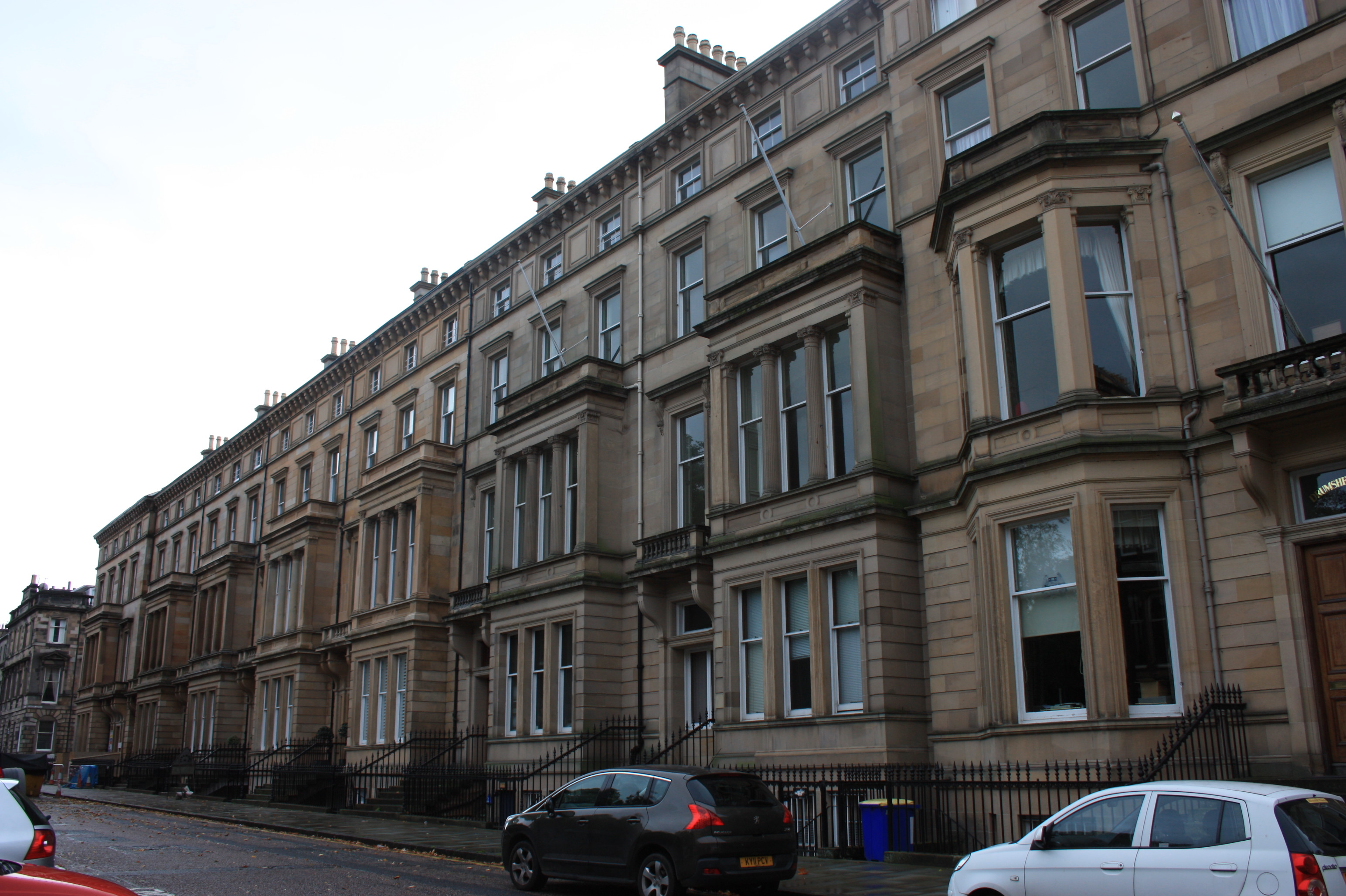
38 to 44 Drumsheugh Gardens, Edinburgh

Edward Theodore Salvesen, Lord Salvesen, PC, FRSE (20 July 1857 – 23 February 1942) was a British lawyer, politician and judge who rose to be a Senator of the College of Justice.

== Life ==
Edward Theodore Salvesen was the son of Christian Frederik Salvesen (1827–1911), the Norwegian-born founder of the Christian Salvesen shipping line of Leith. He was born at 20 Charlotte Street in Leith, where his father lived and worked in his early days in Scotland. The family moved to Catherine Bank House on Newhaven Road as his father's fortunes increased. facing onto Bonnington Park House and Victoria Park (the house was demolished c. 1900 to create the Dudley estate).

Salvesen studied law at the University of Edinburgh, and was called to the Scottish Bar in 1880, becoming a Queen's Counsel in 1899. He was an unsuccessful Liberal Unionist parliamentary candidate for Leith Burghs in 1900, and for Bute in 1905.

Salvesen's Edinburgh residence was at 40 Drumsheugh Gardens, a large townhouse.

He was appointed Sheriff of Roxburgh, Berwick and Selkirk in November 1901, serving as such until early 1905. He held office of Solicitor General for Scotland from 2 February–October 1905.

In October 1905 he was appointed a judge of the Court of Session, a post he held until 1922. He was also created a Senator of the College of Justice and adopted the title of Lord Salvesen. He was appointed a Privy Counsellor in 1922 and was also a member of the Judicial Committee of the Privy Council.

He was the Lord Rector's Assessor on the Courts of the University of Edinburgh from 1929 to 1933, President of the Royal Zoological Society of Scotland, Chairman of the Royal Scots Association, Fellow of the Royal Society of Edinburgh, and President of the Royal Scottish Geographical Society from 1920 to 1926. He was a Commander of the Order of the White Rose of Finland and Order of St. Olav of Norway.

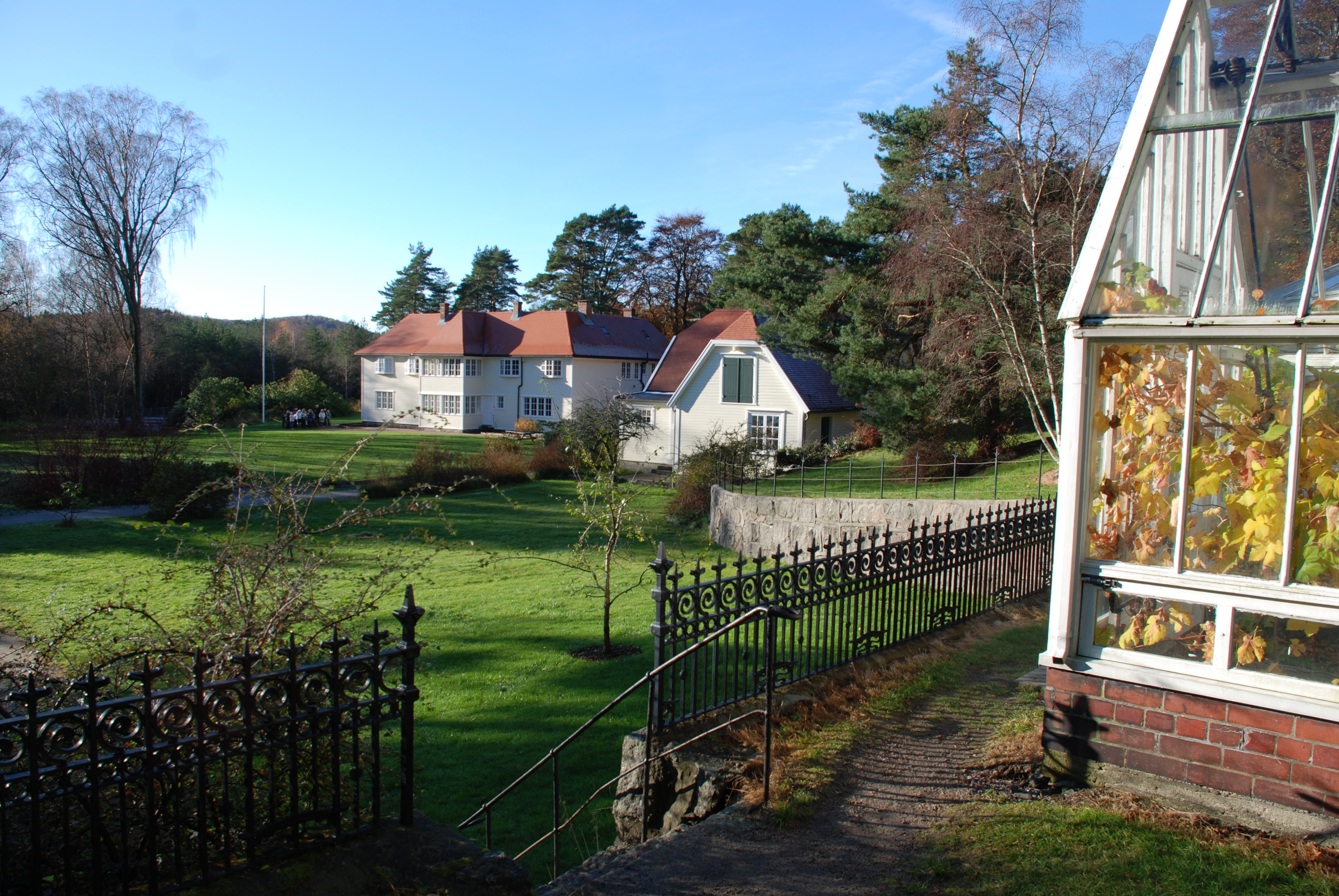
Risøbank Mansion

Salvesen died in Edinburgh on 23 February 1942. He is buried in the 20th-century extension to Dean Cemetery in Edinburgh against the northmost wall. The bronzes (including a portrait head) are by Henry Snell Gamley.

== Family ==
He married Isabelle Georgine Maxwell Trayner (1865-1939), daughter of John Trayner, Lord Trayner, on 20 July 1886.

His cousin was Henry Adolph Salvesen FRSE.

== Risøbank Manor ==
Edward T. Salvesen built his holiday home Risøbank Manor in Mandal, in the county of Vest-Agder, Norway. His father, Christian Salvesen, had acquired the property in 1862. The manor building was designed by the Scottish architect Robert Lorimer and was completed in 1901. It was acquired by the government and the local authorities in 1971. Lindesnes municipality is now responsible for maintenance of the buildings. In 1977 it completed a major refurbishment of Risøbank. The estate is now part of the Furulunden Nature Park.

== Other sources ==
- Somner, Graeme (1984), From 70 North to 70 South: A history of the Christian Salvesen fleet (Christian Salvesen Ltd) ISBN 978-0-9509199-0-4
- Elliot, Gerald (1998), Whaling Enterprise: Salvesen in the Antarctic (Michael Russell Publishing Ltd) ISBN 978-0-85955-241-7

Legal offices
| Preceded by David Dundas | Solicitor General for Scotland; 1905 | Succeeded by James Avon Clyde |
