= Borsa =

Borsa may refer to:

== Places ==
=== Greece ===
- Borsas, a village in the municipal unit of Mykines, Argolis, Greece

=== Norway ===
- Børsa, a village in Skaun municipality in Trøndelag county, Norway
- Børsa (municipality), a former municipality in Trøndelag county, Norway
- Børsa Church, a church in Skaun municipality in Trøndelag county, Norway

=== Romania ===
- Borșa (Hungarian: Borsa), a town in Maramureș County
- Borșa, Cluj, a commune in Cluj County, which includes Borșa-Cătun and Borșa-Crestaia villages
- Borșa, a village in Săcădat Commune, Bihor County
- Borșa, a village in Vlădeni Commune, Iași County
- Borșa (river), a river in Cluj County

=== Slovakia ===
- Borša, a village in Slovakia
- Hruba Borsa, a village and municipality in western Slovakia

== People ==
- Andrea Borsa (born 1972), Italian football player
- Andy Borsa (1944–2016), American politician
- Emilio Borsa (1857–1931), Italian painter
- James Borsa (c. 1260 – 1325/1332), lord in the Kingdom of Hungary
- Roger Borsa (1060/1 – 1111), son of Robert Guiscard, the Norman conqueror of southern Italy and Sicily
- Roland Borsa (died 1301), voivod of Transylvania
- Borsa Brown (born 1975), Hungarian author

== Other ==
- Borsa Italiana, Italy's main stock exchange
- Borsa Istanbul, Turkey's stock exchange
