= Skaun =

Skaun may refer to:

== Places ==
- Skaun Municipality, a municipality in Trøndelag county, Norway
- Skaun (village), a village within Skaun Municipality in Trøndelag county, Norway
- Skaun Church, a church in Skaun Municipality in Trøndelag county, Norway

== Sports ==
- Skaun BK, a football club based in Skaun Municipality in Trøndelag county, Norway
- Skaun IL, a sports club based in Skaun Municipality in Trøndelag county, Norway
