= Malmsjøen =

Lake in Skaun, Norway

- Interactive map of the lake
- Location: Skaun Municipality, Trøndelag
- Coordinates: 63.2263°N 10.0797°E
- Basin countries: Norway
- Max. length: 2.5 kilometres (1.6 mi)
- Max. width: 2 kilometres (1.2 mi)
- Surface area: 2.29 km^{2} (0.88 sq mi)
- Shore length^{1}: 8.93 kilometres (5.55 mi)
- Surface elevation: 186 metres (610 ft)
- References: NVE
- ^{1} Shore length is not a well-defined measure.

Malmsjøen is a lake in Skaun Municipality in Trøndelag county, Norway. It is located about 1.5 kilometres (0.93 mi) southeast of the village of Skaun, about 7 kilometres (4.3 mi) north of the village of Korsvegen (in Melhus Municipality), and about 10 kilometres (6.2 mi) southwest of the village of Melhus. The Norwegian County Road 709 runs along the northern shore of the lake.

== See also ==
- List of lakes in Norway
