= Melby, Norway =

Village in Skaun Municipality, Norway

Melby
- Village
- Interactive map of Melby
- Location within Trøndelag Location within Norway
- Coordinates: 63.2387°N 09.9833°E
- Country: Norway
- Region: Central Norway
- County: Trøndelag
- District: Orkdalen
- Municipality: Skaun Municipality
- Elevation: 160 m (520 ft)
- Time zone: UTC+01:00 (CET)
  - Summer (DST): UTC+02:00 (CEST)
- Post Code: 7357 Skaun

Melby is a farming village in Skaun Municipality in Trøndelag county, Norway. It is located in the south-central part of the municipality, about 4 kilometres (2.5 mi) southwest of the village of Skaun and the Norwegian County Road 709 and about 7 kilometres (4.3 mi) south of Eggkleiva. The town of Orkanger and it suburb of Fannrem (in the neighboring Orkland Municipality) both lie about 12 kilometres (7.5 mi) to the west.

There is an old, preserved school building dating from 1878 in Melby. The school building is a part of the local museum Skaun bygdamuseum. The area is named Melby (Old Norse: Meðalbýr), which means "middle farm".
