= Bjarne Saltnes =

Norwegian politician (1934–2016)

Bjarne Saltnes (26 February 1934 – 16 May 2016) was a Norwegian politician for the Labour Party.

== Biography ==
He was born in Skaun Municipality as a son of a mill worker, and after vocational school as a carpenter in 1951, and some years as a construction labourer, he worked at the mill J.C. Piene & Søn from 1964 to 1997. From 1972 to 1994 he was a board member of the company as an employees' representative, and from 1977 to 1986 he chaired the trade union Møllearbeidernes Fagforening.

Saltnes was a member of the Labour Party for over fifty years, and was a member of the municipal council of Buvik Municipality from 1955 to 1963. After a municipal merger, he sat on the municipal council of Skaun Municipality from 1965 to 1975 and 1979 to 1991, serving as mayor there in 1971–1975 and 1979–1983. He chaired the Skaun Labour Party from 1965 to 1967. He served as a deputy representative to the Parliament of Norway from Sør-Trøndelag during the terms 1977–1981, 1981–1985 and 1985–1989. In total he met during 238 days of parliamentary session.

Saltnes also chaired Buvik IL in 1951–1952 and 1960–1962, held other municipal posts, and was a member of Statens korn- og kraftforråd from 1972 to 1986.
