= Viggja =

Village in Skaun Municipality, Norway

- Village
- Interactive map of Viggja
- Location within Trøndelag Location within Norway
- Coordinates: 63.3452°N 09.9908°E
- Country: Norway
- Region: Central Norway
- County: Trøndelag
- District: Orkdalen
- Municipality: Skaun Municipality

Area
  - Total: 0.22 km^{2} (0.085 sq mi)
- Elevation: 7 m (23 ft)

Population (2024)
  - Total: 354
  - Density: 1,609/km^{2} (4,170/sq mi)
- Time zone: UTC+01:00 (CET)
  - Summer (DST): UTC+02:00 (CEST)
- Post Code: 7354 Viggja

Viggja is a village in Skaun Municipality in Trøndelag county, Norway. The village is located on the shores of the Orkdalsfjorden, an arm of the Trondheimsfjorden, about 8 kilometres (5.0 mi) northeast of the town of Orkanger and about 5.5 kilometres (3.4 mi) northwest of the village of Børsa. The European route E39 highway passes about 2 kilometres (1.2 mi) south of the village.

The 0.22-square-kilometre (54-acre) village has a population (2024) of 354 and a population density of 1,609 inhabitants per square kilometre (4,170/sq mi).
