= Norwegian County Road 709 =

Road in Trøndelag, Norway

Coordinates: 63.29930°N 10.05789°E

County Road 709
- Bokmål: Fylkesvei 709; Nynorsk: Fylkesveg 709
- Formerly Riksvei 709

Route information
- Maintained by Norwegian Public Roads Administration
- Length: 14.1 km (8.8 mi)

Major junctions
- North end: E39 at Børsa
- Børsa village Eggkleiva village Fv470 ←Morken; Børselva bridge Fv756 →Sætran; Fv754 →Melby; Skaun village Fv750 ←Rekstad
- South end: Fv708 at Hove

Location
- Country: Norway
- Counties: Trøndelag
- Major cities: Børsa, Eggkleiva, Skaun

Highway system
- Roads in Norway; National Roads; County Roads
| ← Fv708 | → Fv710 |

Norwegian County Road 709 (Norwegian: Fylkesvei 709, abbreviated as Fv709) is a Norwegian county road which runs between the villages of Børsa and Hove in Skaun Municipality in Trøndelag county, Norway. The 14.1-kilometre (8.8 mi) long road intersects with the European route E39 at its northern terminus. Prior to 1 January 2010, this road was a Norwegian national road; on that date the regional reform came into force, and the status of this road was downgraded from a national road to a county road.

== Path ==
The road begins about 100 metres (330 ft) north of European route E39 at Børsøra and goes south to the village of Hove, where it meets Norwegian County Road 708.

- Børsa village (northern terminus)
- E39 ←Buvika, →Orkanger
- Eggkleiva village
- Fv470 →Morken
- Børselva bridge
- Fv756 ←Sætran
- Fv754 →Melby
- Skaun village
- Fv750 ←Rekstad
- Fv754 →Melby
- Fv750 ←Rekstad
- Lake Malmsjøen
- Hove village
- Fv708 ←Melhus, →Korsvegen (southern terminus)
