= Eggkleiva =

Village in Skaun Municipality, Norway

- Village
- Interactive map of Eggkleiva
- Location within Trøndelag Location within Norway
- Coordinates: 63.2813°N 10.0499°E
- Country: Norway
- Region: Central Norway
- County: Trøndelag
- District: Orkdalen
- Municipality: Skaun Municipality

Area
  - Total: 0.17 km^{2} (0.066 sq mi)
- Elevation: 64 m (210 ft)

Population (2024)
  - Total: 244
  - Density: 1,435/km^{2} (3,720/sq mi)
- Time zone: UTC+01:00 (CET)
  - Summer (DST): UTC+02:00 (CEST)
- Post Code: 7355 Eggkleiva

Eggkleiva is a village in Skaun Municipality in Trøndelag county, Norway. It is located along Norwegian County Road 709, about halfway between the villages of Skaun and Børsa. The village of Melby lies about 6 kilometres (3.7 mi) southwest of Eggkleiva. Eggkleiva sits on the northern shore of the lake Laugen.

The 0.17-square-kilometre (42-acre) village has a population (2024) of 244 and a population density of 1,435 inhabitants per square kilometre (3,720/sq mi).
