= Børsa Municipality =

Former municipality in Trøndelag, Norway

Børsa Municipality Børsa herred
- Former municipality
- Børsen herred (historic name)
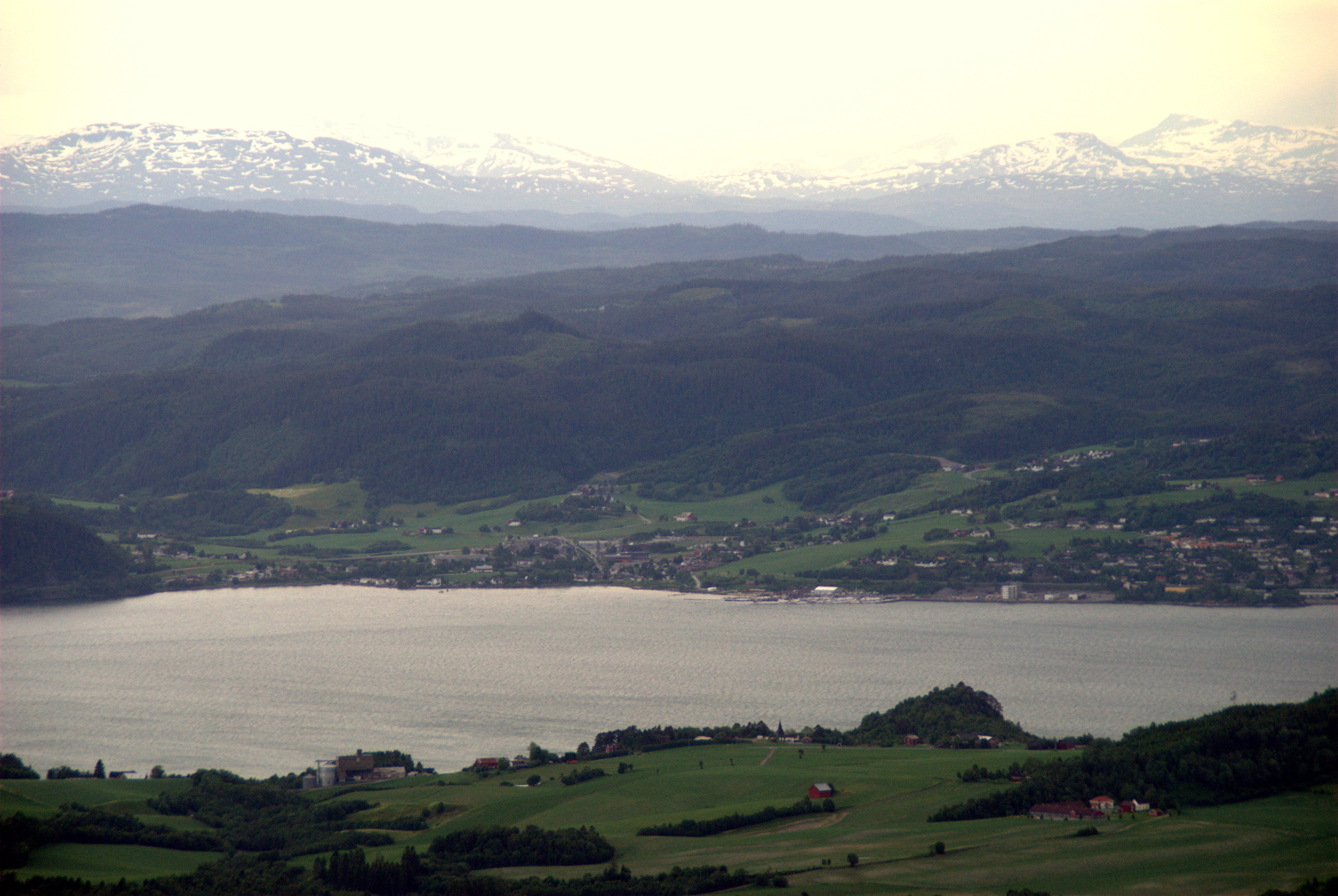
- View of the Børsa area

- Sør-Trøndelag within Norway

- Børsa within Sør-Trøndelag
- Coordinates: 63.3267°N 10.0692°E
- Country: Norway
- County: Sør-Trøndelag
- District: Orkdalen
- Established: 1 Jan 1838
  - Created as: Formannskapsdistrikt
- Disestablished: 1 Jan 1965
  - Succeeded by: Skaun Municipality
- Administrative centre: Børsa

Government
  - Mayor (1952–1964): Anders Høiseth (Sp)

Area (upon dissolution)
  - Total: 62.1 km^{2} (24.0 sq mi)
  - Rank: #460 in Norway
- Highest elevation: 445 m (1,460 ft)

Population (1964)
  - Total: 1,469
  - Rank: #455 in Norway
  - Density: 23.7/km^{2} (61/sq mi)
  - Change (10 years): ▼ −6.9%
- Demonym: Børsværing

Official language
  - Norwegian form: Neutral
- Time zone: UTC+01:00 (CET)
  - Summer (DST): UTC+02:00 (CEST)
- ISO 3166 code: NO-1658

Børsa is a former municipality in the old Sør-Trøndelag county, Norway. The 62.1-square-kilometre (24.0 sq mi) municipality existed from 1838 until its dissolution in 1965. The municipality originally encompassed the coastal areas along the Orkdalsfjorden and the Gaulosen in what is now Skaun Municipality and Orkland Municipality. The administrative centre was the village of Børsa where Børsa Church is located.

Prior to its dissolution in 1965, the 62.1-square-kilometre (24.0 sq mi) municipality was the 460th largest by area out of the 525 municipalities in Norway. Børsa Municipality was the 455th most populous municipality in Norway with a population of about 1,469. The municipality's population density was 23.7 inhabitants per square kilometre (61/sq mi) and its population had decreased by 6.9% over the previous 10-year period.

== General information ==
The parish of Børsa was established as a municipality on 1 January 1838 (see formannskapsdistrikt law). On 1 January 1890, the municipality was divided into two: Børseskognen Municipality (population: 1,410) in the south and Børsa Municipality (population: 2,300) in the north. On 1 January 1905, the area of northwest of the Orkdalsfjorden (population: 674) was separated to become the new Geitastrand Municipality and the area southeast of the fjord remained as Børsa Municipality with a population of 1,420. This shrunk Børsa Municipality from 180 square kilometres (69 sq mi) to only 62.1 square kilometres (24.0 sq mi).

During the 1960s, there were many municipal mergers across Norway due to the work of the Schei Committee. On 1 January 1965, Børsa Municipality (population: 1,476), Skaun Municipality (population: 1,251), and Buvik Municipality (population: 1,267) were merged to form a new, larger Skaun Municipality.

=== Name ===
The municipality (originally the parish) is named after local bay (Old Norse: Birgsi) that lies along the village of Børsa. The first element is a derivative of the word bjarg which means "cliff" or "rock". The last element is the suffix -si which has an uncertain meaning. Historically, the name of the municipality was spelled Børsen. On 3 November 1917, a royal resolution changed the spelling of the name of the municipality to Børsa.

=== Churches ===
The Church of Norway had one parish (sokn) within Børsa Municipality. At the time of the municipal dissolution, it was part of the Børsa prestegjeld and the Orkdal prosti (deanery) in the Diocese of Nidaros.

Churches in Børsa Municipality
Parish (sokn)	Church name	Location of the church	Year built
Børsa	Børsa Church	Børsa	1857

== Geography ==
The municipality was located along the Gaulosen/Orkdalsfjorden coast, about 25 kilometres (16 mi) southwest of the city of Trondheim. Orkanger Municipality and Orkdal Municipality were to the west, Skaun Municipality was to the south, and Buvik Municipality was to the east. The highest point in the municipality was the 445-metre (1,460 ft) tall mountain Våttån, on the border between Børsa Municipality and Buvik Municipality.

== Government ==
While it existed, Børsa Municipality was responsible for primary education (through 10th grade), outpatient health services, senior citizen services, welfare and other social services, zoning, economic development, and municipal roads and utilities. The municipality was governed by a municipal council of directly elected representatives. The mayor was indirectly elected by a vote of the municipal council. The municipality was under the jurisdiction of the Frostating Court of Appeal.

=== Municipal council ===
The municipal council (Herredsstyre) of Børsa Municipality was made up of representatives that were elected to four year terms. The tables below show the historical composition of the council by political party.

Børsa herredsstyre 1963–1964
Party name (in Norwegian)	Number of representatives
Labour Party (Arbeiderpartiet)	7
Conservative Party (Høyre)	2
Christian Democratic Party (Kristelig Folkeparti)	1
Centre Party (Senterpartiet)	6
Liberal Party (Venstre)	1
Total number of members:	17

Børsa herredsstyre 1959–1963
Party name (in Norwegian)	Number of representatives
Labour Party (Arbeiderpartiet)	8
Conservative Party (Høyre)	2
Christian Democratic Party (Kristelig Folkeparti)	1
Centre Party (Senterpartiet)	5
Liberal Party (Venstre)	1
Total number of members:	17

Børsa herredsstyre 1955–1959
Party name (in Norwegian)	Number of representatives
Labour Party (Arbeiderpartiet)	7
Conservative Party (Høyre)	2
Christian Democratic Party (Kristelig Folkeparti)	1
Farmers' Party (Bondepartiet)	6
Liberal Party (Venstre)	1
Total number of members:	17

Børsa herredsstyre 1951–1955
Party name (in Norwegian)	Number of representatives
Labour Party (Arbeiderpartiet)	6
Conservative Party (Høyre)	2
Christian Democratic Party (Kristelig Folkeparti)	1
Farmers' Party (Bondepartiet)	5
Liberal Party (Venstre)	2
Total number of members:	16

Børsa herredsstyre 1947–1951
Party name (in Norwegian)	Number of representatives
Labour Party (Arbeiderpartiet)	5
Conservative Party (Høyre)	2
Communist Party (Kommunistiske Parti)	1
Christian Democratic Party (Kristelig Folkeparti)	1
Farmers' Party (Bondepartiet)	5
Liberal Party (Venstre)	2
Total number of members:	16

Børsa herredsstyre 1945–1947
Party name (in Norwegian)	Number of representatives
Labour Party (Arbeiderpartiet)	5
Conservative Party (Høyre)	1
Communist Party (Kommunistiske Parti)	1
Christian Democratic Party (Kristelig Folkeparti)	1
Farmers' Party (Bondepartiet)	5
Liberal Party (Venstre)	3
Total number of members:	16

Børsa herredsstyre 1937–1941*
Party name (in Norwegian)	Number of representatives
Labour Party (Arbeiderpartiet)	5
Conservative Party (Høyre)	2
Farmers' Party (Bondepartiet)	6
Liberal Party (Venstre)	3
Total number of members:	16
Note: Due to the German occupation of Norway during World War II, no elections were held for new municipal councils until after the war ended in 1945.

=== Mayors ===
The mayor (Norwegian: ordfører) of Børsa Municipality was the political leader of the municipality and the chairperson of the municipal council. Here is a list of people who held this position:

- 1838–1839: Fredrik Christian Mosling
- 1840–1845: Anders Nilsen Liaklev
- 1846–1847: Erik Arntsen Einum
- 1848–1861: Henning Junghaus Kaurin
- 1862–1871: Erik Arntsen Einum
- 1872–1875: Ole Larsen Handberg
- 1876–1879: Erik Arntsen Einum (V)
- 1880–1881: Christian Høy Müller (H)
- 1882–1898: Enoch Wiggen (H)
- 1899–1904: Knud Moe (H)
- 1905–1922: Martin Handberg (H)
- 1923–1925: Peder Viggen (V)
- 1926–1928: Sivert Kufaas (V)
- 1929–1931: John J. Wiggen (Bp)
- 1932–1934: Ingebrigt Wiggen (Bp)
- 1935–1941: Peter Kjærem (Bp)
- 1941–1945: Ole Espås (NS)
- 1945–1945: Peter Kjærem (Bp)
- 1946–1951: Martinus Haugum (Bp)
- 1952–1964: Anders Høiseth (Bp)

== See also ==
- List of former municipalities of Norway
