= Skaun Municipality =

Municipality in Trøndelag, Norway

Skaun Municipality Skaun kommune
- Municipality
- Børseskognen herred (historic name)
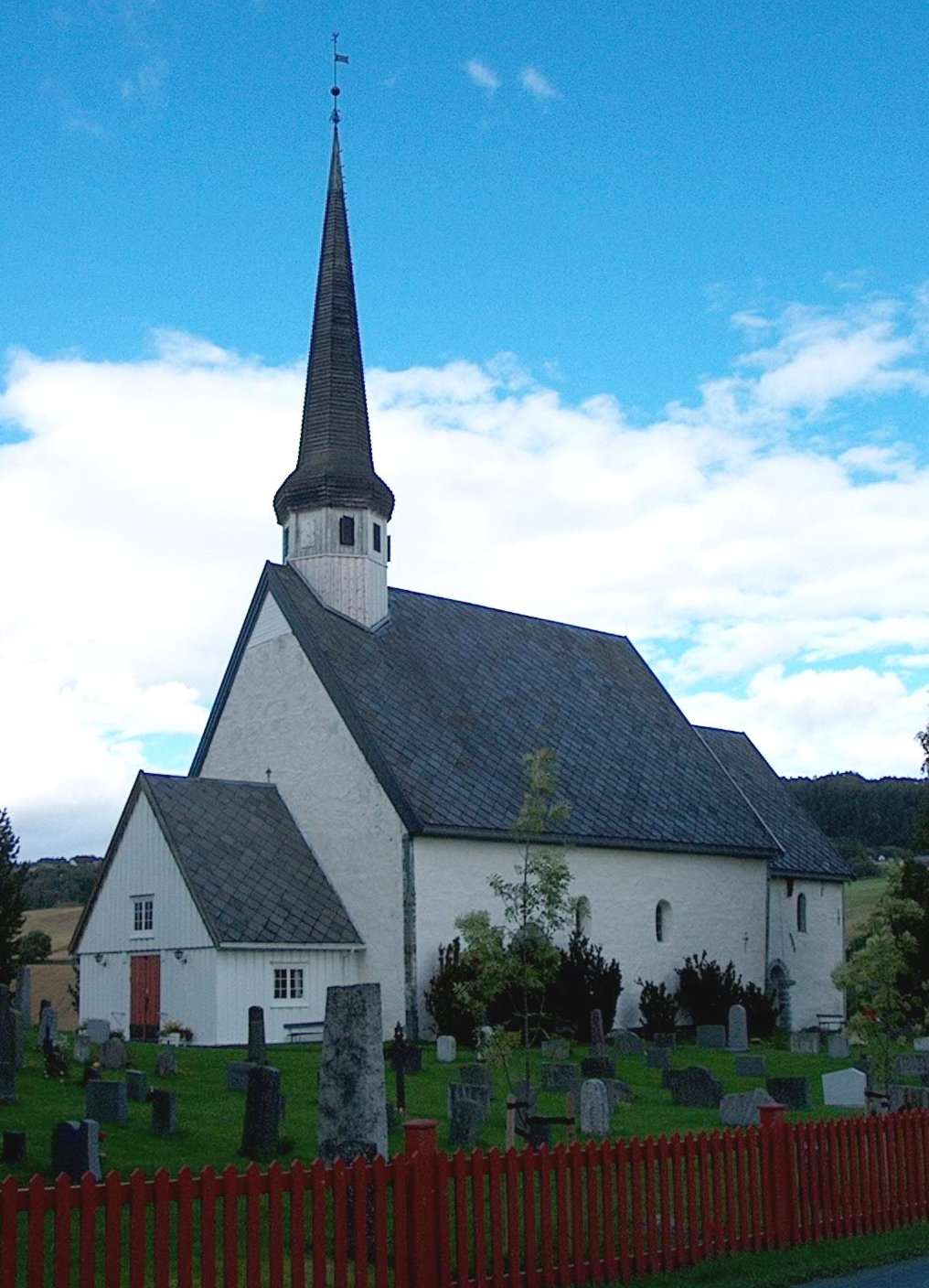
- View of the local Skaun Church

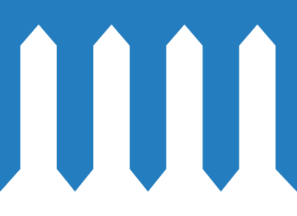
- Flag Coat of arms

- Trøndelag within Norway

- Skaun within Trøndelag
- Coordinates: 63°16′53″N 10°03′19″E
- Country: Norway
- County: Trøndelag
- District: Orkdalen
- Established: 1 Jan 1890
  - Preceded by: Børsa Municipality
- Administrative centre: Børsa

Government
  - Mayor (2023): Gunn Iversen Stokke (Sp)

Area
  - Total: 224.20 km^{2} (86.56 sq mi)
  - Land: 213.17 km^{2} (82.31 sq mi)
  - Water: 11.03 km^{2} (4.26 sq mi) 4.9%
  - Rank: #298 in Norway
- Highest elevation: 536.86 m (1,761.4 ft)

Population (2024)
  - Total: 8,484
  - Rank: #128 in Norway
  - Density: 37.8/km^{2} (98/sq mi)
  - Change (10 years): ▲ +14.8%
- Demonym: Skauning

Official language
  - Norwegian form: Neutral
- Time zone: UTC+01:00 (CET)
  - Summer (DST): UTC+02:00 (CEST)
- ISO 3166 code: NO-5029
- Website: Official website

Skaun is a municipality in Trøndelag county, Norway. It is part of the Orkdalen region. The administrative centre of the municipality is the village of Børsa. Other villages include Buvika, Eggkleiva, Melby, Skaun, and Viggja.

The 224-square-kilometre (86 sq mi) municipality is the 298th largest by area out of the 357 municipalities in Norway. Skaun Municipality is the 128th most populous municipality in Norway with a population of 8,484. The municipality's population density is 37.8 inhabitants per square kilometre (98/sq mi) and its population has increased by 14.8% over the previous 10-year period.

Skaun is predominantly rural, but is nonetheless situated only 25 kilometres (16 mi) from Norway's third largest city, Trondheim. Most inhabitants, except agricultural and public sector workers, work outside of the municipality in Trondheim, Orkanger, or Melhus. The European route E39 highway runs east to west across the northern part of the municipality and Norwegian County Road 709 runs north and south through the municipality.

== General information ==
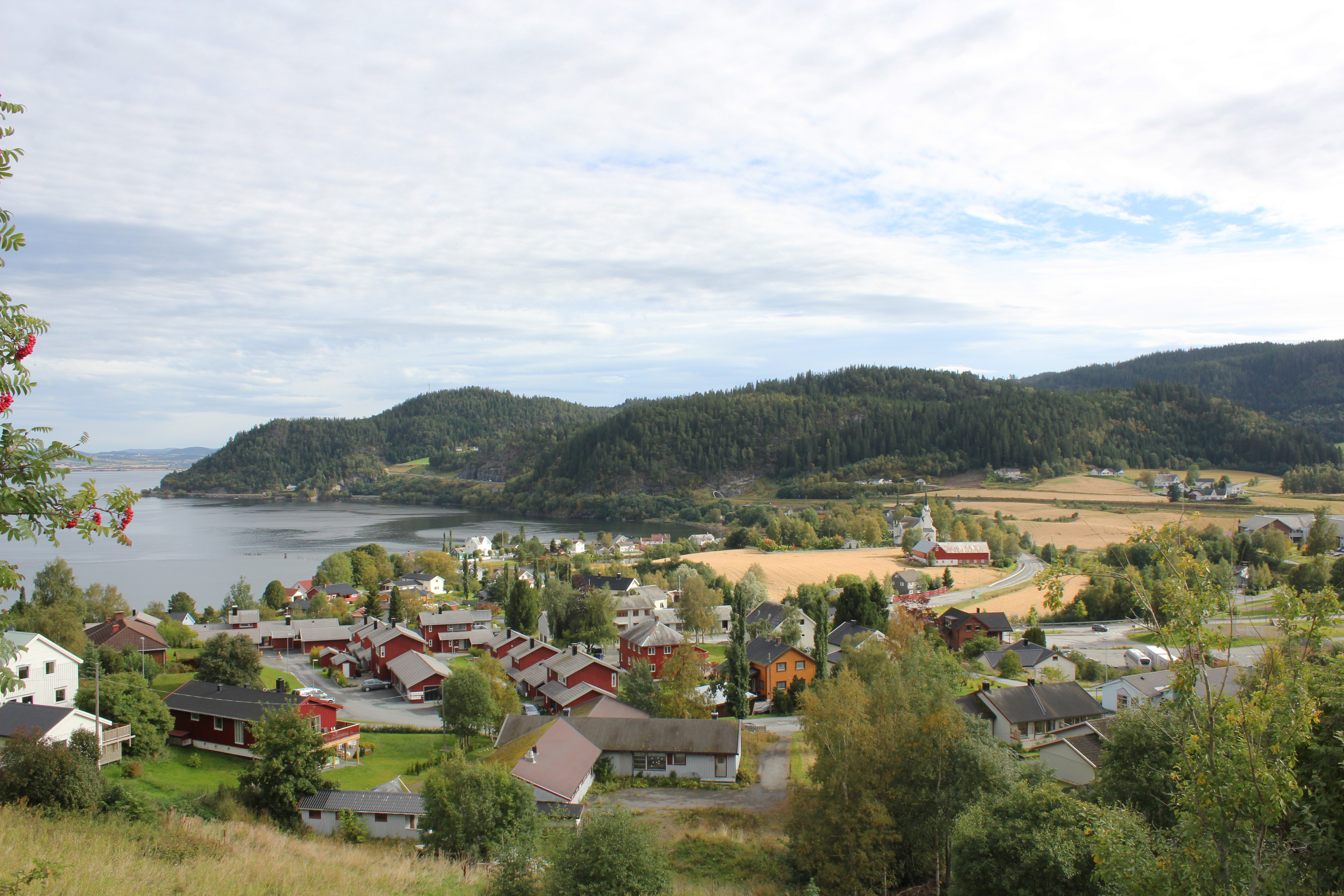
View of the municipal centre of Børsa

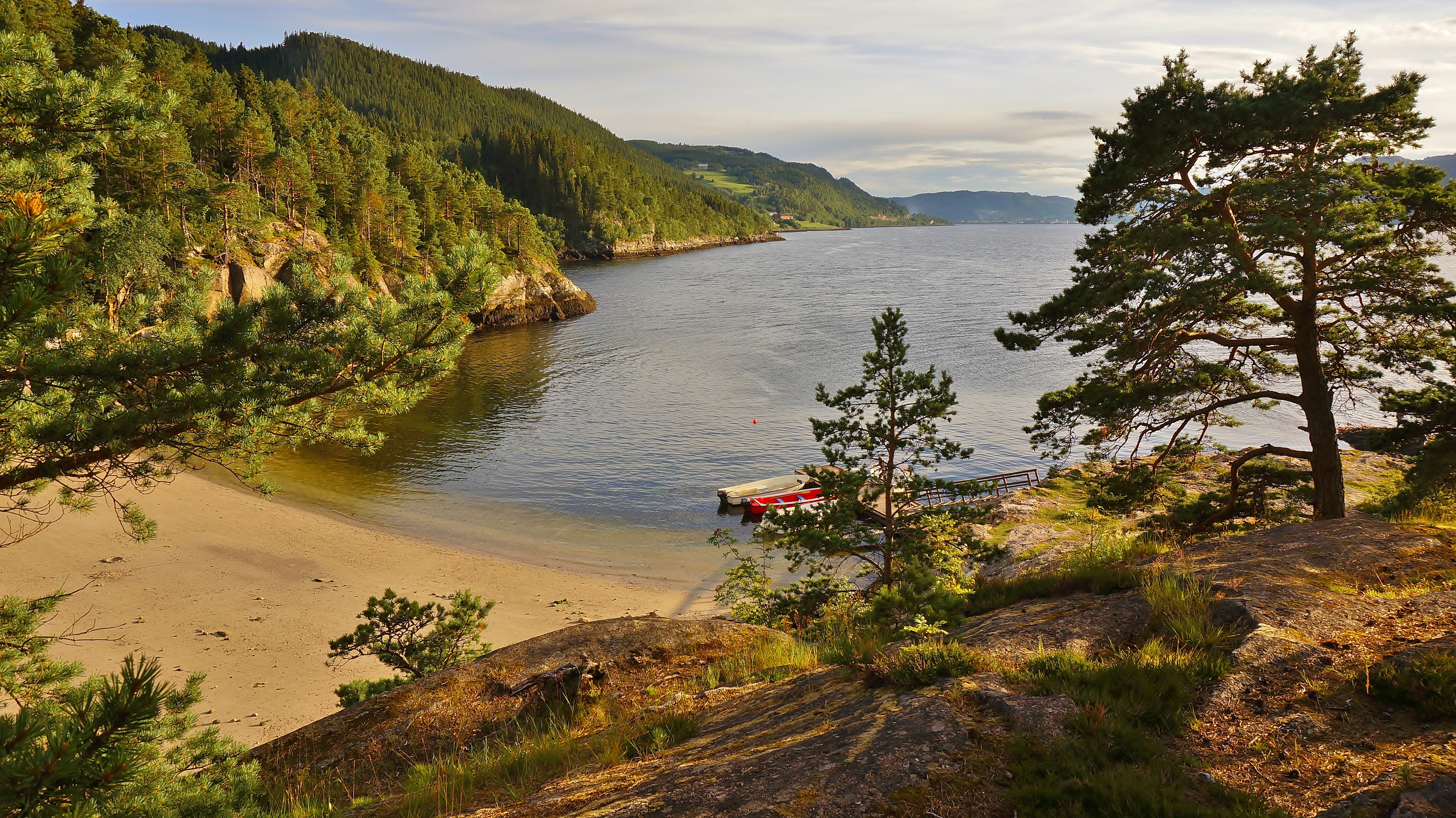
View of the northern shores of Skaun

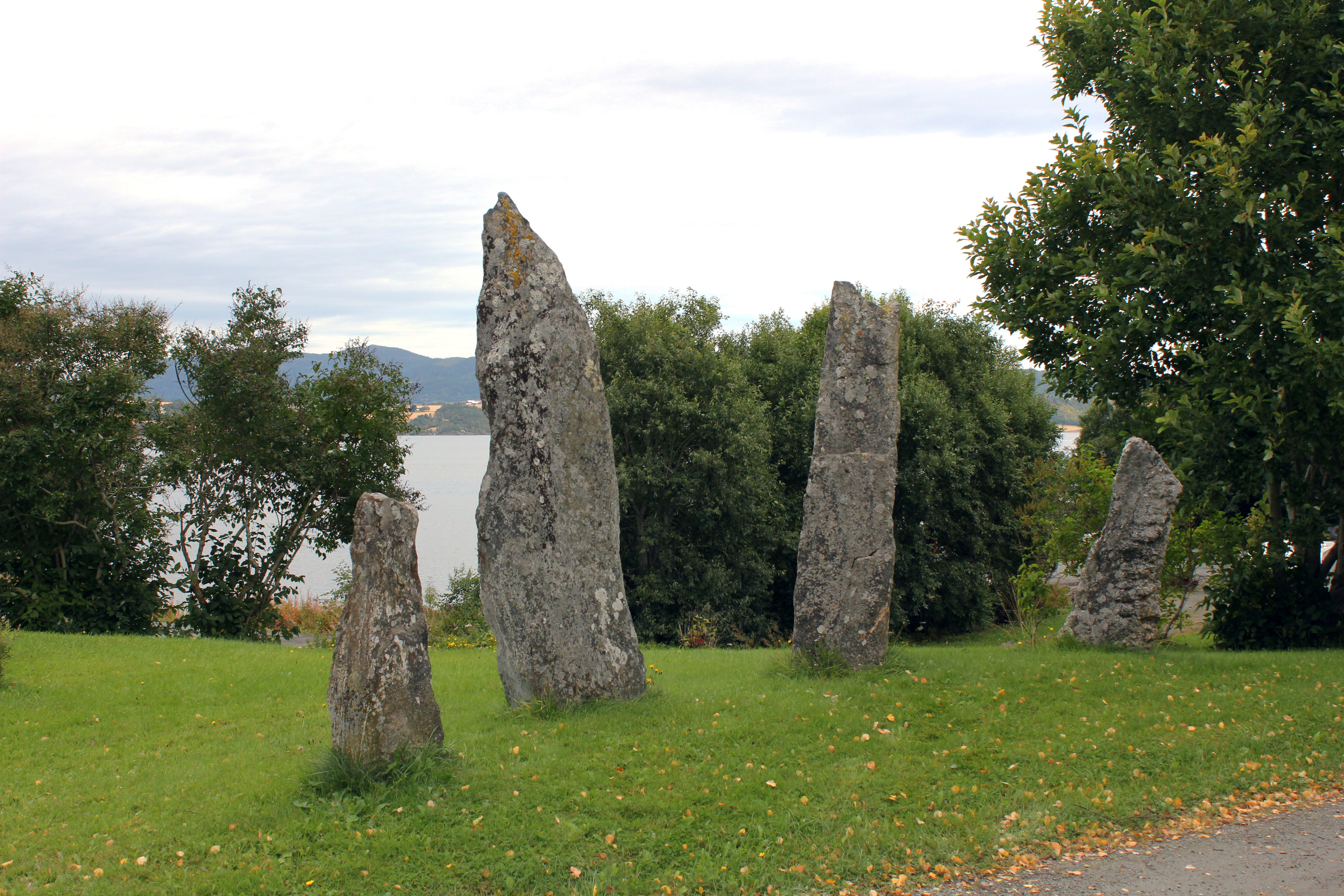
Stones that inspired the coat-of-arms of Skaun

The municipality of Børseskognen was established on 1 January 1890 when Børsa Municipality was divided into two: Børseskognen Municipality (population: 1,410) was in the south and a smaller Børsa Municipality (population: 2,300) in the north. In 1930, the name was changed to Skaun Municipality.

During the 1960s, there were many municipal mergers across Norway due to the work of the Schei Committee. On 1 January 1965, Skaun Municipality (population: 1,251), Børsa Municipality (population: 1,476), and Buvik Municipality (population: 1,267) were merged to form a new, larger Skaun Municipality.

On 1 January 2018, the municipality switched from the old Sør-Trøndelag county to the new Trøndelag county.

=== Name ===
The municipality was originally named Børsaskognen meaning "the forest of Børsa", referring to its more rural forested nature compared to the more built up area of the neighboring Børsa Municipality to the north. On 3 November 1917, a royal resolution changed the spelling of the name of the municipality to Børsaskogn, removing the definite form ending -en. On 13 October 1929, a royal resolution changed the name of the municipality to Skaun. This new name was chosen from the old Skaun farm (Old Norse: Skaun) since the first Skaun Church was built there. The name comes from the Old Norse word skinr which means "to shine". This is believed to refer to the lake Laugen.

=== Coat of arms ===
The coat of arms was granted on 9 January 1987. The official blazon is "Per fess urdy azure and argent" (Norwegian: Delt blått og sølv ved palisadesnitt). This means the arms have a field (background) that is divided by a line with an "urdy" design. The background below the line has a tincture of argent which means it is commonly colored white, but if it is made out of metal, then silver is used. The background above the line has a tincture of blue. The arms are designed to look like the four large, old standing stones found in the municipality. The four stones are most likely associated with a large grave site dating back to around 500-1000 AD. Local tradition states that these stones are where Einar Tambarskjelve moored his ships, and he owned a fort in Husaby in Skaun. The arms were designed by Einar H. Skjervold. The municipal flag has the same design as the coat of arms.

=== Churches ===
The Church of Norway has three parishes (sokn) within Skaun Municipality. It is part of the Orkdal prosti (deanery) in the Diocese of Nidaros.

Churches in Skaun Municipality
Parish (sokn)	Church name	Location of the church	Year built
Buvik	Buvik Church	Buvika	1819
Børsa	Børsa Church	Børsa	1857
Skaun	Skaun Church	Skaun	1183

== Geography ==
The municipality of Skaun lies on the south side of the Gaulosen, an arm of the Trondheimsfjord. The river Mora flows north into the lake Laugen and the river Børselva flows north out of the lake Laugen up to the fjord. The lake Malmsjøen is located in the southeastern part of the municipality. The highest point in the municipality is the 536.86-metre (1,761.4 ft) tall mountain Ølshøgda, a tripoint on the border with Melhus Municipality and Orkland Municipality.

Skaun has three neighboring municipalities: Orkland Municipality to the west, Melhus Municipality to the south and east, and Trondheim Municipality to the north across the Gaulosen.

== Government ==
Skaun Municipality are responsible for primary education (through 10th grade), outpatient health services, senior citizen services, welfare and other social services, zoning, economic development, and municipal roads and utilities. The municipality is governed by a municipal council of directly elected representatives. The mayor is indirectly elected by a vote of the municipal council. The municipality is under the jurisdiction of the Trøndelag District Court and the Frostating Court of Appeal. Waste management was from 1997 handled by the inter-municipal agency HAMOS Forvaltning. It merged into ReMidt in 2020.

=== Municipal council ===
The municipal council (Kommunestyre) of Skaun Municipality is made up of 23 representatives that are elected to four year terms. The tables below show the current and historical composition of the council by political party.

Skaun kommunestyre 2023–2027
Party name (in Norwegian)	Number of representatives
Labour Party (Arbeiderpartiet)	5
Progress Party (Fremskrittspartiet)	2
Conservative Party (Høyre)	4
Christian Democratic Party (Kristelig Folkeparti)	1
Centre Party (Senterpartiet)	6
Socialist Left Party (Sosialistisk Venstreparti)	2
Buvik List (Buviklista)	3
Total number of members:	23

Skaun kommunestyre 2019–2024
Party name (in Norwegian)	Number of representatives
Labour Party (Arbeiderpartiet)	6
Progress Party (Fremskrittspartiet)	1
Green Party (Miljøpartiet De Grønne)	1
Conservative Party (Høyre)	3
Christian Democratic Party (Kristelig Folkeparti)	1
Centre Party (Senterpartiet)	8
Socialist Left Party (Sosialistisk Venstreparti)	1
Buvik List (Buviklista)	2
Total number of members:	23

Skaun kommunestyre 2015–2019
Party name (in Norwegian)	Number of representatives
Labour Party (Arbeiderpartiet)	7
Progress Party (Fremskrittspartiet)	2
Conservative Party (Høyre)	2
Centre Party (Senterpartiet)	8
Socialist Left Party (Sosialistisk Venstreparti)	1
Joint list of the Liberal Party (Venstre) and Christian Democratic Party (Kristelig Folkeparti)	1
Buvik List (Buviklista)	2
Total number of members:	23

Skaun kommunestyre 2011–2015
Party name (in Norwegian)	Number of representatives
Labour Party (Arbeiderpartiet)	6
Progress Party (Fremskrittspartiet)	2
Conservative Party (Høyre)	3
Christian Democratic Party (Kristelig Folkeparti)	1
Centre Party (Senterpartiet)	6
Socialist Left Party (Sosialistisk Venstreparti)	1
Buvik List (Buviklista)	2
Total number of members:	21

Skaun kommunestyre 2007–2011
Party name (in Norwegian)	Number of representatives
Labour Party (Arbeiderpartiet)	4
Progress Party (Fremskrittspartiet)	3
Conservative Party (Høyre)	2
Christian Democratic Party (Kristelig Folkeparti)	1
Centre Party (Senterpartiet)	5
Socialist Left Party (Sosialistisk Venstreparti)	1
Liberal Party (Venstre)	1
Buvik List (Buviklista)	4
Total number of members:	21

Skaun kommunestyre 2003–2007
Party name (in Norwegian)	Number of representatives
Labour Party (Arbeiderpartiet)	4
Progress Party (Fremskrittspartiet)	2
Conservative Party (Høyre)	1
Christian Democratic Party (Kristelig Folkeparti)	1
Centre Party (Senterpartiet)	6
Socialist Left Party (Sosialistisk Venstreparti)	3
Liberal Party (Venstre)	1
Buvik List (Buviklista)	3
Total number of members:	21

Skaun kommunestyre 1999–2003
Party name (in Norwegian)	Number of representatives
Labour Party (Arbeiderpartiet)	9
Progress Party (Fremskrittspartiet)	1
Conservative Party (Høyre)	2
Christian Democratic Party (Kristelig Folkeparti)	2
Centre Party (Senterpartiet)	7
Socialist Left Party (Sosialistisk Venstreparti)	2
Liberal Party (Venstre)	Local list
Total number of members:	21

Skaun kommunestyre 1995–1999
Party name (in Norwegian)	Number of representatives
Labour Party (Arbeiderpartiet)	8
Conservative Party (Høyre)	2
Christian Democratic Party (Kristelig Folkeparti)	2
Centre Party (Senterpartiet)	9
Socialist Left Party (Sosialistisk Venstreparti)	1
Liberal Party (Venstre)	1
Buvik local list (Buvikfolkets egen list)	6
Total number of members:	29

Skaun kommunestyre 1991–1995
Party name (in Norwegian)	Number of representatives
Labour Party (Arbeiderpartiet)	7
Conservative Party (Høyre)	2
Christian Democratic Party (Kristelig Folkeparti)	2
Centre Party (Senterpartiet)	9
Socialist Left Party (Sosialistisk Venstreparti)	2
Liberal Party (Venstre)	1
Buvik local list (Buvikfolkets egen liste)	6
Total number of members:	29

Skaun kommunestyre 1987–1991
Party name (in Norwegian)	Number of representatives
Labour Party (Arbeiderpartiet)	13
Progress Party (Fremskrittspartiet)	2
Conservative Party (Høyre)	4
Christian Democratic Party (Kristelig Folkeparti)	1
Centre Party (Senterpartiet)	7
Socialist Left Party (Sosialistisk Venstreparti)	1
Liberal Party (Venstre)	1
Total number of members:	29

Skaun kommunestyre 1983–1987
Party name (in Norwegian)	Number of representatives
Labour Party (Arbeiderpartiet)	12
Progress Party (Fremskrittspartiet)	1
Conservative Party (Høyre)	4
Christian Democratic Party (Kristelig Folkeparti)	2
Liberal People's Party (Liberale Folkepartiet)	1
Centre Party (Senterpartiet)	6
Socialist Left Party (Sosialistisk Venstreparti)	2
Liberal Party (Venstre)	1
Total number of members:	29

Skaun kommunestyre 1979–1983
Party name (in Norwegian)	Number of representatives
Labour Party (Arbeiderpartiet)	11
Conservative Party (Høyre)	4
Christian Democratic Party (Kristelig Folkeparti)	3
New People's Party (Nye Folkepartiet)	1
Centre Party (Senterpartiet)	8
Socialist Left Party (Sosialistisk Venstreparti)	1
Liberal Party (Venstre)	1
Total number of members:	29

Skaun kommunestyre 1975–1979
Party name (in Norwegian)	Number of representatives
Labour Party (Arbeiderpartiet)	10
Conservative Party (Høyre)	3
Christian Democratic Party (Kristelig Folkeparti)	3
New People's Party (Nye Folkepartiet)	2
Centre Party (Senterpartiet)	9
Socialist Left Party (Sosialistisk Venstreparti)	1
Liberal Party (Venstre)	1
Total number of members:	29

Skaun kommunestyre 1971–1975
Party name (in Norwegian)	Number of representatives
Labour Party (Arbeiderpartiet)	13
Conservative Party (Høyre)	2
Christian Democratic Party (Kristelig Folkeparti)	2
Centre Party (Senterpartiet)	9
Liberal Party (Venstre)	3
Total number of members:	29

Skaun kommunestyre 1967–1971
Party name (in Norwegian)	Number of representatives
Labour Party (Arbeiderpartiet)	11
Conservative Party (Høyre)	2
Christian Democratic Party (Kristelig Folkeparti)	2
Centre Party (Senterpartiet)	9
Liberal Party (Venstre)	3
Local List(s) (Lokale lister)	2
Total number of members:	29

Skaun kommunestyre 1963–1967
Party name (in Norwegian)	Number of representatives
Labour Party (Arbeiderpartiet)	4
Christian Democratic Party (Kristelig Folkeparti)	3
Centre Party (Senterpartiet)	7
Liberal Party (Venstre)	3
Total number of members:	17

Skaun herredsstyre 1959–1963
Party name (in Norwegian)	Number of representatives
Labour Party (Arbeiderpartiet)	3
Christian Democratic Party (Kristelig Folkeparti)	3
Centre Party (Senterpartiet)	7
Liberal Party (Venstre)	4
Total number of members:	17

Skaun herredsstyre 1955–1959
Party name (in Norwegian)	Number of representatives
Labour Party (Arbeiderpartiet)	3
Christian Democratic Party (Kristelig Folkeparti)	2
Farmers' Party (Bondepartiet)	7
Liberal Party (Venstre)	5
Total number of members:	17

Skaun herredsstyre 1951–1955
Party name (in Norwegian)	Number of representatives
Labour Party (Arbeiderpartiet)	2
Christian Democratic Party (Kristelig Folkeparti)	3
Farmers' Party (Bondepartiet)	6
Liberal Party (Venstre)	5
Total number of members:	16

Skaun herredsstyre 1947–1951
Party name (in Norwegian)	Number of representatives
Labour Party (Arbeiderpartiet)	3
Joint List(s) of Non-Socialist Parties (Borgerlige Felleslister)	13
Total number of members:	16

Skaun herredsstyre 1945–1947
Party name (in Norwegian)	Number of representatives
Labour Party (Arbeiderpartiet)	2
Local List(s) (Lokale lister)	14
Total number of members:	16

Skaun herredsstyre 1937–1941*
Party name (in Norwegian)	Number of representatives
Labour Party (Arbeiderpartiet)	2
Joint List(s) of Non-Socialist Parties (Borgerlige Felleslister)	14
Total number of members:	16
Note: Due to the German occupation of Norway during World War II, no elections were held for new municipal councils until after the war ended in 1945.

=== Mayors ===
The mayor (Norwegian: ordfører) of Skaun Municipality is the political leader of the municipality and the chairperson of the municipal council. Here is a list of people who have held this position:

- 1890–1893: Knud Moe (H/MV)
- 1894–1904: Anders A. Krokstad (V)
- 1905–1910: Anders O. Rø (V)
- 1911–1916: Anders A. Krokstad (V)
- 1917–1922: Enok Eidsmo (V)
- 1923–1925: Anders O. Rø (V)
- 1926–1928: Ole L. Lien (Bp)
- 1929–1934: Ola Mehlum (V)
- 1935–1937: Ole L. Lien (Bp)
- 1938–1940: Ola Mehlum (V)
- 1940–1941: Ole L. Lien (Bp)
- 1942–1945: Johan Belsvik (NS)
- 1945–1945: Ola Mehlum (V)
- 1946–1959: Petter Mellingsæter (V)
- 1960–1967: Anders Morken (KrF)
- 1968–1971: Jarle Rekstad (Sp)
- 1972–1975: Bjarne Saltnes (Ap)
- 1976–1979: Paul Opland (Sp)
- 1980–1981: Leif Hammertrø (Sp)
- 1982–1983: Steinar Mo (H)
- 1984–1987: Bjarne Saltnes (Ap)
- 1988–1995: Agnar Melby (Sp)
- 1995–2003: Asbjørn Leraand (Ap)
- 2003–2019: Jon P. Husby (Sp)
- 2019–2023: Gunn Iversen Stokke (Sp)
- 2023–present: Tove Sommerschild (Ap)

== Notable people ==
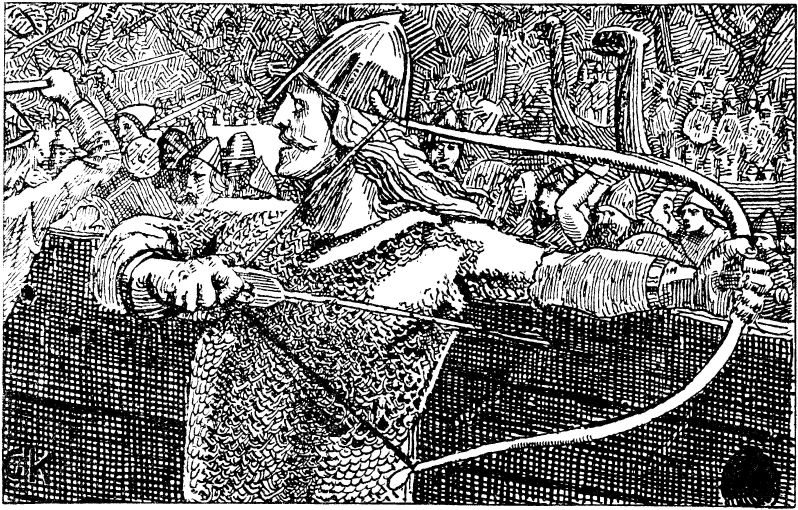
Einar Tambarskjelve

- Einar Tambarskjelve (ca.980–ca.1050), the Viking who according to legend used the four monumental standing stones in Børsa to moor his boats (the stones are the theme for the coat of arms)
- Egil Aarvik (1912 in Børsa – 1990), a newspaper editor, author, and politician
- Bjarne Saltnes (1934 in Skaun – 2016), a politician and Mayor of Skaun from 1971–1975 and 1979–1983
- Jostein Wilmann (born 1953 in Viggja), a former professional road racing cyclist who was the best placed Norwegian in the Tour de France
- Kari Aalvik Grimsbø (born 1985), a goalkeeper for the Norway women's national handball team

=== Fictional residents ===
- Kristin Lavransdatter, who was the key character in a trilogy written by the Nobel Prize winner in literature, Sigrid Undset. There is a celebration of this every year the second week-end in August. It takes place at Husaby, where Sigrid Undset lived while writing the second book, Husfrue ("Houselady"). The books also have large parts of their storyline from Husaby.
