= Skaun Church =

Church in Trøndelag, Norway

- Skaun kirke
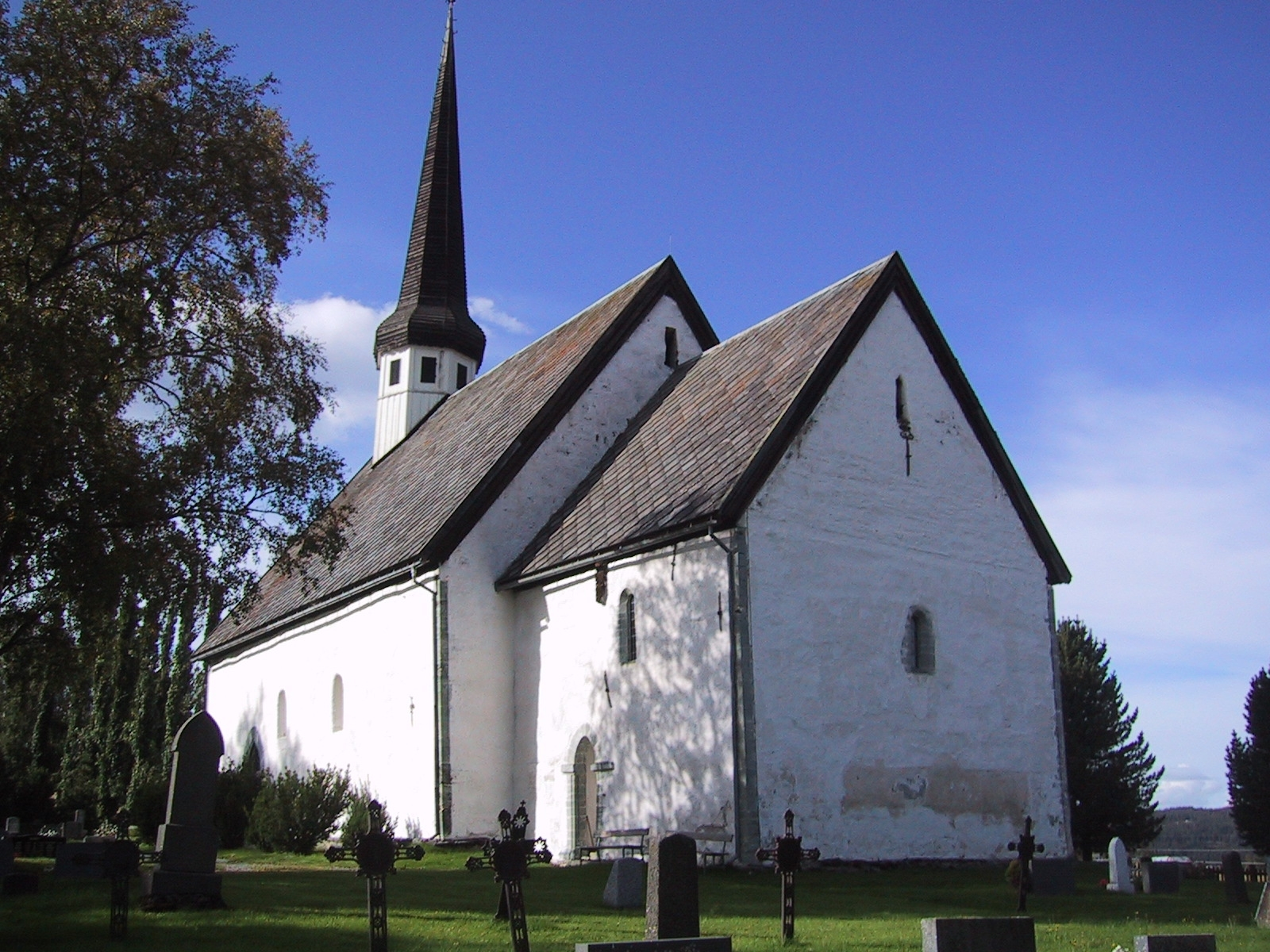
- View of the church
- Skaun Church
- 63°15′04″N 10°03′05″E
- Location: Skaun Municipality, Trøndelag
- Country: Norway
- Denomination: Church of Norway
- Previous denomination: Catholic Church
- Churchmanship: Evangelical Lutheran

History
- Former name: Venn kirke
- Status: Parish church
- Founded: c. 1170
- Consecrated: c. 1190

Architecture
- Functional status: Active
- Architectural type: Long church
- Style: Gothic
- Completed: c. 1190 (836 years ago)

Specifications
- Capacity: 250
- Materials: Stone

Administration
- Diocese: Nidaros bispedømme
- Deanery: Orkdal prosti
- Parish: Skaun
- Norwegian Cultural Heritage Site
- Type: Church
- Status: Automatically protected
- ID: 85449

Skaun Church (Norwegian: Skaun kirke, historically: Venn kirke) is a parish church of the Church of Norway in Skaun Municipality in Trøndelag county, Norway. It is located in the village of Skaun. It is the church for the Skaun parish which is part of the Orkdal prosti (deanery) in the Diocese of Nidaros. The white, stone church was built in a long church style in the year 1183 and designed by an unknown architect. The church seats about 250 people.

== History ==
The earliest existing historical records of the church date back to the year 1533, but the church was built long before that time. The church was likely established in the late 12th century with construction beginning around the year 1170 and work taking about 20 to 30 years to complete. The church was likely completed and in use by the year 1200. The altarpiece of oak dates from the late 1100s. The church is made out of stone with a wooden roof. Sometime during the second half of the 13th century, the roof was replaced or rebuilt. In 1649, a new tower was constructed on the roof. The pulpit was sculpted in 1665. The church bell dates from 1754. In 1855, a church porch was constructed as part of the main entrance to the church. In 1949, the church porch was rebuilt.

== Media gallery ==
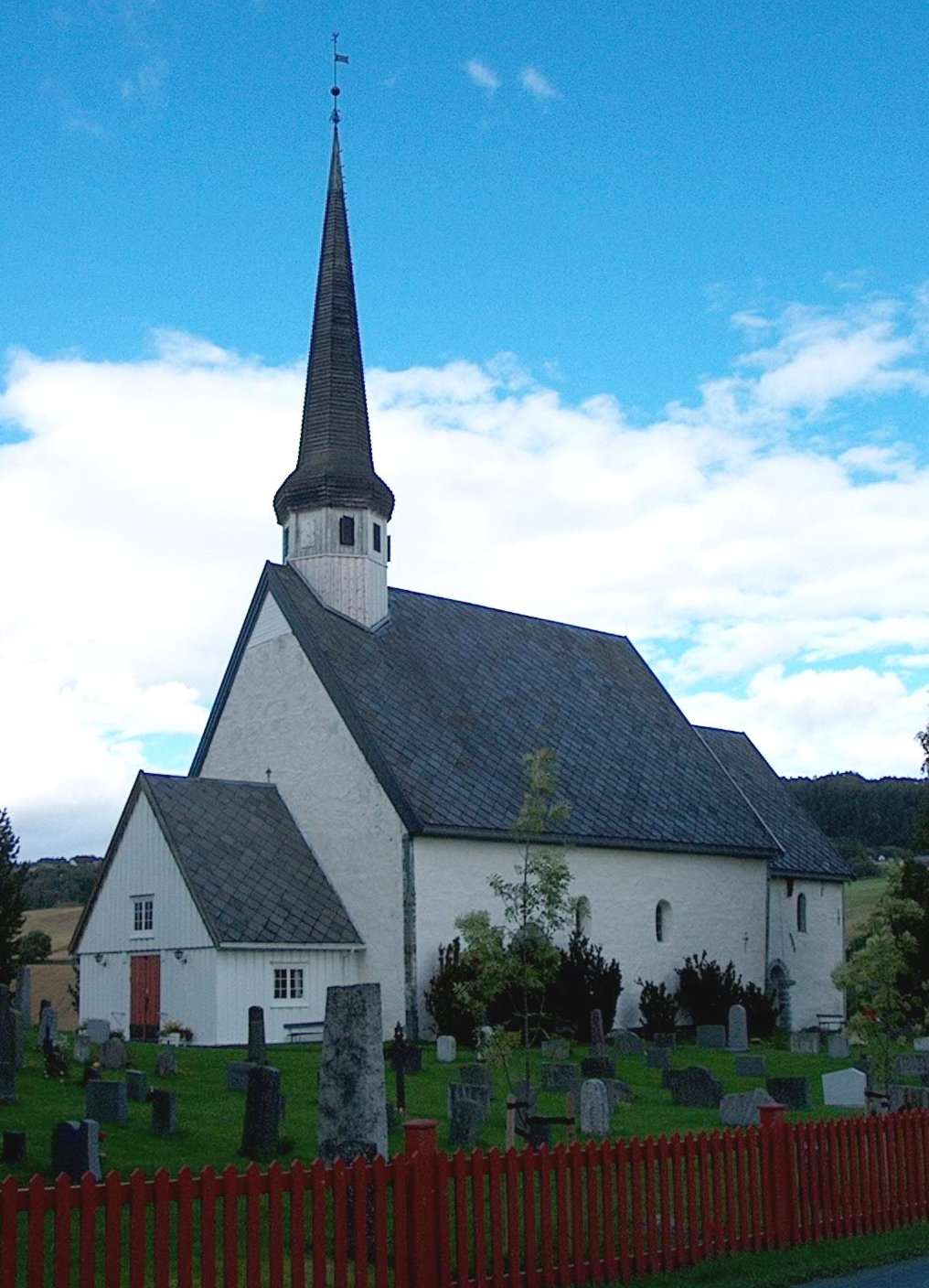
Skaun Church

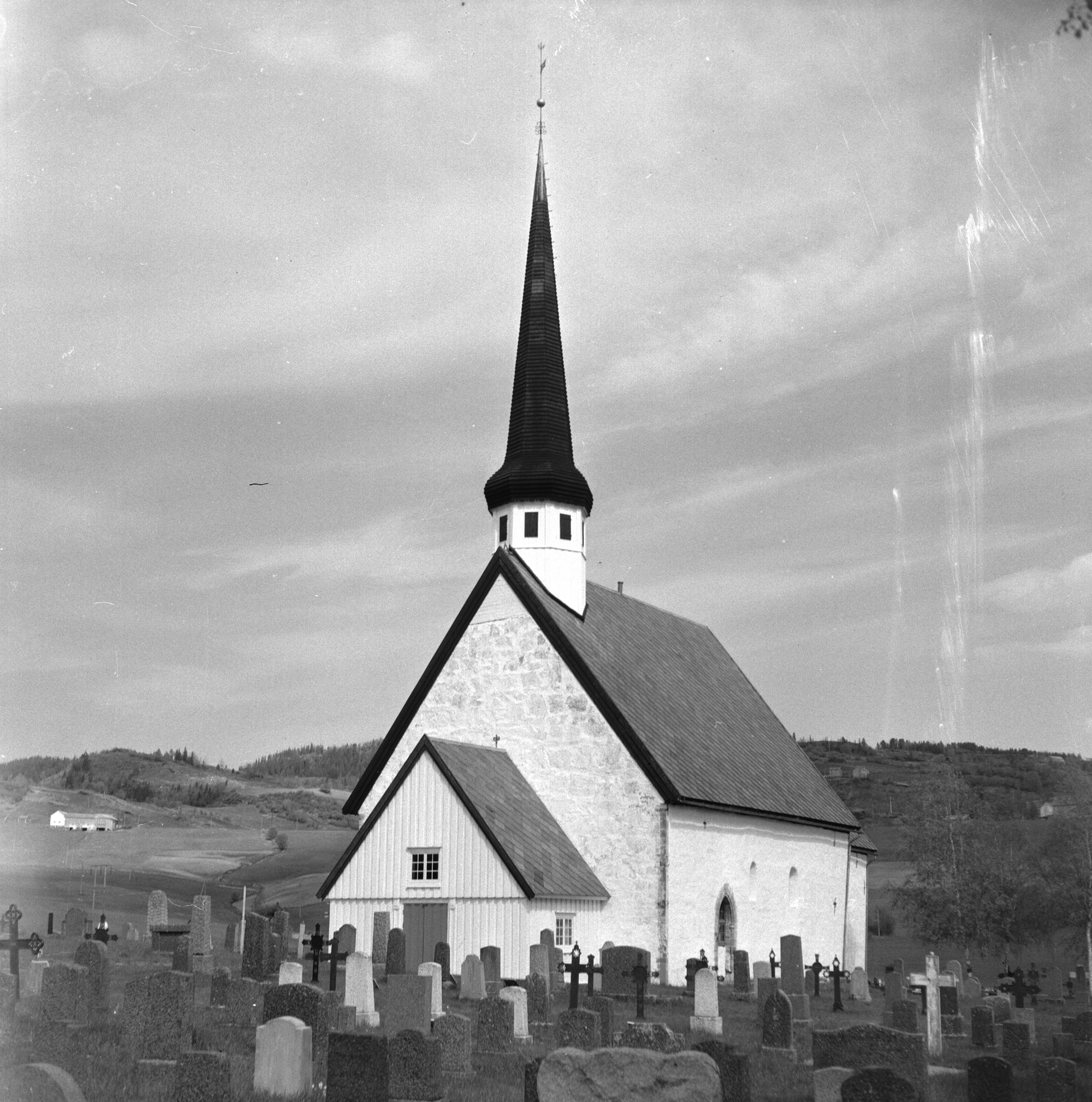
Exterior view (1958)

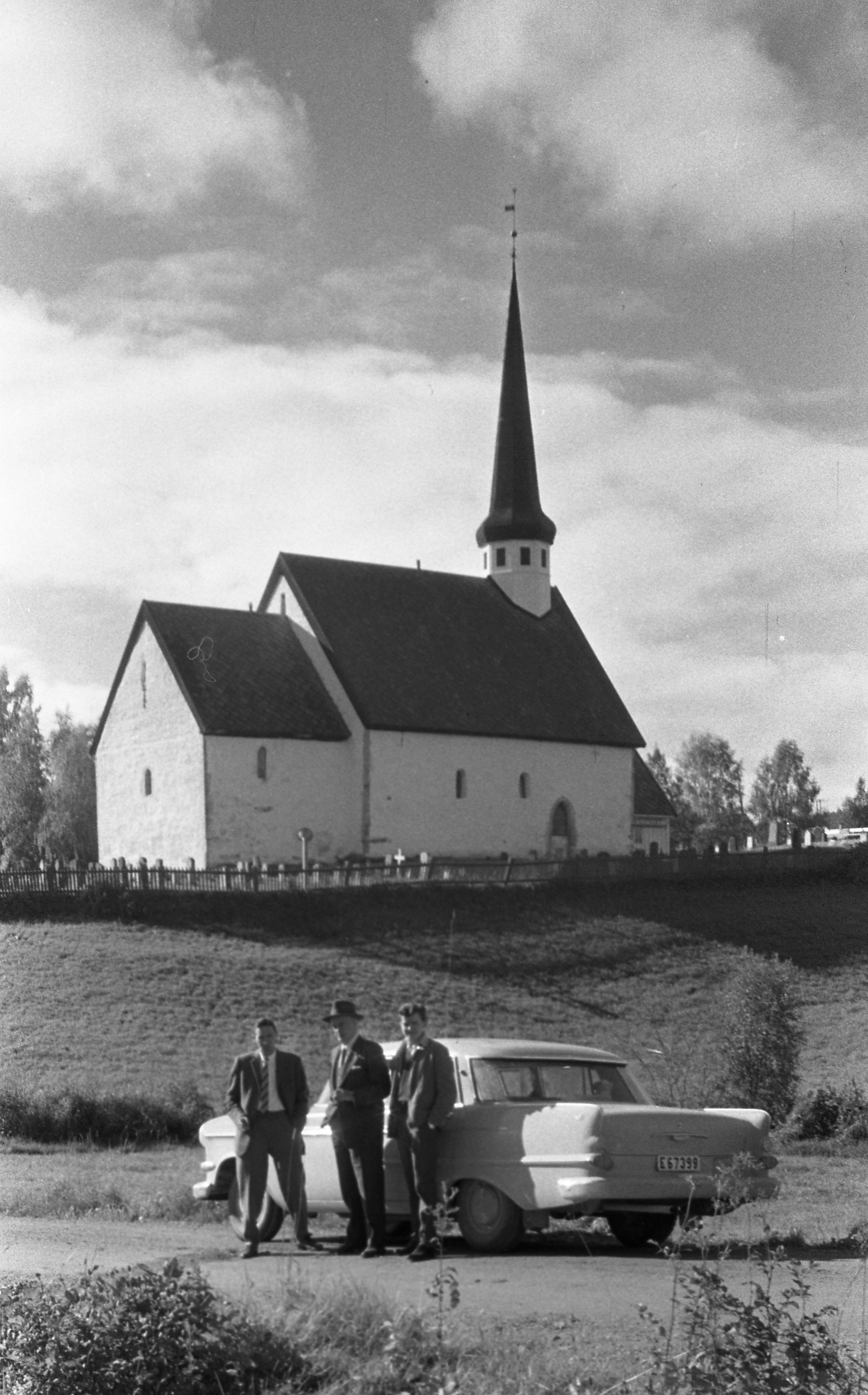
Skaun Church. circa 1961

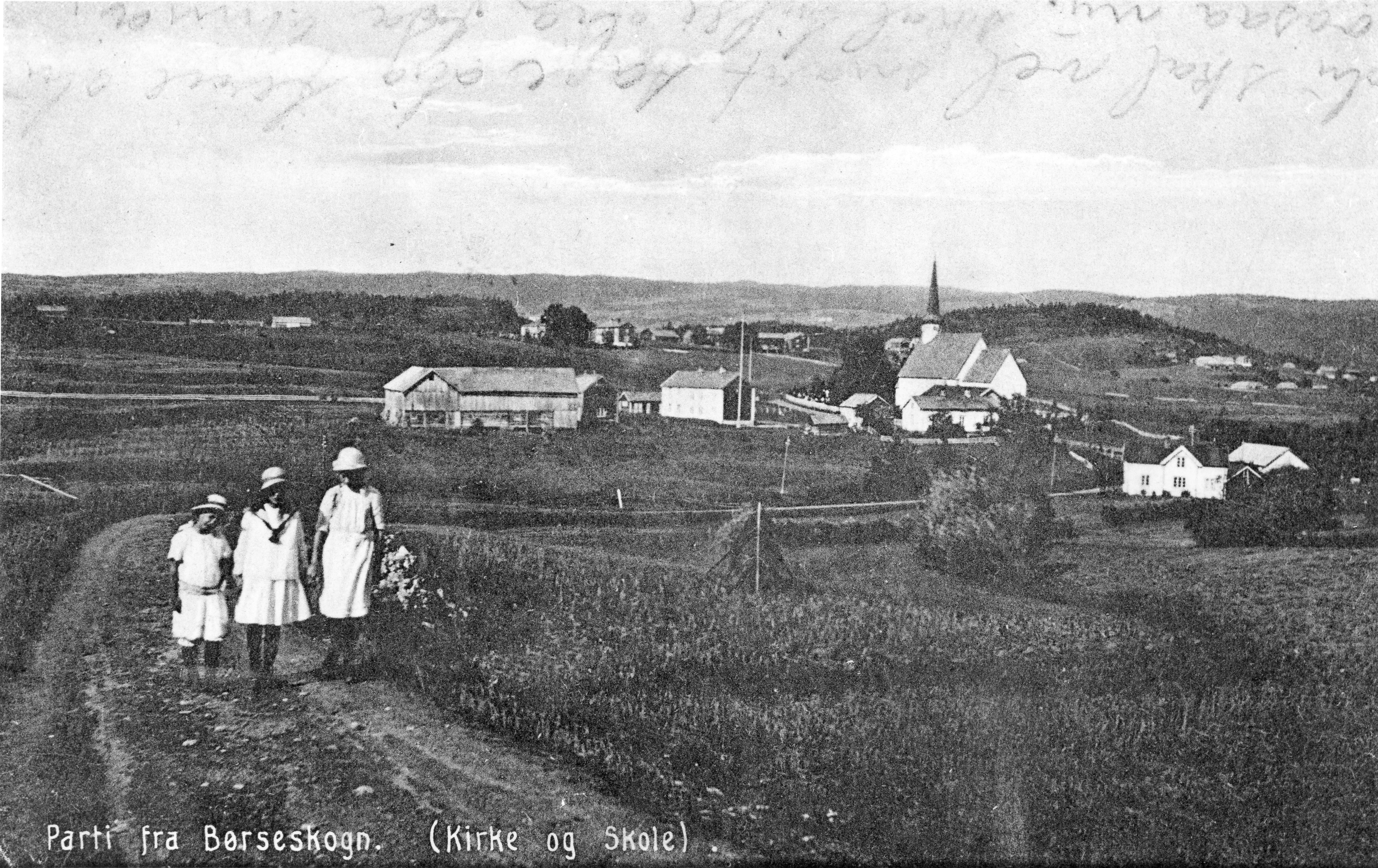
Skaun Church and school. circa 1920

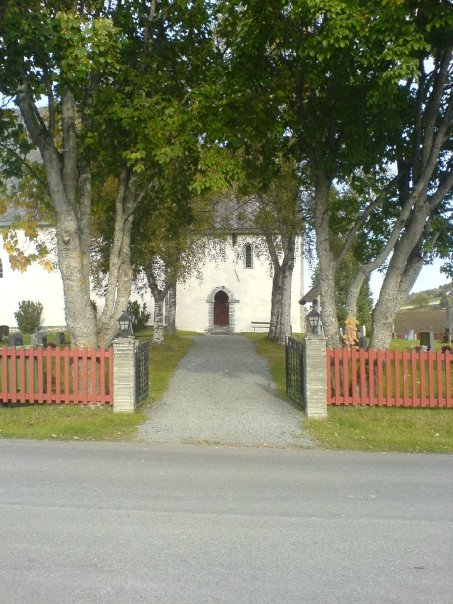
Entrance portal

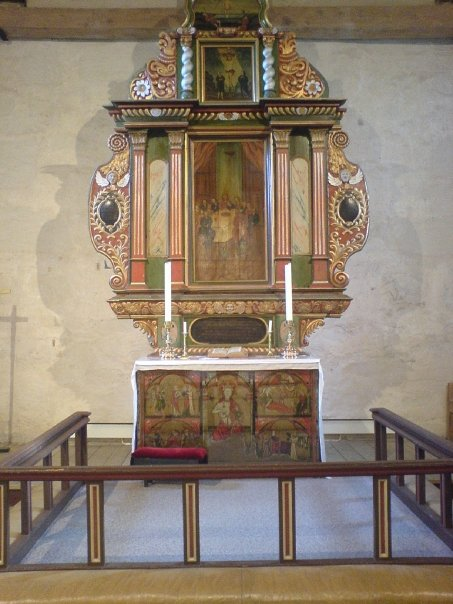
Altarpiece

== See also ==
- List of churches in Nidaros
