= Borsa Brown =

Hungarian author

- Born: 16 November 1975 (age 50); Vác, Hungary
- Occupation: Writer
- Writing career
- Period: 2013–present
- Genres: Romantic, erotic
- Notable works: In the Mafia's Bed; The Arab
- Website: www.facebook.com/borsabrown75/

Borsa Brown (born 16 November 1975 in Vác) is the pseudonym of Erzsébet Szobonya, a Hungarian novelist.

== Biography ==
Szobonya went to school in Vác, a town in Pest county, Hungary. After graduation, she became a middle manager of a multinational company. After the birth of her second child, she started a family business.

Her online articles started to appear thereafter, mainly addressing themes of maternity and feminine identity.

Her first book In the mafia's bed (A maffia ágyában) was published in 2013. It was followed by two volumes in 2014: The embrace of the Mafia (A maffia ölelésében) and In the heart of the Mafia (A maffia szívében).

In 2015, she became well known to the public with a novel called The Arab (Az Arab). It was nominated for the Book of the Year award.

The novel became a series of five volumes: The Arab (Az Arab), The Arab's Lover (Az Arab szeretője), The Arab's Daughter Vol. 1 (Az Arab lánya I.), The Arab's Daughter Vol. 2 (Az Arab lánya II.), and The Arab's Son (Az Arab fia).

== Books ==
- In the Mafia's bed (A maffia ágyában) (2013)
- In the Mafia's Embrace (A maffia ölelésében) (2014)
- In the Mafia's Heart (A maffia szívében)(2014)
- The Arab (Az Arab) (2015)
- The Arab's Lover (Az Arab szeretője) (2016)
- The Arab's daughter I. (Az Arab lánya I.) (2016)
- The Arab's daughter II. (AZ Arab lánya II.) (2017)
- The Arab's son (Az Arab fia) (2017)
- In the Mafia's bed extended edition (A maffia ágyában, bővített kiadás) (2016)
- In the Mafia's embrace extended edition (A maffia ölelésében, bővített kiadás) (2016)
- In the Mafia's heart extended edition (A maffia szívében, bővített kiadás) (2017)
- The husband's prostitute (A férj prostija) (2018)
- Shame and Faith 1 (Gyalázat és hit 1) (2018)
- Shame and Love 2 (Gyalázat és szerelem 2) (2019)
- Shame and Passion 3 (Gyalázat és szenvedély) (2019)
- Sapho 1 (Sapho 1) (20...)
- Sapho 2 (Sapho 2) (20...)
- Sardinian Rock (A szárd szikla) (2020)

== Awards and honours ==
- Gold book nomination (2014)
- Gold book nomination (2015)
- Book of the Year main prize by the votes of the audience with 'The Arabic' novel (2015)
- Gold book awarded, second place (2016)
