= Buvik Municipality =

Former municipality in Trøndelag, Norway

Buvik Municipality Buvik herred
- Former municipality
- Buviken herred (historic name)
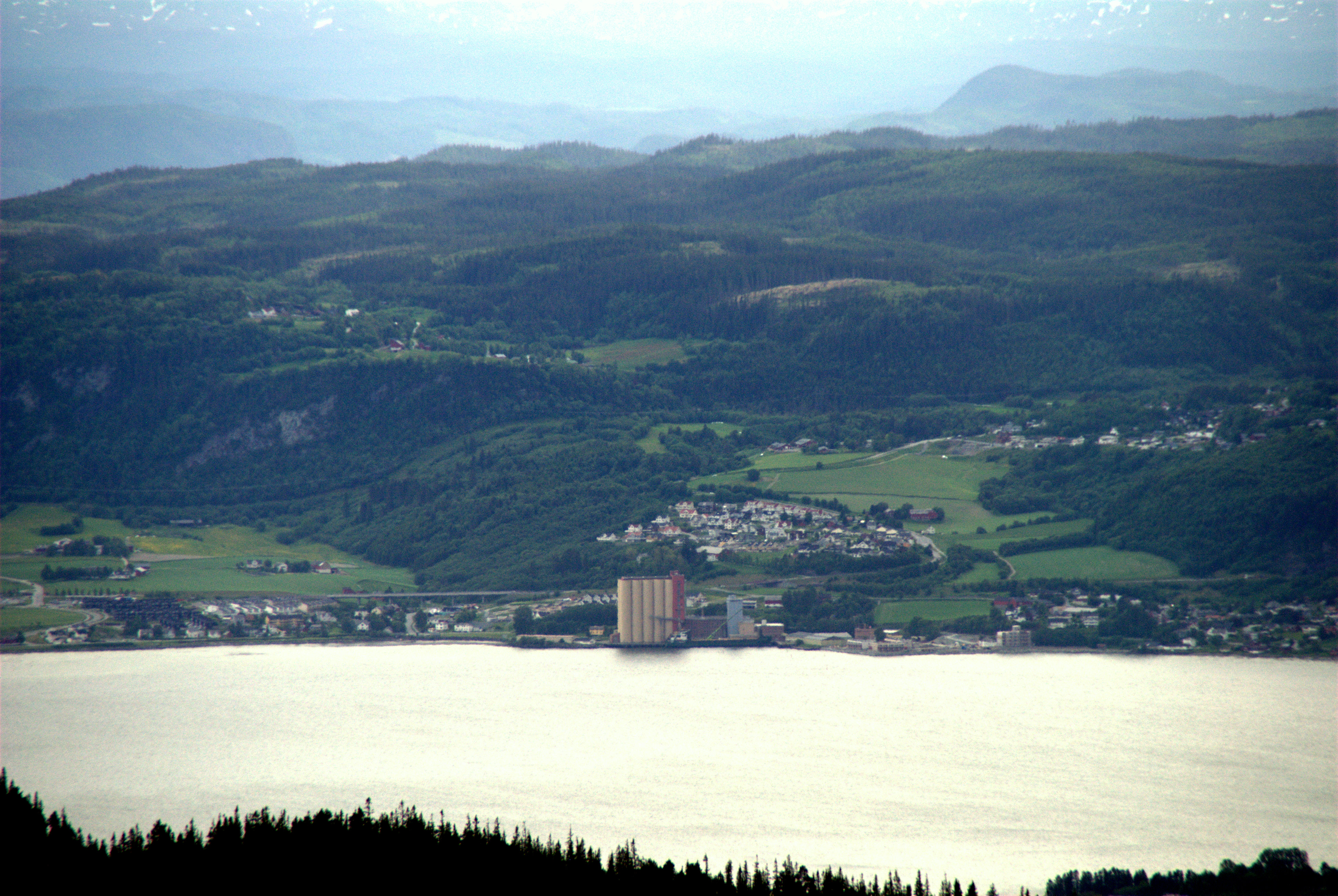
- View of Buvika

- Sør-Trøndelag within Norway

- Buvik within Sør-Trøndelag
- Coordinates: 63°18′42″N 10°11′10″E
- Country: Norway
- County: Sør-Trøndelag
- District: Gauldalen
- Established: 1855
  - Preceded by: Byneset Municipality
- Disestablished: 1 Jan 1965
  - Succeeded by: Skaun Municipality
- Administrative centre: Buvika

Government
  - Mayor (1952–1964): Fredrik Hammer (Ap)

Area (upon dissolution)
  - Total: 28 km^{2} (11 sq mi)
  - Rank: #488 in Norway
- Highest elevation: 445 m (1,460 ft)

Population (1964)
  - Total: 1,292
  - Rank: #468 in Norway
  - Density: 46.1/km^{2} (119/sq mi)
  - Change (10 years): ▲ +5.1%
- Demonym: Buvikværing

Official language
  - Norwegian form: Neutral
- Time zone: UTC+01:00 (CET)
  - Summer (DST): UTC+02:00 (CEST)
- ISO 3166 code: NO-1656

Buvik is a former municipality in the old Sør-Trøndelag county, Norway. Buvik existed from 1855 until 1965. The municipality encompassed the extreme northeastern part of what is now Skaun Municipality in Trøndelag county. It encompassed the roughly 25-square-kilometre (9.7 sq mi) area surrounding the Vigda river south of the Gaulosen fjord. The administrative centre was located in the village of Buvika.

Prior to its dissolution in 1965, the 28-square-kilometre (11 sq mi) municipality was the 488th largest by area out of the 525 municipalities in Norway. Buvik Municipality was the 468th most populous municipality in Norway with a population of about 1,292. The municipality's population density was 46.1 inhabitants per square kilometre (119/sq mi) and its population had increased by 5.1% over the previous 10-year period.

== General information ==
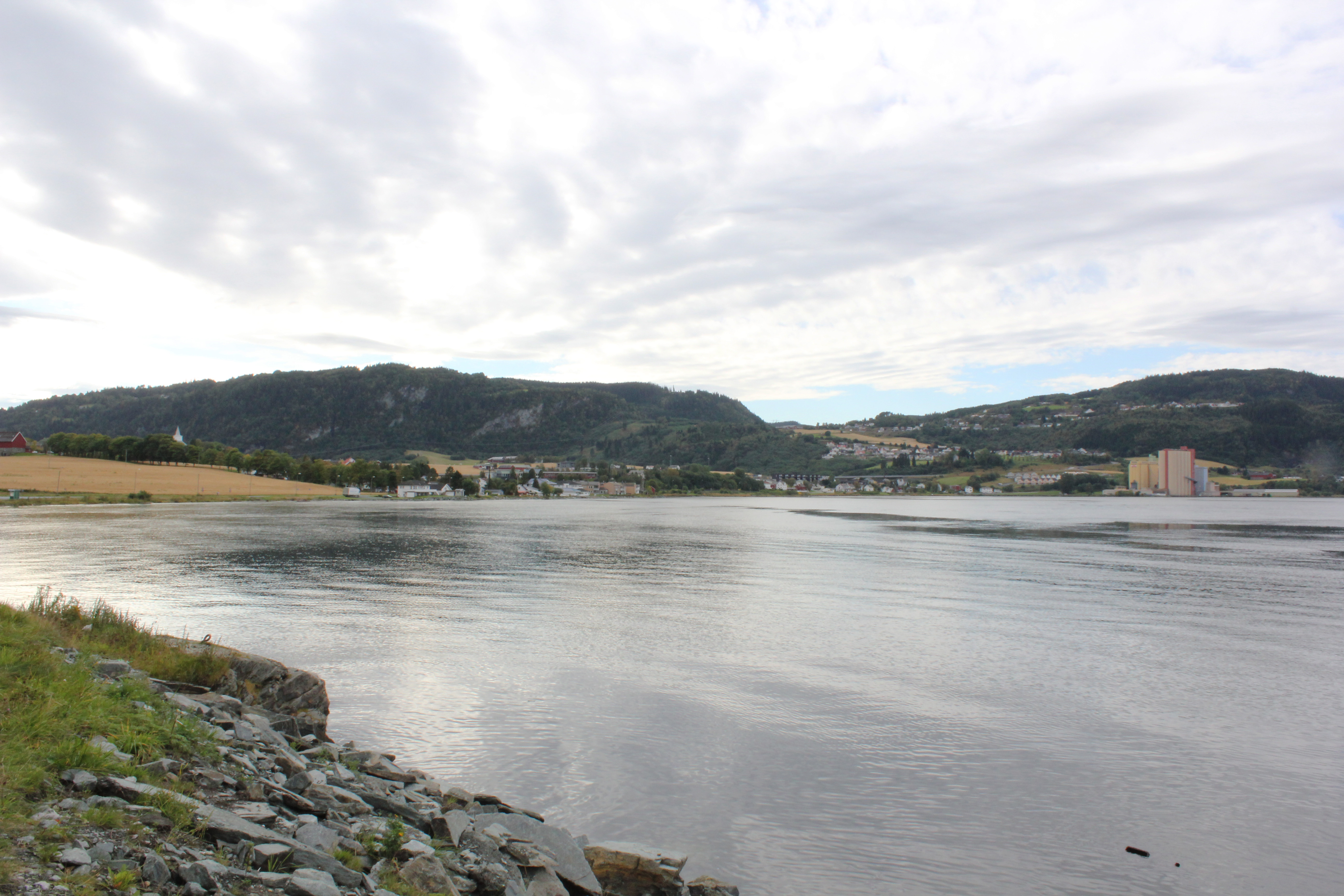
View of Buvika

The municipality was established in 1855 when the large Byneset Municipality was divided into two: the southern part (population: 841) became the new Buvik Municipality and the northern part (population: 2,109) remained as Byneset Municipality. During the 1960s, there were many municipal mergers across Norway due to the work of the Schei Committee. On 1 January 1964, the Langørgen farm area (population: 11) in Buvik Municipality was merged into the neighboring Melhus Municipality. Then, on 1 January 1965, the rest of Buvik Municipality (population: 1,267) was merged with the neighboring Børsa Municipality and Skaun Municipality to form a new, larger Skaun Municipality.

=== Name ===
The municipality (originally the parish) is named after the Buvik inlet (Old Norse: Boðvík), a small bay located on a southern branch of the main Trondheimsfjorden. The first element is boði which is a word that describes "waves breaking over hidden rocks". The last element is vík which means "inlet" or "cove". Historically, the name of the municipality was spelled Buviken. On 3 November 1917, a royal resolution changed the spelling of the name of the municipality to Buvik, removing the definite form ending -en.

=== Churches ===
The Church of Norway had one parish (sokn) within Buvik Municipality. At the time of the municipal dissolution, it was part of the Byneset prestegjeld and the Orkdal prosti (deanery) in the Diocese of Nidaros.

Churches in Buvik Municipality
Parish (sokn)	Church name	Location of the church	Year built
Buvik	Buvik Church	Buvika	1819

== Geography ==
The municipality was located along the Gaulosen coast, about 20 kilometres (12 mi) southwest of the city of Trondheim. Børsa Municipality and Skaun Municipality were to the west and Melhus Municipality was to the east. The highest point in the municipality was the 445-metre (1,460 ft) tall mountain Våttån, on the border between Buvik Municipality and Børsa Municipality.

== Government ==
While it existed, Buvik Municipality was responsible for primary education (through 10th grade), outpatient health services, senior citizen services, welfare and other social services, zoning, economic development, and municipal roads and utilities. The municipality was governed by a municipal council of directly elected representatives. The mayor was indirectly elected by a vote of the municipal council. The municipality was under the jurisdiction of the Frostating Court of Appeal.

=== Municipal council ===
The municipal council (Herredsstyre) of Buvik Municipality was made up of representatives that were elected to four year terms. The tables below show the historical composition of the council by political party.

Buvik herredsstyre 1963–1964
Party name (in Norwegian)	Number of representatives
Labour Party (Arbeiderpartiet)	9
Communist Party (Kommunistiske Parti)	1
Joint List(s) of Non-Socialist Parties (Borgerlige Felleslister)	5
Total number of members:	15

Buvik herredsstyre 1959–1963
Party name (in Norwegian)	Number of representatives
Labour Party (Arbeiderpartiet)	9
Conservative Party (Høyre)	1
Centre Party (Senterpartiet)	4
Liberal Party (Venstre)	1
Total number of members:	15

Buvik herredsstyre 1955–1959
Party name (in Norwegian)	Number of representatives
Labour Party (Arbeiderpartiet)	7
Communist Party (Kommunistiske Parti)	2
Farmers' Party (Bondepartiet)	4
Local List(s) (Lokale lister)	2
Total number of members:	15

Buvik herredsstyre 1951–1955
Party name (in Norwegian)	Number of representatives
Labour Party (Arbeiderpartiet)	6
Communist Party (Kommunistiske Parti)	1
Liberal Party (Venstre)	1
Joint List(s) of Non-Socialist Parties (Borgerlige Felleslister)	4
Total number of members:	12

Buvik herredsstyre 1947–1951
Party name (in Norwegian)	Number of representatives
Labour Party (Arbeiderpartiet)	4
Communist Party (Kommunistiske Parti)	2
Joint List(s) of Non-Socialist Parties (Borgerlige Felleslister)	6
Total number of members:	12

Buvik herredsstyre 1945–1947
Party name (in Norwegian)	Number of representatives
Labour Party (Arbeiderpartiet)	5
Communist Party (Kommunistiske Parti)	2
Joint List(s) of Non-Socialist Parties (Borgerlige Felleslister)	5
Total number of members:	12

Buvik herredsstyre 1937–1941*
Party name (in Norwegian)	Number of representatives
Labour Party (Arbeiderpartiet)	4
Joint List(s) of Non-Socialist Parties (Borgerlige Felleslister)	8
Total number of members:	12
Note: Due to the German occupation of Norway during World War II, no elections were held for new municipal councils until after the war ended in 1945.

=== Mayors ===
The mayor (Norwegian: ordfører) of Buvik Municipality was the political leader of the municipality and the chairperson of the municipal council. Here is a list of people who held this position:

- 1855–1856: Erik Walseth
- 1857–1857: Claus J. Huusby
- 1858–1861: Jens Christian Walseth
- 1862–1863: John T. Saltnes
- 1864–1871: Ole Larsen Huseby
- 1872–1875: Jens Christian Walseth
- 1876–1883: Ole Larsen Huseby
- 1884–1901: Arnt Einum (V)
- 1902–1904: Alt Evensen Onsøien (V)
- 1905–1916: John Saltnessand (V)
- 1917–1922: Erik Huseby (V)
- 1923–1925: Ole O. Krogstad (V)
- 1926–1932: John Lereggen (Bp)
- 1932–1934: Ola Olstad (Bp)
- 1935–1941: Elling Svange (Bp)
- 1942–1945: Anders Presthus (NS)
- 1945–1945: Elling Svange (Bp)
- 1946–1947: Fredrik Hammer (Ap)
- 1948–1950: Johan Snøfugl (Bp)
- 1950–1951: Anders Grøthe (V)
- 1951–1951: Gisle Overskott (Bp)
- 1952–1964: Fredrik Hammer (Ap)
