= Børsa Church =

Church in Trøndelag, Norway

- Børsa kirke
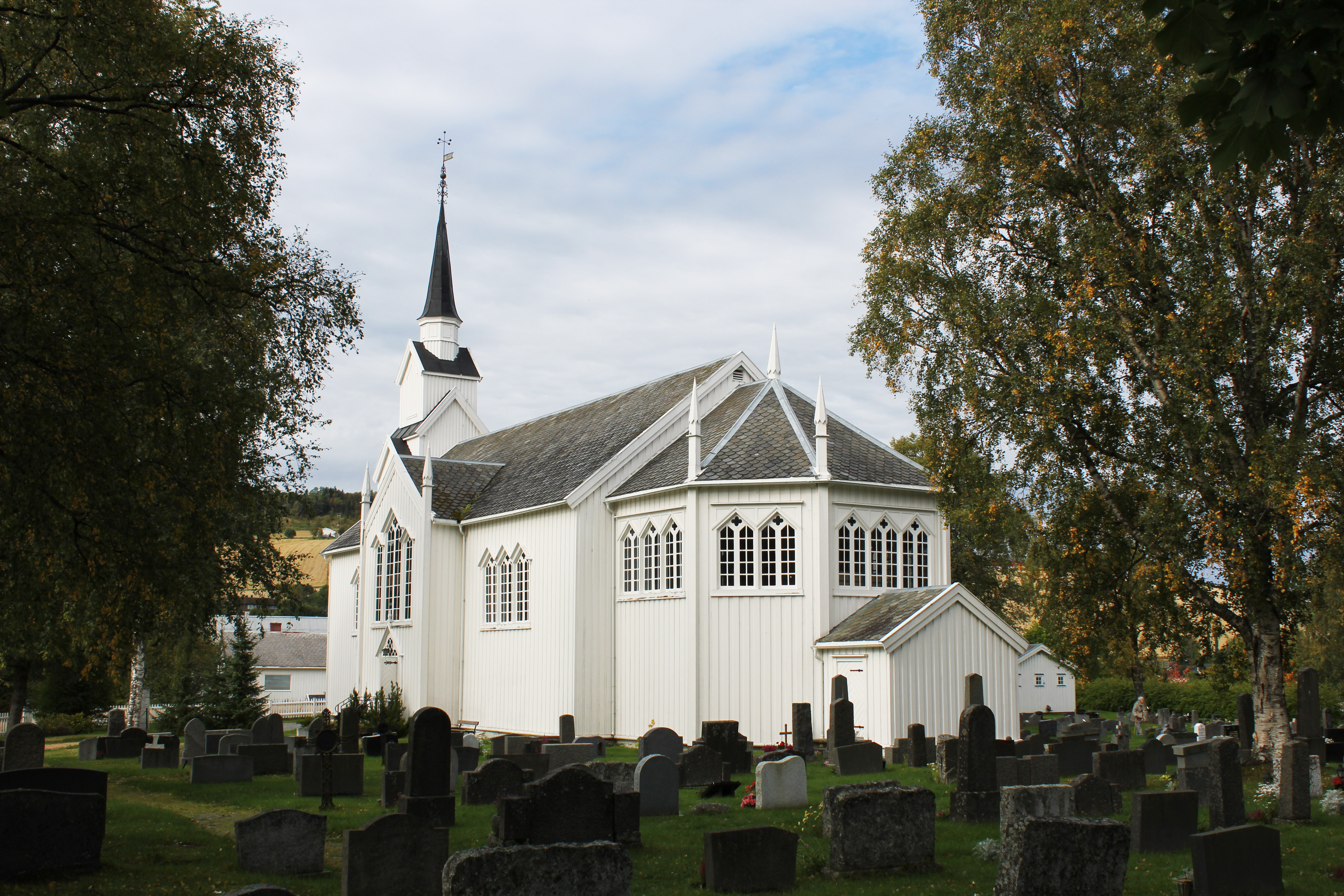
- View of the church
- Børsa Church
- 63.32525704745°N 10.072715431°E
- Location: Skaun Municipality, Trøndelag
- Country: Norway
- Denomination: Church of Norway
- Churchmanship: Evangelical Lutheran

History
- Former name: Viggen kirke
- Status: Parish church
- Founded: 13th century
- Consecrated: 26 Nov 1857

Architecture
- Functional status: Active
- Architect: Christian Heinrich Grosch
- Architectural type: Long church
- Style: Neo-Gothic
- Completed: 1857 (169 years ago)

Specifications
- Capacity: 380
- Materials: Wood

Administration
- Diocese: Nidaros bispedømme
- Deanery: Orkdal prosti
- Parish: Børsa
- Norwegian Cultural Heritage Site
- Type: Church
- Status: Listed
- ID: 84001

Børsa Church (Norwegian: Børsa kirke) is a parish church of the Church of Norway in Skaun Municipality in Trøndelag county, Norway. It is located in the village of Børsa. It is the church for the Børsa parish which is part of the Orkdal prosti (deanery) in the Diocese of Nidaros. The white, wooden church was built in a long church style in 1857 using plans drawn up by the architect Christian Heinrich Grosch. The church seats about 380 people.

== History ==
The earliest existing historical records of the church date back to the year 1589, but the church was not new that year. The first church in Børsa was likely a stave church that was located at Viggja (historically spelled Viggen), about 4.6 kilometres (2.9 mi) to the northwest of the present church site. The medieval church owned some silver from England that was dated from around the year 1230 which means the church may have been established some time in the 13th century. Because of its location historically, this church was formerly known as Viggen Church.

In 1668, the old medieval stave church was torn down and replaced with a log building in a fairly rare Y-shaped floor plan. In 1853, it was decided to move the church site to the more populous village of Børsa, so planning began for a new church. From 1856 to 1857, a new church was built in the village of Børsa, about 4.6 kilometres (2.9 mi) to the southeast of the old medieval site. After the new church was completed in 1857, the old Y-shaped church was torn down. The new church was consecrated on 26 November 1857.

== Media gallery ==
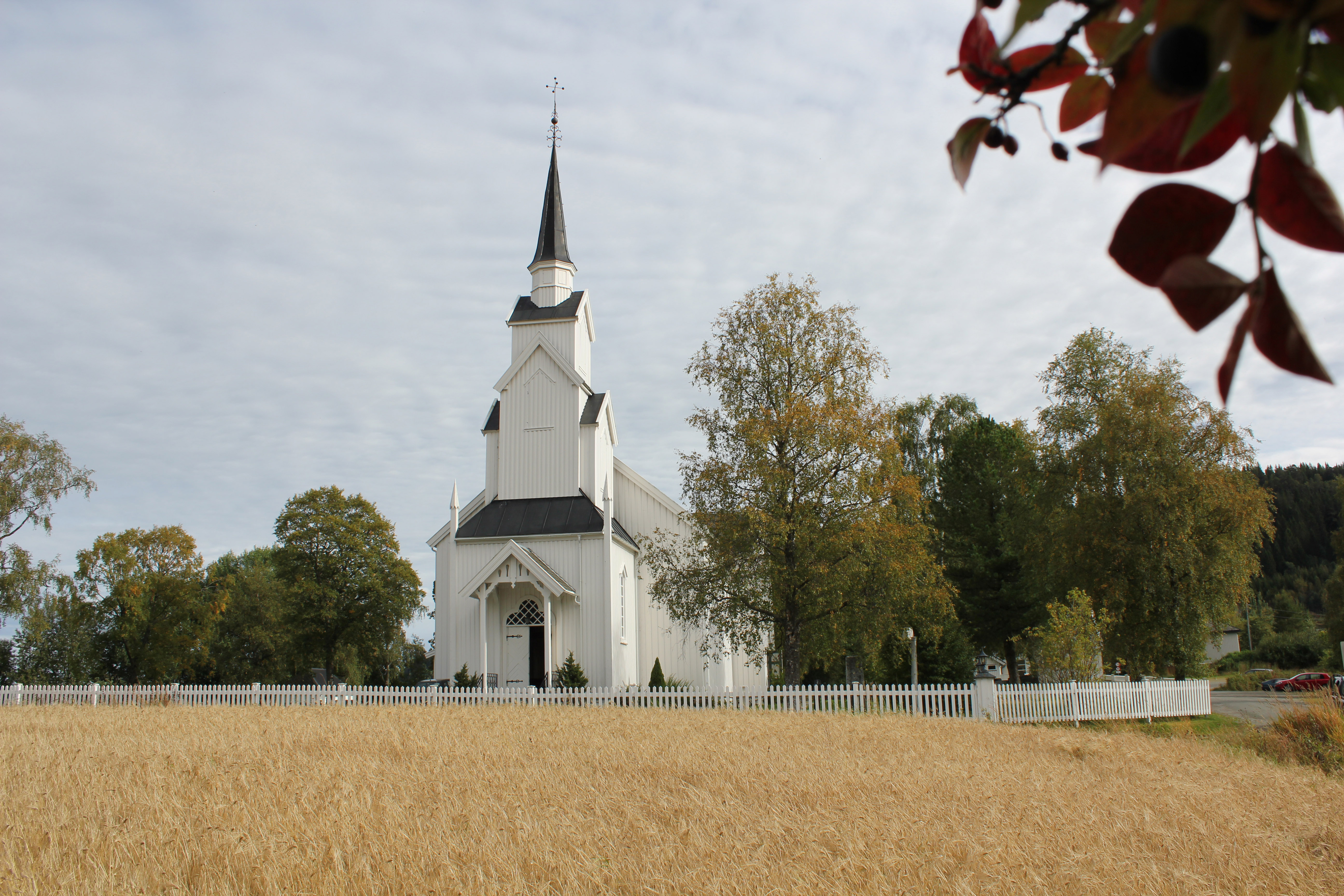

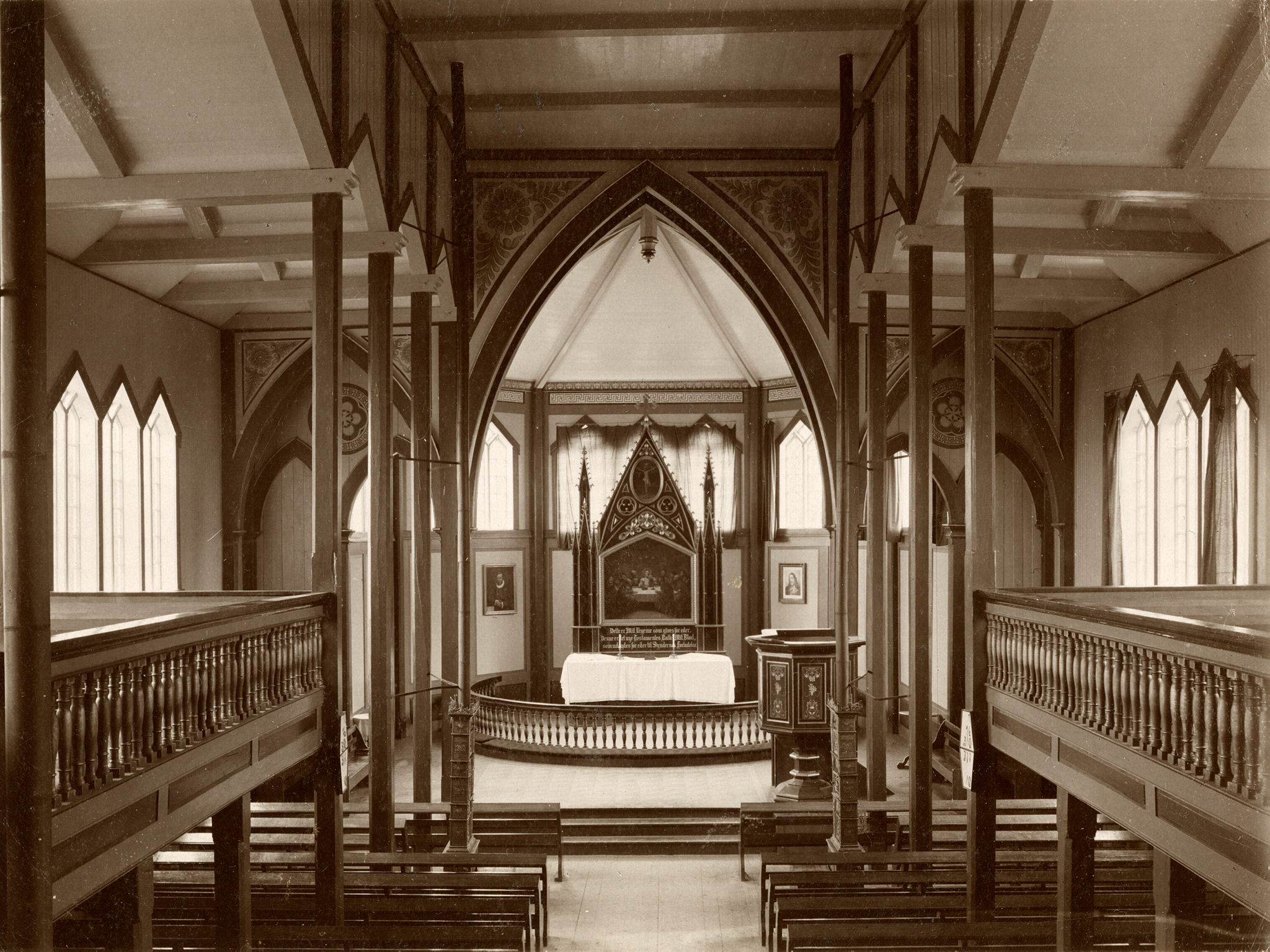

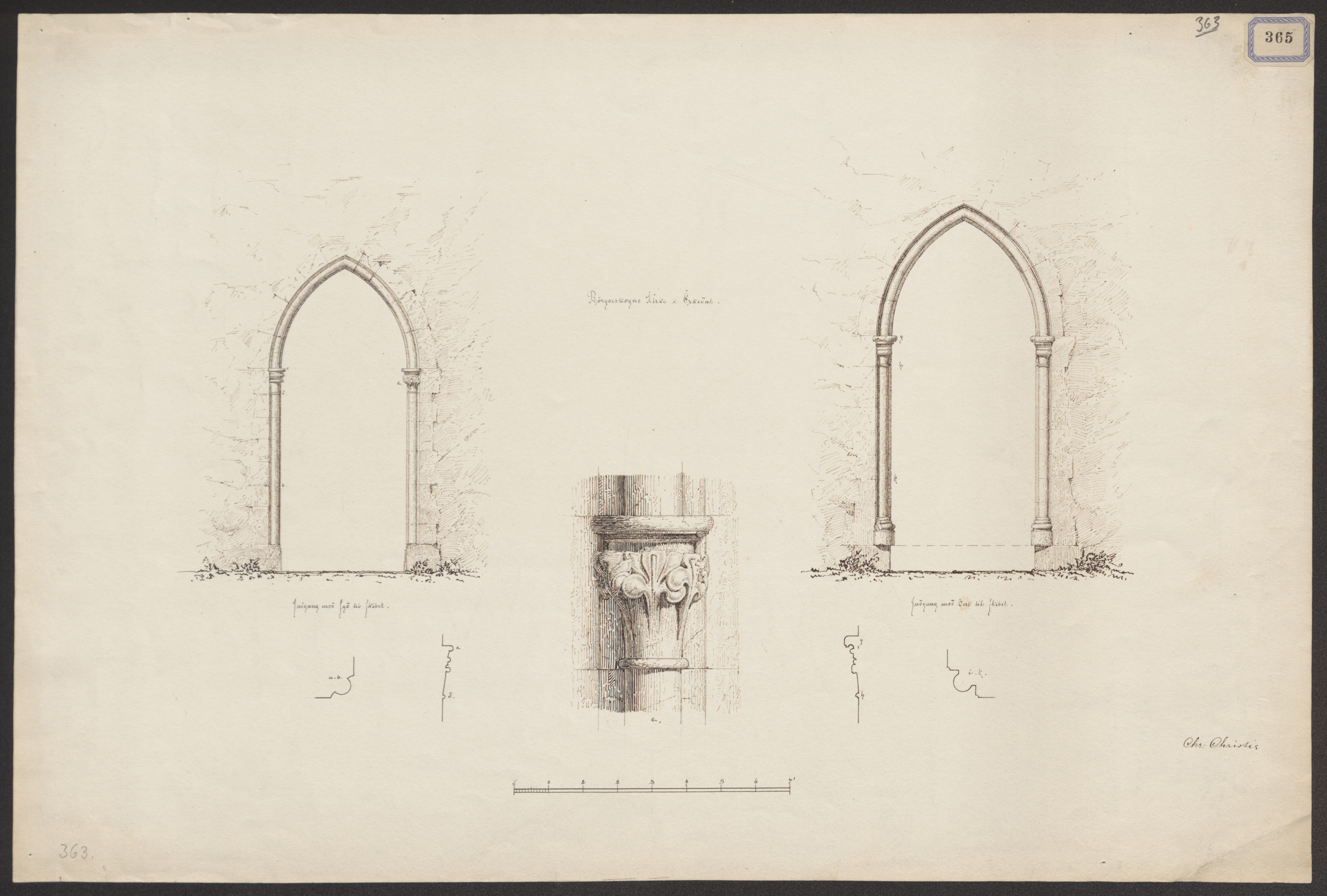

== See also ==
- List of churches in Nidaros
