= Børsa =

Village in Skaun Municipality, Norway

- Village
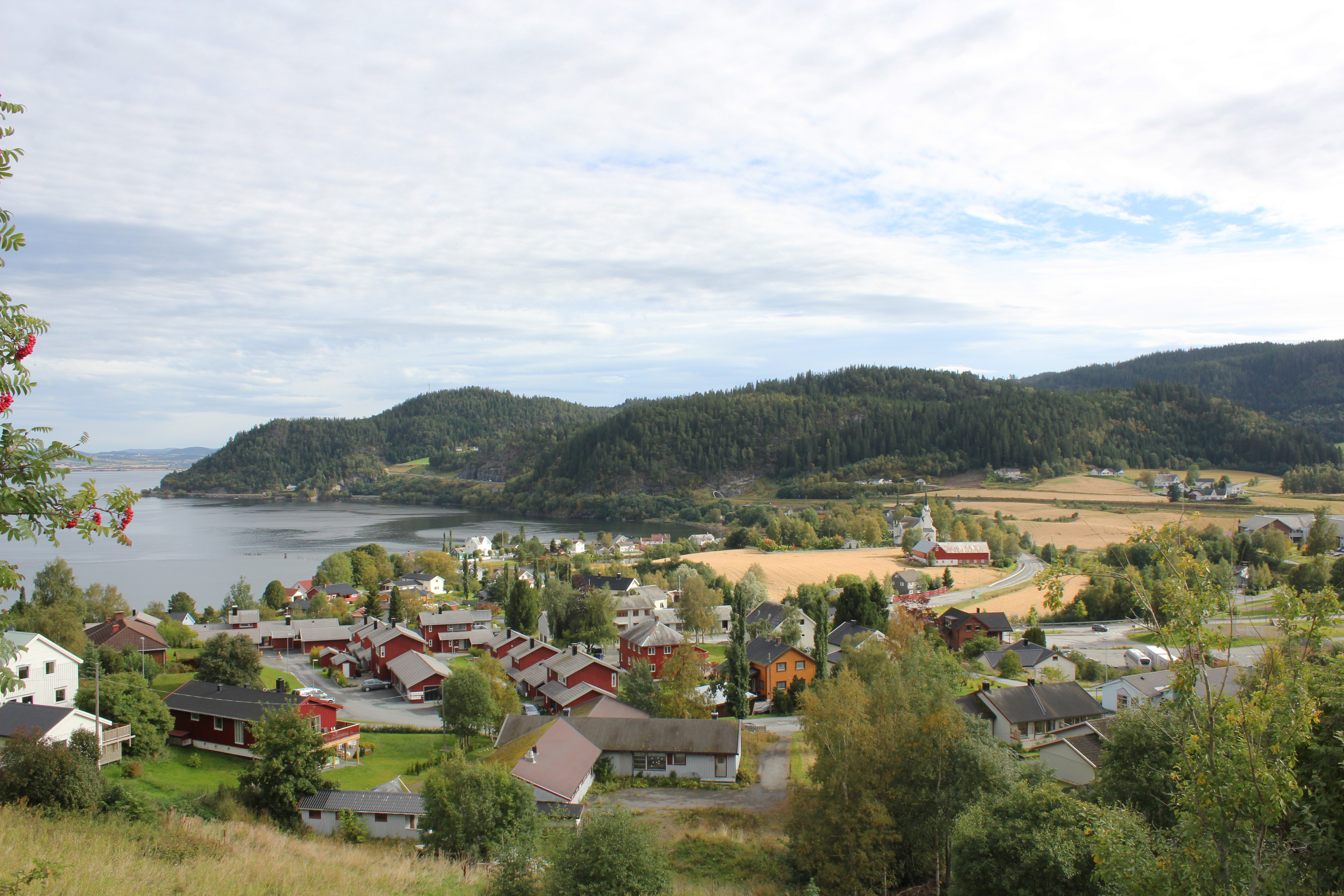
- View of the village
- Interactive map of Børsa
- Location within Trøndelag Location within Norway
- Coordinates: 63.3267°N 10.0692°E
- Country: Norway
- Region: Central Norway
- County: Trøndelag
- District: Orkdalen
- Municipality: Skaun MunicipalitySkaun Municipality

Area
  - Total: 1.12 km^{2} (0.43 sq mi)
- Elevation: 6 m (20 ft)

Population (2024)
  - Total: 1,824
  - Density: 1,629/km^{2} (4,220/sq mi)
- Time zone: UTC+01:00 (CET)
  - Summer (DST): UTC+02:00 (CEST)
- Post Code: 7353 Børsa

Børsa is the administrative centre of Skaun Municipality in Trøndelag county, Norway. The village lies along the shore of the Gaulosen, an arm off the vast Trondheimsfjorden. It is about 6 kilometres (3.7 mi) west of the village of Buvika, along the European route E39 highway. The villages of Skaun and Eggkleiva lie just a short distance to the south and the town of Orkanger lies about 15 kilometres (9.3 mi) to the west.

The 1.12-square-kilometre (280-acre) village has a population (2024) of 1,824 and a population density of 1,629 inhabitants per square kilometre (4,220/sq mi). Børsa Church is located in the village as is a school, several shops and restaurants, banks and businesses, and the municipal government offices.

== History ==
Historically, this village was the administrative centre of the old Børsa Municipality, which existed from 1838 until 1965.

== Media gallery ==
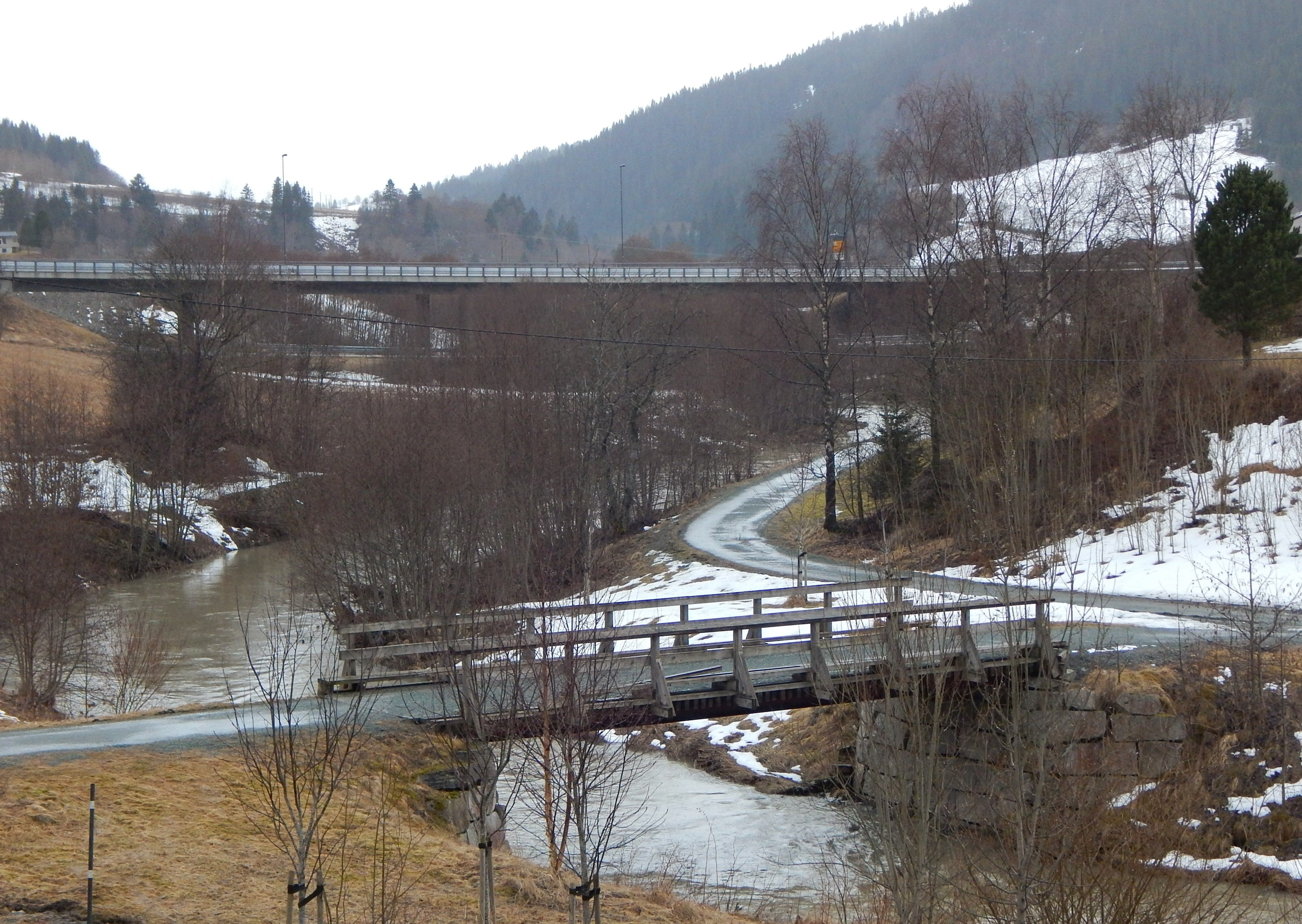
Børselva river in Børsa

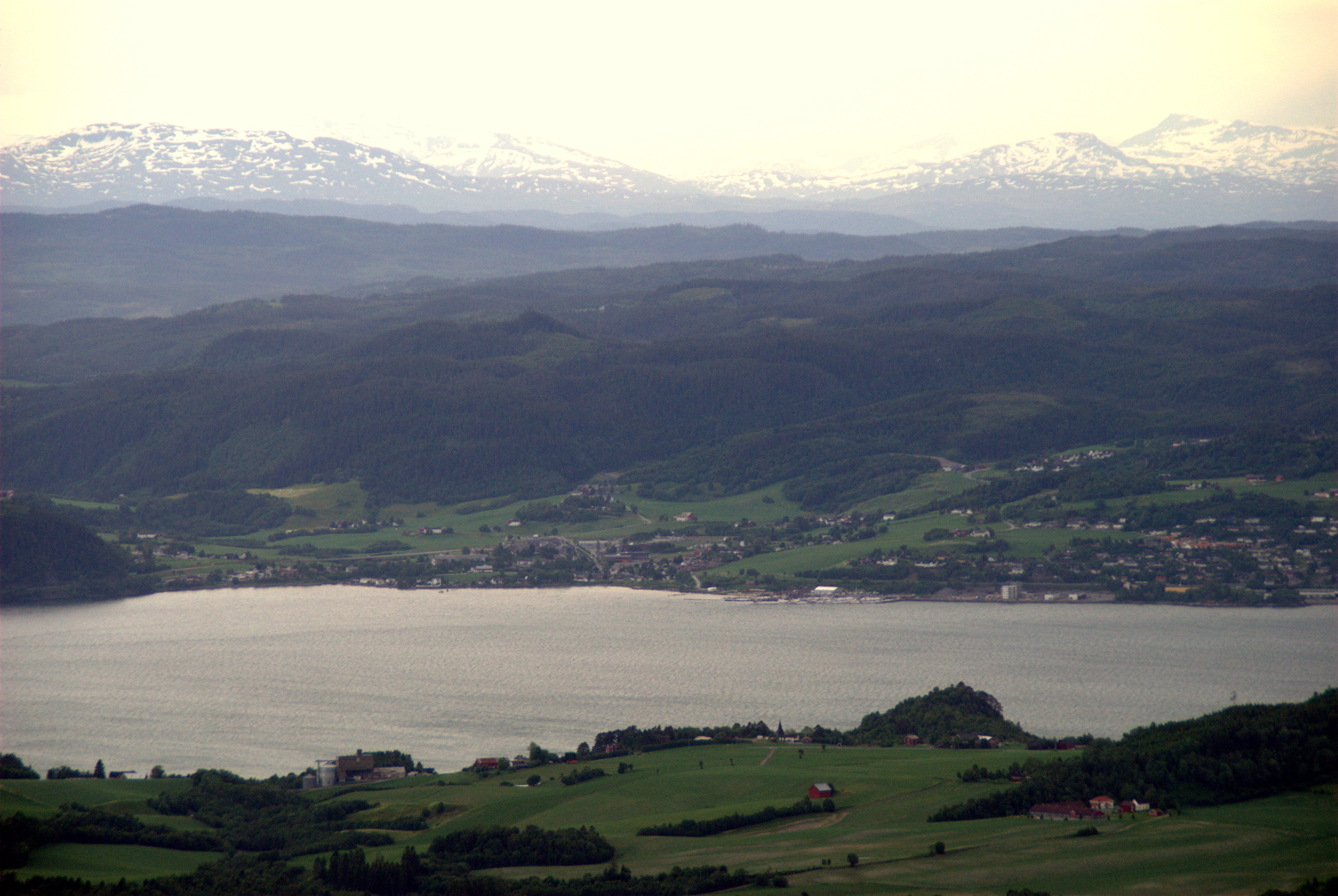
View of the village

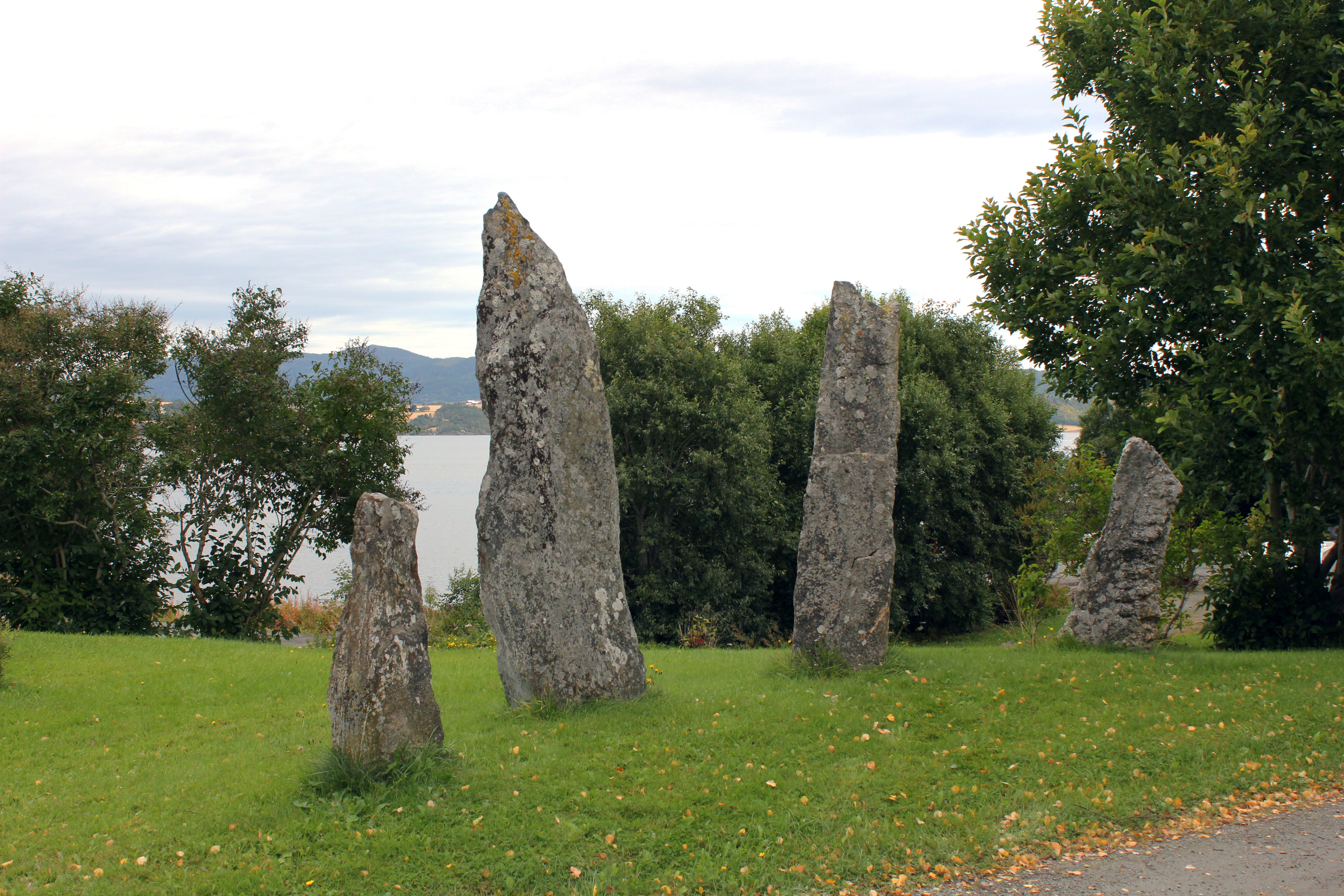
Historic stone markers

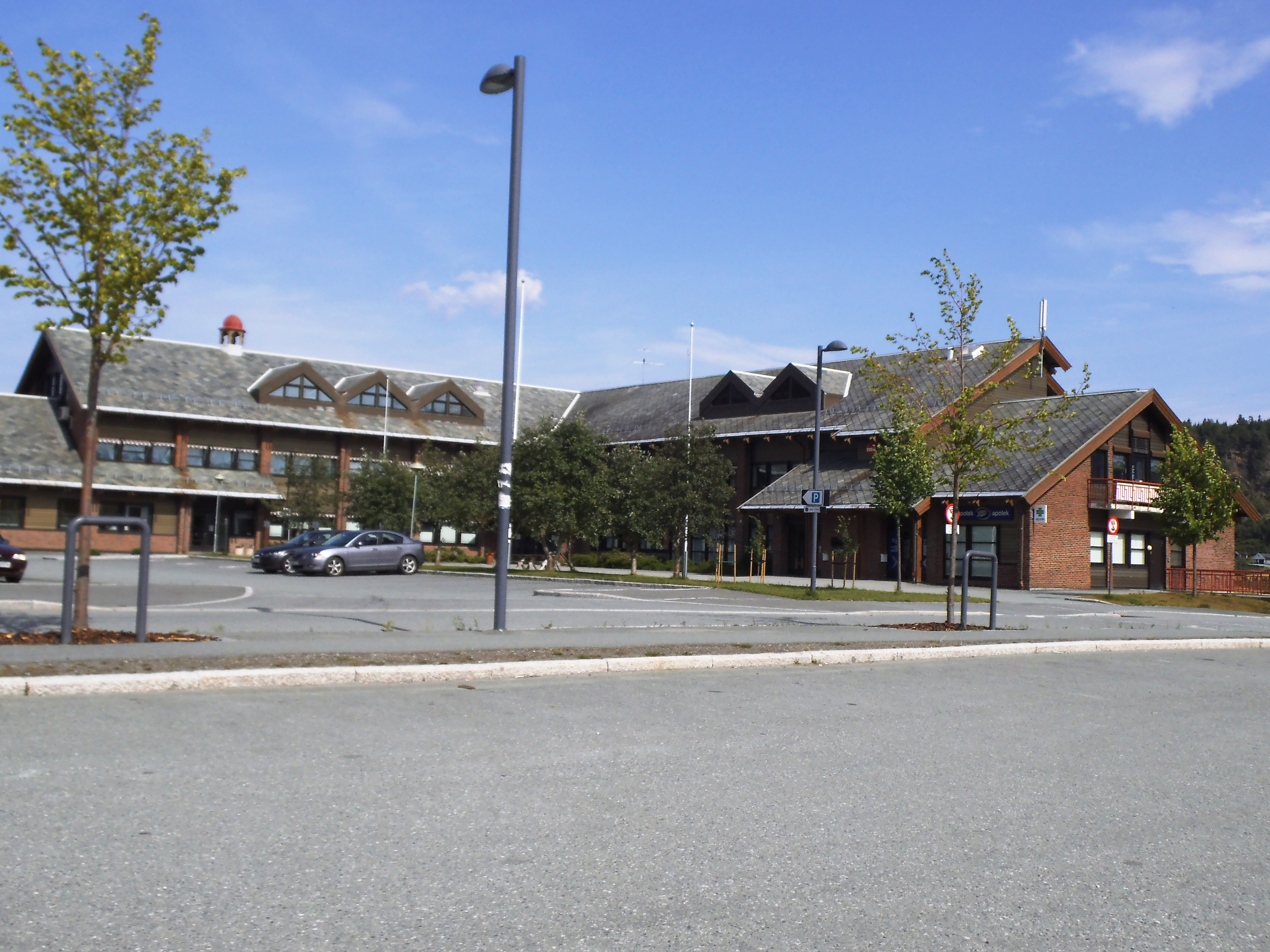
Municipal government building

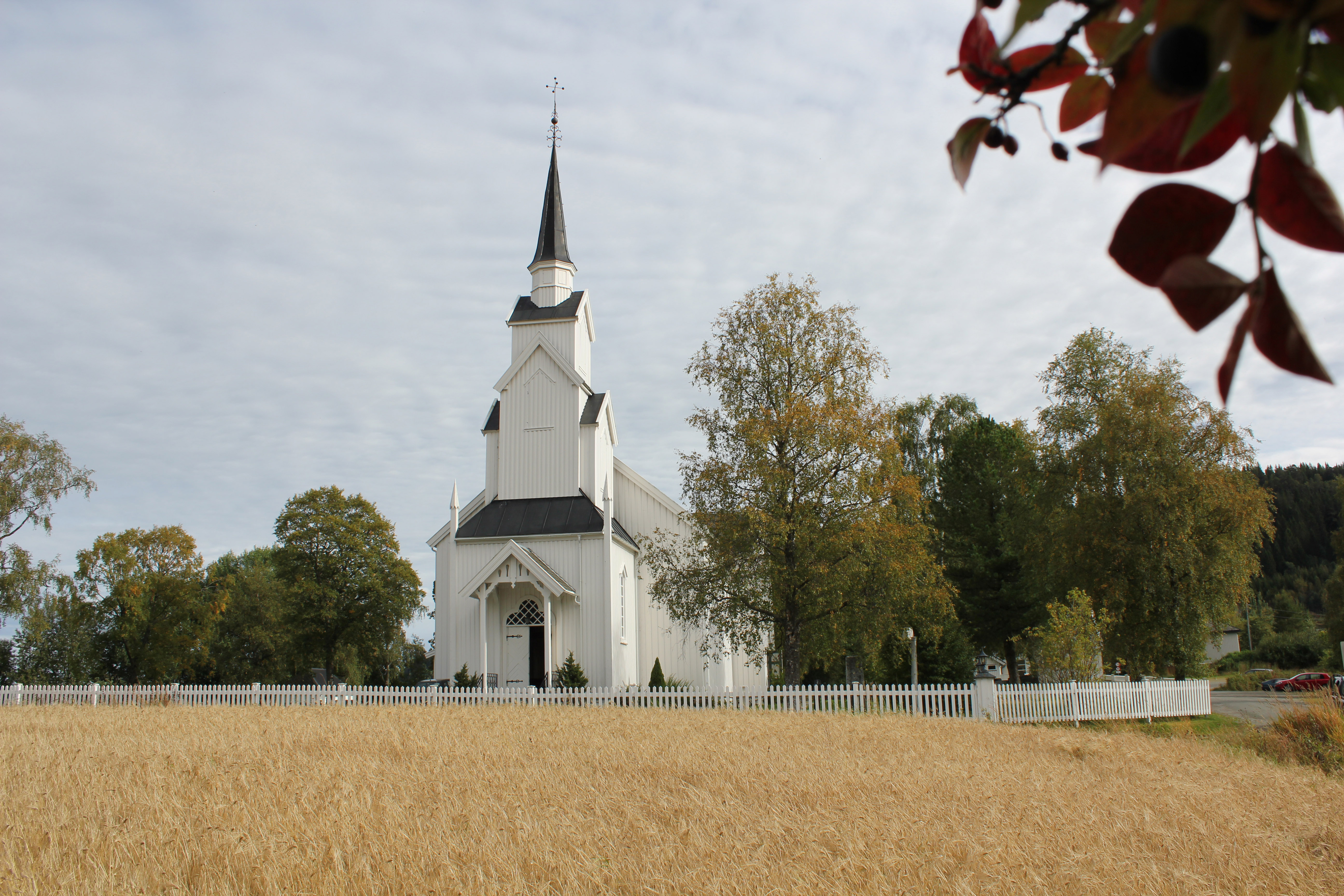
Børsa Church
