= Skaun (village) =

Village in Skaun Municipality, Norway

- Village
- Interactive map of Skaun
- Location within Trøndelag Location within Norway
- Coordinates: 63.2515°N 10.0524°E
- Country: Norway
- Region: Central Norway
- County: Trøndelag
- District: Orkdalen
- Municipality: Skaun Municipality
- Elevation: 110 m (360 ft)
- Time zone: UTC+01:00 (CET)
  - Summer (DST): UTC+02:00 (CEST)
- Post Code: 7357 Skaun

Skaun is a small village in Skaun Municipality in Trøndelag county, Norway. The village is located along the Norwegian County Road 709, about 4 kilometres (2.5 mi) south of the village of Eggkleiva. Skaun Church is located in the village.

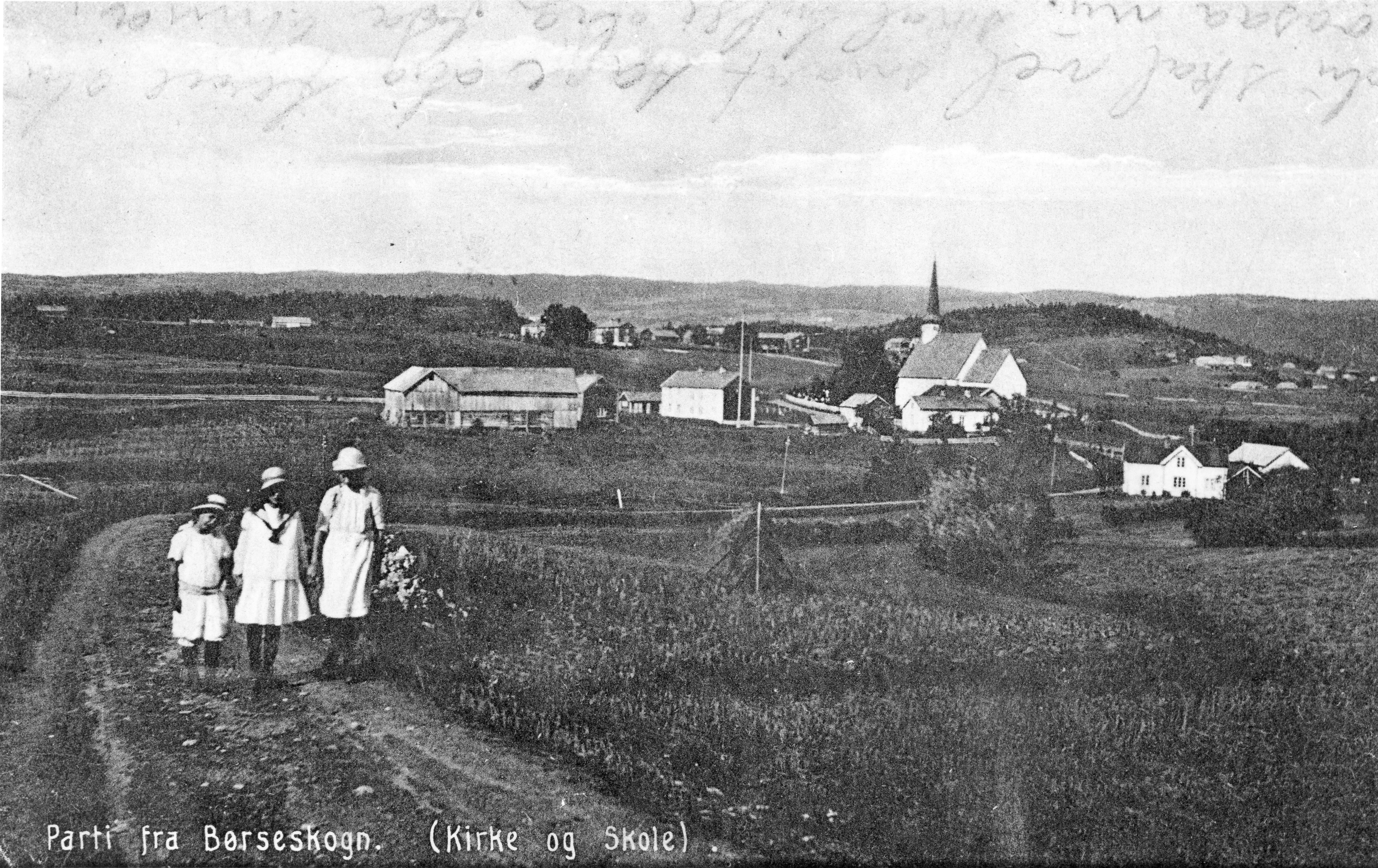
View of the village area (c. 1920)
