= List of open-air and living history museums =

This is a list of open-air and living history museums by country.

== Africa ==
=== Egypt ===
- Luxor Upper Egypt
- Memphis ruins
- Karnak largest temple complex in the world

=== South Africa ===
- Pilgrim's Rest, Mpumalaga Province
- Worcester Museum (Klein plasie open-air museum), Worcester Western Cape
- Sonskip / Aardskip earthship open-air museum, Orania Northern Cape

=== Tunisia ===
- Djerba (Djerbahood).
- Matmata (Open-Air Museum of "Troglodyte" houses), Governorate of Gabes, south part of Tunisia, the whole village registered by UNESCO World Heritage, today is maintained by the Association of the Cultural Protection of Matmata)
- Oudhref (Open-air village museum), Governorate of Gabes

== Asia ==
=== Bahrain ===
• Bahrain Pearling Trail

=== China ===
- Lei Cheng Uk Han Tomb Museum, Hong Kong
- Sam Tung Uk Museum, Hong Kong
- Xinye Village, Zhejiang

=== India ===
- Shaheedi Park, Delhi

=== Indonesia ===
- Taman Mini Indonesia Indah

=== Israel and the Golan Heights ===
- Eretz Israel Museum
- Kfar Kedem
- Katzrin Ancient Village
- Nazareth Village

=== Japan ===
- Edo-Tokyo Open Air Architectural Museum, Tokyo
- Hakone Open-Air Museum, Hakone, Kanagawa
- Hida Minzoku Mura Folk Village, Takayama, Gifu
- Historical Village of Hokkaido (Hokkaidō Kaitaku no Mura), Sapporo, Hokkaido
- Kyodo no mori, Fuchū, Tokyo
- Meiji Mura, Inuyama, Aichi
- Nihon Minka-en (Japan Open-Air Folk House Museum), Kawasaki, Kanagawa
- Open-Air Museum of Old Japanese Farmhouses, Osaka
- Ryukyu Mura, Onna, Okinawa Prefecture
- Sankeien, Naka Ward, Yokohama
- Shikoku Mura, Takamatsu, Kagawa Prefecture

=== Malaysia ===
- Mari Mari Cultural Village, Kota Kinabalu District, Sabah
- Monsopiad Heritage Village, Penampang District, Sabah
- Taman Tamadun Islam (Islamic Civilization Park), Kuala Terengganu, Terengganu

=== Philippines ===
- Las Casas Filipinas de Acuzar

=== South Korea ===
- Korean Folk Village, Yongin, Gyeonggi

=== Taiwan ===
- 921 Earthquake Museum of Taiwan, Taichung
- Ju Ming Museum, New Taipei

== Europe ==
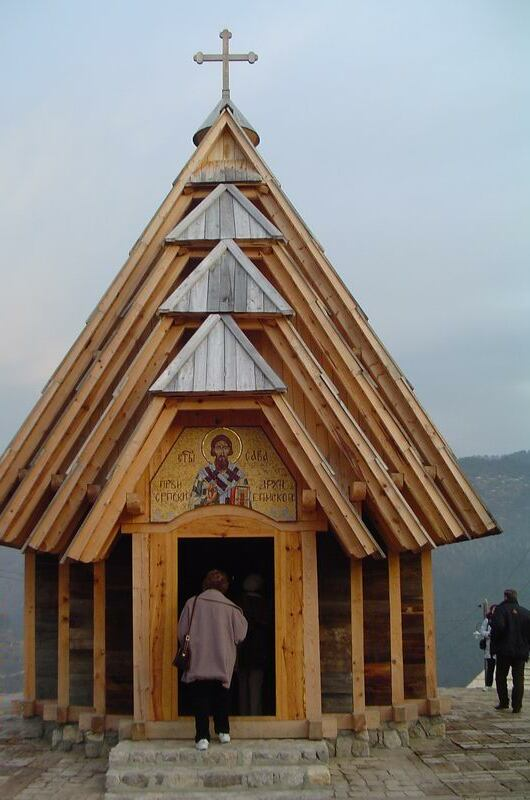
The wooden church in Drvengrad open-air museum, Serbia

=== Austria ===
- Austrian Open-Air Museum (Österreichisches Freilichtmuseum Stübing), Stübing
- Carinthian Open-Air Museum, Maria Saal
- Carnuntum, Petronell-Carnuntum
- Museums of Tyrolian Farmsteads, Kramsach
- Museumsdorf Niedersulz; Sulz im Weinviertel
- Salzburger Freilichtmuseum, Großgmain

=== Belgium ===
- Atlantic Wall open-air museum (Atlantikwall Openluchtmuseum), (Ostend, West Flanders)
- Openluchtmuseum Bachten de Kupe, (Alveringem, West Flanders)
- Bokrijk open-air museum (Openluchtmuseum Bokrijk), (Genk, Province of Limburg)
- Museum of Rural Life in Wallonia (Musée de la Vie rurale en Wallonie), (Saint-Hubert, Province of Luxembourg)

=== Bulgaria ===
- Etar Architectural-Ethnographic Complex, Gabrovo

=== Czech Republic ===
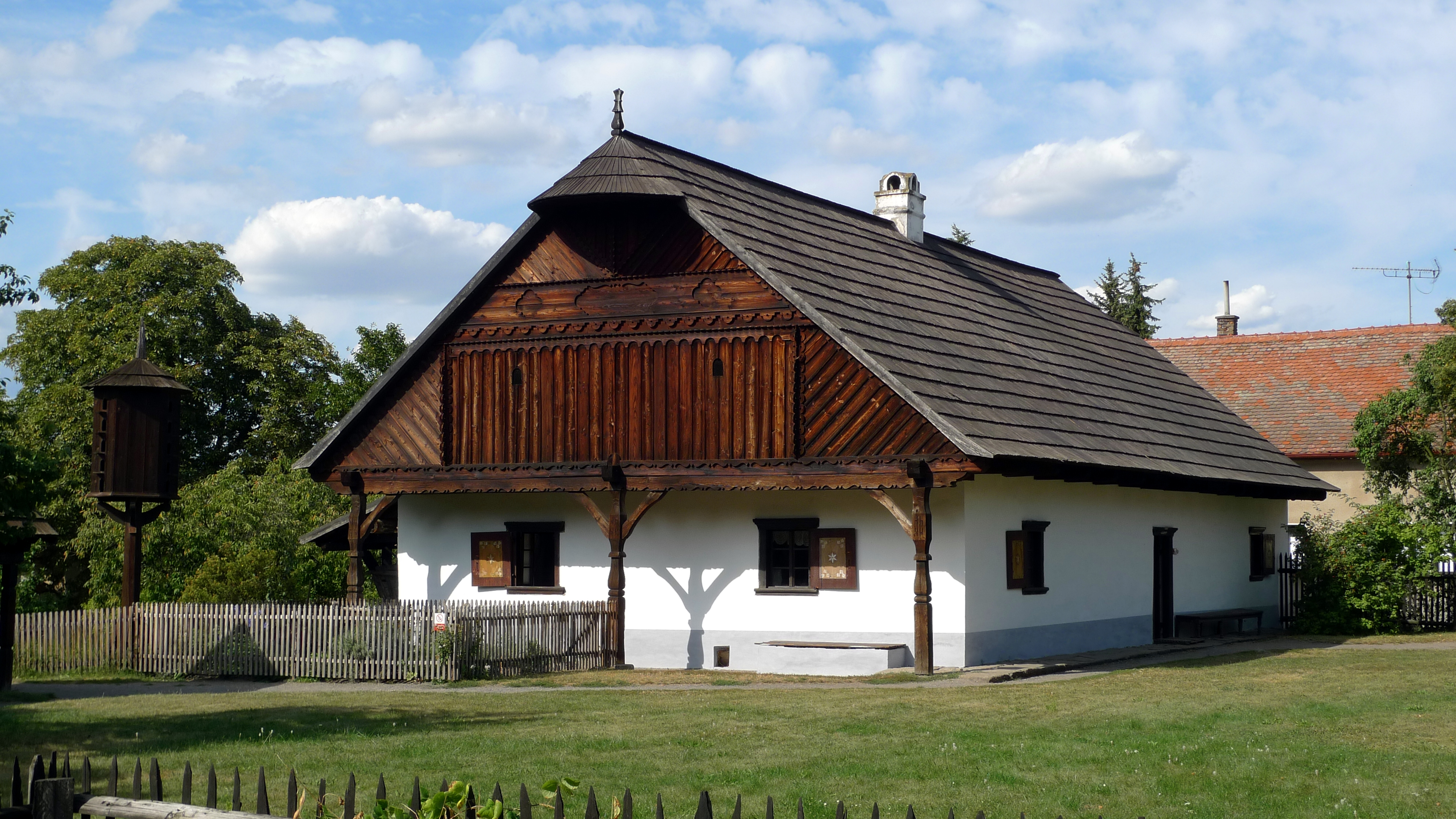
Old Bohemian House in Přerov nad Labem, Czech Republic – the first open-air museum in Central and Eastern Europe (1895) founded by Archduke Ludwig Salvator

- Hanácké open air museum (Hanácké Skanzen), Příkazy
- Museum of Folk Architecture in Kouřim (Muzeum lidových staveb v Kouřimi), Kouřim
- Polabské muzeum, Přerov nad Labem— the oldest open air museum in Central and Eastern Europe
- Skanzen Strážnice, Strážnice
- Skanzen Vysoký Chlumec, Vysoký Chlumec
- Skanzen Veselý kopec (museum of folk architecture in Veselý Kopec), Vysočina
- Wallachian Open Air Museum (Wallachian Ethnographic Museum), Rožnov pod Radhoštěm

=== Denmark ===
- Co-operative Village Nyvang, Andelslandsbyen Nyvang, Holbæk
- Glud Museum, near Horsens
- The Old Village, Hjerl Hede, Vinderup
- Land of legends (Sagnlandet Lejre), Lejre
- Maribo Open-Air Museum, Maribo
- Open Air Museum (Kongens Lyngby), Kongens Lyngby
- Ribe Vikingecenter, Ribe
- The Funen Village (Den Fynske Landsby) in the Fruens Bøge district of Odense
- The Middle Ages Center in Sundby a suburb of Nykøbing Falster
- The Old Town - Den Gamle By, Aarhus
- Vikingeborgen Trelleborg, Slagelse

=== Estonia ===
- Estonian Open Air Museum, Tallinn
- Mahtra Peasant Museum, Mahtra, Juuru Parish, Rapla County
- Mihkli Farm Museum, Viki, Kihelkonna Parish, Saare County
- Mõniste Peasant Museum, Kuutsi, Mõniste Parish, Võru County
- Põlva Peasant Museum, Karilatsi, Kõlleste Parish, Põlva County
- Viimsi Open Air Museum, Pringi, Viimsi Parish; near Tallinn

=== Finland ===
- Luostarinmäki, Turku
- Pielisen museo, Lieksa
- Seurasaari Open-Air Museum, Helsinki
- Telkkämäki Heritage Farm, Kaavi
- Turkansaari, Oulu

=== France ===
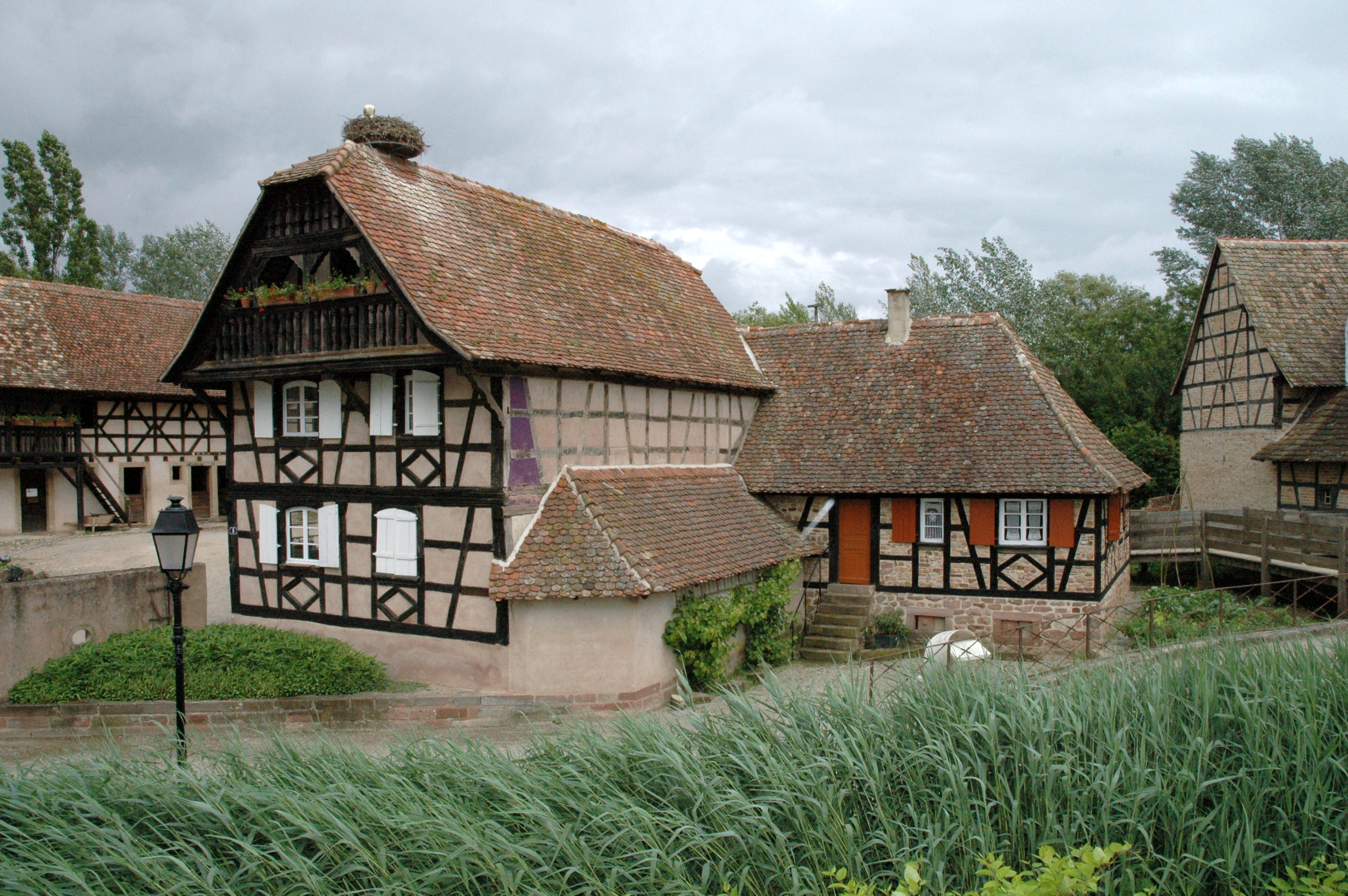
View of the Écomusée d'Alsace, the largest open-air museum in France

samara arboretum, La Chaussee-Tirancourt, Picardy

- Marquèze, Sabres, Landes, Nouvelle-Aquitaine
- Musée de plein air des maisons comtoises, Nancray, Doubs, Franche-Comté
- Musée de plein air de Villeneuve-d'Ascq, Villeneuve-d'Ascq
- Ecomusée d'Alsace, Ungersheim
- Poul-Fetan, Quistinic (Morbihan)
- Village des Bories, Gordes (Vaucluse)
- Château de Guédelon, Treigny, Yonne, Bourgogne

=== Germany ===
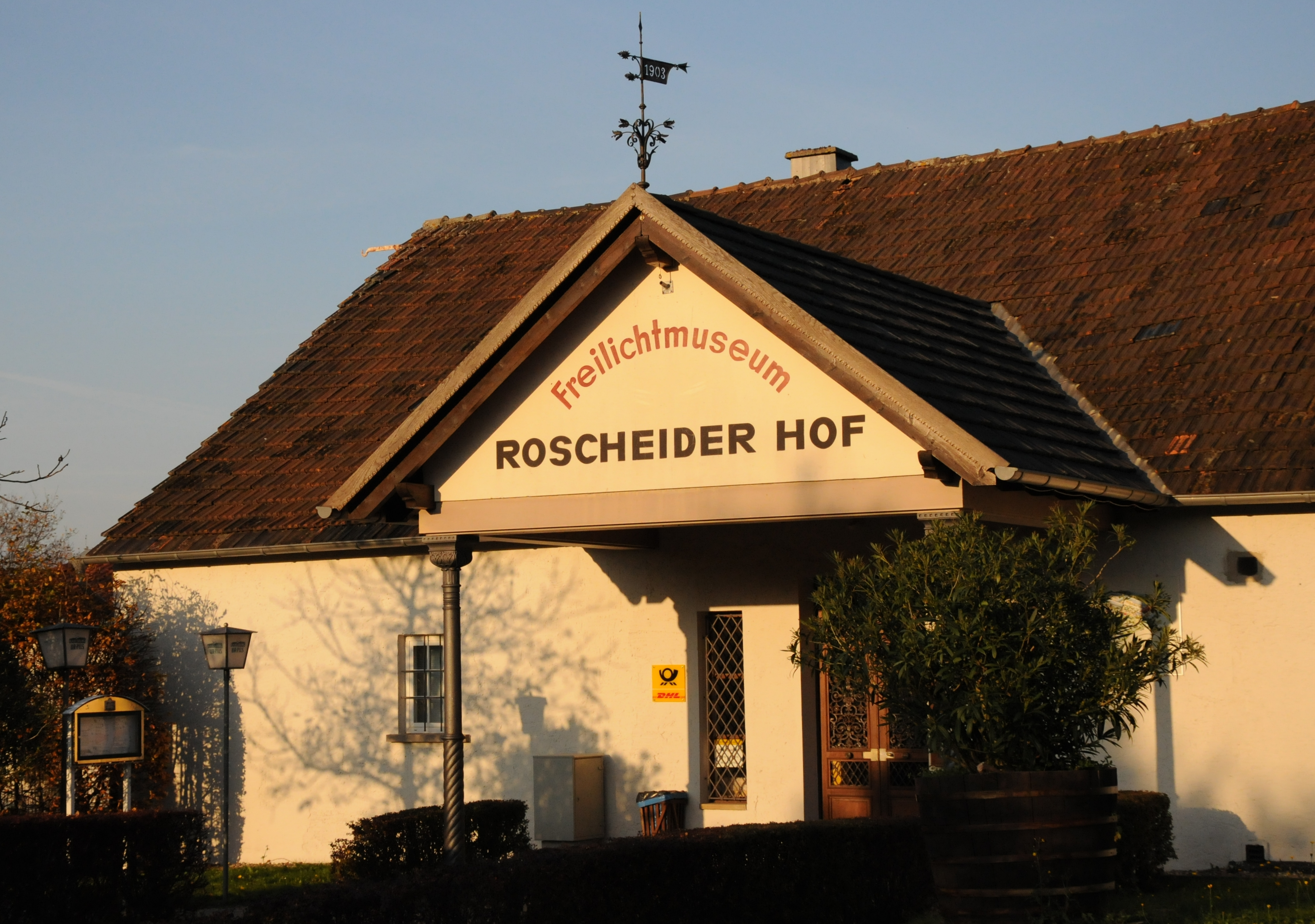
Roscheider Hof, Germany

- Freilichtmuseum Amerang (Amerang Open Air Museum), Bavaria
- Rüdersdorf Museum Park , Brandenburg
- Bavarian Forest Museum Village, Tittling
- Black Forest Open Air Museum "Vogtsbauernhof", Gutach, Baden-Württemberg
- Campus Galli medieval town with Carolingian monastery, Meßkirch, Baden-Württemberg
- Dat ole Huus, Wilsede, Lower Saxony
- Detmold Open-air Museum, Detmold, North Rhine-Westphalia
- Düppel museum village, Berlin
- Freilichtmuseum Glentleiten|Glentleiten Open Air Museum, Bavaria
- Groß Raden Archaeological Open Air Museum, nr Sternberg, Mecklenburg-Vorpommern
- Hagen Open-air Museum, Hagen, North Rhine-Westphalia
- Hessenpark, Neu-Anspach, Hesse
- Hitzacker Archaeological Centre, Hitzacker, Lower Saxony
- Hösseringen Museum Village, Hösseringen, Lower Saxony
- International Wind- and Watermill Museum, Gifhorn, Lower Saxony
- Kommern Open-air Museum, Mechernich, North Rhine-Westphalia
- Lindlar Open-air Museum, Lindlar, North Rhine-Westphalia
- Lower Bavarian Open-Air Museums, Finsterau and Massing
- Mödlareuth village, Bavaria and Thuringia
- Oerlinghausen Archaeological Open-Air Museum (Das Archäologische Freilichtmuseum Oerlinghausen), Oerlinghausen, North Rhine-Westphalia
- Ore Mountain Toy Museum, Seiffen, Saxony
- Pfahlbaumuseum Unteruhldingen, Unteruhldingen, Baden-Württemberg
- Rhineland-Palatinate Open Air Museum Bad Sobernheim (Rheinland-Pfälzisches Freilichtmuseum Bad Sobernheim), Bad Sobernheim, Rhineland-Palatinate
- Rischmannshof Heath Museum, Walsrode, Lower Saxony
- Roscheider Hof, Konz, Rhineland-Palatinate
- Slavic Village Passentin, near Neubrandenburg, Mecklenburg-Vorpommern
- Swabian Farm Museum (Schwäbisches Bauernhofmuseum Illerbeuren), Illerbeuren, Bavaria
- Winsen Museum Farm, Winsen (Aller), Lower Saxony

=== Georgia ===
- Tbilisi Open Air Museum of Ethnography, Tbilisi

=== Hungary ===
- Hungarian open air museum (Szabadtéri Néprajzi Múzeum), Szentendre
- Szennai Szabadtéri Néprajzi Gyűjtemény, Szenna
- Göcseji Falumúzeum, Zalaegerszeg
- Őrségi Népi Műemlékegyüttes, Szalafő-(Pityerszer)
- Szabadtéri Néprajzi Múzeum, Ópusztaszer
- Sóstói Múzeumfalu, Nyíregyháza
- Vasi Múzeumfalu, Szombathely
- Hollókői Falumúzeum, Hollókő
- Szabadtéri Néprajzi Múzeum, Nagyvázsony
- Szabadtéri Néprajzi Múzeum, Tihany
- Emese Várispánság Szigethalom

=== Iceland ===
- Árbæjarsafn

=== Ireland ===
- Bunratty Castle and Folk Park, County Clare
- Connemara Heritage & History Centre
- Kerry Bog Village

=== Isle of Man ===
- Cregneash - The first open-air museum in the British Isles

=== Italy ===
- Museo a Cielo Aperto Ulàssai (Open-Air Museum Ulàssai)
- Museodiffuso
- Poggibonsi Archaeodrome - Open Air Museum
- Bostel di Rotzo - Castelletto di Rotzo, Vicenza

=== Latvia ===
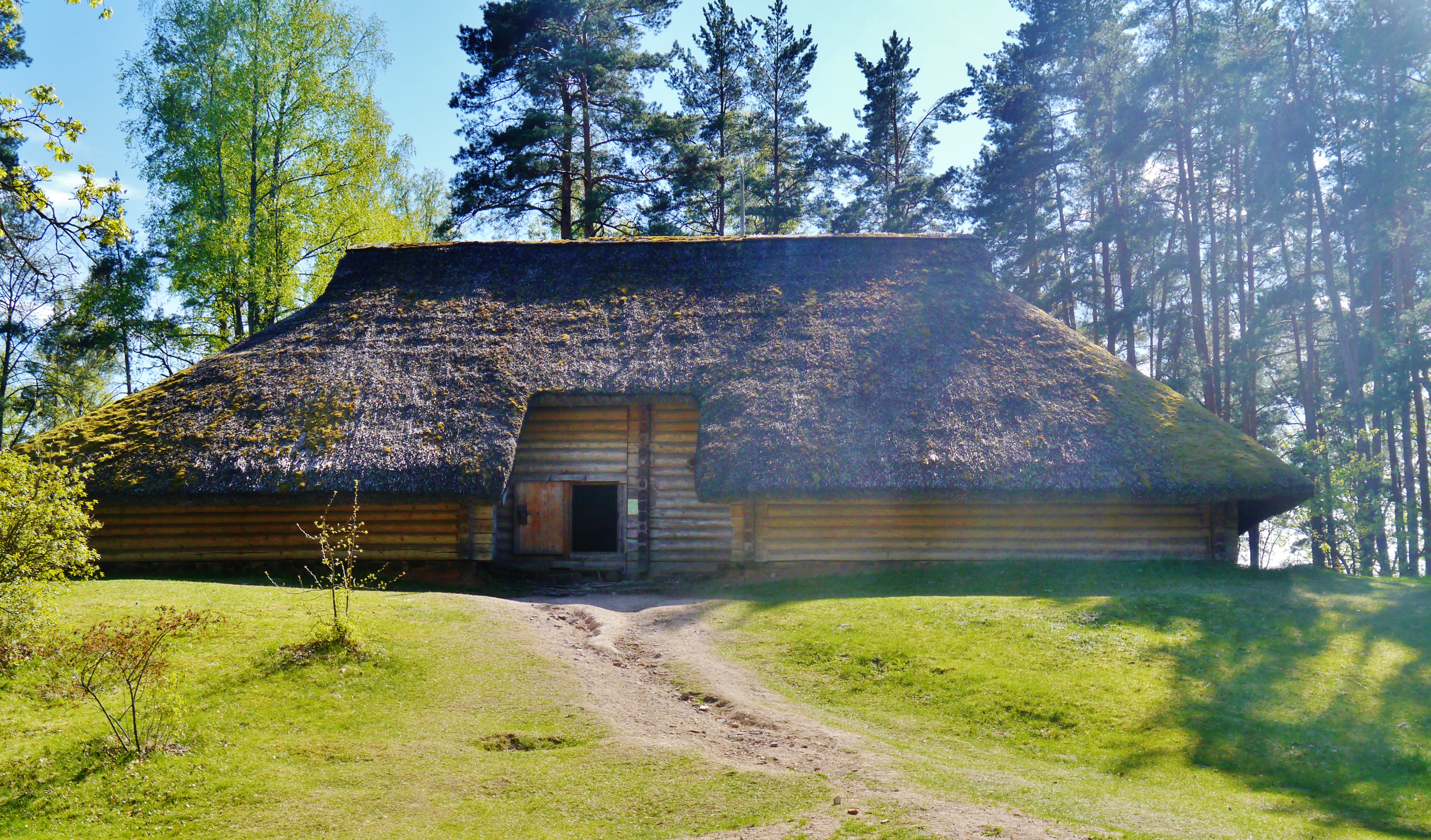
A threshing barn built in 1730 in Rizgas, Vestiena Parish, Vidzeme and the first building to be transported and re-assembled at The Ethnographic Open-Air Museum of Latvia in 1928

- The Ethnographic Open-Air Museum of Latvia
- Āraiši lake fortress

=== Lithuania ===
- Europos Parkas – museum of worlds contemporary art set in nature
- Rumšiškės open-air ethnographic museum

=== Moldova ===
- Village Museum, Chișinău

=== Netherlands ===
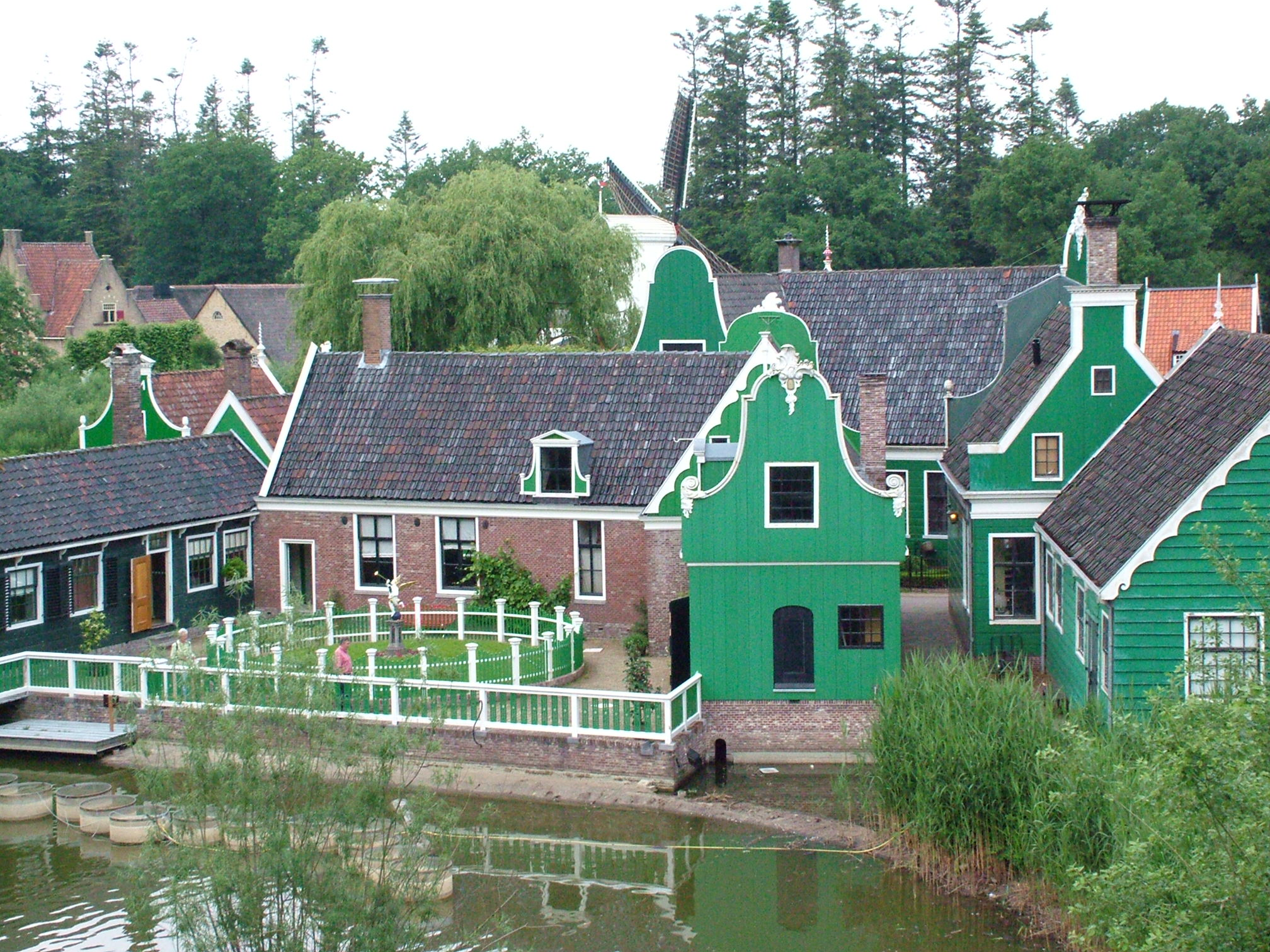
Dutch Open Air Museum

- Dutch Open Air Museum - Arnhem, Gelderland
- Archeon - Alphen aan den Rijn, South Holland
- De Spitkeet - Harkema, Friesland
- Limburgs Openluchtmuseum Eynderhoof - Nederweert-Eind, Limburg
- Eindhoven Museum - Eindhoven, North Brabant
- Hunebedcentrum - Borger, Drenthe
- Museum Village Orvelte - Orvelte, Drenthe
- Openluchtmuseum De Duinhuisjes - Rockanje, South Holland
- Ellert en Brammert - Schoonoord, Drenthe
- Erve Kots - Lievelde, Gelderland
- Openluchtmuseum Het Hoogeland - Warffum, Groningen
- It Damshûs - Nij Beets, Friesland
- Openluchtmuseum Ootmarsum - Ootmarsum Overijssel
- Van Gogh Village Nuenen - Nuenen North Brabant
- Zaanse Schans - Zaandam, North Holland
- Zuiderzee Museum - Enkhuizen, North Holland

=== North Macedonia ===
- Tumba Madžari

=== Norway ===
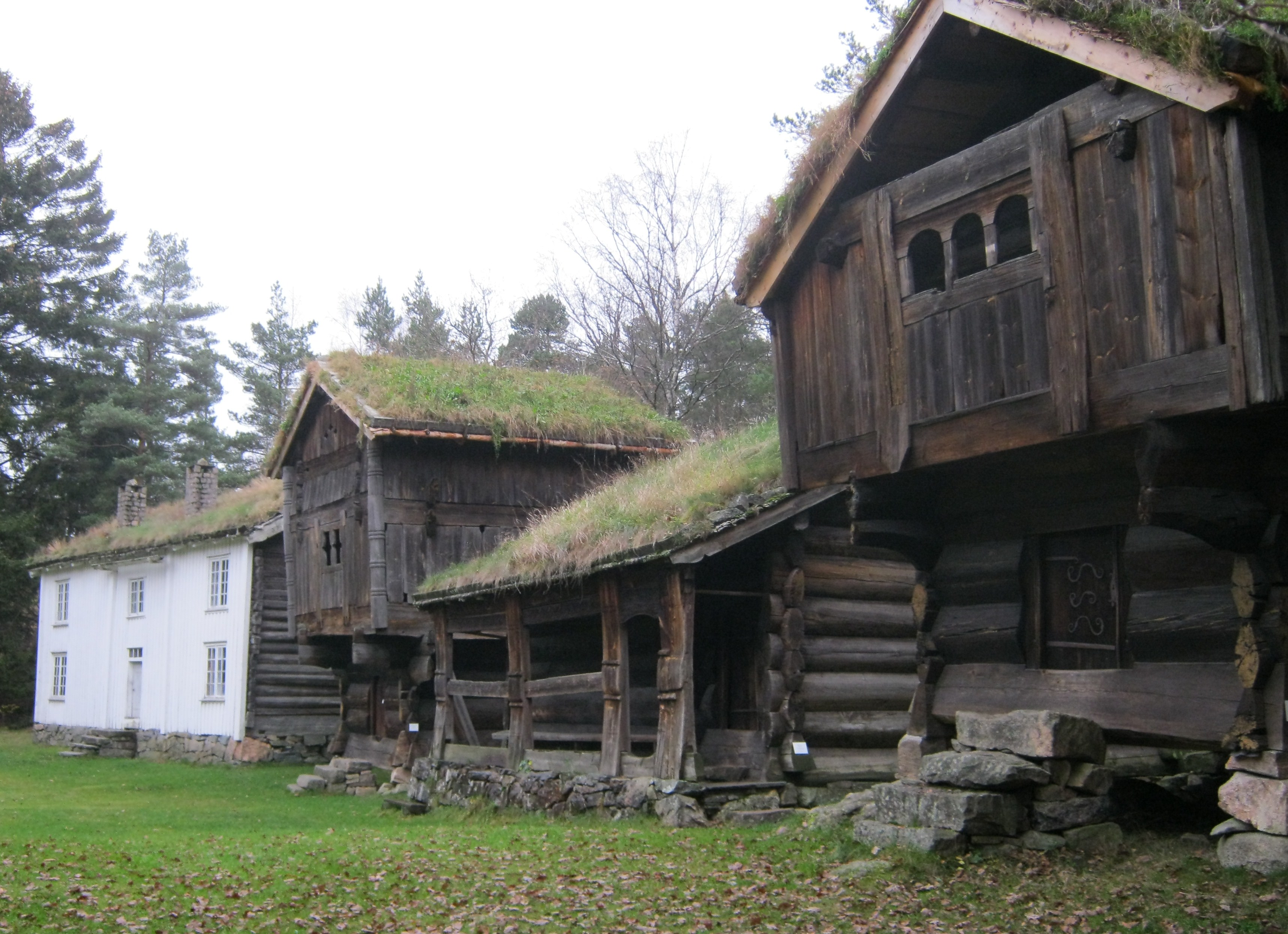
Setesdalstunet, Vest-Agder Museum in Kristiansand

- Agatunet (see Norwegian language site Agatunet)
- Bjørgan parsonage, Kvikne
- Dølmotunet, Tolga (see North Østerdalen Museums)
- Folldal Bygdetun - Uppigard Streitlien, Folldal (see North Østerdalen Museums)
- Folldal Gruver, Folldal (see Norwegian language site Folldal Gruver)
- The Heiberg Collection, Kaupanger (see Norwegian language site De Heibergske Samlinger)
- Husantunet, Alvdal (see North Østerdalen Museums)
- Norwegian Museum of Cultural History, Oslo
- Maihaugen, Lillehammer
- Os Museum - Oddentunet, Os (see North Østerdalen Museums)
- Romsdal Museum, Molde
- Rendalen Village Museum, Rendalen (see North Østerdalen Museums)
- Trøndelag folkemuseum, Sverresborg, Trondheim
- Tylldalen Bygdetun, Tylldalen (see North Østerdalen Museums)
- Tynset Bygdemuseum, Tynset (see North Østerdalen Museums)
- Vest-Agder Museum, Kristiansand
- Vollan Gård, Kvikne (see Norwegian language site Vollan gård)

=== Poland ===
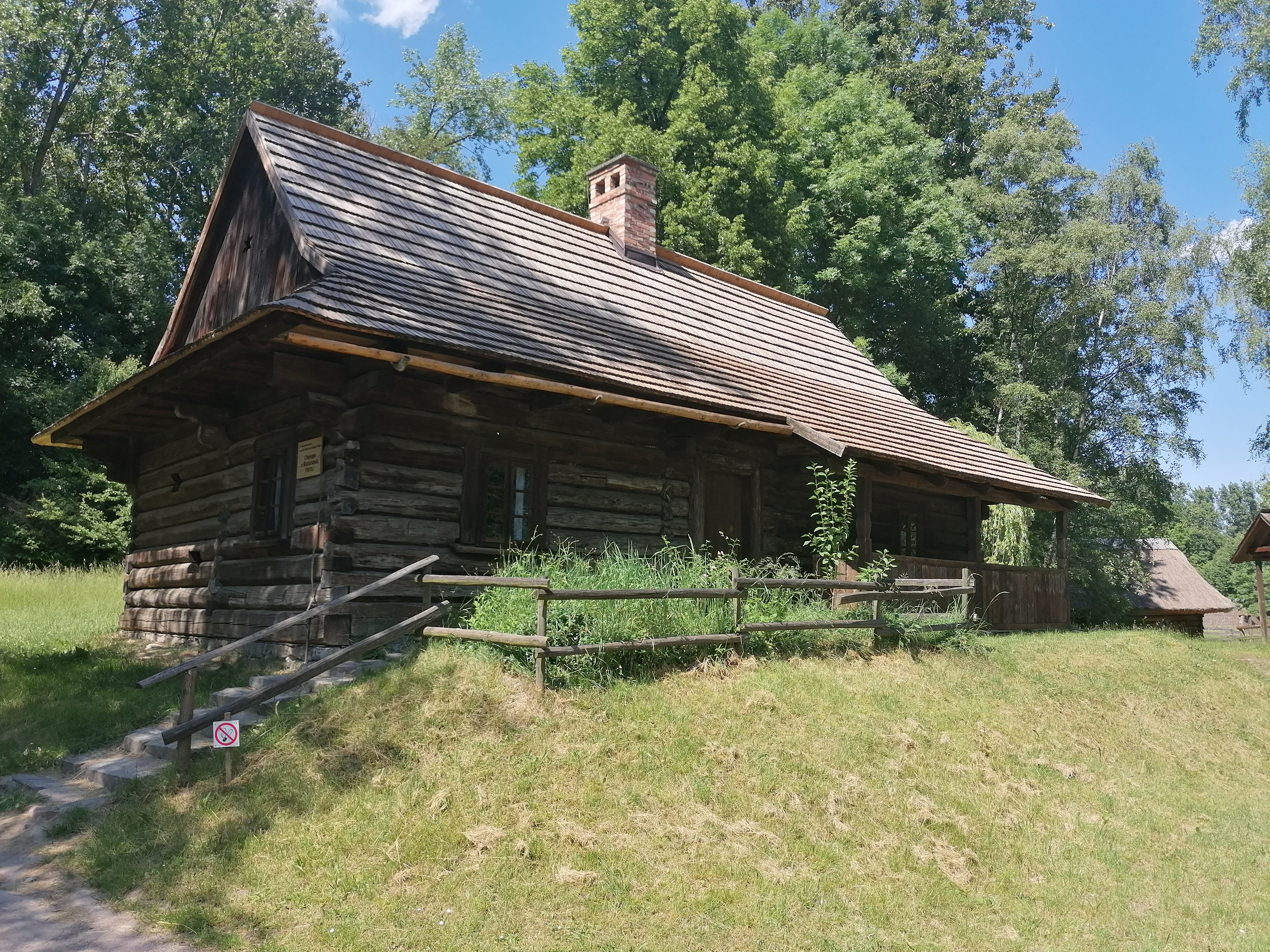
Upper Silesian Ethnographic Park, Poland

- Biskupin Archaeological Museum (Muzeum Archeologiczne w Biskupinie), about 90 kilometres (56 miles) northeast of Poznań
- Grodzisko Owidz|reconstruction of early medieval Slavic wooden stronghold, Owidz
- Ethnographic open-air museum in Sanok (Muzeum Budownictwa Ludowego w Sanoku), Sanok
- Folk Architecture Museum (Park Etnograficzny w Olsztynku), Olsztynek
- Kashubian Ethnographic Park (Kaszubski Park Etnograficzny), Wdzydze Kiszewskie
- Kujawy and Dobrzyń Land Ethnographic Park, Kłóbka
- Museum of the Slovincian Village, Kluki
- Muzeum Kultury Ludowej w Kolbuszowej, Kolbuszowa
- Muzeum Etnograficzny w Zielonej Górze z siedzibą w Ochlii, Ochla, Lubusz Voivodeship
- Muzeum Kultury Ludowej, Osiek nad Notecią
- Muzeum Wsi Lubelskiej w Lublinie, Lublin
- Muzeum Wsi Mazowieckiej w Sierpcu, Sierpc
- Muzeum Wsi Radomskiej w Radomiu, Radom
- Nadwiślański Park Etnograficzny, Wygiełzów
- Open-air Museum of the Łódź Wooden Architecture
- Orawski Park Etnograficzny, Zubrzyca Górna
- Podlaskie Museum of Folk Culture, Wasilków
- Skansen Budownictwa Ludowego Zachodniej Wielkopolski, Wolsztyn
- Skansen Etnograficzny w Russowie, Russów
- Upper Silesian Ethnographic Park, Chorzów
- Ethnographic park of Dziekanowice, Dziekanowice
- Railway Museum Chabowka, Chabówka Rolling-Stock Heritage Park "Skansen", Chabowka
- The Sądecki Ethnographic Park, Nowy Sącz
- The Opole Open-Air Museum of Rural Architecture, Opole

=== Romania ===
- ASTRA National Museum Complex, Sibiu
- Reșița Steam Locomotive Museum, Reșița
- Transylvanian Museum of Ethnography, Cluj-Napoca
- Village Museum "Dimitrie Gusti" - Muzeul Național al Satului "Dimitrie Gusti", Bucharest
- Banat Village Museum - Muzeul Satului Bănățean, Timișoara
- Museum of folk art and ethnography - Muzeul Satului din Baia Mare, Baia Mare
- Village Museum - Muzeul Satului Petrești Vrancea, Petrești Vrancea
- Museum "Haszmann Pál", Cernatu de Sus
- Museum of folk architecture - Muzeul Arhitecturii Populare, Gorj
- Ethnographic museum - Muzeul Etnografic, Reghin
- Maramureș Village Museum, Sighetu Marmației
- Bucovina Village Museum - Muzeul Satului Bucovinean, Suceava
- Ednomon - Virtual Museum of Ethnographical Monuments in Romanian Open Air Museums
- Goleşti Viticulture And Tree Growing Museum, Golești

=== Russia ===
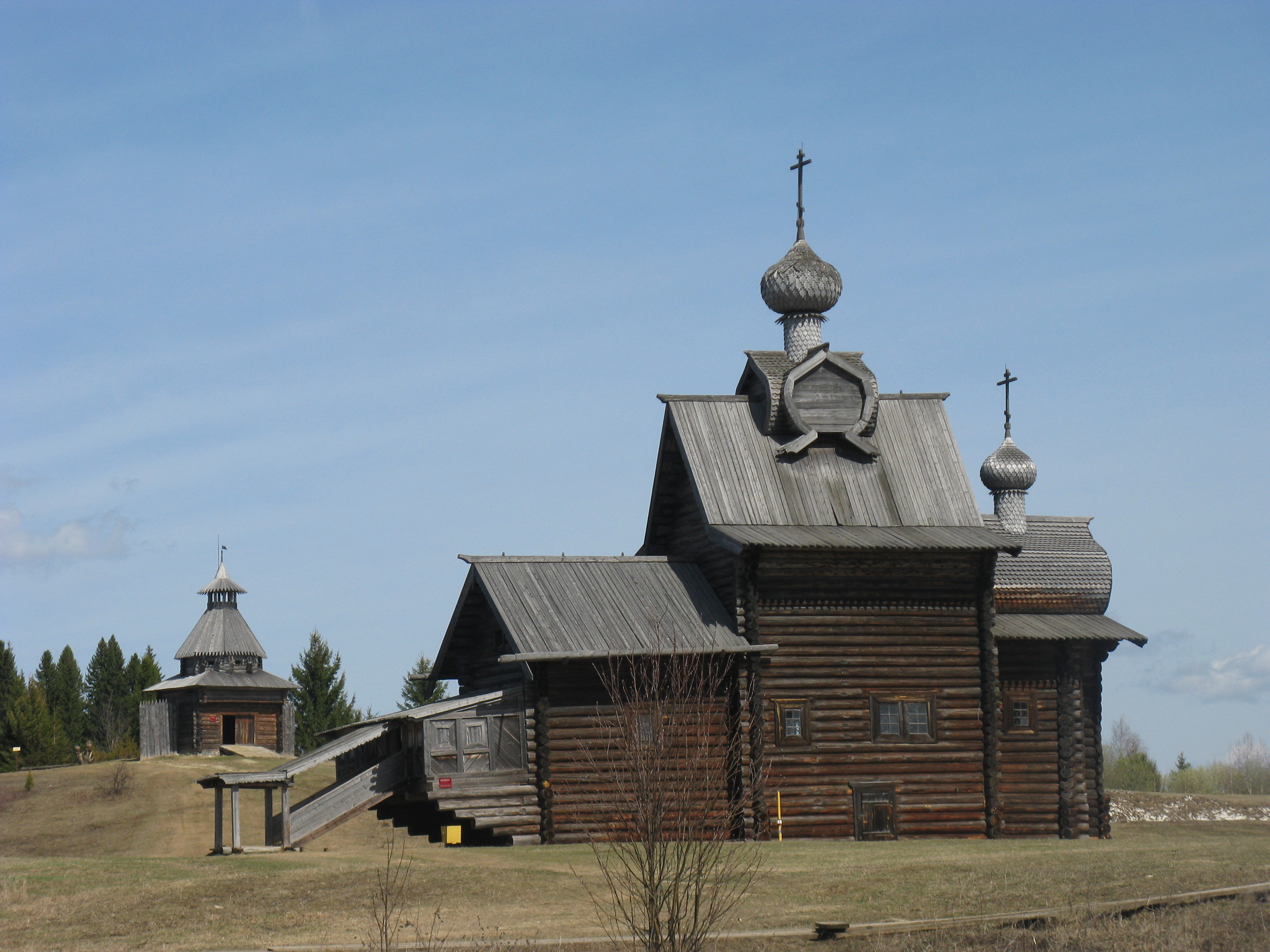
Architectural-ethnographic museum "Khokhlovka", Perm Krai

- Gornoknyazevsk
- Architectural-ethnographic museum "Khokhlovka", Perm
- Kizhi, Kizhi island
- Kolomenskoye, Moscow
- Museum of wooden architecture and folk art "Malye Korely", Arkhangelsk
- Semenkovo http://www.semenkovo.ru
- Ethnographic open air museum "Torum Maa", Khanty-Mansiysk
- "Vitoslavlitsy" museum of wooden architecture, Veliky Novgorod
- Natural Ethnographic Park museum "Zhivun", Khanty-Muzhi, Shuryshkarsky District

=== Serbia ===
- Drvengrad (Mećavnik, Küstendorf), Mokra Gora (Zlatibor)
- Staro selo (Old Village open-air museum), Sirogojno (Zlatibor)

=== Slovakia ===
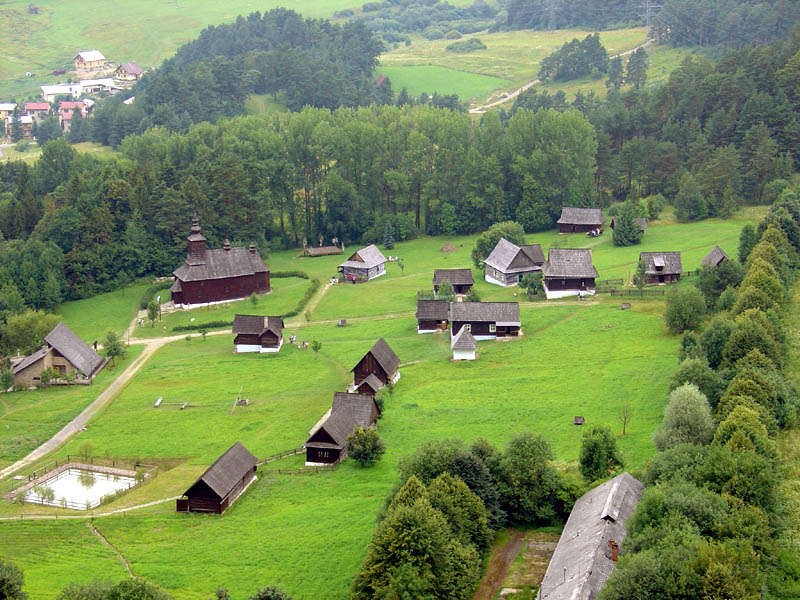
Open-air museum in Stará Ľubovňa, Slovakia.

- Banská Štiavnica
- Bardejov
- Humenné
- Kysuce Village Museum, Nova Bystrica
- Museum of folk architecture, Čičmany
- Museum of Liptov Village, Pribylina
- Museum of the Slovak Village, Múzeum Slovenskej Dediny, Martin
- Slovak Agricultural Museum, Nitra
- Ľubovňa Museum
- Svidník
- Vlkolínec
- Zuberec – Brestová, Orava Village Museum

=== Slovenia ===
- Piran
- Rogatec
- Velika Planina

=== Spain ===
- Museo de Escultura al Aire Libre de Alcalá de Henares, Alcalá de Henares
- Museu d'escultures del Bosc de Can Ginebreda, Porqueres (Girona)
- Poble Espanyol, Barcelona
- Numantia, , Garray, Soria

=== Sweden ===
- Foteviken Museum, Höllviken
- Gamla Linköping, Linköping
- Jamtli, Östersund
- Julita skans, Julita
- Kosta Boda glassworks, Kosta, Sweden
- Kulturen, Lund
- Kulturens Östarp, Östarp
- Skansen, Stockholm
- Torekällberget, Södertälje

=== Switzerland ===
- Ballenberg, Brienz

=== Turkey ===
- Ihlara
- Derinkuyu Underground City
- Kaymaklı Underground City
- Göreme
- Ürgüp
- Karatepe-Aslantaş Open Air Museum

=== Ukraine ===
- Baturyn Fortress Citadel, Baturyn
- Mamayeva Sloboda Cossack village Museum, Kyiv
- Open-air Museum of Architecture and Ethnography in Pyrohiv, Kyiv
- Museum of Folk Architecture and Culture, (see Kryvka Church), Lviv
- Museum of Folk Architecture and Life, Uzhhorod
- Museum of Folk Life and Architecture, Pereiaslav
- National Reserve Khortytsia, Zaporizja
- Museum "Old Village", Kolochava
- Historical and ethnographic museum, Sarny
- Museum of Folk Architecture and Life, Chernivtsi

=== United Kingdom ===
==== England ====
- Anne of Cleves House, Lewes
- Avoncroft Museum of Historic Buildings, Worcestershire
- Amberley Working Museum, Amberley, West Sussex
- Beamish, North of England Open Air Museum, Beamish, County Durham
- Black Country Living Museum, Dudley, West Midlands
- Blists Hill Victorian Town, Telford, Shropshire
- Butser Ancient Farm, Chalton, Hampshire
- Chiltern Open Air Museum, Chalfont St. Giles, Buckinghamshire
- Church Farm Museum, Agricultural museum and collection of indigenous buildings, Skegness
- Cogges Manor Farm Museum, Witney, Oxfordshire
- Little Woodham, Gosport, Hampshire
- Manor Farm Country Park, Bursledon, Hampshire
- Milestones Museum, Basingstoke, Hampshire
- Morwellham Quay, Devon
- Murton Park / Yorkshire Museum of Farming in Murton, York
- Museum of East Anglian Life, Stowmarket, Suffolk
- National Coal Mining Museum for England, Wakefield, West Yorkshire
- Rural Life Living Museum, Tilford, Surrey
- Ryedale Folk Museum, North York Moors, North Yorkshire
- Weald and Downland Open Air Museum, Sussex
- West Stow Anglo-Saxon Village, Suffolk
- West Yorkshire Folk Museum, in grounds of Shibden Hall, Halifax
- Wimpole Home Farm, Cambridgeshire
- York Castle Museum, York

==== Scotland ====
- National Museum of Rural Life, East Kilbride, Lanarkshire
- Scottish Crannog Centre at Loch Tay, Perth and Kinross
- Auchindrain – near Inveraray, Argyll and Bute
- The Gearrannan Blackhouses, Isle of Lewis
- Skye Museum of Island Life, near Kilmuir, Isle of Skye,
- Highland Folk Museum, Newtonmore
- Industrial open-air museum of New Lanark

==== Wales ====
- St Fagans National History Museum, St Fagans, Cardiff
- Castell Henllys, Nevern, Pembrokeshire
- Cosmeston Medieval Village, Cosmeston Lakes, Vale of Glamorgan

==== Northern Ireland ====
- Ulster American Folk Park, Castleton, County Tyrone
- Ulster Folk & Transport Museum, Cultra, County Down

== North America ==
=== Canada ===
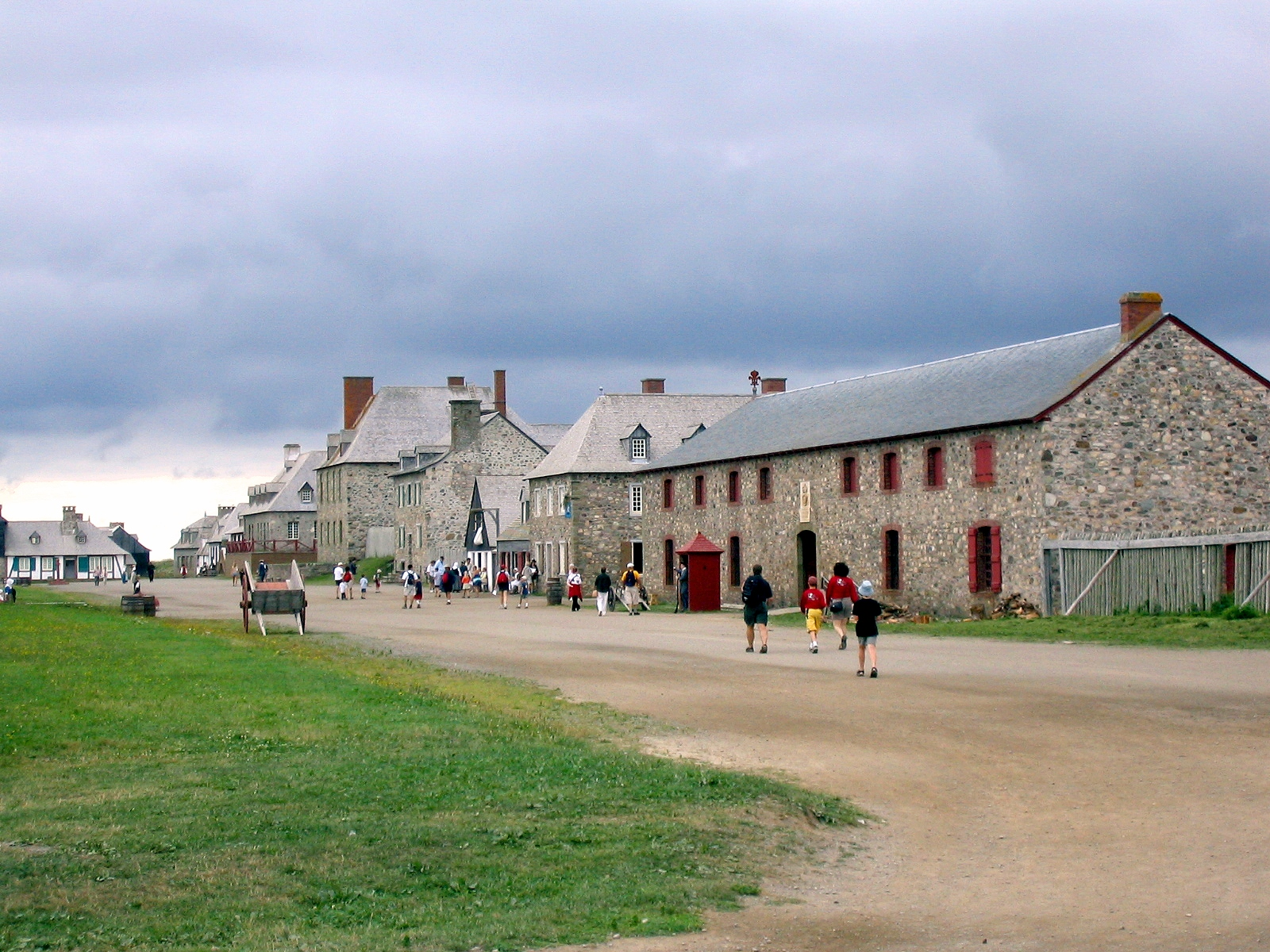
Fortress Louisbourg, Nova Scotia

- Barkerville, British Columbia
- Ball's Falls Conservation Area, Jordan, Ontario
- The Village at Black Creek, Toronto, Ontario
- Bronte Creek Provincial Park (Spruce Lane Farmhouse), Oakville, Ontario
- Burnaby Village Museum, Burnaby, British Columbia
- Canada's Polish Kashub Heritage Museum & Skansen, Wilno, Ontario
- Discovery Harbour, Penetanguishene, Ontario
- Doon Heritage Village, Kitchener, Ontario
- Fanshawe Pioneer Village, London, Ontario
- Fort Henry, Ontario
- Fort Edmonton Park, Edmonton, Alberta
- Fort Langley National Historic Site, Fort Langley, British Columbia
- Fortress of Louisbourg, Louisbourg, Nova Scotia
- Fort William Historical Park, Thunder Bay, Ontario
- Fort York, Toronto, Ontario
- Greater Sudbury Heritage Museums
- Halifax Citadel National Historic Site of Canada (Citadel Hill), Halifax, Nova Scotia
- Highland Village Museum, Iona, Nova Scotia
- Heritage Park Historical Village, Calgary, Alberta
- Kalyna Country, an ecomuseum
- Kawartha Settlers' Village, Bobcaygeon, Ontario
- Kings Landing Historical Settlement, Prince William, New Brunswick
- Lang Pioneer Village Museum, Peterborough, Ontario
- Muskoka Heritage Place, Huntsville, Ontario
- Lower Fort Garry National Historic Site, Selkirk, Manitoba
- Markham Museum, Markham, Ontario
- Mennonite Heritage Village, Steinbach, Manitoba
- Murney Tower, Kingston, Ontario
- Sainte-Marie among the Hurons, Midland, Ontario
- Sherbrooke Village, Sherbrooke, Nova Scotia
- Ukrainian Cultural Heritage Village, Alberta
- Upper Canada Village, Morrisburg, Ontario
- Village Historique Acadien, Caraquet, New Brunswick
- Village Québécois d'Antan, Drummondville, Quebec
- Railway Museum of British Columbia, Squamish, British Columbia
- Westfield Heritage Village, Rockton, Ontario
- Pickering Museum Village, Pickering, Ontario

=== Mexico ===
- Parque-Museo La Venta, Villahermosa, Tabasco

== Oceania ==
=== Australia ===
- The Pioneer Settlement, Swan Hill, Victoria, Australia's First Open Air Museum, opened 1966.
- Old Gippstown, Moe, Victoria opened 1973
- Port Arthur, Tasmania
- Sovereign Hill, Ballarat, Victoria
- Millewa Pioneer Forest and Historical Village, Meringur, Victoria
- Flagstaff Hill Maritime Museum, Warrnambool, Victoria
- Old Sydney Town, Somersby, New South Wales (now closed)
- Miles Historical Village and Museum, Miles, Queensland
- Old Tailem Town, Tailem Bend, South Australia
- Australiana Pioneer Village, Wilberforce, NSW

=== New Zealand ===
- Ferrymead, Christchurch a recreation of a 1900 -1920 settlement in Canterbury, complete with homes, stores, shops and working steam trains
- Howick Colonial Village, Auckland, an authentic 1850s Fencible village featuring old homes, stores and community halls. There is also occasional re creation days with volunteers in period dress
- Shantytown, Greymouth, a Historic theme park opened in 1971 dedicated to the 1860s to 1900s Gold rush on the West Coast. The sheltered location includes several old time stores, printing press and a small model train that goes into a gully, you can also pan for Gold and take it home with you.
- Cobblestones, Greytown, is a living history open-air Victorian village and museum that showcases the lives of early settlers to Wairarapa region. Cobblestones is located in the historic town of Greytown, which also features numerous heritage buildings.
- Thames and Coromandel, this scenic region outside and near Auckland features several working mine attractions, museums and historic stores dedicated to the late 19th century gold boom in the Coromandel. Thames has several old mines, the Pump Museum and School of Mines, the Karangahake gorge features historic relics in a scenic walk and Waihi and Coromandel townships also preserve their God Rush heritage.
- Gibbs Farm - private outdoor sculpture garden developed by Alan Gibbs. Located on North Island.

== South America ==
=== Argentina ===
- Caminito

=== Brazil ===
- Museu ao ar livre de Orleans
- Inhotim

=== Suriname ===
- Fort Nieuw-Amsterdam

== Living transportation museums ==
- Brooklands in Weybridge, Elmbridge, Surrey, England (aviation and motorcar museum)
- Çamlık Railway Museum (Çamlık Tren Müzesi) in Çamlık, Turkey (railway museum)
- Chesapeake and Ohio Canal National Historical Park from Georgetown, Washington, D.C. to Cumberland, Maryland (heritage canal)
- Cumbres and Toltec Scenic Railroad from Chama, New Mexico to Antonito, Colorado (heritage railway)
- Danish Tramway Museum (Sporvejsmuseet Skjoldenæsholm) in Skjoldenæsholm, Denmark
- Delta Queen travels along the Mississippi River and tributaries (heritage river steamboat)
- Deutsches Schiffahrtsmuseum in Bremerhaven, Germany (maritime museum)
- Edaville Railroad in South Carver, Massachusetts (heritage railway)
- Hiroshima City Transportation Museum in Hiroshima, Japan (street railway museum)
- Mystic Seaport in Mystic, Connecticut (maritime museum)
- National Tramway Museum in Derbyshire, England (heritage street railway)
- Old Rhinebeck Aerodrome in Rhinebeck, New York (aviation museum)
- Roscoe Village in Coshocton, Ohio (along the former Ohio & Erie Canal, nearby Monticello III canal boat)
- San Francisco Maritime National Historical Park, San Francisco, California (includes a fleet of historic vessels)
- Seashore Trolley Museum in Kennebunkport, Maine (heritage railway)
- Shuttleworth Collection in Bedfordshire, England (aviation museum)
- Narrow Gauge Railway Museum in Wenecja near Żnin
- Skansen Parowozownia Kościerzyna in Kościerzyna, Pomeranian Voivodeship, Poland (heritage railway)
- Steamtown National Historic Site in Scranton, Pennsylvania (heritage railway)
- Valley Railroad Company in Essex, Connecticut (heritage railway)
- White Pass and Yukon Route from Skagway, Alaska to Whitehorse, Yukon (heritage railway)
- Wiscasset, Waterville and Farmington Railway in Alna, Maine (heritage railway)
- Royal Malaysian Air Force Museum, Kuala Lumpur, Malaysia (military aviation)

== Ecological and environmental living museums ==
Some ecological living museums are zoos

- California Living Museum, Bakersfield, California, United States
- Virginia Living Museum, Newport News, Virginia, United States
- Nonsuch Island Living Museum, Bermuda
- Penang Forestry Museum, Penang, Malaysia
- Ball's Falls Conservation Area, Jordan, Ontario, Canada
