= Sącz Lachs =

Group of ethnic Poles who live in southern Lesser Poland

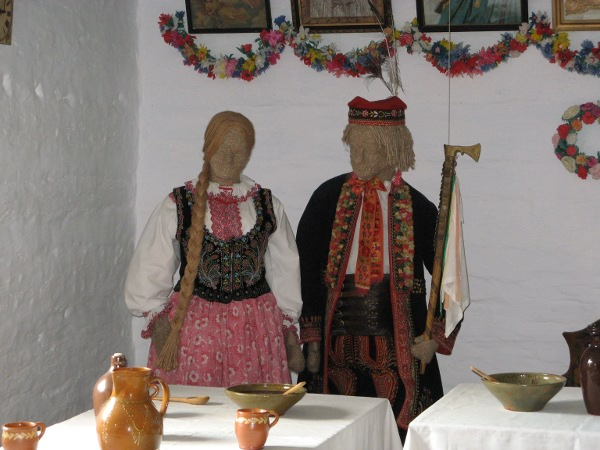
Traditional dress of the Lachy Sądeckie in the Nowy Sacz Ethnographic Park (open-air museum)

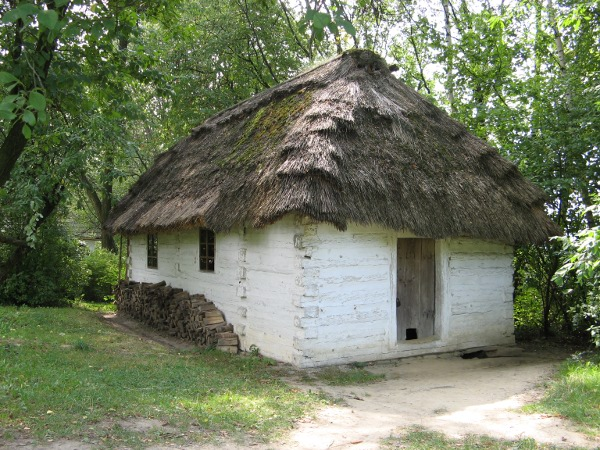
A preserved home of the rural poor in the Ethnographic Park

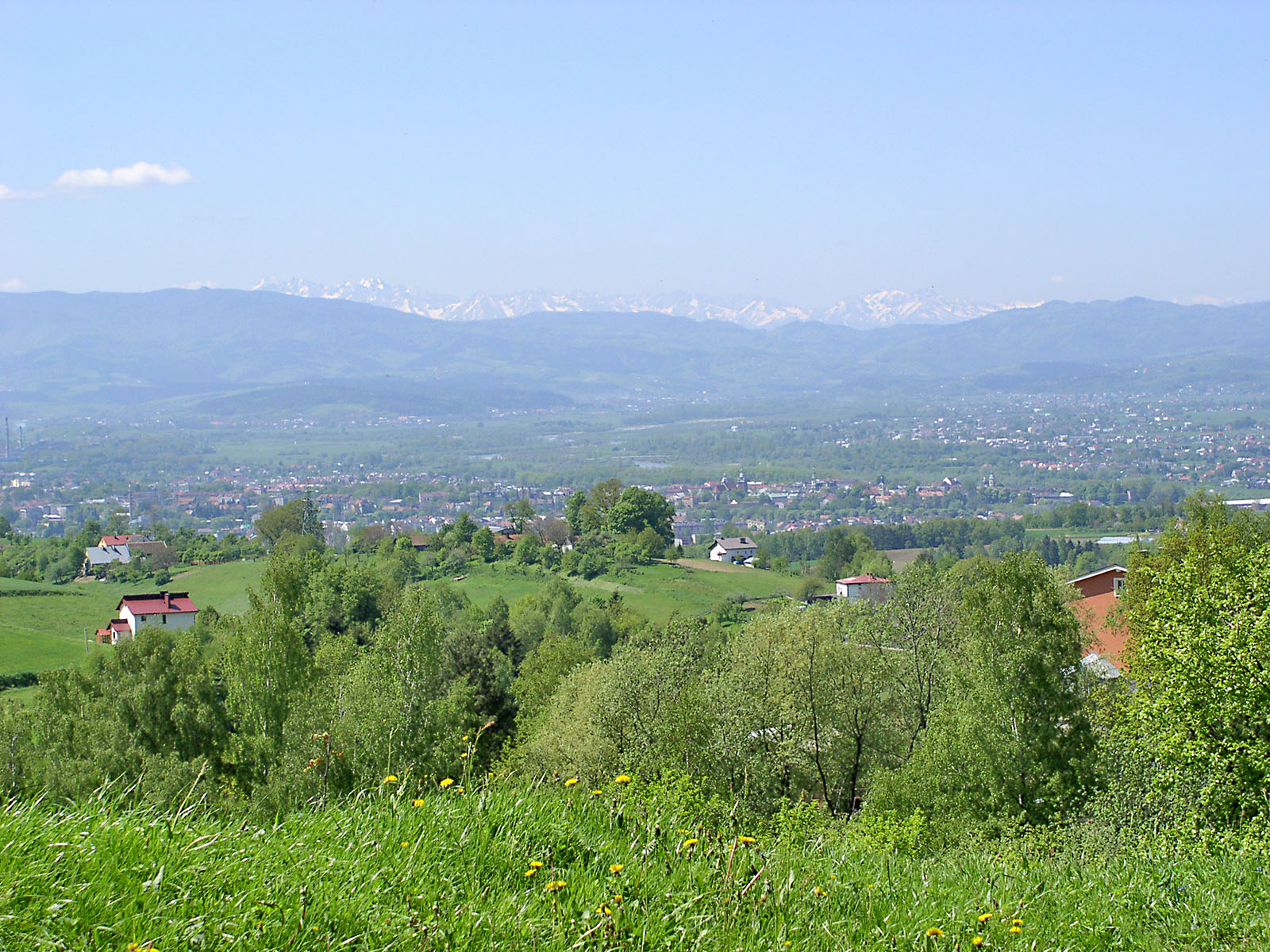
Kotlina Sądecka

Sącz Lachs (Polish: Lachy Sądeckie, [ˈlaxɨ sɔnˈdɛt͡skʲɛ]) are a group of ethnic Poles who live in southern Lesser Poland. They are associated with the territory of Sącz Region, especially Nowy Sącz County, Kotlina Sądecka, and parts of Beskids.

Lachy is a colloquial term for ethnic Poles derived from the name of the ancient Polish tribe of Lendians. Sądeckie is an adjective referring to the region where they live.

Sącz Lachs culture is featured in Muzeum of Sącz Lachs in Podegrodzie, Lesser Poland Voivodeship and Sądecki Ethnographic Park (open-air museum) in Nowy Sącz.
