= Kommern Open Air Museum =

Coordinates: 50°36′40.86″N 6°37′46.74″E

Kommern Open Air Museum / Rhenish State Museum for Folk History
- LVR-Freilichtmuseum Kommern; Rheinisches Landesmuseum für Volkskunde
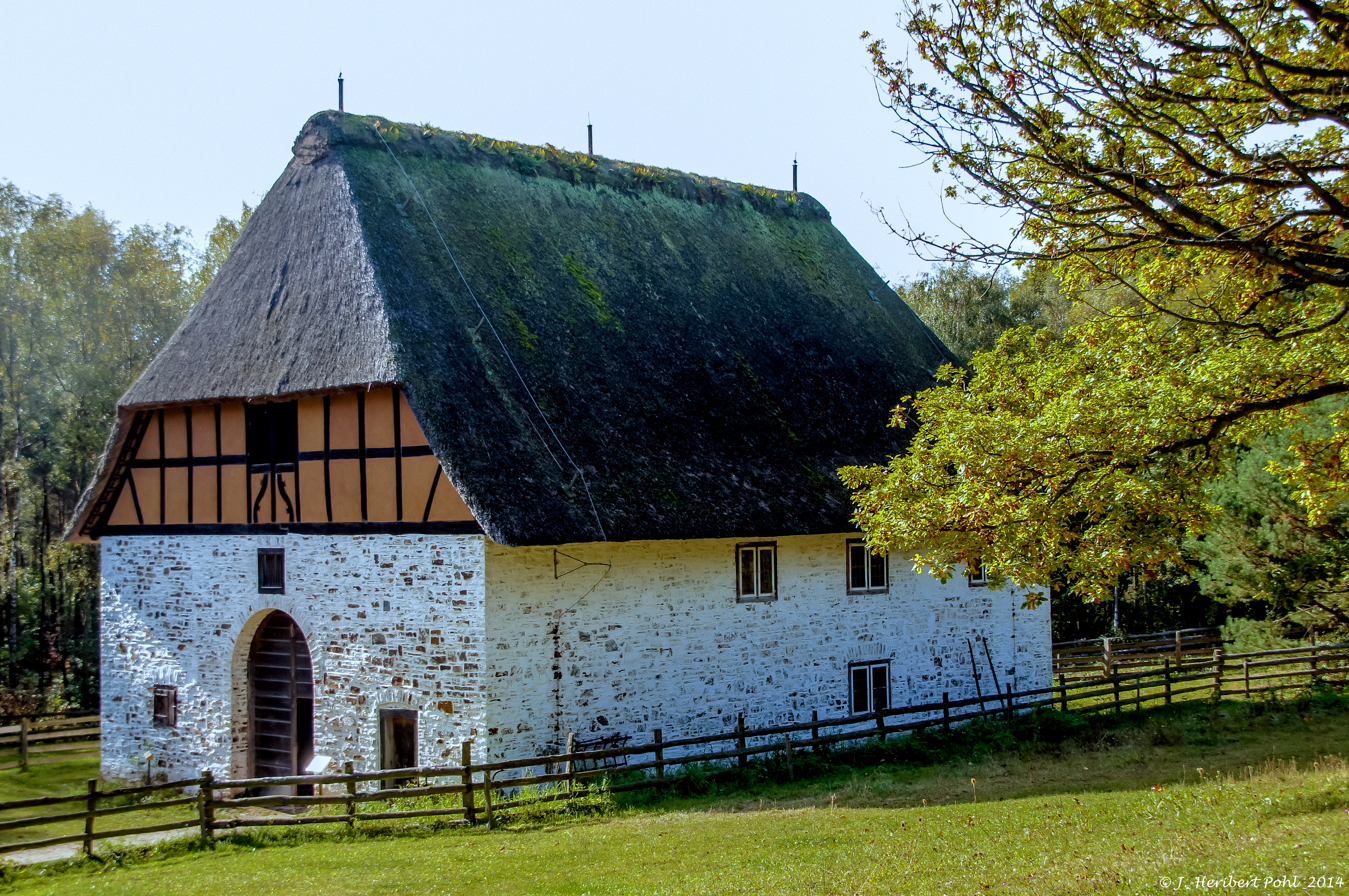
- House from Rhinschenschmidthausen in the Bergisches Land
- Established: 20 July 1961
- Location: Kommern
- Type: folk history museum
- Manager: Josef Mangold
- Website: Official website

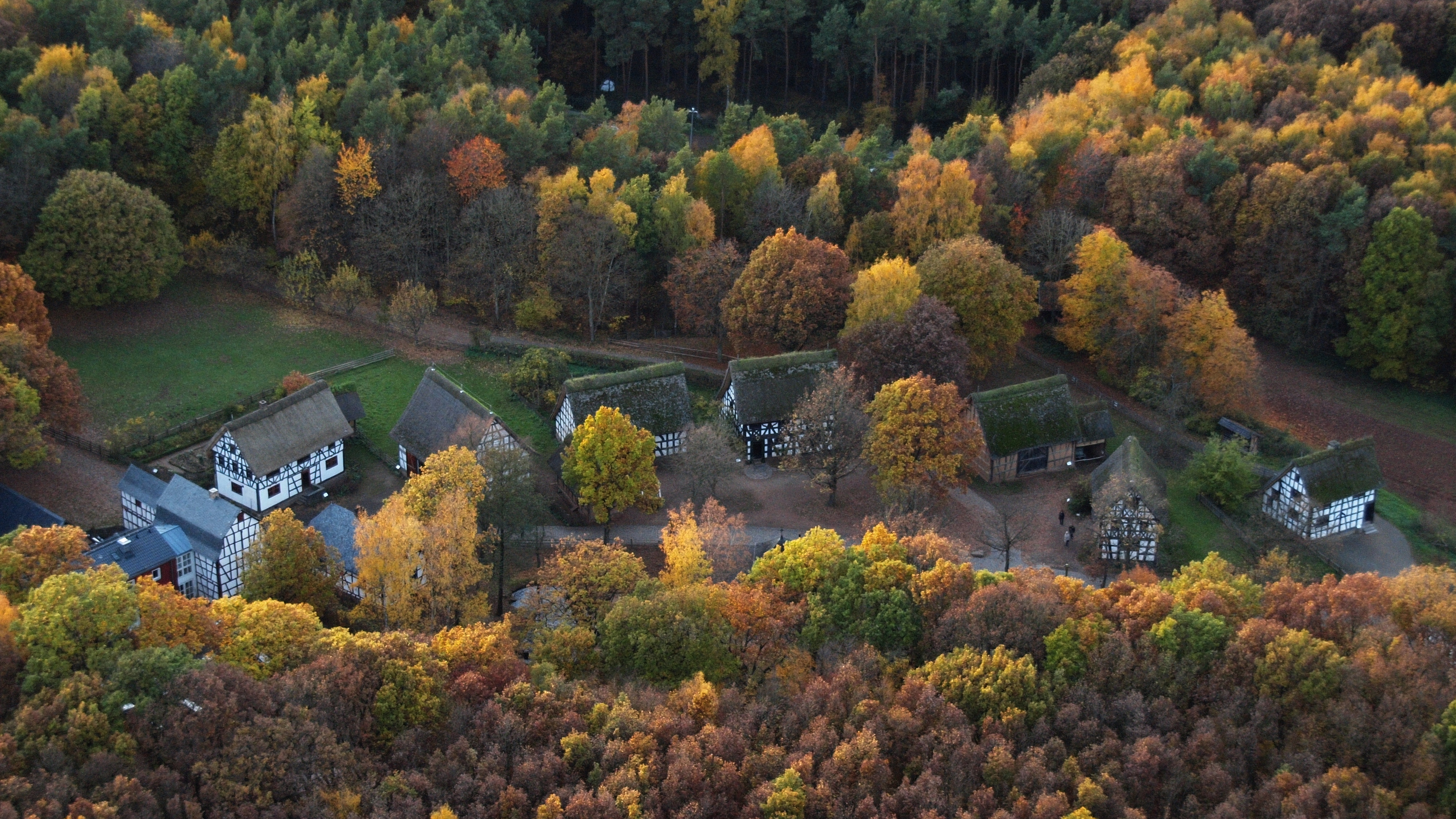
View of part of the Kommern Open Air Museum. 2015 aerial photograph

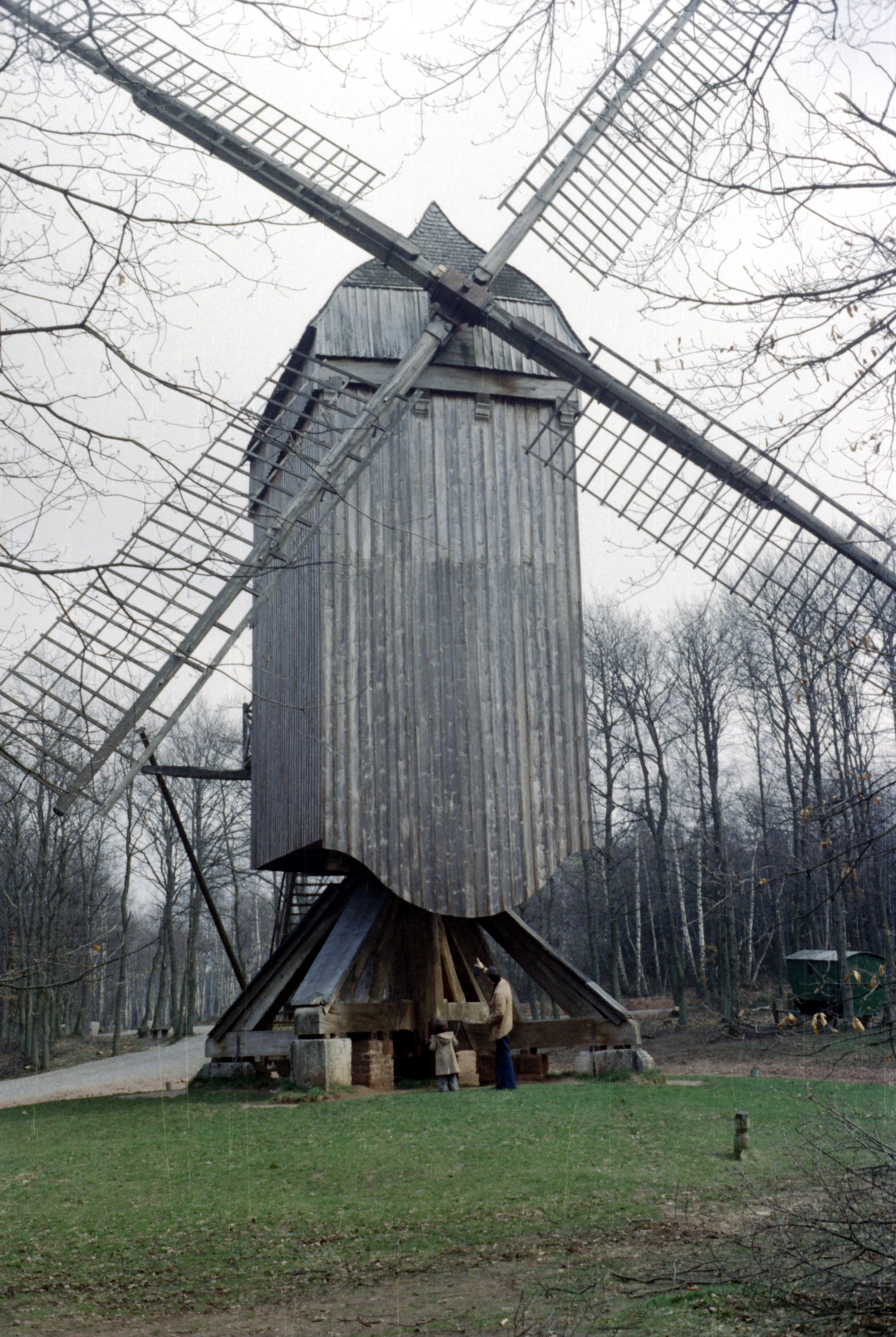
A post mill from Spiel

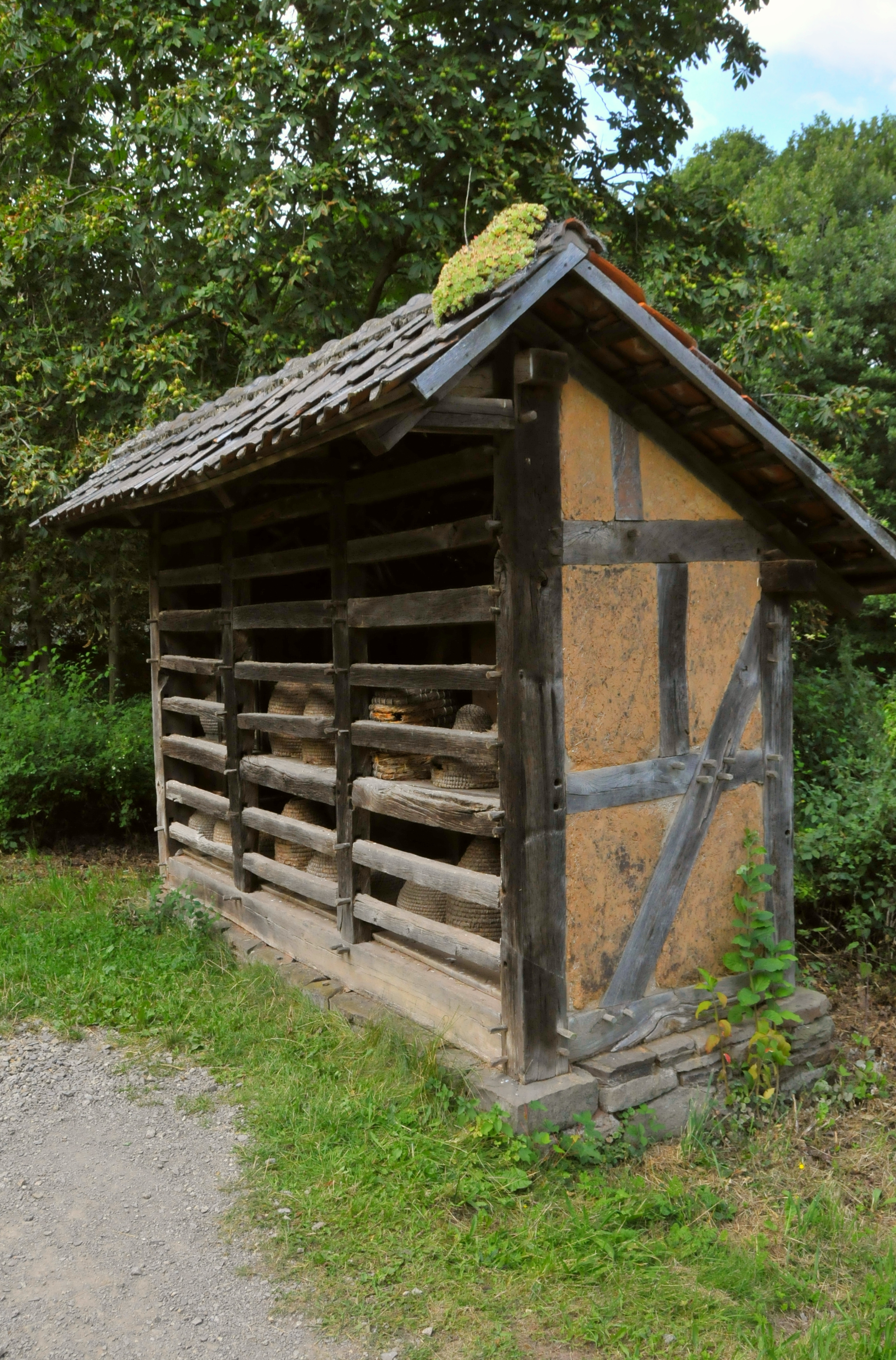
Beehive from Birkenbeul

The Kommern Open Air Museum (German: LVR-Freilichtmuseum Kommern) and Rhenish State Museum for Folk Art (Rheinische Landesmuseum für Volkskunde) in Kommern/Eifel is one of the largest open air museums in Europe, covering an area of over 95 hectares and displaying around 67 historic buildings from the Prussian Rhine Province. It is operated by the Rhineland Regional Association (Landschaftsverband Rheinland, LVR).

== History ==
The planning for an open-air museum in the Rhineland dates back to the 1950s. Approximately 30 cities, towns and villages between Aachen, Cologne and the Ruhr area, including Duisburg, Krefeld, Rheydt and Kommern (today part of Mechernich, but still independent at that time) applied for the privilege. The selection of Kommern on 28 March 1958 in a run-off election against Krefeld is said to have been thanks to the work of Kommern's Norbert Leduc. The museum was opened on 20 July 1961. Its leaders have been Adelhart Zippelius (to 1981), Dieter Pesch (1981 to 2007) and Josef Mangold (2008 to present).

== Museum ==
Around 67 buildings, including farmyards, wind mills, workshops, village community buildings like schools, bakehouses, dancing halls and chapels, all of which originated on the territory of the former Prussian Rhine Province and its predecessors, have been gathered together in four groups. Arable fields, vegetable gardens and orchards complete the picture. The exhibits come predominantly from the Westerwald/Middle Rhine region, from the Eifel mountains and Voreifel foothills, from the Lower Rhine and from the Bergisches Land. They portray everyday life from the 15th century. Under construction is another group of buildings, the Rhineland Marketplace (Marktplatz Rheinland), which illustrate the rural and small-town life of the Rhineland, both at home and work, from the 1950s to the 1980s. With that the Kommern Open Air Museum will also become a museum of everyday culture of life in the 20th century.

In addition the museum has permanent and changing exhibitions in its role as the Rhenish State Museum for Folk Culture (Rheinisches Landesmuseum für Volkskunde).

The Kommern Open Air Museum has an annual programme with around 70 special events. Major events are the Jahrmarkt anno dazumal ('Annual Market in the Year Dot'), which takes place from Easter Saturday to White Sunday, the Zeitblende ('Time Window'), which looks back 50 years to the Rhineland and the wider world, Nach der Ernte ('After the Harvest') on the third or fourth weekend in September and Advent für alle Sinne ('Advent for All Senses') in the first week of Advent.

A focal point for the museum is its living history programme. Under the motto Gespielte Geschichte ('History in Action'), actors meet the visitors in the first person as historically identifiable people or as everyday folk from a particular time and social situation and "draw" the museum guests into the past.

== Permanent exhibitions ==
WirRheinländer ('We Rhinelanders')

In this exhibition the history of the Rhineland and the live of the Rhinelanders is portrayed from the time of the French occupation in 1794 to the start of the economic miracle after 1950. The visitor walks through a historical avenue in an exhibition hall with more than 50 replica buildings from the Rhineland, in which scenarios about Rhenish history are presented.

In addition, there are several changing exhibitions.

== Photography ban ==
There is a de facto ban on photography in the museum. Private photography is permitted in principle, but any publication of photos and videos, even on non-commercial platforms, is forbidden.

== Literature ==
- LVR-Freilichtmuseum Kommern. Rheinisches Landesmuseum für Volkskunde. Museum guide, revised by Michael H. Faber. Auf der Grundlage des vorherigen Museumsführers by Joachim Hähnel, revised by Michael Faber and Manuela Schütze, Cologne, 2000. (= Führer und Schriften des LVR-Freilichtmuseums Kommern - Rheinischen Landesmuseums für Volkskunde No. 62) ISBN 978-3-00-025698-1

== Gallery ==
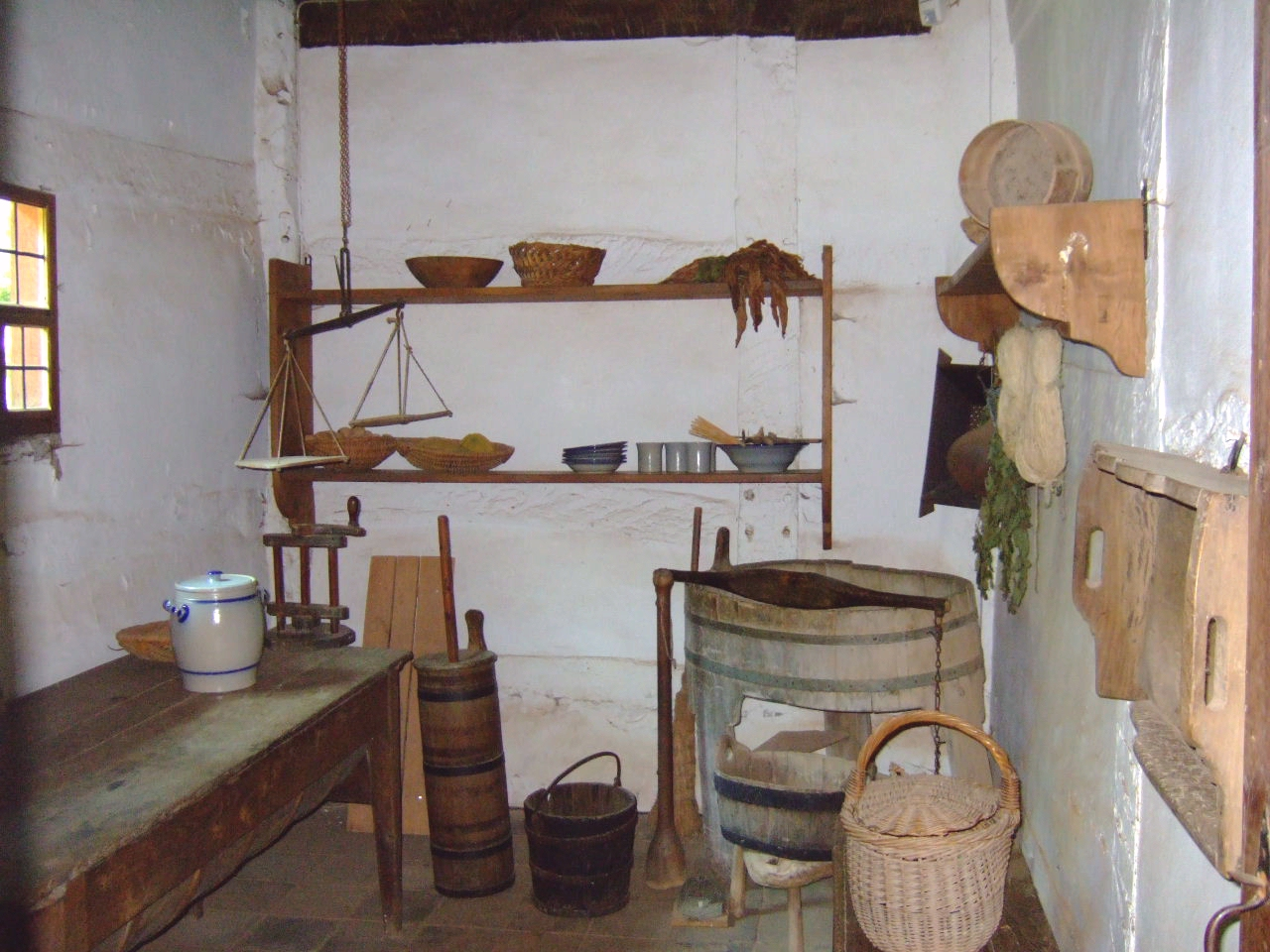
Kitchen of the 1616 house from Kessenich

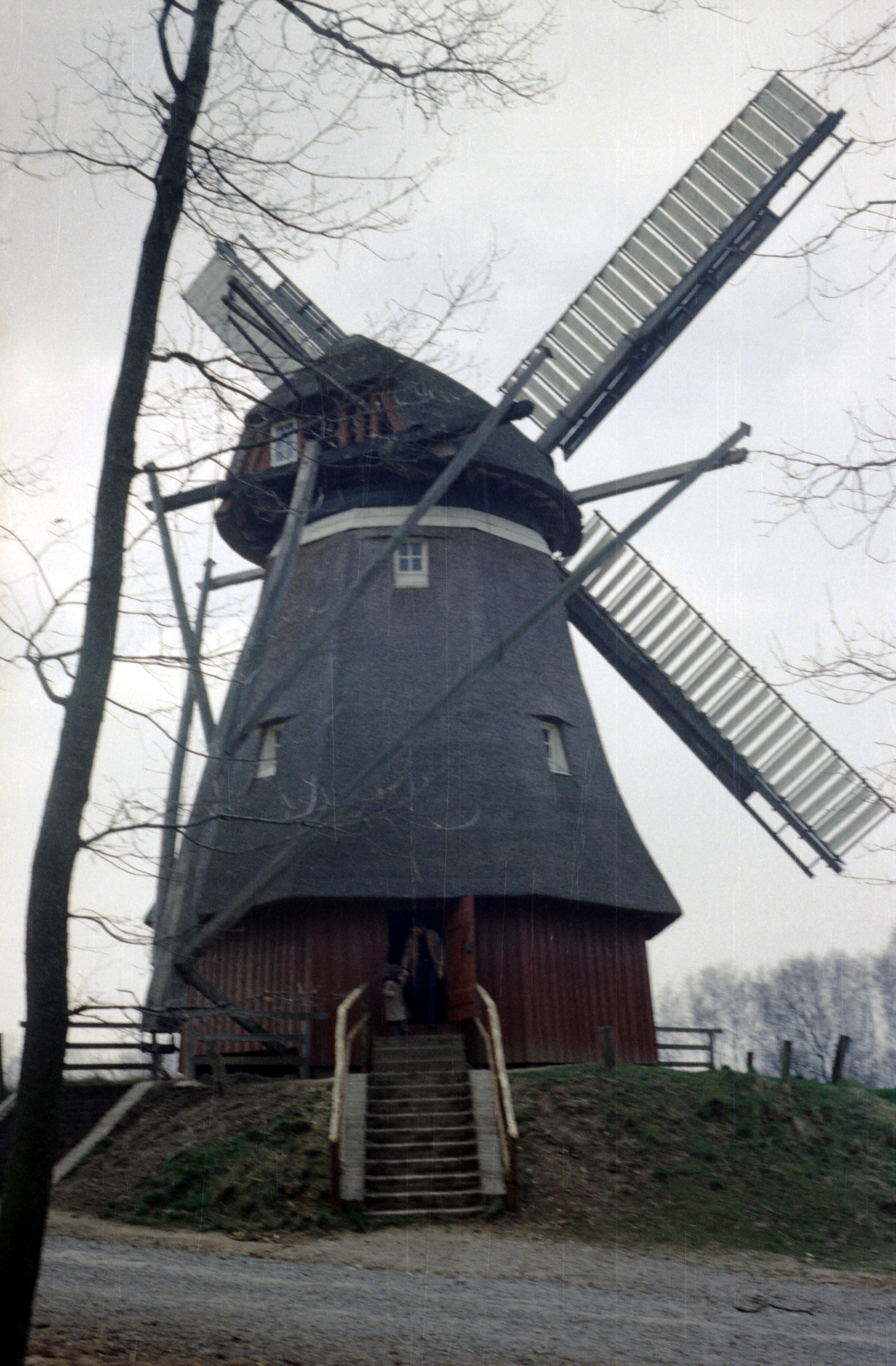
A smock mill from Cantrup

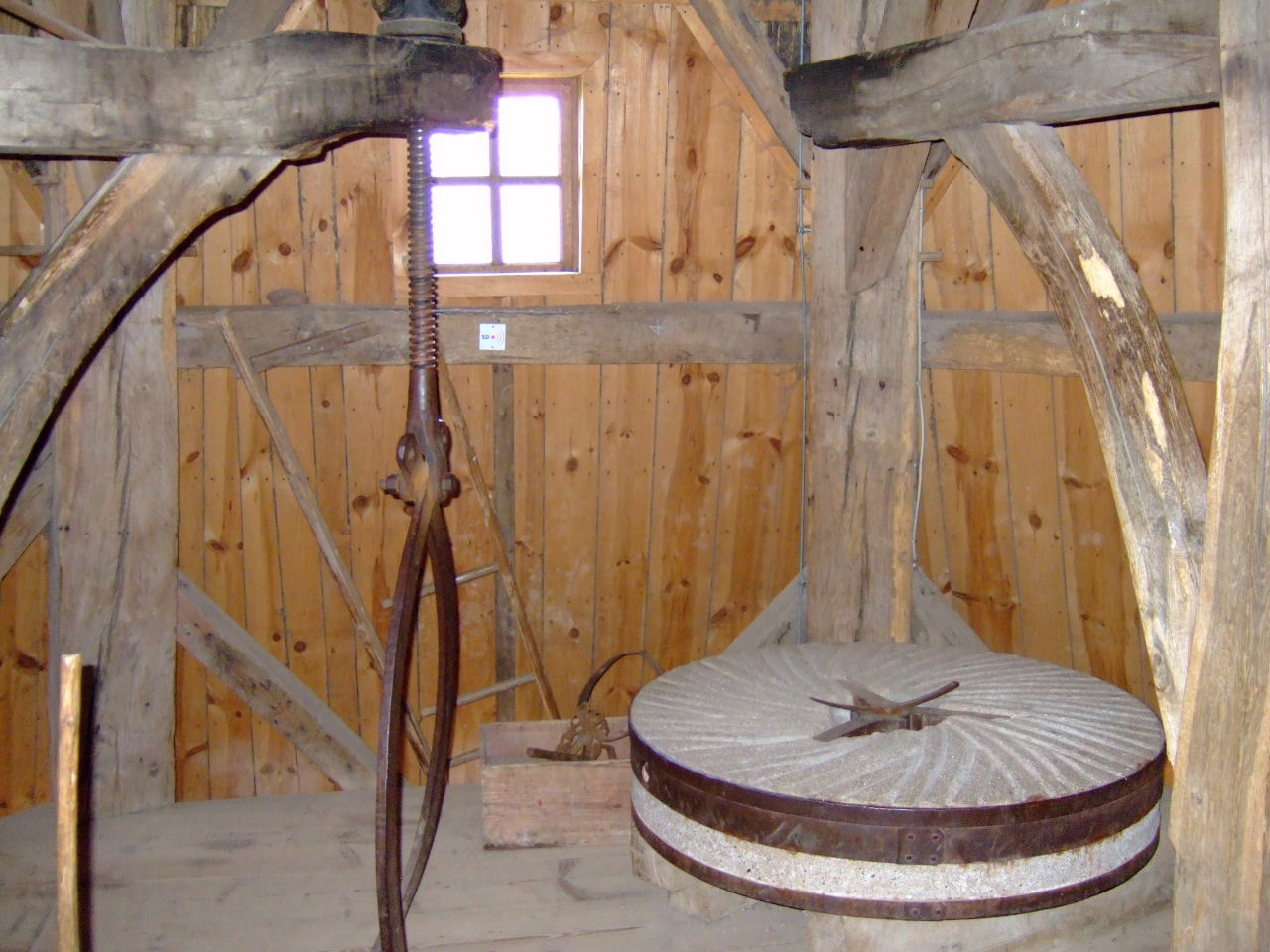
View inside the mill

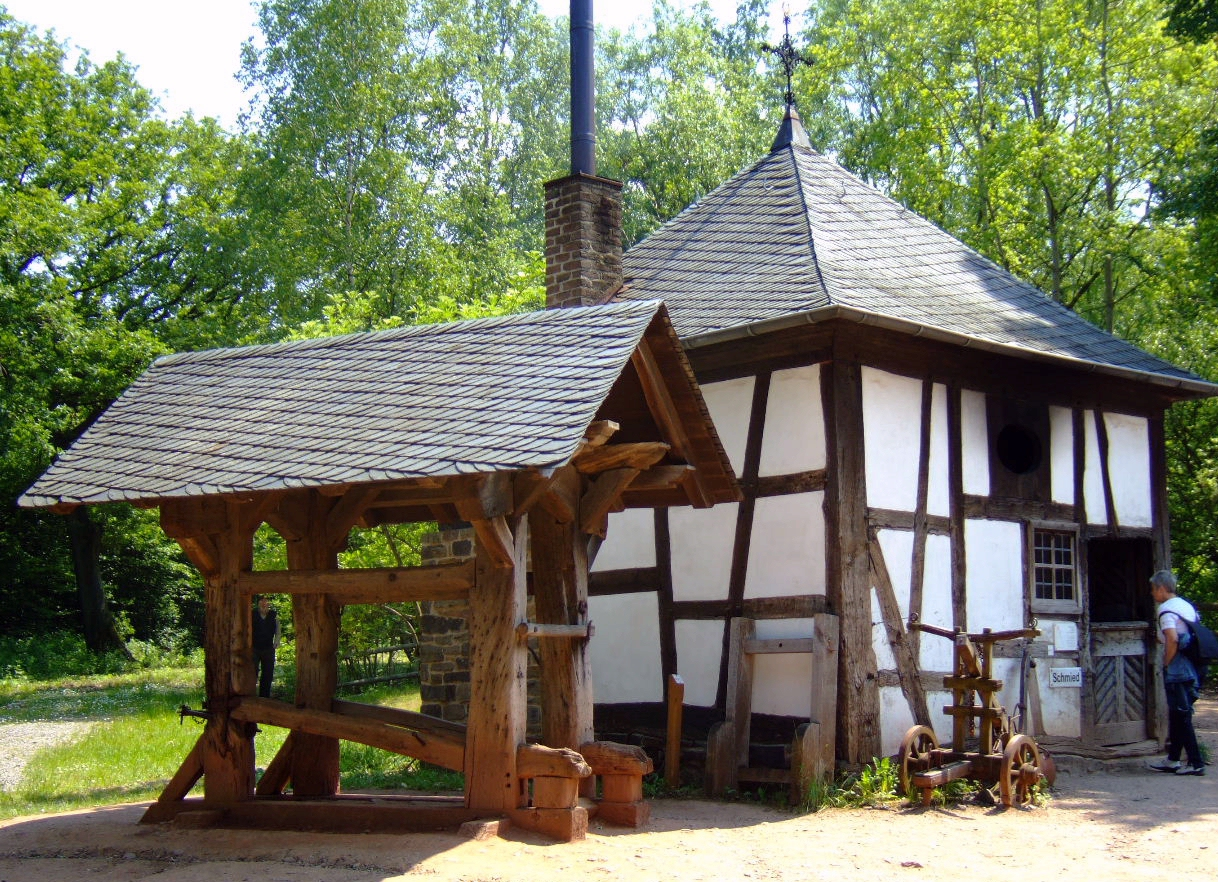
Smithy from Bornich

== See also ==
- List of European Open Air Museums
