= Museum of Rural Life in Wallonia =

Museum in Belgium

Coordinates: 50°05′28″N 5°20′04″E

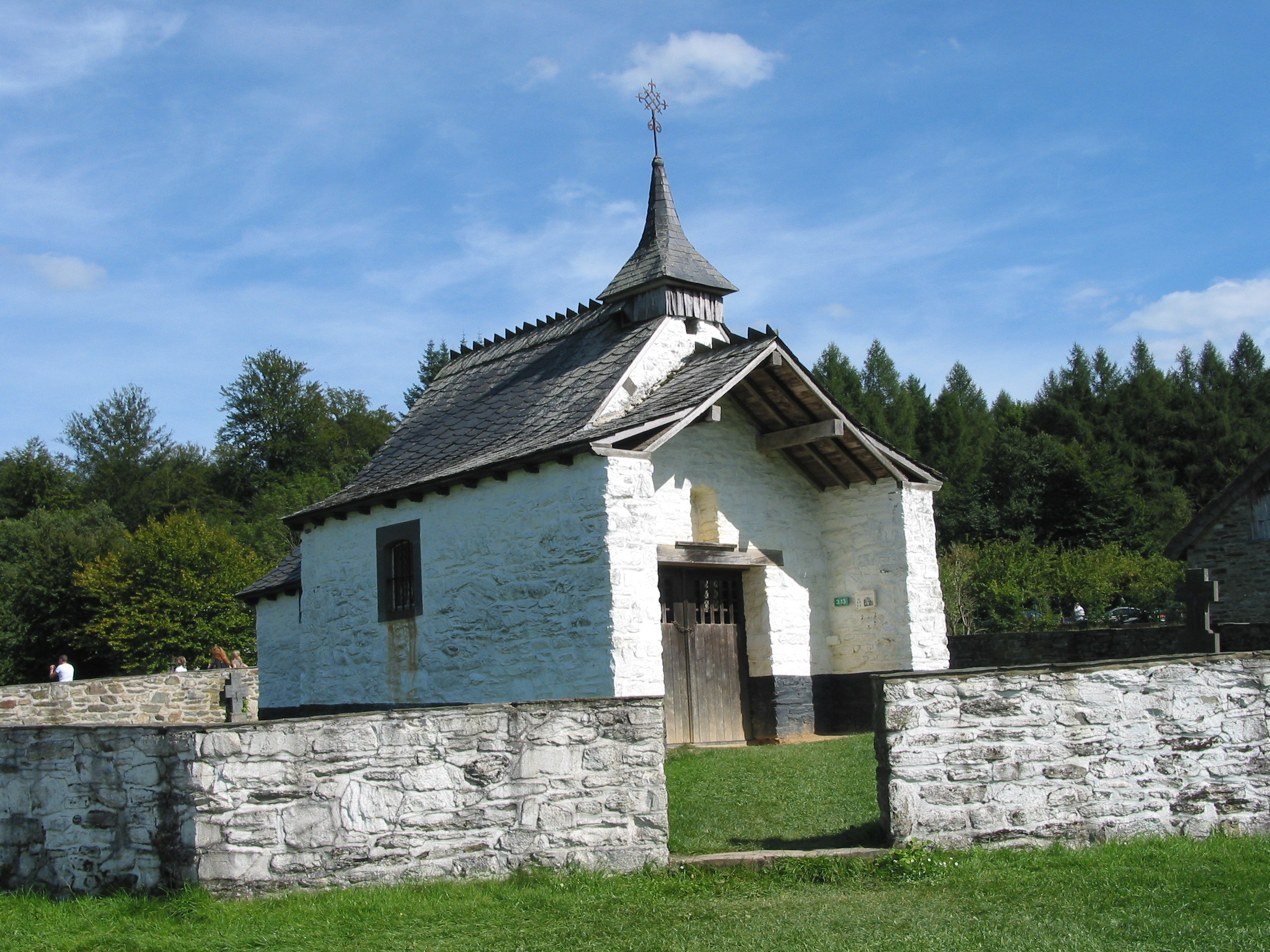
The 18th-century Grand-Halleux chapel was rebuilt in the museum in 1982

The Museum of Rural Life in Wallonia (French: Musée de la vie rurale en Wallonie) is an open-air museum near Saint-Hubert in Luxembourg Province in Belgium. The museum and nearby Iron Museum (Musée du Fer) are the two constituent museums of the Fourneau Saint-Michel Provincial Estate (Domaine provincial du Fourneau Saint-Michel). It is broadly similar to the Flemish open-air museum at Bokrijk.

The Museum of Rural Life in Wallonia features 50 buildings and structures from across southern and eastern Wallonia. The museum's collections, accumulated mainly since 1970, also extend to over 40,000 items.
