= Nazareth Village =

- כפר נצרת
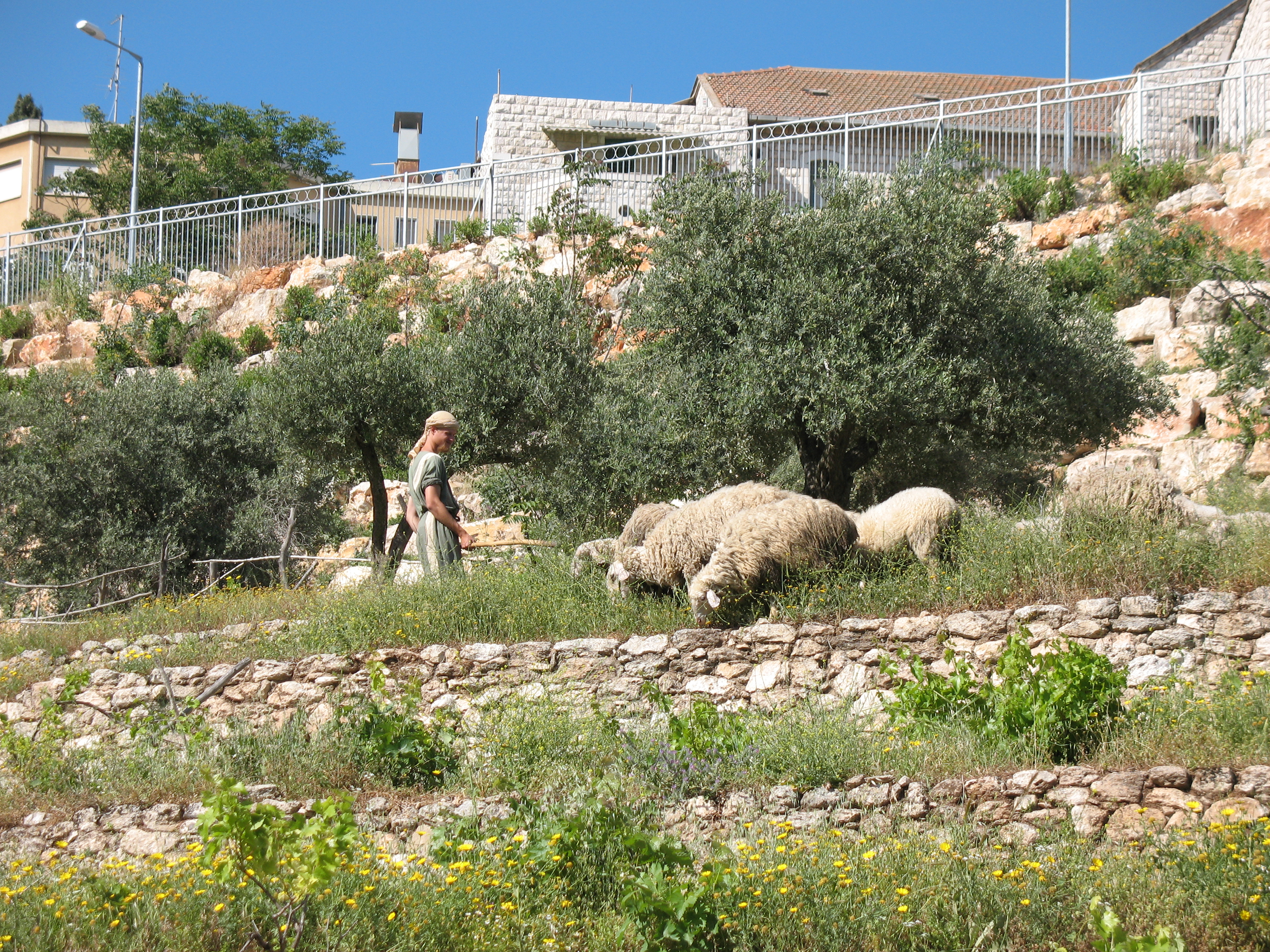
- Nazareth Village

- Location within Israel
- Established: 2000
- Location: Nazareth, Israel
- Coordinates: 32°42′0.29″N 35°17′29.82″E
- Type: Open-air museum
- Founder: Nakhle Bishara
- Website: www.nazarethvillage.com

Nazareth Village (Hebrew: כפר נצרת) is a tourist attraction and open-air museum in Nazareth, Israel that recreates and reenacts village life in the Galilee in first century A.D., the time of Jesus.

== History ==
The Nazareth Village is built on agricultural land on the outskirts of Nazareth, where the area’s last remaining first-century wine press was found. The original farm has been restored with the ancient wine press, terraces, irrigation system and stone quarry. In addition, replicas of first-century houses, a synagogue, a watchtower, mikveh and olive presses have been recreated, using the building methods and materials prevalent in first century A.D. Galilee, according to archaeologists.

== See also ==
- Tourism in Israel
- Jesus Trail
