= Musée de Plein Air =

- Musée de Plein Air
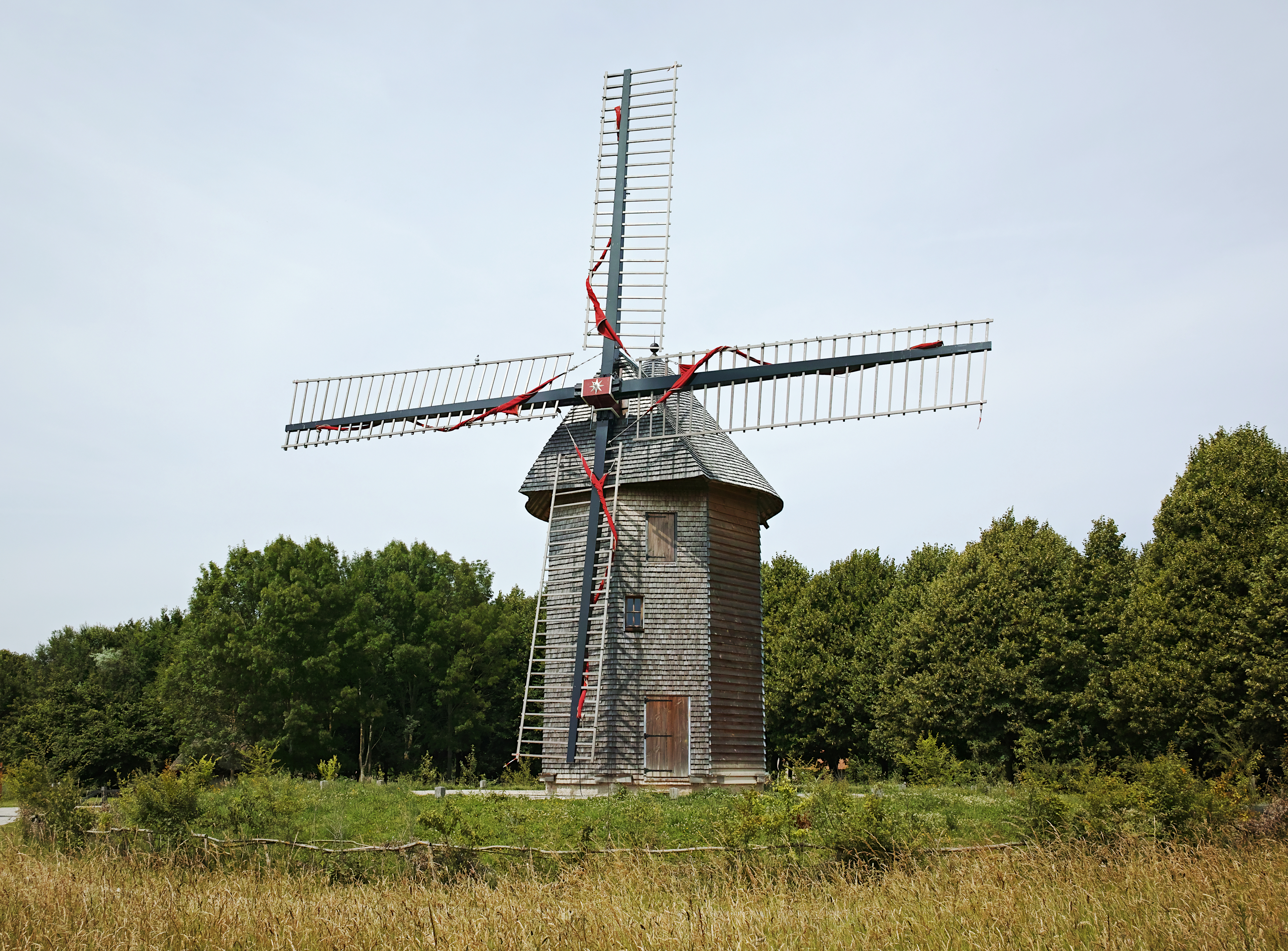
- Established: 2007
- Location: Villeneuve d'Ascq, Hauts-de-France, France
- Coordinates: 50.6242°N 3.1819°E
- Type: Open-air museum
- Website: enm.lillemetropole.fr/parcs/musee-de-plein-air

The Musée de Plein Air (French; lit. 'Open-Air Museum') is an open-air museum in Villeneuve d'Ascq, Hauts-de-France in France. It displays around 20 houses, barns, and other historic buildings from around French Flanders, Artois, and Picardy. It also showcases traditional crafts and rare breeds. The museum opened in 2007 and it is currently managed by the Métropole Européenne de Lille (MEL).

== Description ==
Since the 1990's, the Association for the Safeguarding of Rural Heritage has saved twenty old buildings (XVI, 17th, 18th, and 19th centuries) from the Nord-Pas-de-Calais region, transferring them to the museum where they are to be discovered.

Boilers and barns in ruins or that were to be demolished (passage of highway, railway, etc.) are raised in their reconstructed environment with fidelity. Craftsmen (stone tailors, blacksmiths, country gardeners, carpenter, wood carver, garmenter, puppet creator) animate the museum, populated by regional animals (often endangered species

In a park of fourteen hectares, the museum presents about twenty buildings of various uses from the countries of Artois, Flanders, Picardy and Hainaut. Boilers, barns, sheepfolds, forgings, chartils, half-timbered, bricks and torchis, covered with breakdowns or straw, relate the aspects of rural life and regional memory. On the site, gardens, hedges, ponds, paths trace the beginnings of a village of crafts, arts and popular cultures.

The museum is a space for the enhancement of rural vernacular heritage in the north of Paris. Mirror of past rural life, it presents the soul and the specificities. This site values many disciplines: humanities, history, ethnology, folk arts and traditions, crafts.

Intended to raise public awareness of the regional heritage and its safeguarding, the museum is also a place of meeting, research and training for construction actors.

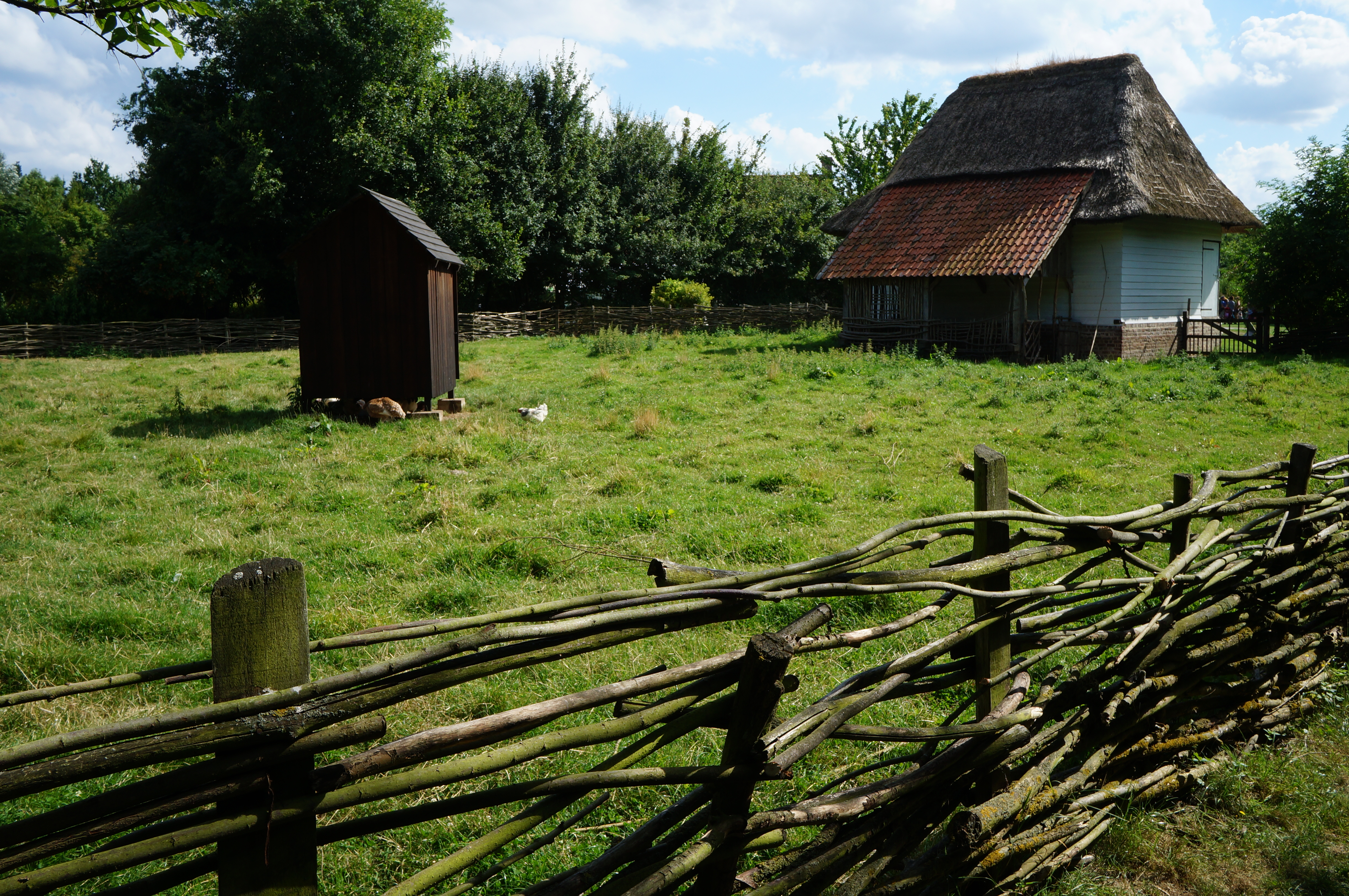
Germoir de Warhem.

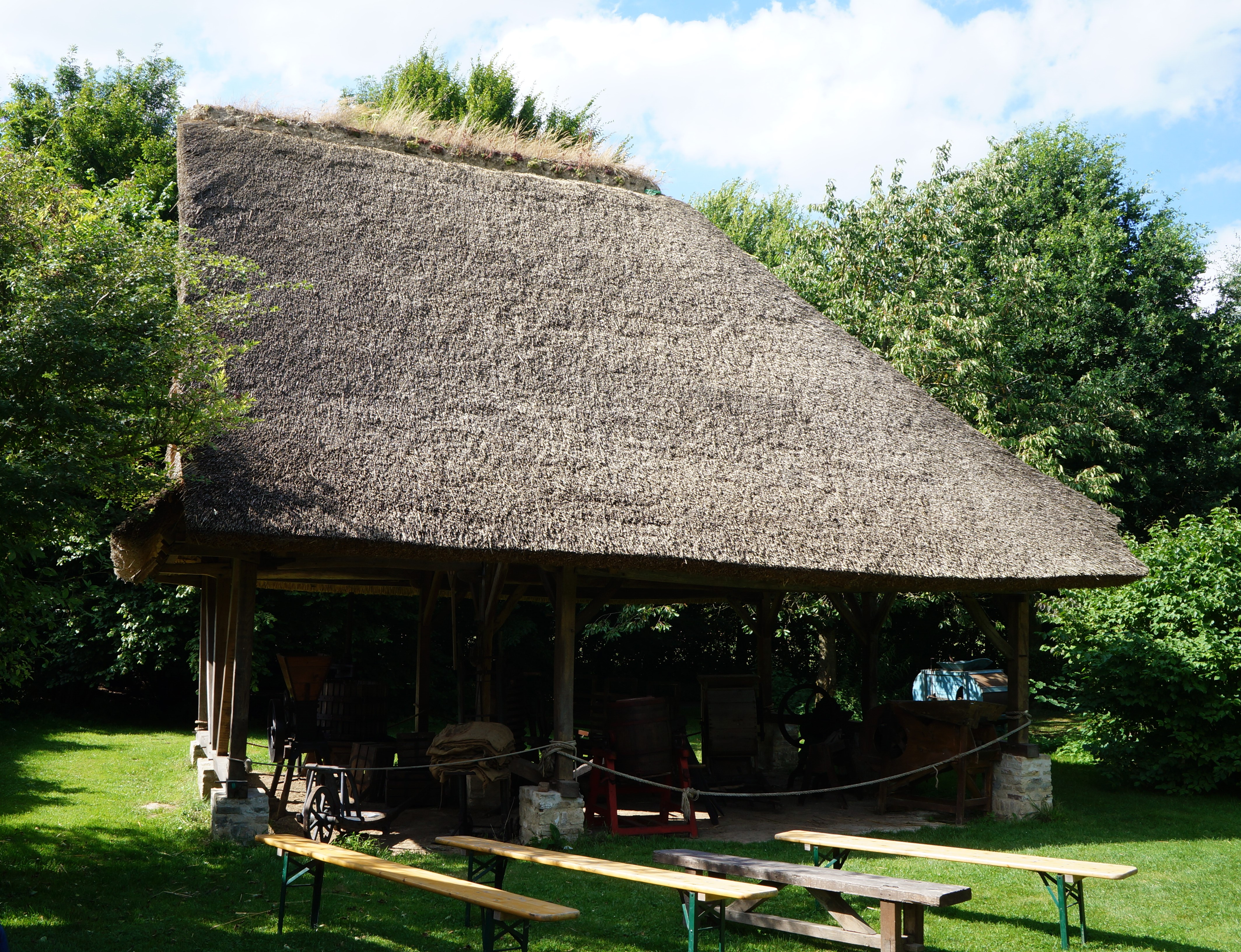
Chartil d'Eringhem.

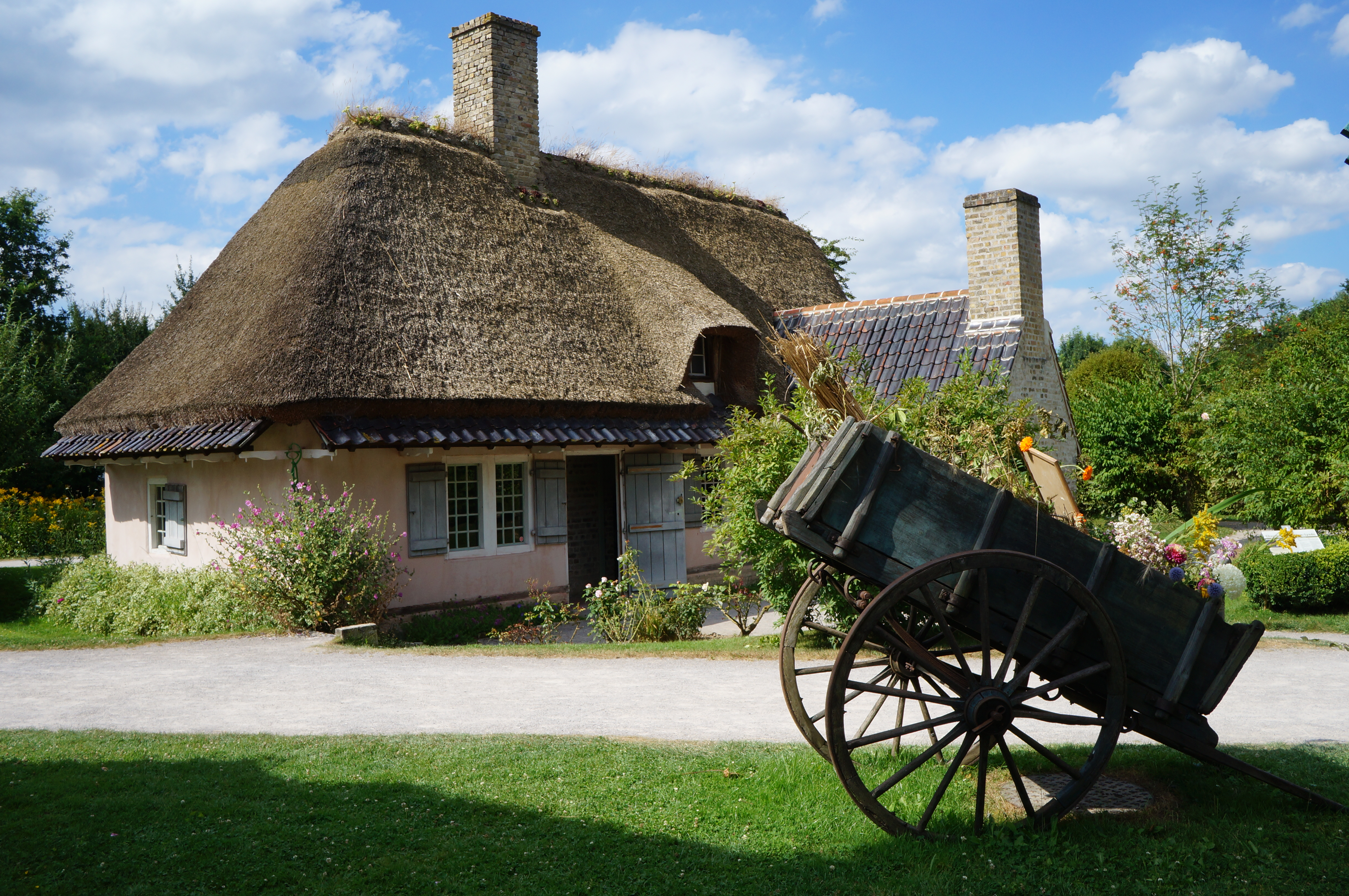
Chaumière de Killem.

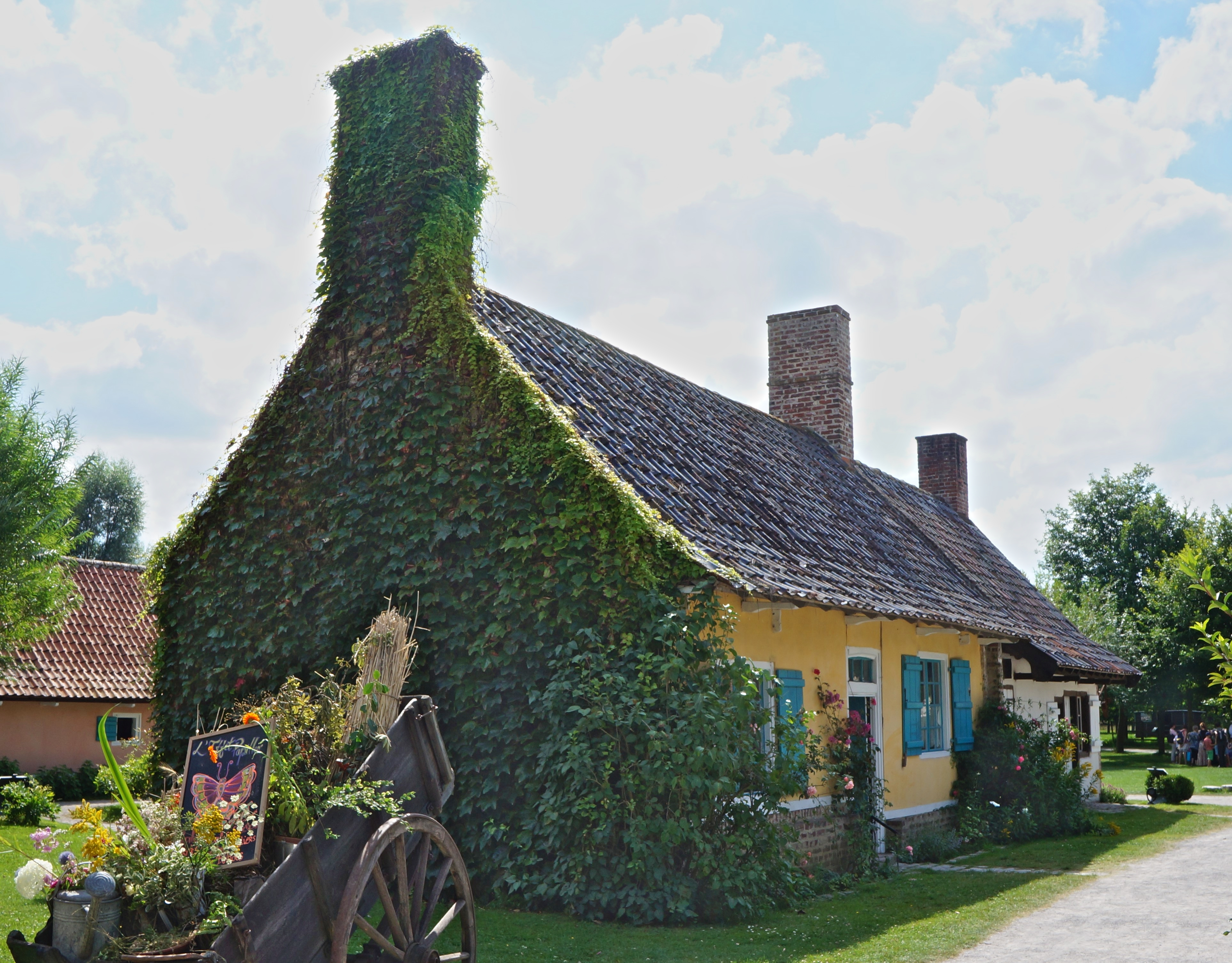
Forges d'Hondschoote.

== Associative forge Zeal Iron ==
Forge Zèle Fer.- The original rose exists only by name we have only vain names (Umberto Eco)

One of the forges bears the inscription « Stat rosa pristina nomine, nomina nuda tenemus, which translates: "The original rose exists only by name; we have only vain names." It is a variation of verse I, 952 of the poem De despisu mundi (Bernard de Cluny), made famous by the novel The Name of the Rose by Umberto Eco.

The workshop of the blacksmith is a place of passage, exchange and know-how transmitted from generation to generation. This reference summarizes the philosophy of the museum by mentioning the disappearance of things and the fragility of memory. In the forge the matter is transformed by fire and the work of the craftsman. As long as the fire burns in the forge and the hammer hits the iron, the job remains alive, which invites the visitor to reflect on how the old trades can continue to live today.

Forge of the Aumale'stable

Blacksmith at work
