= North Østerdalen Museums =

- Musea i Nord-Østerdalen
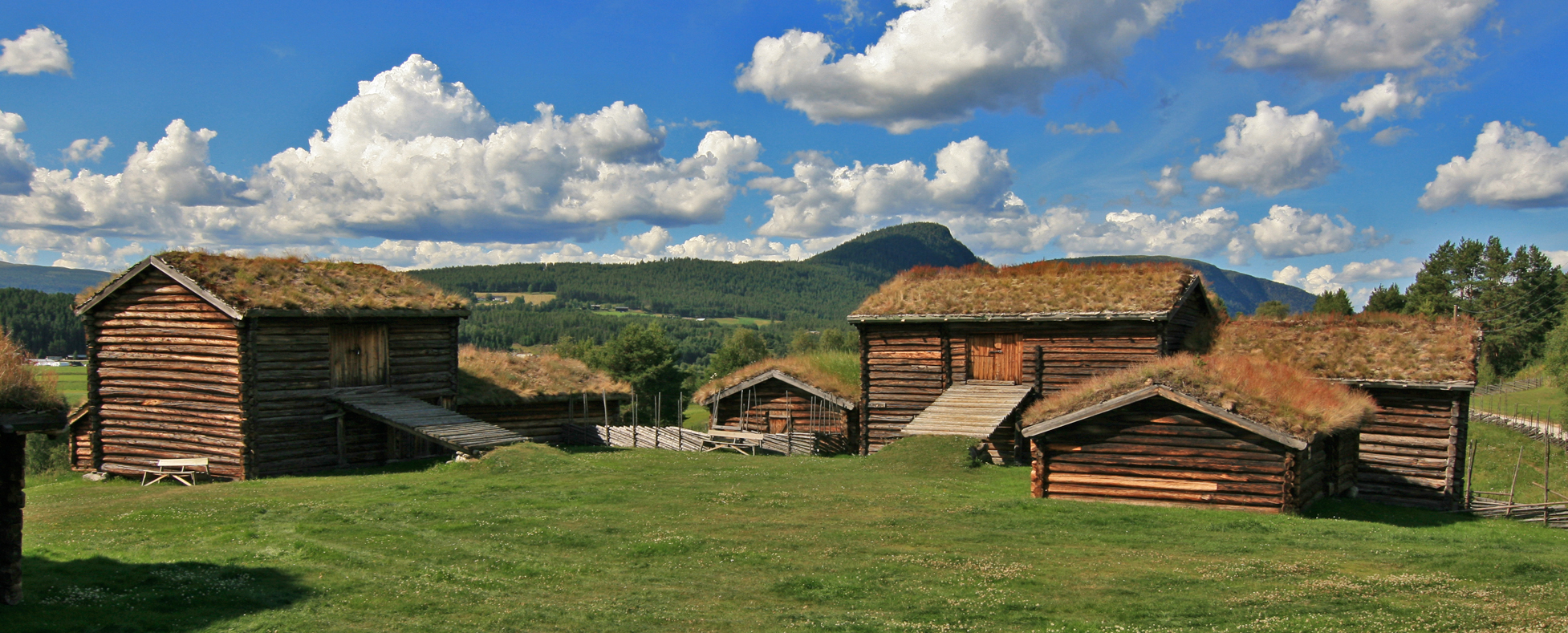
- Alvdal farm settlement

- Location within Innlandet Location within Norway
- Former name: North Østerdalen Museum (Nordøsterdalsmuseet)
- Established: 1976
- Location: Tynset, Norway
- Coordinates: 62°16′23″N 10°46′24″E
- Type: Open-air museum
- Website: museainordosterdalen.no

North Østerdalen Museums (Norwegian: Musea i Nord-Østerdalen) is a museum in the northern part of Norway's Østerdalen district.

The museum was established in 1976. It changed its name to Nordøsterdalsmuseet 'North Østerdalen Museum' in 2004, but the name Musea i Nord-Østerdalen was restored in 2015. It is an open-air museum with units throughout Østerdalen. North Østerdalen Museums is a department of the Anno Museum.

The head office is the Ramsmoen Museum Center in Tynset. The museum has 11 operating buildings and 151 museum buildings, of which 60 have been moved and the rest stand in their original place. Among those in their original locations are is the Alvdal farm settlement; with its 18 houses, it is one of the Norway's best-preserved old farm settlements. The museum's most frequently visited unit is the Aukrust Center. Among the other units are Bjørnstjerne Bjørnson's birthplace at Bjørgan parsonage in Kvikne, the Rendalen Village Museum (a.k.a. the Bull Museum, Jacob Breda Bull's childhood home), the Os Museum, the Tylldalen Farm Village, the Tynset Village Museum, the Folldal Farm Village, and the Dølmo Farm Museum in Tolga.
