= Khokhlovka =

Open-air museum in Perm Krai, Russia

Coordinates: 58°15′40″N 56°15′40″E

Architectural and ethnographic museum Khokhlovka (Russian: Архитектурно-этнографический музей «Хохловка») is an open-air museum in Perm Krai, Russia. It is located in the Perm municipal district, on the right bank of the Kama River, 43 km from Perm. It was founded in 1969 and opened for visitors in 1980. It is the first open-air architectural museum of wooden architecture in the Ural.

Khokhovka includes 23 unique monuments from the 17th – early 20th centuries. The territory is about 35 ha with many wooden constructions and buildings that were moved here from different places of the Perm Krai.

It is one of the most important tourist attractions in the Perm Krai.

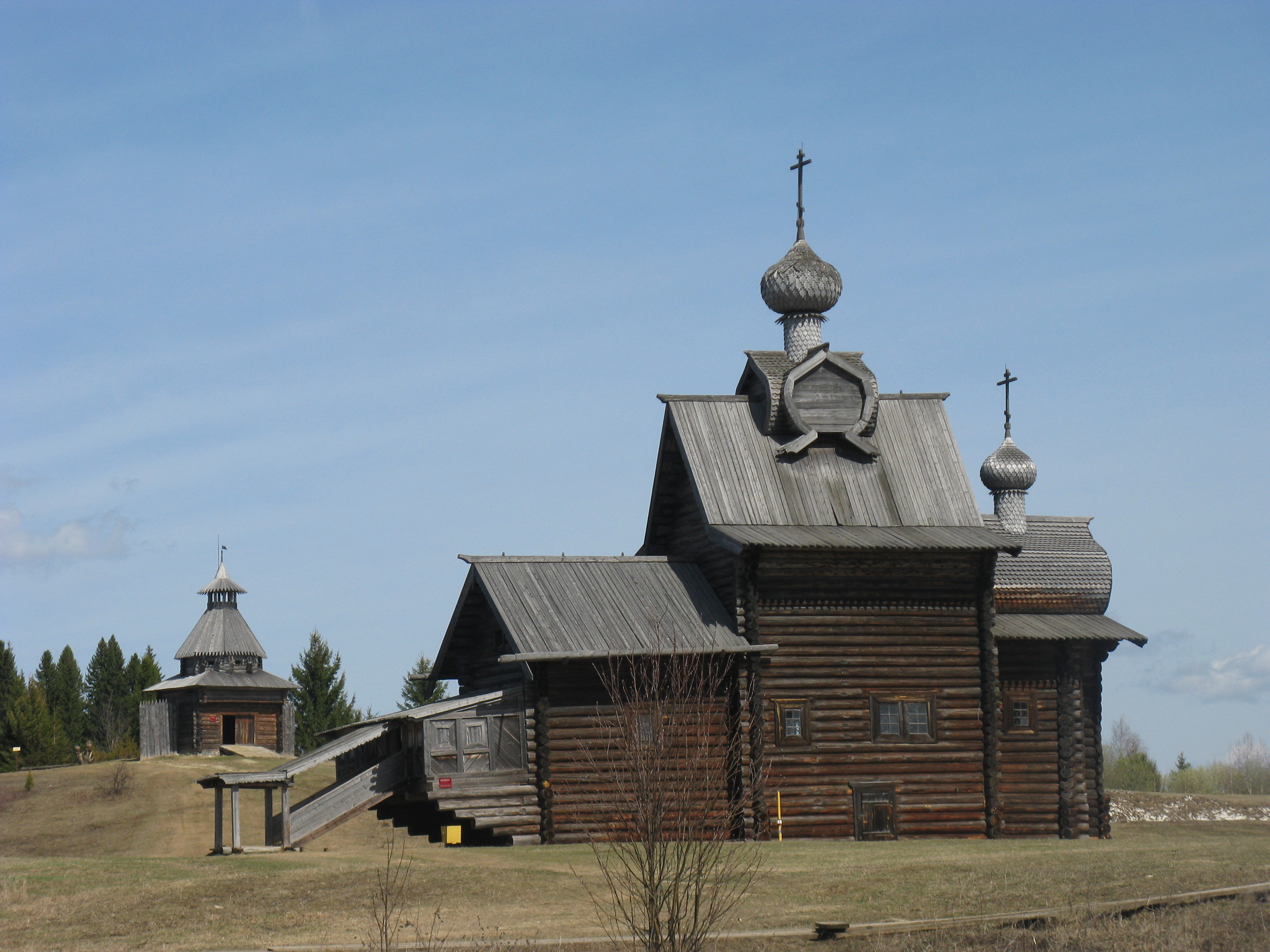
Church of Transfiguration and a watchtower

== Collection ==
- Church of the Transfiguration (Церковь Преображения) 1702, from the Cherdynsky District
- Church of Our Lady (Церковь Богородицы) 1694, from the Suksunsky District
- Watchtower 1905 (copy of 17th century original), from the Suksunsky District
- Bell tower 1781, from the Suksunsky District
- Unique production cell of the Ust'-Borovskoy Salt Factory from Solikamsk, 1880s
- Izba of Kudymov (Изба Кудымова) 19th century, Yusvinsky District
- Threshing floor with barn (Гумно с овином) 1920, Kudymkarsky District
- Windmill, 19th century, from the Ochyorsky District

and others

== Festivals and holidays ==
The museum regularly hosts various ethnic and cultural festivals and holidays. In winter it's Maslenitsa (February or March). The most important summer events are The military reconstruction festival Great Maneuvers on the Khokhlovka's Hills and the ethnofuturistic international festival KAMWA, which are held every year in Khokhlovka.
