= Sądecki Ethnographic Park =

Open-air museum in Nowy Sącz, Poland

The Sądecki Ethnographic Park
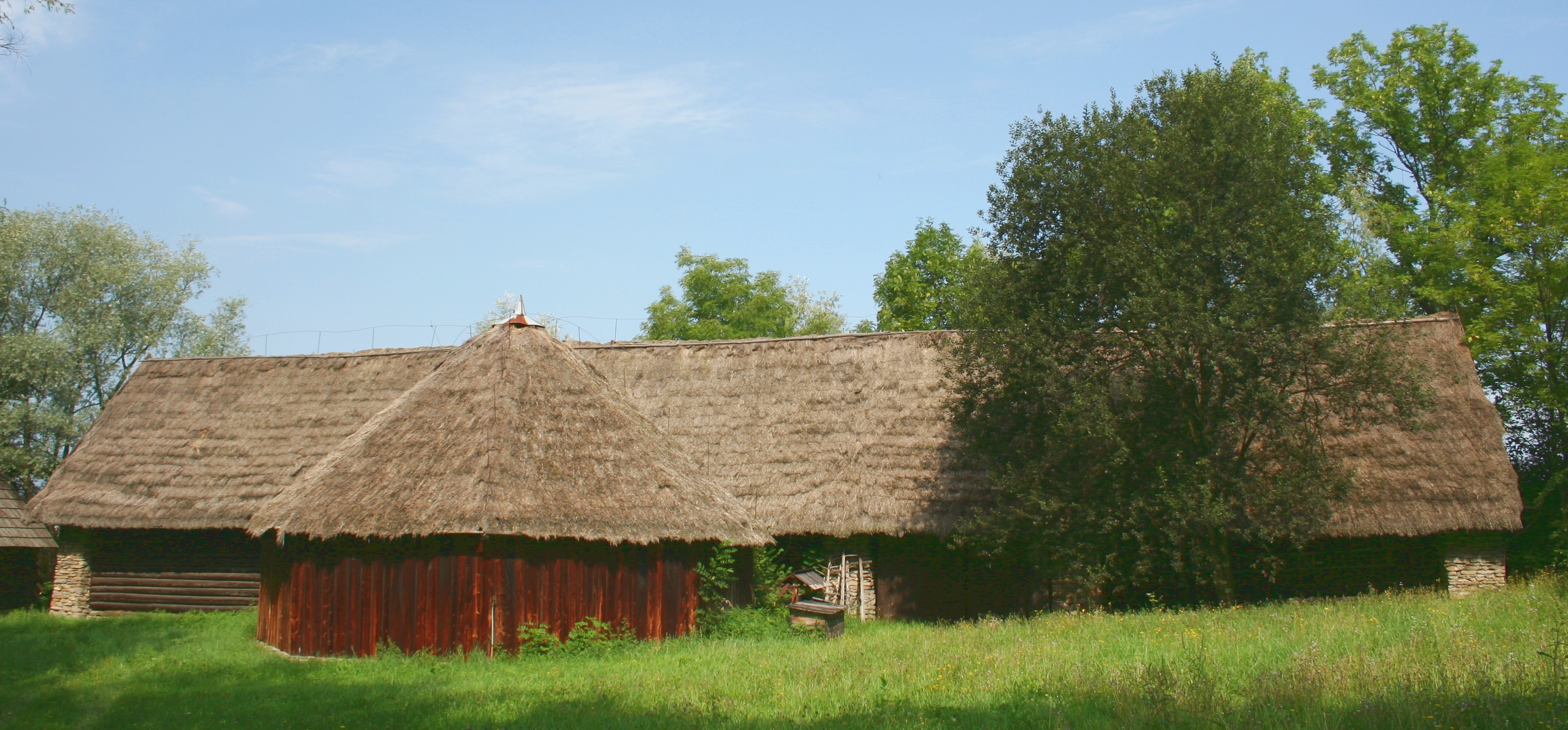
- Location: Poland
- Coordinates: 49°36′N 20°42′E
- Website: www.muzeum.sacz.pl/47,Skansen_regionalny__Sadecki_Park_Etnograficzny.htm
- Location of Sądecki Ethnographic Park

The Sądecki Ethnographic Park (pl. - Sądecki Park Etnograficzny) is an open-air museum in Nowy Sącz.
