= Fådalen =

Village in Tynset Municipality, Norway

- Village
- Interactive map of Fådalen
- Location within Innlandet Location within Norway
- Coordinates: 62.30135°N 10.60941°E
- Country: Norway
- Region: Eastern Norway
- County: Innlandet
- District: Østerdalen
- Municipality: Tynset Municipality
- Elevation: 653 m (2,142 ft)
- Time zone: UTC+01:00 (CET)
  - Summer (DST): UTC+02:00 (CEST)
- Post Code: 2500 Tynset

Fådalen (or historically spelled Faadalen) is a valley and village area in Tynset Municipality in Innlandet county, Norway. The valley is located about 10 kilometres (6.2 mi) west of the municipal centre of Tynset. The village of Fåset lies at the southern end of the valley where the river Fåa flows into the large river Glåma. The village of Savalen and the lake Savalen both lie at the northwest end of the valley.

== Name ==
The first element is the river name Fåa and the last element is the finite form of the Norwegian word dal which means 'dale' or 'valley'. Hence the meaning is the "Fåa river valley".
