= Ulset Hydroelectric Power Station =

Ulset Power Station
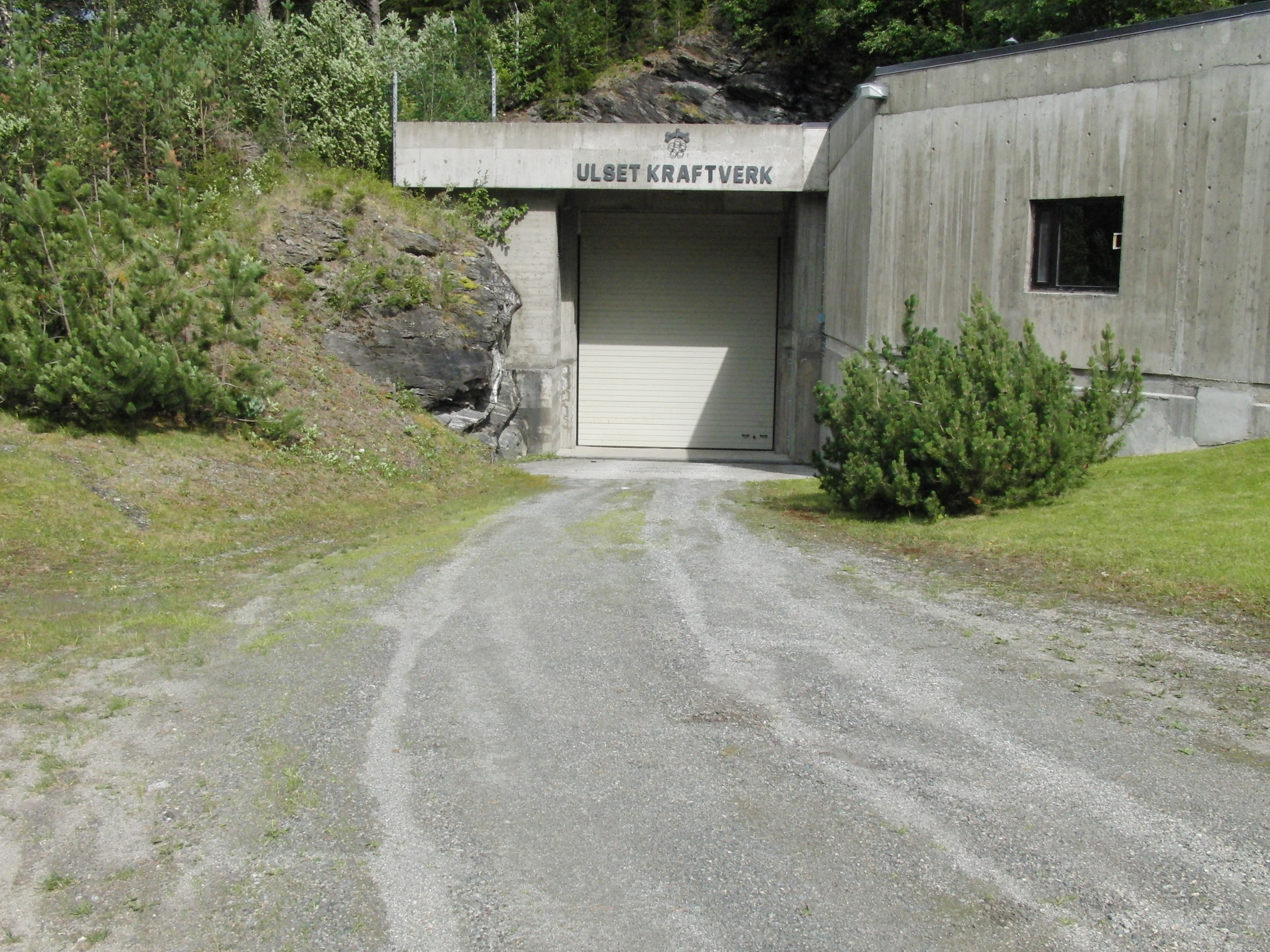
- Interactive map of Ulset Power Station
- Official name: Ulset kraftverk
- Country: Norway
- Location: Tynset, Innlandet
- Coordinates: 62°37′07″N 10°15′16″E
- Status: Operational
- Opening date: 1985; 41 years ago
- Owner: KVO

Upper reservoir
- Creates: Stor-sverjesjøen, Falningsjøen

Lower reservoir
- Creates: Orkla River

Power Station
- Hydraulic head: 325 m
- Turbines: 1 × 35 MW
- Installed capacity: 35 MW
- Annual generation: 140 GW·h

The Ulset Hydroelectric Power Station (Norwegian: Ulset kraftverk or Ulset kraftstasjon) is a hydroelectric power station in Tynset Municipality in Innlandet county, Norway.

The plant is located in the Orkla River system and utilizes a drop of 325 meters (1,066 ft) from Stor-Sverjesjøen (Big Lake Sverja, regulated at 872.5–867.7 meters or 2,863–2,847 feet) and Falningsjøen (Lake Falning, regulated at 872.5–825 meters or 2,863–2,707 feet). It also utilizes water from two streams, which reduces the volume of water supplied to the Ya River.

The plant has a 35 MW Francis turbine and an average annual production of about 140 GWh. It started production in 1985. The plant is owned by KVO, whereby Statkraft is the largest owner and it is operated by Trondheim Energi Kraft.
