= Savalen =

Lake in Innlandet, Norway

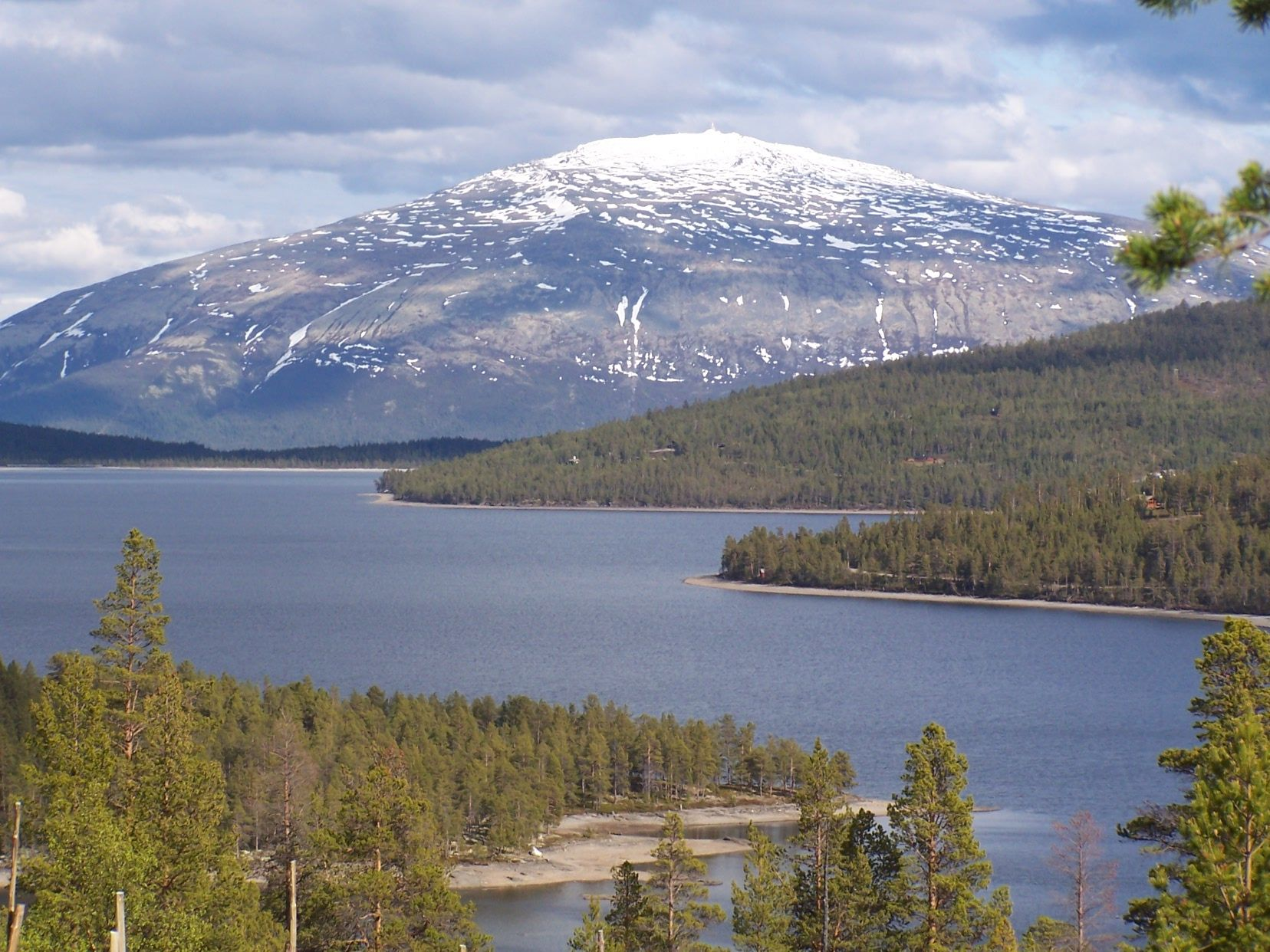
- The lake with Tronfjell in the background
- Interactive map of the lake
- Location: Innlandet
- Coordinates: 62.241111°N 10.482222°E
- Primary outflows: Sivilla
- Basin countries: Norway
- Max. length: 9.2 kilometres (5.7 mi)
- Max. width: 5.2 kilometres (3.2 mi)
- Surface area: 18 km^{2} (6.9 sq mi)
- Shore length^{1}: 48 kilometres (30 mi)
- Surface elevation: 707 metres (2,320 ft)
- References: NVE
- ^{1} Shore length is not a well-defined measure.

Savalen is a lake in Innlandet country, Norway. The 18-square-kilometre (6.9 sq mi) lake is located along the border of Tynset Municipality and Alvdal Municipality. The lake sits about 15 kilometres (9.3 mi) west of the town of Tynset and about 13 kilometres (8.1 mi) north of the village of Alvdal. The village of Savalen is located at the northeastern end of the lake.

The river Sivilla, which connects the lake Savalen and the large river Glomma, is regulated and exploited by the 62-megawatt (83,000 hp) Savalen hydropower station.

A tourist resort is located at the north eastern end of the lake in Savalen village, with facilities for winter sports. The skating stadium is the highest elevation skating venue in Norway. This venue saw two speed skating world records set by Eric Heiden, a world record in 1,000 m in 1978 and a world record in 3,000 m speedskating in 1979.

Arne Garborg's Kolbotn is located at the southern end of the lake.

== See also ==
- List of lakes in Norway
