= Tylldalen =

Village in Tynset Municipality, Norway

Tylldalen Tylldal
- Village
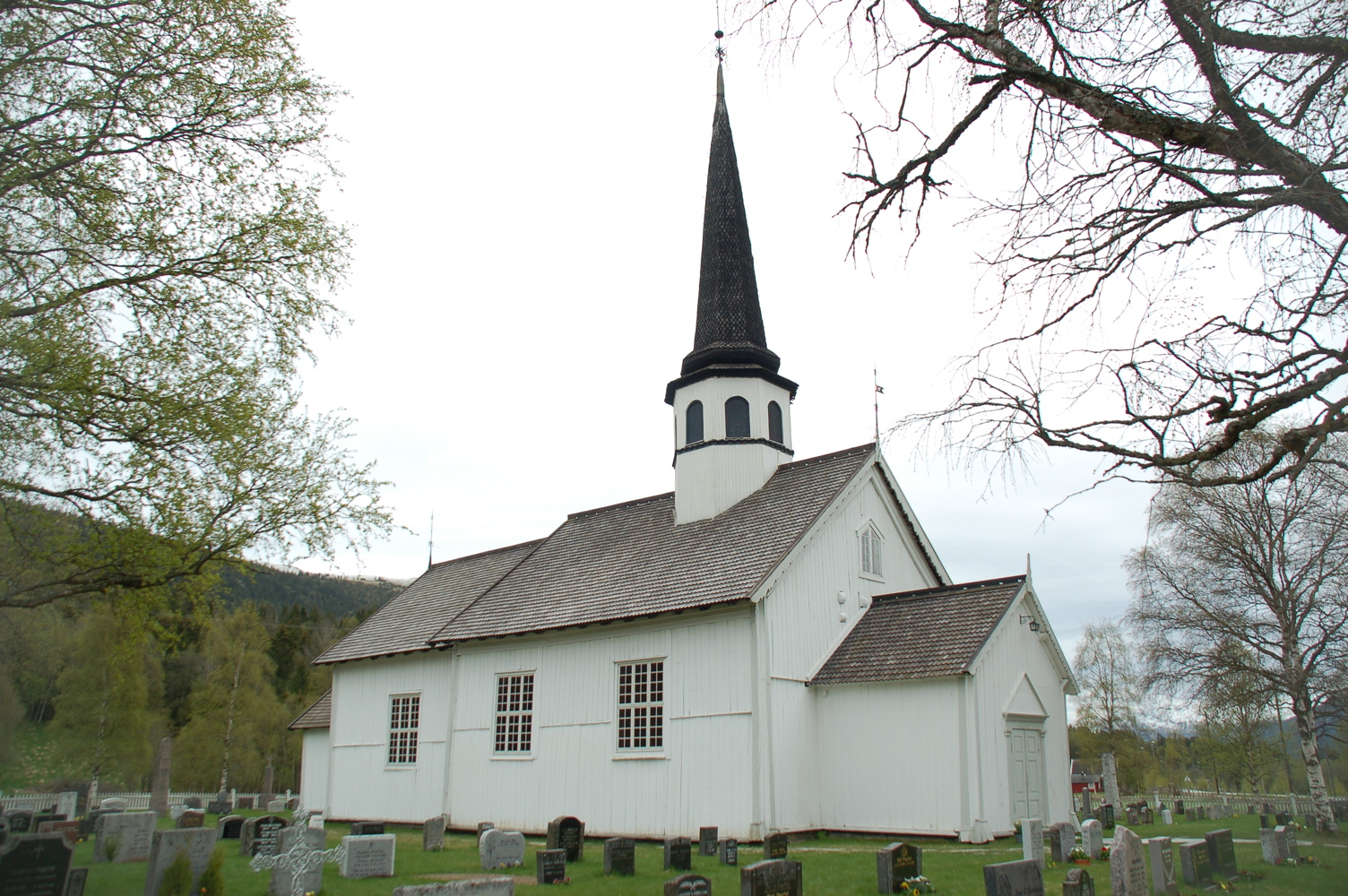
- View of the village church
- Interactive map of Tylldalen
- Location within Innlandet Location within Norway
- Coordinates: 62.13753°N 10.79448°E
- Country: Norway
- Region: Eastern Norway
- County: Innlandet
- District: Østerdalen
- Municipality: Tynset Municipality
- Elevation: 505 m (1,657 ft)
- Time zone: UTC+01:00 (CET)
  - Summer (DST): UTC+02:00 (CEST)
- Post Code: 2510 Tylldalen

Tylldalen is a village in Tynset Municipality in Innlandet county, Norway. The village is located in the southern part of the municipality, about 18 kilometres (11 mi) south of the town of Tynset. Tylldalen Church is located in the village as well as a small primary school. The river Tysla runs through the village. The 1,665-metre (5,463 ft) tall mountain Tron lies just northwest of the village.
