= Brydalen Church =

Church in Innlandet, Norway

- Brydalen kirke
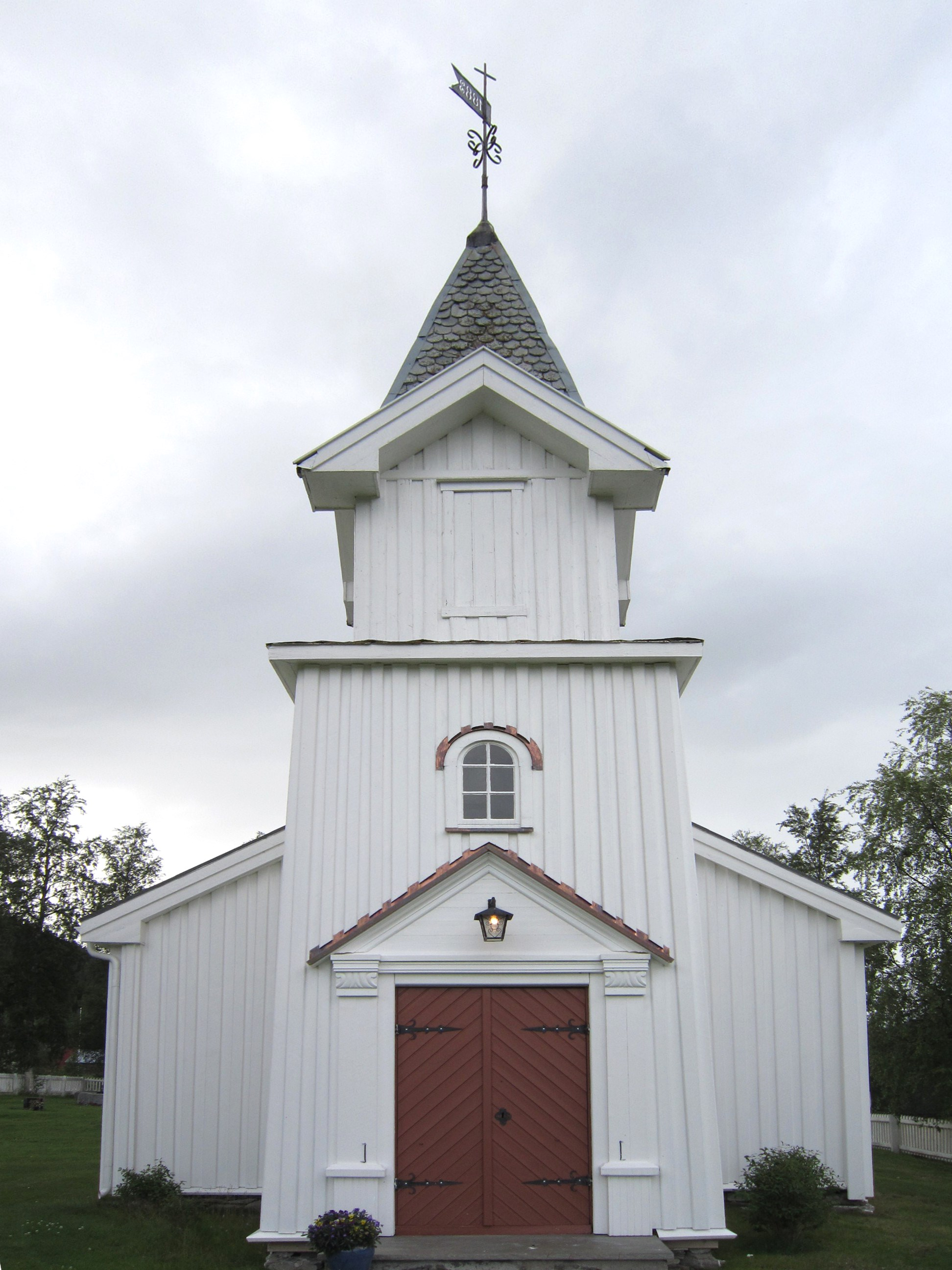
- View of the church
- Brydalen Church
- 62°11′16″N 10°59′18″E
- Location: Tynset Municipality, Innlandet
- Country: Norway
- Denomination: Church of Norway
- Churchmanship: Evangelical Lutheran

History
- Status: Parish church
- Founded: 1884
- Consecrated: 1884

Architecture
- Functional status: Active
- Architect: Ole Buhagen
- Architectural type: Long church
- Completed: 1884 (142 years ago)

Specifications
- Capacity: 100
- Materials: Wood

Administration
- Diocese: Hamar bispedømme
- Deanery: Nord-Østerdal prosti
- Parish: Brydalen
- Norwegian Cultural Heritage Site
- Type: Church
- Status: Not protected
- ID: 83963

Brydalen Church (Norwegian: Brydalen kirke) is a parish church of the Church of Norway in Tynset Municipality in Innlandet county, Norway. It is located in the village of Brydalen. It is the church for the Brydalen parish which is part of the Nord-Østerdal prosti (deanery) in the Diocese of Hamar. The white, wooden church was built in a long church design in 1884 using plans drawn up by the architect Ole Buhagen. The church seats about 100 people.

== History ==
The Brydalen valley was not settled until the 1700s. In 1871, a cemetery was established in the village. In 1883, a small chapel was built by the cemetery. Ole Buhaugen was the architect and possibly the builder as well. The new chapel built with donations and volunteer labour. It was completed and consecrated in 1884. It was also used as a school for many years. Originally, the building was an annex chapel, but in 1926 it was upgraded and enlarged to become a parish church.

== See also ==
- List of churches in Hamar
