= Kai Olav Ryen =

Norwegian footballer (born 1978)

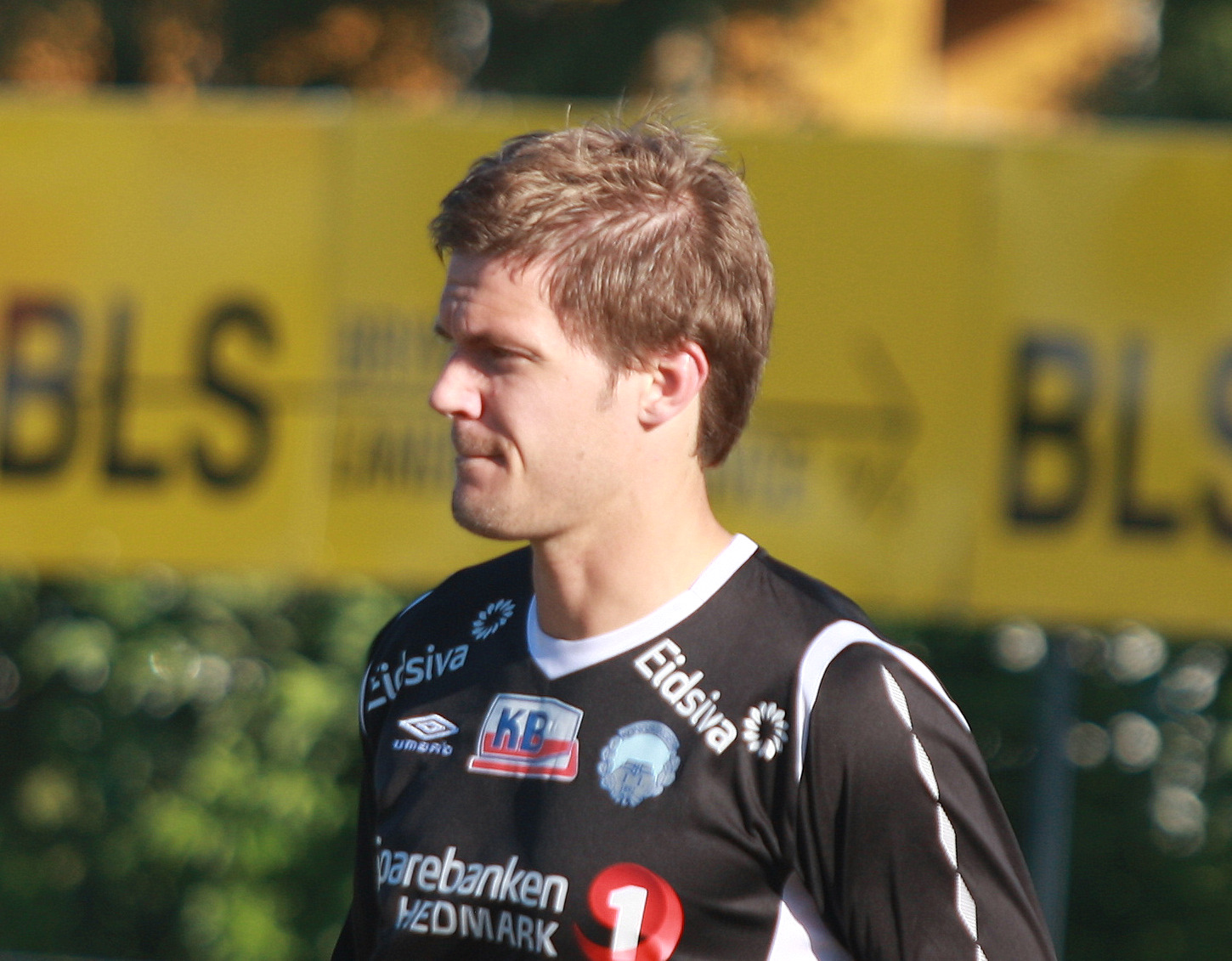

Personal information
- Date of birth: 10 September 1978 (age 48)
- Place of birth: Tynset, Norway
- Position: Defender

Senior career*
Years	Team	Apps	(Gls)
- Magnor
- Eidskog
2002–2013	Kongsvinger	271	(21)
- * Club domestic league appearances and goals

Kai Olav Ryen (born 10 September 1978) is a Norwegian former footballer who played as a defender.

He hails from Eidskog Municipality and played for Magnor UL and Eidskog Fotball, then joined Kongsvinger IL ahead of the 2002 season. The club played in the Second Division. In 2010, he made his debut in the Norwegian Premier League. He retired after the 2013 season.
