= Tynset Church =

Church in Innlandet, Norway

- Tynset kirke
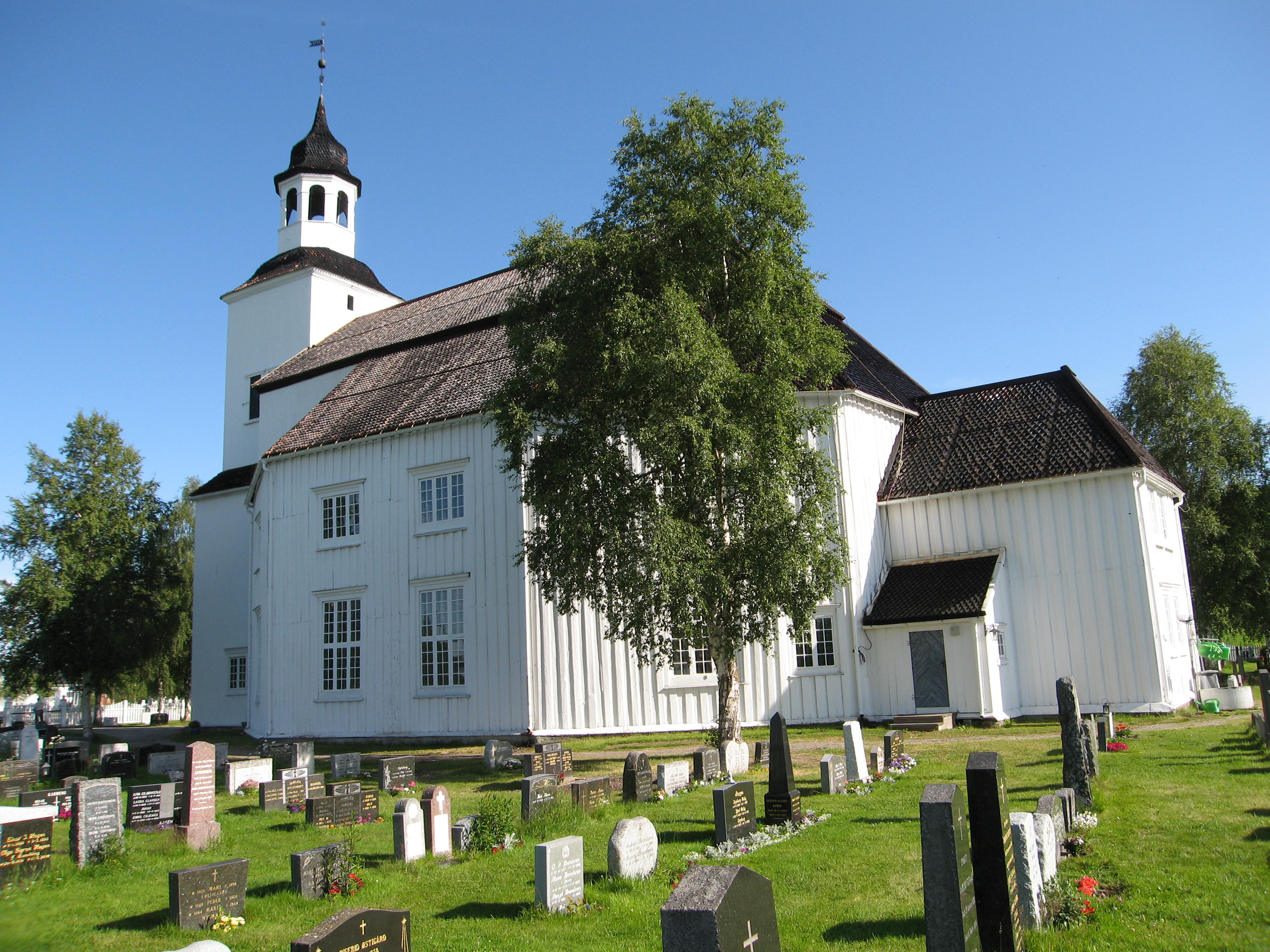
- View of the church
- Tynset Church
- 62°17′06″N 10°45′15″E
- Location: Tynset Municipality, Innlandet
- Country: Norway
- Denomination: Church of Norway
- Previous denomination: Catholic Church
- Churchmanship: Evangelical Lutheran

History
- Status: Parish church
- Founded: 1211
- Consecrated: 1795

Architecture
- Functional status: Active
- Architect: Peder Ellingsen
- Architectural type: Octagonal
- Completed: 1795 (231 years ago)

Specifications
- Capacity: 391
- Materials: Wood

Administration
- Diocese: Hamar bispedømme
- Deanery: Nord-Østerdal prosti
- Parish: Tynset
- Norwegian Cultural Heritage Site
- Type: Church
- Status: Automatically protected
- ID: 85694

Tynset Church (Norwegian: Tynset kirke) is a parish church of the Church of Norway in Tynset Municipality in Innlandet county, Norway. It is located in the town of Tynset. It is the church for the Tynset parish which is part of the Nord-Østerdal prosti (deanery) in the Diocese of Hamar. The white, wooden church was built in an octagonal design in 1795 using plans drawn up by the architect Peder Ellingsen. The church seats about 391 people.

== History ==
The first church in Tynset was a wooden stave church that was completed in 1211. The new church was consecrated in September 1211 by the Archbishop Tore. This church was located about 400 metres (1,300 ft) northeast of the present church site. In 1654, the old church was torn down and work on a new church on the same site began soon after. The new church was a timber-framed long church that was completed in 1657. By 1690, the old cemetery was full and a new cemetery was opened about 400 metres (1,300 ft) to the southwest of the existing church. The church quickly became too small for the parish.

From 1707-1708, a new church was built beside the new cemetery southwest of the old church. When the new church was finished, the old church was torn down. The new church did not last very long. In 1792, the church caught fire because of the careless handling of an open fire during a wedding in the church. The church was a total loss. Afterwards, there was talk of building a stone church, but this was too expensive. Peder Ellingson was hired to design the new wooden, octagonal building. The new church was consecrated in 1795.

In 1814, this church served as an election church (Norwegian: valgkirke). Together with more than 300 other parish churches across Norway, it was a polling station for elections to the 1814 Norwegian Constituent Assembly which wrote the Constitution of Norway. This was Norway's first national elections. Each church parish was a constituency that elected people called "electors" who later met together in each county to elect the representatives for the assembly that was to meet at Eidsvoll Manor later that year.

== Media gallery ==
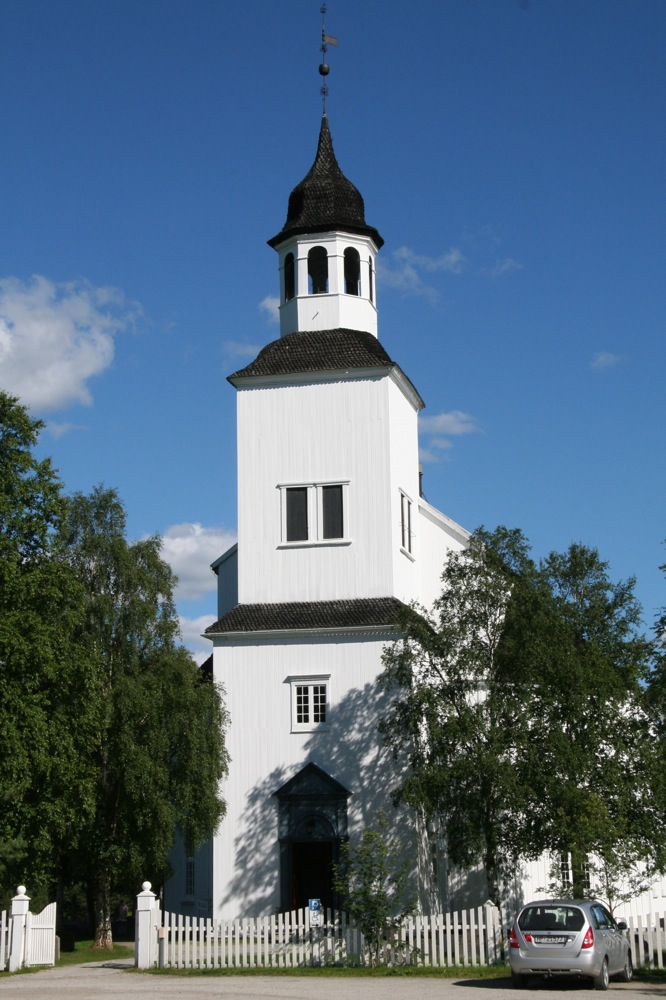

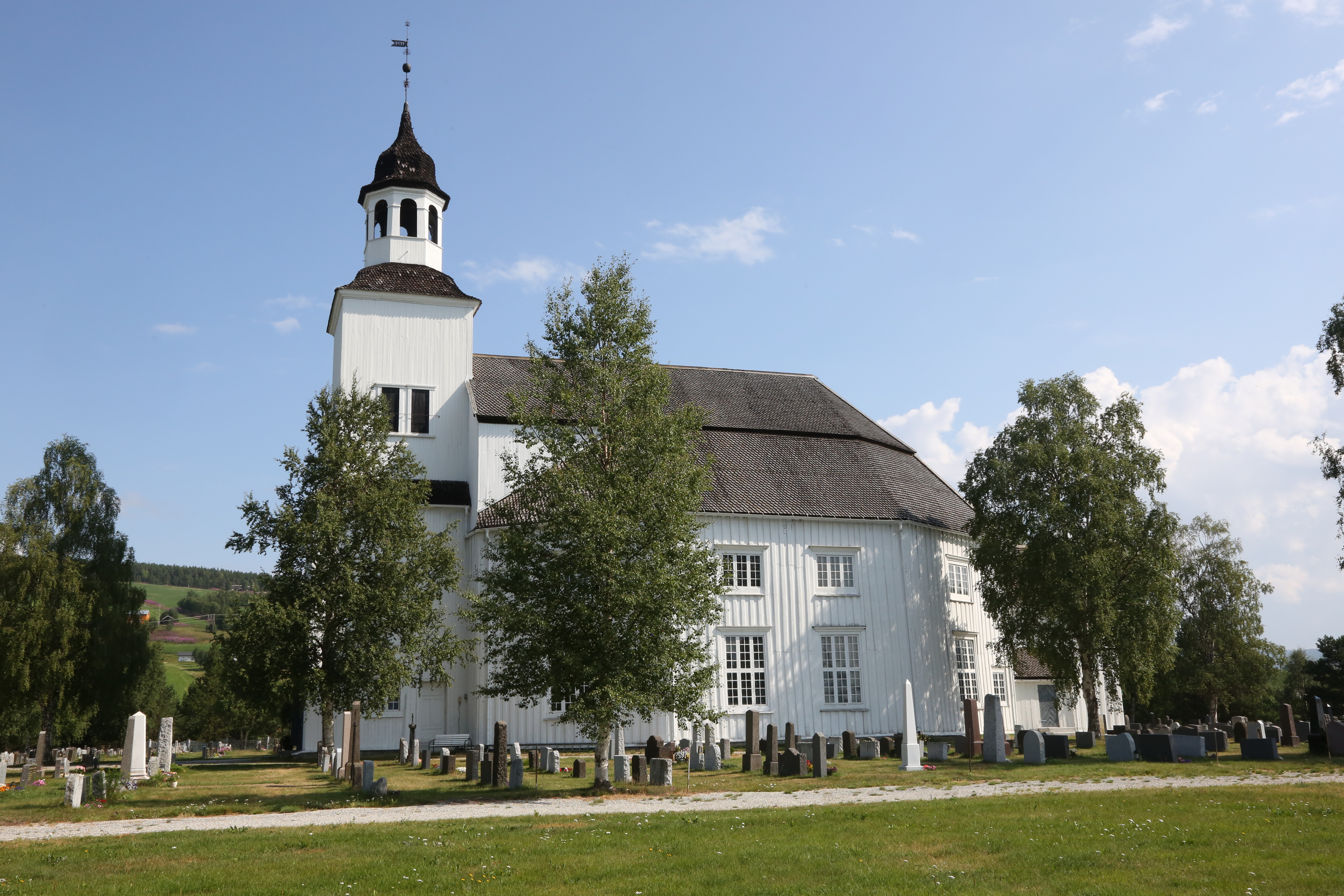

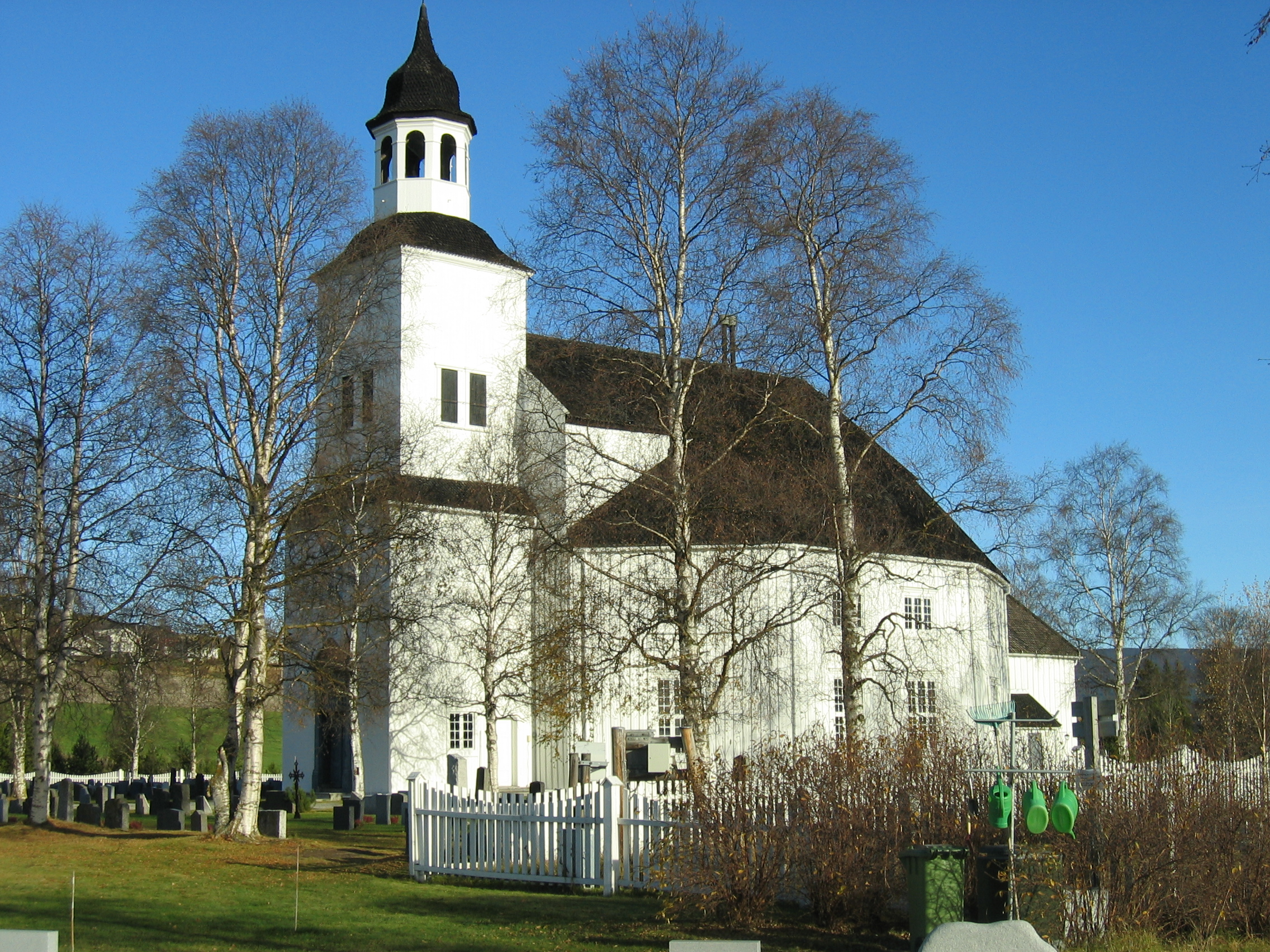

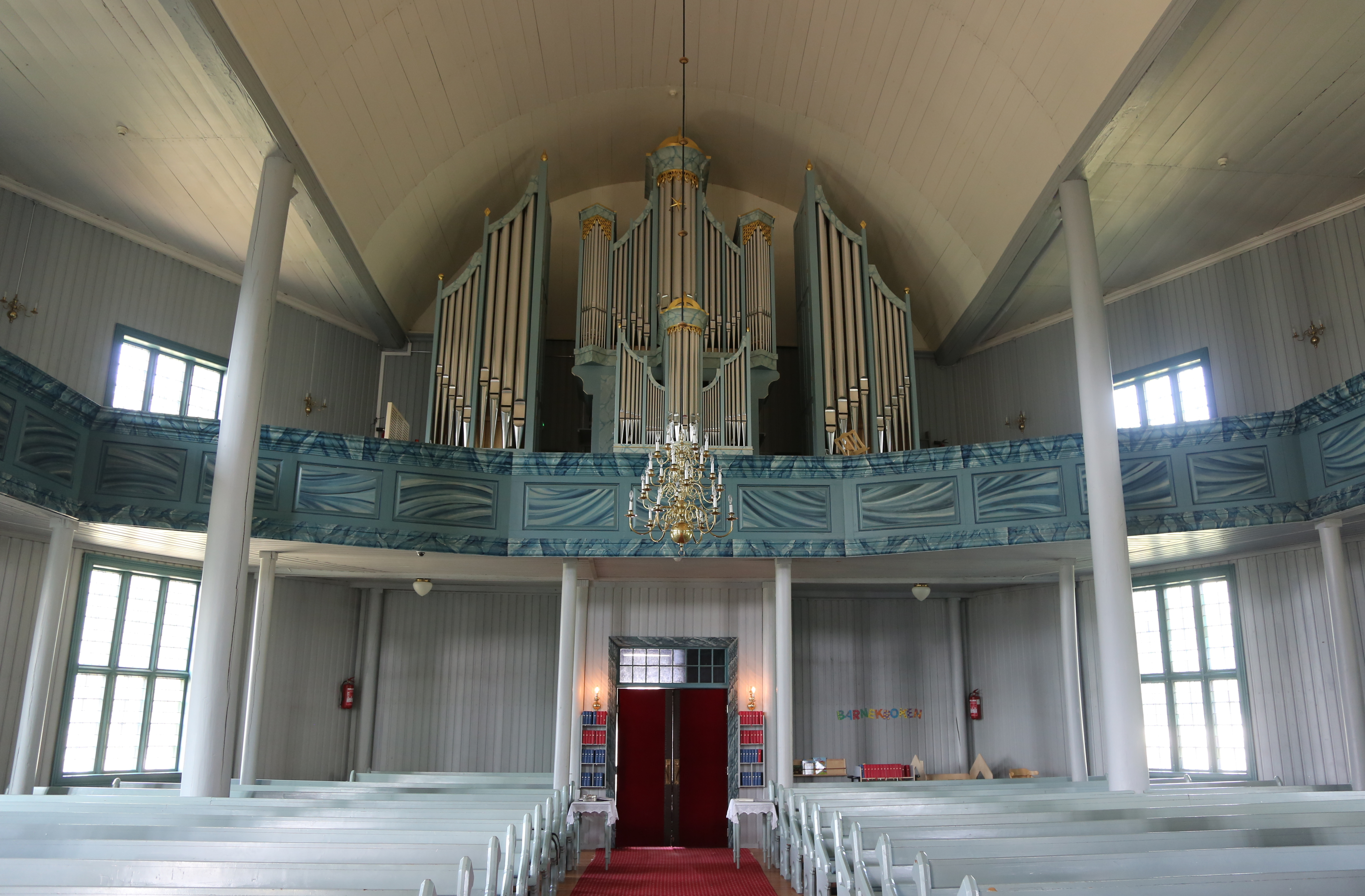

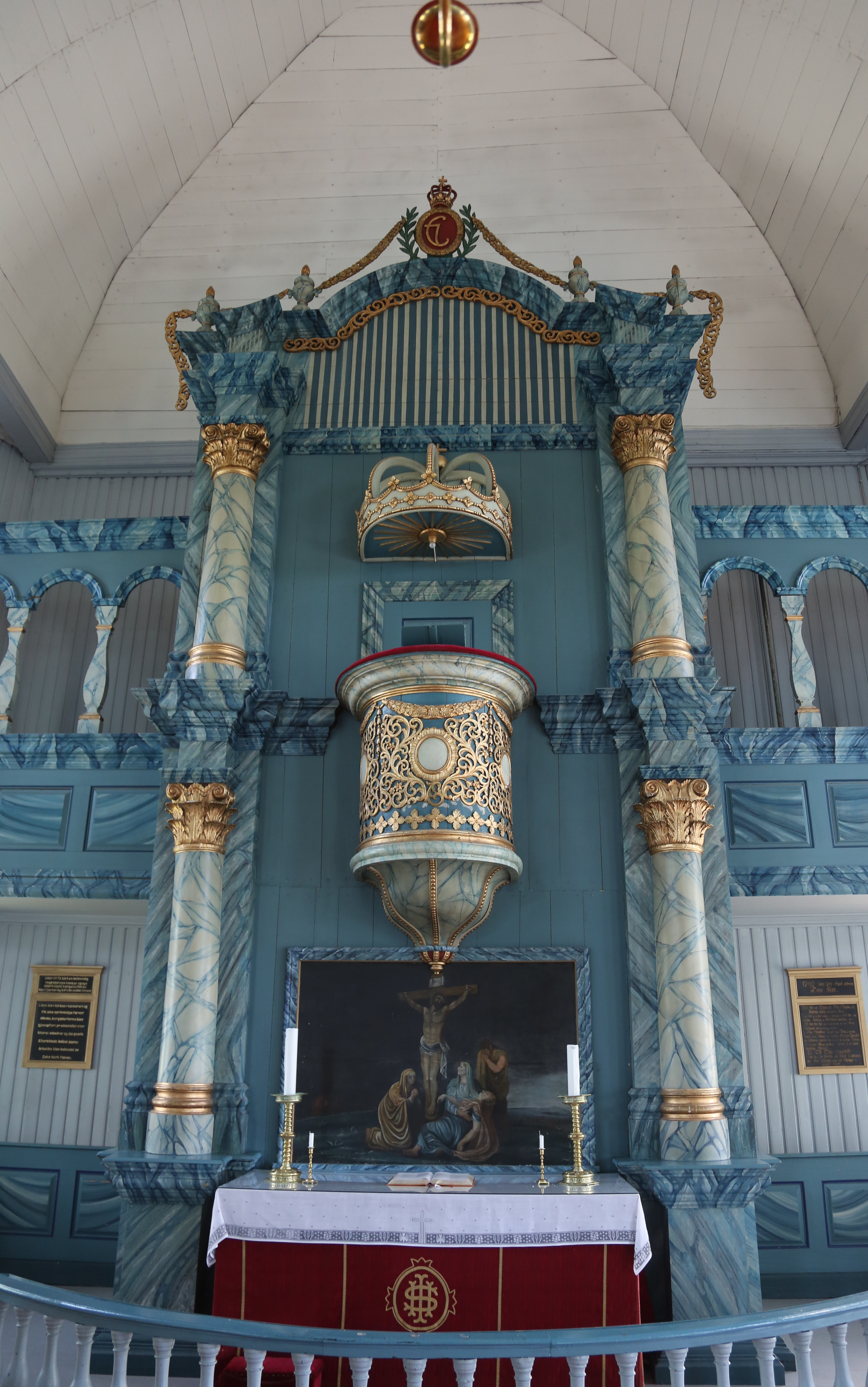

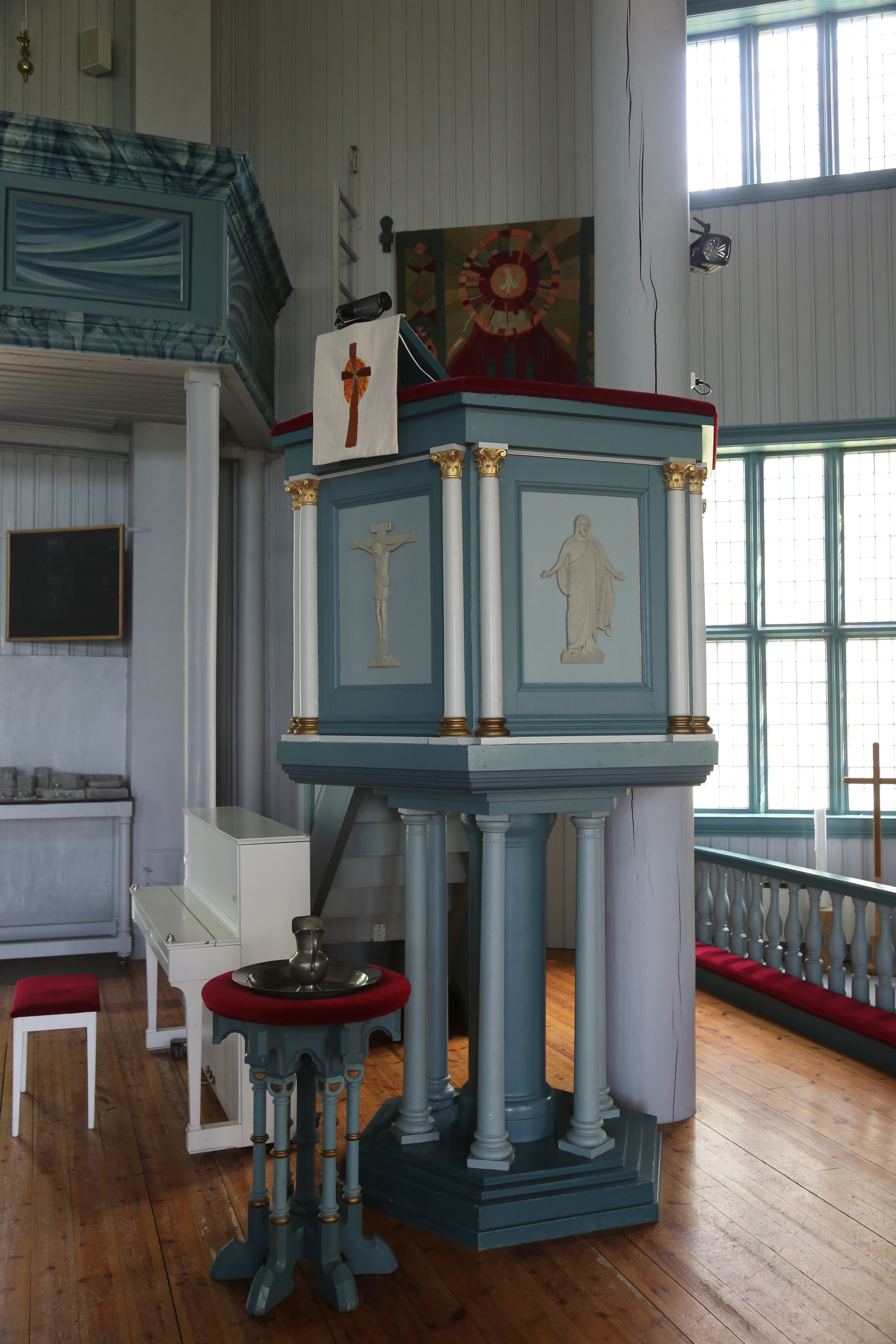

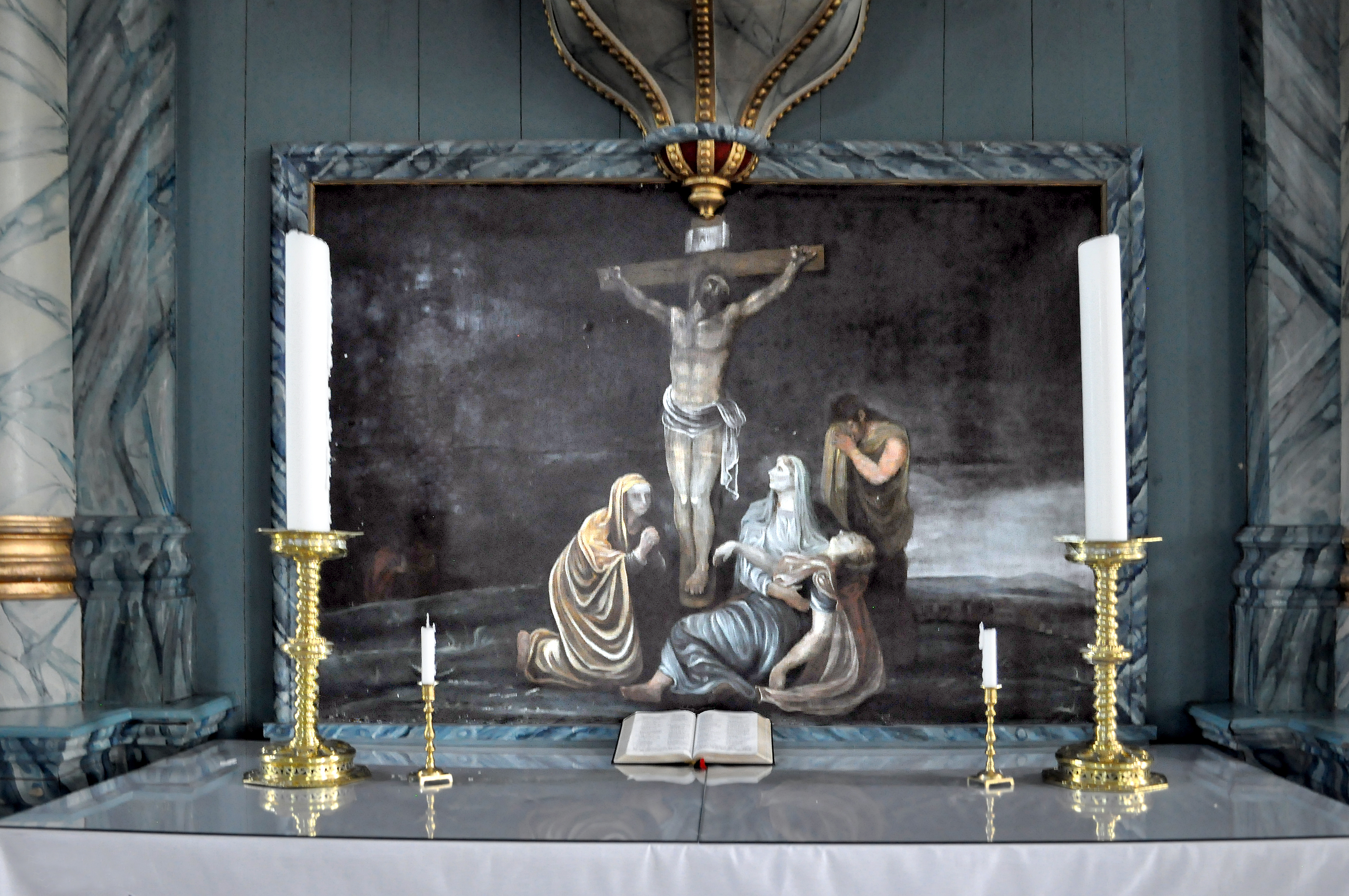

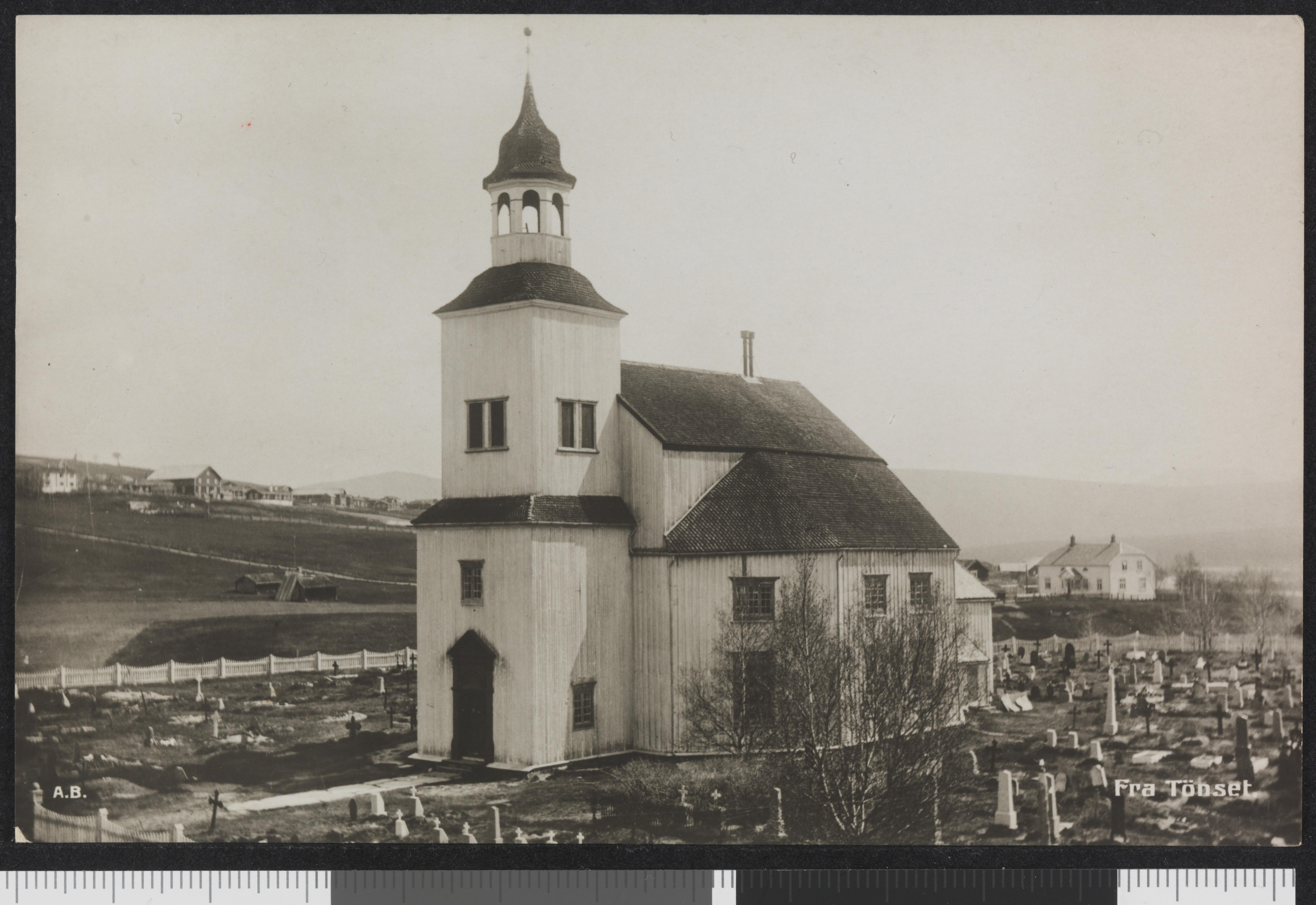

== See also ==
- List of churches in Hamar
