= Bersvend Salbu =

Norwegian farmer and politician

Bersvend Salbu (born 15 September 1968) is a Norwegian farmer and politician for the Socialist Left Party.

He served as a deputy representative to the Storting from Hedmark during the term 2013–2017. He also served as the mayor of Tynset Municipality from 2007 to 2015. He was re-elected in 2011. He was the first ever mayor from his party in Tynset Municipality.
