= Anders Rambech =

Norwegian politician

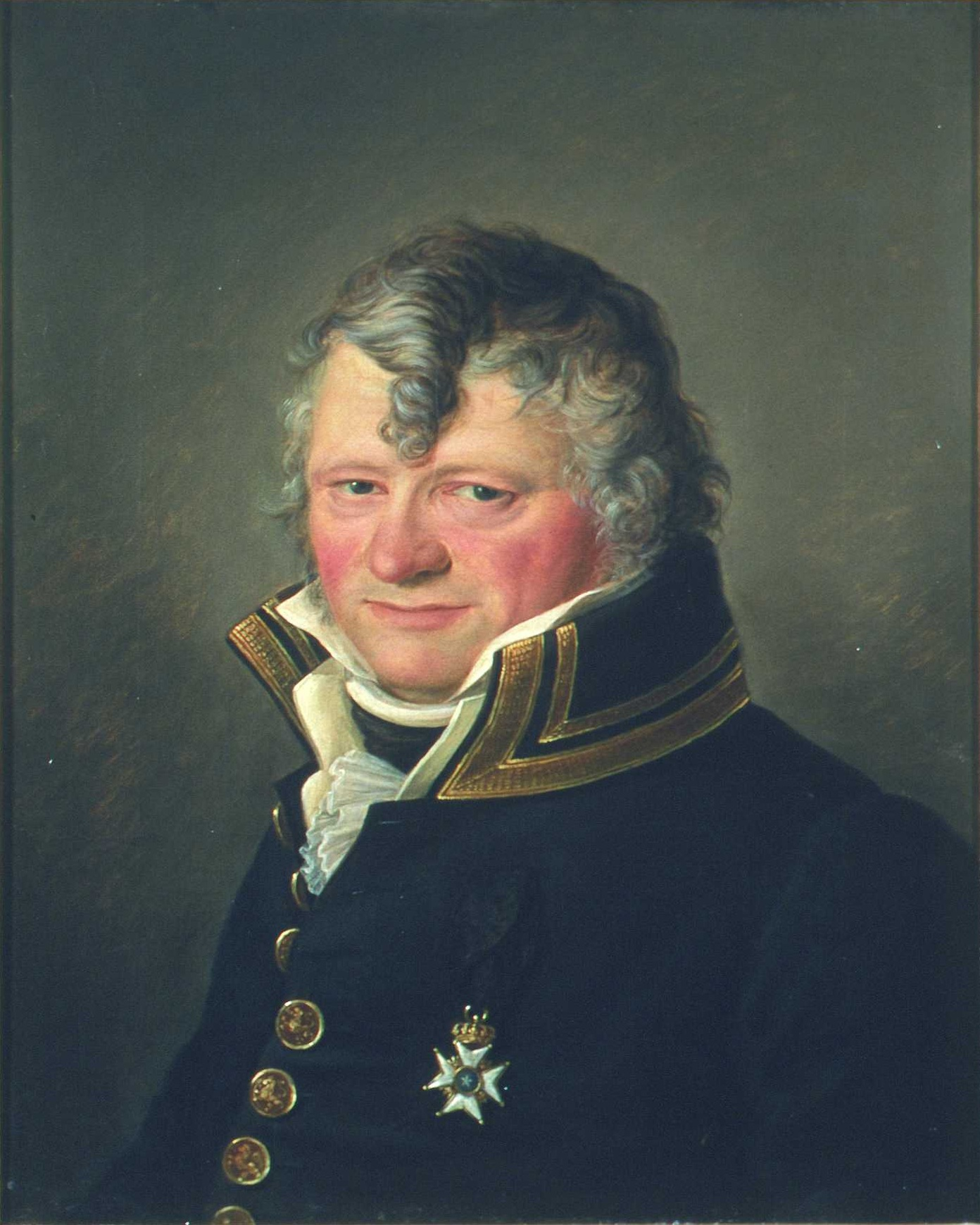
- Anders Rambech painted by Jacob Munch. The painting belongs to Eidsvoll 1814

Norwegian Constitutional Assembly
- In office 1814–1814

Personal details
- Born: 2 September 1767 Kvikne, Norway
- Died: 14 September 1836 (aged 69)
- Occupation: District stipendiary magistrate and politician

Anders Rambech (2 September 1767 – 14 September 1836) was a Norwegian district stipendiary magistrate and politician.

He was born at the mountain village of Kvikne (in the present-day Tynset Municipality) in Hedmark county, Norway. He worked as a clerk in the office of Magistrate of Orkdalen in Søndre Trondhjem county. In 1793, he graduated with a law degree from the University of Copenhagen. From 1800 he served as magistrate in Orkdalen. When the copper mines in his home town was closed in 1812, he arranged for assistance for the poor.

Anders Rambech represented Søndre Trondhjem county at the Norwegian Constituent Assembly in 1814, and was elected to the Parliament in 1815, 1818, 1824 and 1827.
