= Sivilla =

River in Innlandet, Norway

Location
- Country: Norway
- County: Innlandet
- Municipalities: Tynset and Alvdal

Physical characteristics
- Source: Savalen
  - location: Tynset, Norway
  - coordinates: 62°13′58″N 10°31′14″E
  - elevation: 708 metres (2,323 ft)
- Mouth: Glåma river at Strømmen
  - location: Alvdal, Norway
  - coordinates: 62°11′46″N 10°37′53″E
  - elevation: 476 metres (1,562 ft)
- Length: 9 km (5.6 mi)
- Basin size: 140 km^{2} (54 sq mi)

Sivilla is a river in Innlandet county, Norway. The 9-kilometre (5.6 mi) long river runs through Tynset Municipality and Alvdal Municipality, even forming part of the municipal boundary for part of its course. The river is the primary outflow of the lake Savalen, and ends up in the river Glåma.

The river begins at the southeastern side of the lake Savalen at a dam. The river's water is regulated at the dam, where the water is exploited by the 62-megawatt (83,000 hp) Savalen hydropower station.

== See also ==
- List of rivers in Norway
