= Tynset Municipality =

Municipality in Innlandet, Norway

Tynset Municipality Tynset kommune
- Municipality
- Tønset herred (historic name)
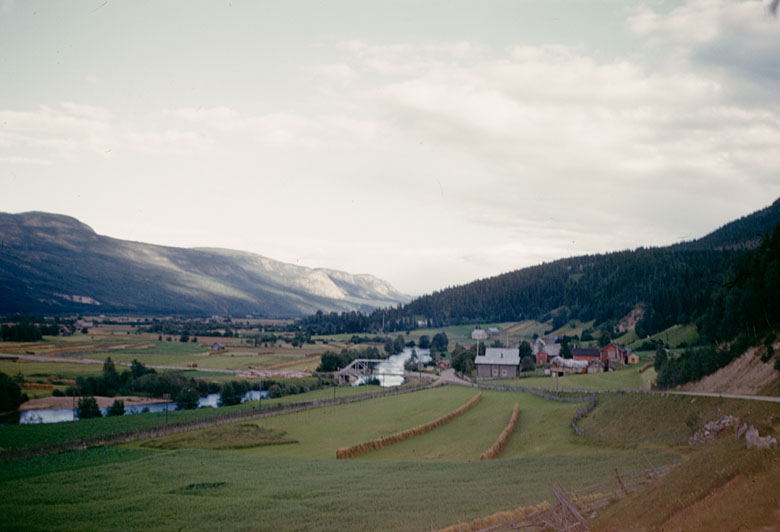
- View of the Tylldalen area

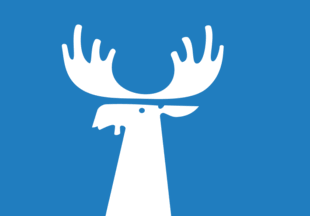
- Flag Coat of arms

- Innlandet within Norway

- Tynset within Innlandet
- Coordinates: 62°16′31″N 10°49′57″E
- Country: Norway
- County: Innlandet
- District: Østerdalen
- Established: 1 Jan 1838
  - Created as: Formannskapsdistrikt
- Administrative centre: Tynset

Government
  - Mayor (2015): Merete Myhre Moen (Sp)

Area
  - Total: 1,880.26 km^{2} (725.97 sq mi)
  - Land: 1,822.46 km^{2} (703.66 sq mi)
  - Water: 57.80 km^{2} (22.32 sq mi) 3.1%
  - Rank: #43 in Norway
- Highest elevation: 1,653.26 m (5,424.1 ft)

Population (2025)
  - Total: 5,722
  - Rank: #168 in Norway
  - Density: 3/km^{2} (7.8/sq mi)
  - Change (10 years): ▲ +2.6%
- Demonym: Tynseting

Official language
  - Norwegian form: Neutral
- Time zone: UTC+01:00 (CET)
  - Summer (DST): UTC+02:00 (CEST)
- ISO 3166 code: NO-3427
- Website: Official website

Tynset is a municipality in Innlandet county, Norway. It is located in the traditional district of Østerdalen. The administrative centre of the municipality is the town of Tynset. Some of the notable villages in Tynset include Fådalen, Fåset, Kvikne, Telneset, Tylldalen, and Yset.

The 1,880-square-kilometre (730 sq mi) municipality is the 43rd largest by area out of the 357 municipalities in Norway. Tynset Municipality is the 168th most populous municipality in Norway with a population of 5,722. The municipality's population density is 3 inhabitants per square kilometre (7.8/sq mi) and its population has increased by 2.6% over the previous 10-year period.

== General information ==
The parish of Tønsæt was established as a municipality on 1 January 1838 (see formannskapsdistrikt law). In 1864, the southern part of the municipality (population: 3,216) was separated to form the new Lille-Elvdal Municipality. This left Tynset Municipality with 2,975 residents. During the 1960s, there were many municipal mergers across Norway due to the work of the Schei Committee. On 1 January 1966, the neighboring Kvikne Municipality was dissolved and on that date the southern part of Kvikne Municipality (population: 664) was merged into Tynset Municipality (the northern part of Kvikne became part of Rennebu Municipality in Sør-Trøndelag county). On 1 January 1970, the Garlia farm (population: 5) was transferred from Tynset Municipality to the neighboring Rennebu Municipality (which also meant switching from Hedmark county to Sør-Trøndelag county). On 1 January 1984, the unpopulated Spekedalen area was transferred from Tynset Municipality to the neighboring Rendalen Municipality.

Historically, the municipality was part of Hedmark county. On 1 January 2020, the municipality became a part of the newly-formed Innlandet county (after Hedmark and Oppland counties were merged).

=== Name ===
The municipality (originally the parish) is named after the old Tynset farm (Old Norse: Tunnusetr) since the first Tynset Church was built there. The first element is the genitive case of the river name Tunna (now spelled Tonna). The meaning of the river name is not known. The last element is setr which means "mountain pasture" or "farm". Historically, the name of the municipality was spelled Tønset (pronounced Teunset with the "eu" diphthong equivalent to that in the French word bleu). On 3 November 1917, a royal resolution changed the spelling of the name of the municipality to Tynset.

=== Coat of arms ===
The coat of arms was granted on 18 October 1985. The official blazon is "Azure, a moose head issuant argent" (Norwegian: I blått et oppvoksende sølv elghode). This means the arms have a blue field (background) and the charge is a stylized moose head extending up from the base of the escutcheon. The moose head has a tincture of argent which means it is commonly colored white, but if it is made out of metal, then silver is used. The design was chosen to symbolize the abundance of moose in the area. The arms were designed by Nils Aas. The municipal flag has the same design as the coat of arms.

=== Churches ===
The Church of Norway has four parishes (sokn) within Tynset Municipality. It is part of the Nord-Østerdal prosti (deanery) in the Diocese of Hamar.

Churches in Tynset
Parish (sokn)	Church name	Location of the church	Year built
Brydalen	Brydalen Church	Brydalen	1883
Kvikne	Kvikne Church	Kvikne	1654
Tylldalen	Tylldalen Church	Tylldalen	1736
Tynset	Tynset Church	Tynset	1795

== Geography ==
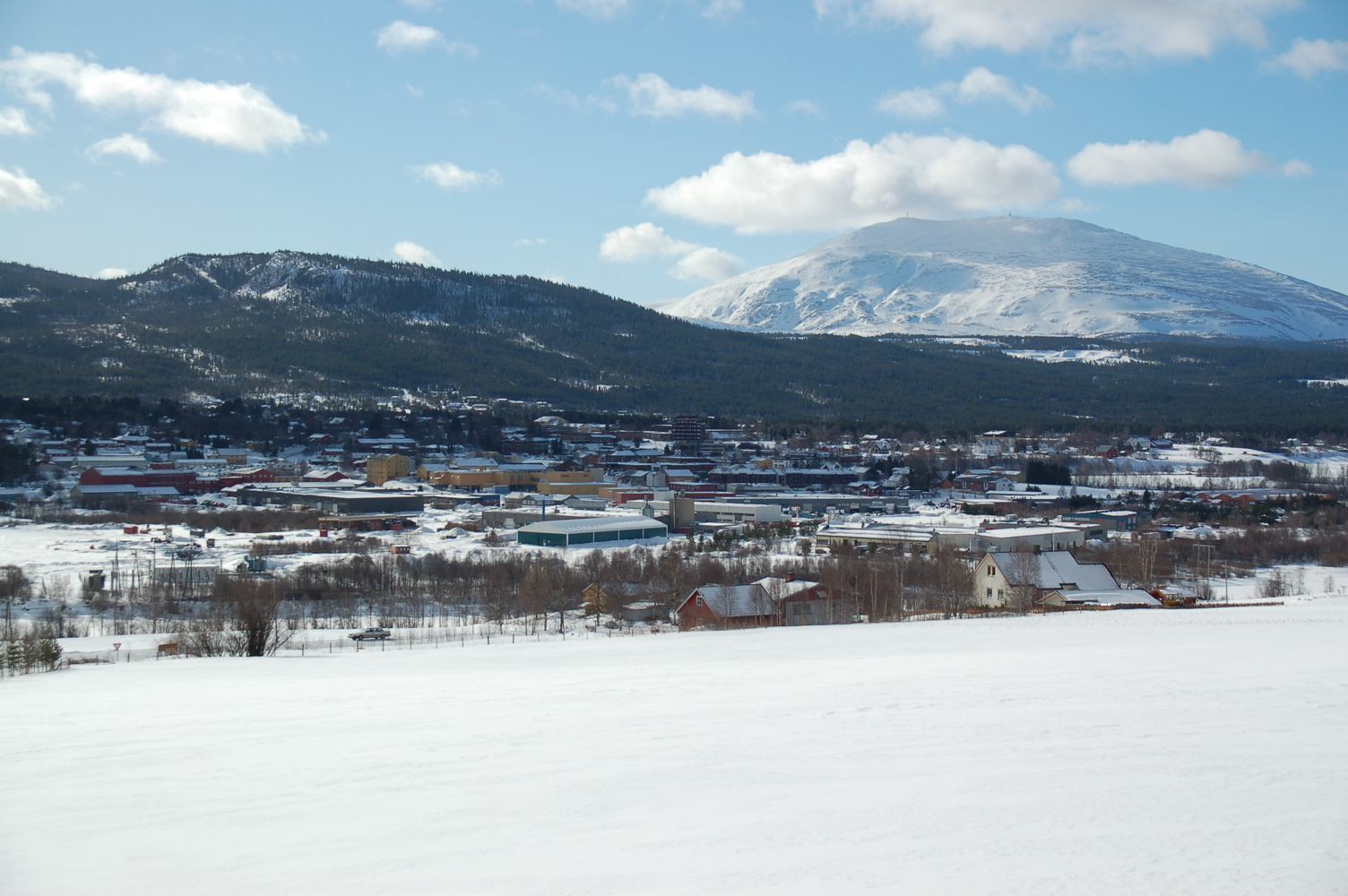
Tynset seen from northwest

Tynset is the urban centre for the northern Østerdalen part of Innlandet county in the central area of mainland Norway. Tynset Municipality lies in the upper quadrant of Norway's longest valley, Østerdalen, at an elevation of approximately 480 metres (1,574.8 ft) above sea level. To the northeast lies Tolga Municipality, to the south are Rendalen Municipality and Alvdal Municipality, to the west is Folldal Municipality, to the north are Rennebu Municipality and Midtre Gauldal Municipality (both in Trøndelag county), and to the west by Oppdal Municipality (also in Trøndelag county).

Tynset Municipality is known for its vast areas of forest and mountain, which are ideal for skiing, walking, cycling, hunting, and fishing. In many areas are signposted paths and ski tracks are ploughed in winter. The river Glåma has several side rivers including the Sivilla and Ya. The Fådalen valley and the lake Savalen have many tourist activities. The lakes Innerdalsvatnet and Falningsjøen also lie in the municipality. The highest point in the municipality is the 1,653.26-metre (5,424.1 ft) tall Tylldalstoppen, one of the lower peaks of the large mountain Tron which lies along the border with Alvdal Municipality.

Tynset Municipality has many wildlife areas including the geological formation at Ripan and Gammeldalen. At Ripan, there is a lake formed by glaciation during the last ice age and at Gammeldalen there are some beautifully formed corries from the same period.

Tynset has many historic mountain farms (seter) that are still in use in the high parts of the countryside. It is possible to visit these farms while hiking. Tynset Municipality also rents chalets, which used to belong to some of these mountain farms.

== Government ==
Tynset Municipality is responsible for primary education (through 10th grade), outpatient health services, senior citizen services, welfare and other social services, zoning, economic development, and municipal roads and utilities. The municipality is governed by a municipal council of directly elected representatives. The mayor is indirectly elected by a vote of the municipal council. The municipality is under the jurisdiction of the Hedmarken og Østerdal District Court and the Eidsivating Court of Appeal.

=== Municipal council ===
The municipal council (Kommunestyre) of Tynset Municipality is made up of 27 representatives that are elected to four year terms. The tables below show the current and historical composition of the council by political party.

Tynset kommunestyre 2023–2027
Party name (in Norwegian)	Number of representatives
Labour Party (Arbeiderpartiet)	7
Progress Party (Fremskrittspartiet)	1
Green Party (Miljøpartiet De Grønne)	2
Conservative Party (Høyre)	3
Pensioners' Party (Pensjonistpartiet)	1
Centre Party (Senterpartiet)	10
Socialist Left Party (Sosialistisk Venstreparti)	2
Liberal Party (Venstre)	1
Total number of members:	27

Tynset kommunestyre 2019–2023
Party name (in Norwegian)	Number of representatives
Labour Party (Arbeiderpartiet)	6
Green Party (Miljøpartiet De Grønne)	1
Conservative Party (Høyre)	2
Pensioners' Party (Pensjonistpartiet)	1
Centre Party (Senterpartiet)	14
Socialist Left Party (Sosialistisk Venstreparti)	2
Liberal Party (Venstre)	1
Total number of members:	27

Tynset kommunestyre 2015–2019
Party name (in Norwegian)	Number of representatives
Labour Party (Arbeiderpartiet)	6
Green Party (Miljøpartiet De Grønne)	1
Conservative Party (Høyre)	2
Christian Democratic Party (Kristelig Folkeparti)	1
Pensioners' Party (Pensjonistpartiet)	2
Centre Party (Senterpartiet)	12
Socialist Left Party (Sosialistisk Venstreparti)	2
Liberal Party (Venstre)	1
Total number of members:	27

Tynset kommunestyre 2011–2015
Party name (in Norwegian)	Number of representatives
Labour Party (Arbeiderpartiet)	6
Progress Party (Fremskrittspartiet)	1
Conservative Party (Høyre)	3
Christian Democratic Party (Kristelig Folkeparti)	1
Centre Party (Senterpartiet)	6
Socialist Left Party (Sosialistisk Venstreparti)	8
Liberal Party (Venstre)	1
Tynset List free voters (Tynsetlista frie velgere)	1
Total number of members:	27

Tynset kommunestyre 2007–2011
Party name (in Norwegian)	Number of representatives
Labour Party (Arbeiderpartiet)	4
Christian Democratic Party (Kristelig Folkeparti)	1
Centre Party (Senterpartiet)	10
Socialist Left Party (Sosialistisk Venstreparti)	5
Liberal Party (Venstre)	1
Tynset List free voters (Tynsetlista frie velgere)	6
Total number of members:	27

Tynset kommunestyre 2003–2007
Party name (in Norwegian)	Number of representatives
Labour Party (Arbeiderpartiet)	5
Progress Party (Fremskrittspartiet)	1
Conservative Party (Høyre)	2
Christian Democratic Party (Kristelig Folkeparti)	1
Centre Party (Senterpartiet)	14
Socialist Left Party (Sosialistisk Venstreparti)	3
Liberal Party (Venstre)	1
Total number of members:	27

Tynset kommunestyre 1999–2003
Party name (in Norwegian)	Number of representatives
Labour Party (Arbeiderpartiet)	8
Progress Party (Fremskrittspartiet)	1
Conservative Party (Høyre)	2
Christian Democratic Party (Kristelig Folkeparti)	1
Centre Party (Senterpartiet)	12
Socialist Left Party (Sosialistisk Venstreparti)	2
Liberal Party (Venstre)	1
Total number of members:	27

Tynset kommunestyre 1995–1999
Party name (in Norwegian)	Number of representatives
Labour Party (Arbeiderpartiet)	8
Conservative Party (Høyre)	2
Christian Democratic Party (Kristelig Folkeparti)	1
Centre Party (Senterpartiet)	12
Socialist Left Party (Sosialistisk Venstreparti)	2
Liberal Party (Venstre)	2
Total number of members:	27

Tynset kommunestyre 1991–1995
Party name (in Norwegian)	Number of representatives
Labour Party (Arbeiderpartiet)	9
Conservative Party (Høyre)	2
Christian Democratic Party (Kristelig Folkeparti)	1
Centre Party (Senterpartiet)	11
Socialist Left Party (Sosialistisk Venstreparti)	3
Liberal Party (Venstre)	1
Total number of members:	27

Tynset kommunestyre 1987–1991
Party name (in Norwegian)	Number of representatives
Labour Party (Arbeiderpartiet)	11
Conservative Party (Høyre)	3
Christian Democratic Party (Kristelig Folkeparti)	1
Centre Party (Senterpartiet)	9
Socialist Left Party (Sosialistisk Venstreparti)	2
Liberal Party (Venstre)	1
Total number of members:	27

Tynset kommunestyre 1983–1987
Party name (in Norwegian)	Number of representatives
Labour Party (Arbeiderpartiet)	9
Conservative Party (Høyre)	4
Christian Democratic Party (Kristelig Folkeparti)	1
Centre Party (Senterpartiet)	9
Socialist Left Party (Sosialistisk Venstreparti)	2
Liberal Party (Venstre)	2
Total number of members:	27

Tynset kommunestyre 1979–1983
Party name (in Norwegian)	Number of representatives
Labour Party (Arbeiderpartiet)	10
Conservative Party (Høyre)	4
Christian Democratic Party (Kristelig Folkeparti)	1
Centre Party (Senterpartiet)	9
Socialist Left Party (Sosialistisk Venstreparti)	1
Liberal Party (Venstre)	2
Total number of members:	27

Tynset kommunestyre 1975–1979
Party name (in Norwegian)	Number of representatives
Labour Party (Arbeiderpartiet)	10
Conservative Party (Høyre)	2
Christian Democratic Party (Kristelig Folkeparti)	2
Centre Party (Senterpartiet)	12
Socialist Left Party (Sosialistisk Venstreparti)	1
Total number of members:	27

Tynset kommunestyre 1971–1975
Party name (in Norwegian)	Number of representatives
Labour Party (Arbeiderpartiet)	12
Conservative Party (Høyre)	2
Christian Democratic Party (Kristelig Folkeparti)	1
Centre Party (Senterpartiet)	11
Liberal Party (Venstre)	1
Total number of members:	27

Tynset kommunestyre 1967–1971
Party name (in Norwegian)	Number of representatives
Labour Party (Arbeiderpartiet)	10
Conservative Party (Høyre)	2
Christian Democratic Party (Kristelig Folkeparti)	1
Centre Party (Senterpartiet)	12
Liberal Party (Venstre)	2
Total number of members:	27

Tynset kommunestyre 1963–1967
Party name (in Norwegian)	Number of representatives
Labour Party (Arbeiderpartiet)	6
Conservative Party (Høyre)	1
Christian Democratic Party (Kristelig Folkeparti)	1
Centre Party (Senterpartiet)	9
Liberal Party (Venstre)	1
List of workers, fishermen, and small farmholders (Arbeidere, fiskere, småbrukere liste)	3
Total number of members:	21
Note: On 1 January 1966, part of Kvikne Municipality became part of Tynset Municipality.

Tynset herredsstyre 1959–1963
Party name (in Norwegian)	Number of representatives
Labour Party (Arbeiderpartiet)	9
Centre Party (Senterpartiet)	10
Liberal Party (Venstre)	2
Total number of members:	21

Tynset herredsstyre 1955–1959
Party name (in Norwegian)	Number of representatives
Labour Party (Arbeiderpartiet)	8
Farmers' Party (Bondepartiet)	11
Liberal Party (Venstre)	2
Total number of members:	21

Tynset herredsstyre 1951–1955
Party name (in Norwegian)	Number of representatives
Labour Party (Arbeiderpartiet)	7
Farmers' Party (Bondepartiet)	7
Liberal Party (Venstre)	2
Total number of members:	16

Tynset herredsstyre 1947–1951
Party name (in Norwegian)	Number of representatives
Labour Party (Arbeiderpartiet)	7
Communist Party (Kommunistiske Parti)	1
Joint List(s) of Non-Socialist Parties (Borgerlige Felleslister)	8
Total number of members:	16

Tynset herredsstyre 1945–1947
Party name (in Norwegian)	Number of representatives
Labour Party (Arbeiderpartiet)	8
Communist Party (Kommunistiske Parti)	1
Farmers' Party (Bondepartiet)	4
Liberal Party (Venstre)	1
Joint List(s) of Non-Socialist Parties (Borgerlige Felleslister)	2
Total number of members:	16

Tynset herredsstyre 1937–1941*
Party name (in Norwegian)	Number of representatives
Labour Party (Arbeiderpartiet)	6
Farmers' Party (Bondepartiet)	5
Liberal Party (Venstre)	2
Joint List(s) of Non-Socialist Parties (Borgerlige Felleslister)	3
Total number of members:	16
Note: Due to the German occupation of Norway during World War II, no elections were held for new municipal councils until after the war ended in 1945.

=== Mayors ===
The mayor (Norwegian: ordfører) of Tynset Municipality is the political leader of the municipality and the chairperson of the municipal council. Here is a list of people who have held this position:

- 1838–1839: Ansten Embretsen
- 1839–1843: Andreas Lie Bull
- 1843–1847: Ansten Embretsen
- 1847–1849: Nils Nilsen
- 1849–1851: Ole J. Hansen
- 1851–1855: Ole Madsen Fløtten
- 1855–1857: Ole J. Hansen
- 1857–1869: Jon Steen
- 1869–1873: Melchior Tangen
- 1873–1893: Lars Hektoen
- 1893–1898: Tore Aaen
- 1899–1901: Ole J. Steen
- 1902–1904: Tore Aaen
- 1905–1910: Ole J. Steen
- 1910–1919: Hans Bakker (V)
- 1920–1928: Olaf Rønning (V)
- 1929–1934: Hans E. Eggen (Bp)
- 1935–1940: Bersvend Ordertrøen (V)
- 1941–1945: Per N. Mælen (NS)
- 1945–1945: Bersvend Ordertrøen (V)
- 1946–1947: Bernhard Øyan (Ap)
- 1948–1951: Bersvend Ordertrøen (V)
- 1952–1956: Per E. Hansæl (Bp)
- 1957–1959: Annar Aaen (Bp)
- 1959–1971: Per Often (Sp)
- 1971–1987: Per N. Hagen (Sp)
- 1987–1991: Gunnar Jacobsen (Ap)
- 1991–1999: Olav Distad (Sp)
- 1999–2005: Dag Henrik Sandbakken (Sp)
- 2005–2007: Borgar Valle (Sp)
- 2007–2015: Bersvend Salbu (SV)
- 2015–present: Merete Myhre Moen (Sp)

== Climate ==
Tynset Municipality has a boreal climate (continental subarctic climate). Situated inland on the valley floor at a 480-metre (1,570 ft) altitude and sheltered by mountain ranges, Tynset can see strong inversion for long periods. The all-time low is −46.6 °C (−51.9 °F) from 1 February 1912, (Tynset-Åkrann), and the January record low is −46.1 °C (−51.0 °F) from 1 January 1979. In the European cold snap of January 2010 Tynset recorded low of −42.4 °C (−44.3 °F). Tynset has recorded the coldest June low for a place in mainland Norway with −7.9 °C (17.8 °F) on 1 June 1907. The all-time high is 31.4 °C (88.5 °F) recorded 25 June 2020, while July has seen 31.3 °C (88.3 °F) on 27 July 2008. Tynset sees sparse precipitation with only 440 mm (17.3 in) annually, with February - April as the driest season.

Climate data for Tynset 1991-2020 (482 m)
Month	Jan	Feb	Mar	Apr	May	Jun	Jul	Aug	Sep	Oct	Nov	Dec	Year
Mean daily maximum °C (°F)	−6 (21)	−3 (27)	2 (36)	7 (45)	12 (54)	17 (63)	19 (66)	18 (64)	13 (55)	6 (43)	−1 (30)	−6 (21)	7 (44)
Daily mean °C (°F)	−9.1 (15.6)	−8.6 (16.5)	−4 (25)	1.5 (34.7)	6.3 (43.3)	10.4 (50.7)	13.7 (56.7)	11.9 (53.4)	7.5 (45.5)	1 (34)	−3.7 (25.3)	−9.5 (14.9)	1.5 (34.6)
Mean daily minimum °C (°F)	−14 (7)	−12 (10)	−10 (14)	−4 (25)	1 (34)	5 (41)	8 (46)	7 (45)	3 (37)	−1 (30)	−6 (21)	−13 (9)	−3 (27)
Average precipitation mm (inches)	28.2 (1.11)	22.2 (0.87)	19 (0.7)	18.1 (0.71)	38.1 (1.50)	55 (2.2)	66.9 (2.63)	68.4 (2.69)	37 (1.5)	30.8 (1.21)	28.8 (1.13)	27.3 (1.07)	439.8 (17.32)
Source 1:
Source 2:

Climate data for Tynset 1961-1990
Month	Jan	Feb	Mar	Apr	May	Jun	Jul	Aug	Sep	Oct	Nov	Dec	Year
Mean daily maximum °C (°F)	−9 (16)	−4 (24)	2 (35)	7 (44)	12 (53)	16 (61)	17 (63)	17 (62)	12 (53)	6 (43)	−2 (29)	−5 (23)	6 (42)
Mean daily minimum °C (°F)	−18 (−1)	−15 (5)	−12 (10)	−3 (26)	0 (32)	5 (41)	6 (43)	6 (43)	2 (36)	−2 (29)	−8 (18)	−14 (7)	−4 (24)
Average precipitation mm (inches)	18 (0.7)	15 (0.6)	7.6 (0.3)	10 (0.4)	38 (1.5)	84 (3.3)	86 (3.4)	81 (3.2)	28 (1.1)	18 (0.7)	13 (0.5)	15 (0.6)	410 (16.1)
Source: Weatherbase

== Transportation ==
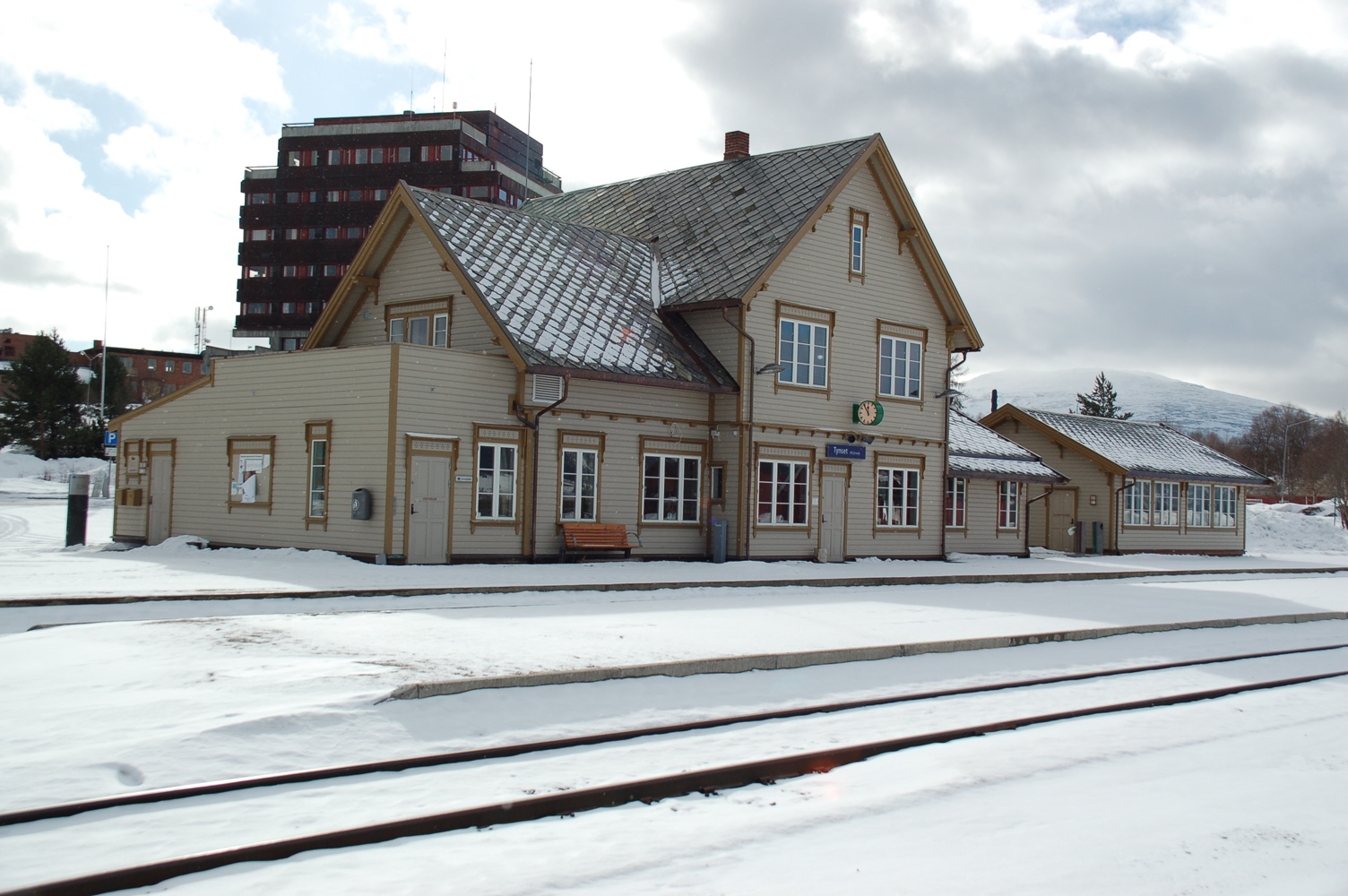
Tynset railway station

The municipality can be reached via railroad, road, and air. The main Norwegian National Road 3 runs through the municipality (it is the shortest route between the cities of Oslo and Trondheim). The Rondevegen road connects Tynset to Lillehammer (to the south), Røros (to the northeast), and continues further into Sweden. County Road 30, which passes through Rendalen Municipality, also continues through Tynset into Sweden. The Rørosbanen railway line connects Tynset with the major cities of Oslo and Trondheim. Røros Airport, 55 kilometres (34.2 mi) away, is part of the national network. Tynset also hosts an aerodrome that is used by smaller aircraft.

=== Kickers ===
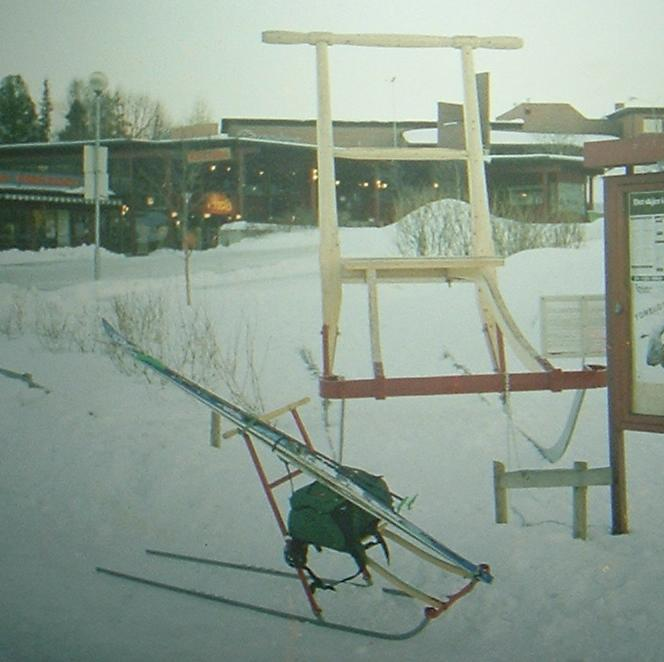
Giant kicker in Tynset Square

The traditional Norwegian form of transportation, the "kicker" (spark), is still produced in Tynset. It is made in two versions: Rappen and Tarzan. The world's largest kicker is located in the Tynset Square in the town of Tynset. This sculpture is four times the size of a normal kicker.

== Economy ==
Tynset is the urban centre of the Nord-Østerdalen region. Although it is a modern business and shopping centre with a wide variety of commercial activities, agriculture and forestry are still the traditional ways of making a living. Municipal administration and service industries, such as the computer industry, law, finance, and construction are also beginning to play an increasing role. Tynset has most of the functions of a regional centre because of its schools and hospital, and many of the region's intermunicipal services have naturally been positioned in Tynset: The Family Centre, Centre for School Psychology, and others. A factory in Tynset used to produce latex Troll souvenirs, but production moved abroad and it no longer does this.

== Culture ==
Number of minorities (1st and 2nd generation) in Tynset by country of origin in 2017
Ancestry	Number
Poland	125
Lithuania	91
Somalia	77
Eritrea	45
Thailand	37
Afghanistan	36
Syria	34

Tynset has a rich cultural life with a huge range of organisations in sports, music, drama, the arts, and youth work.

Kulturhuset

The Centre for The Arts (kulturhuset) opened in 1988. The centre houses concerts, plays, a cinema, library, art exhibitions, rehearsals, reunions, conferences, and festivals. The Kulturhuset also has a café.

Tynsethallene

Tynset's first sports hall (Tynsethallen) was built in 1986. A second sports hall (Holmenhallen) was opened ten years later. A swimming pool and smaller gymnastics gall in the building connects them to form a complete set of sports facilities.

Savalen

Savalen is known internationally for its speed skating ice rink, where many national and international records have been achieved. Savalen has also developed a football pitch, an arena for Nordic skiing and biathlon, a roller skiing track, an alpine area, and 90 kilometres (55.9 mi) of cross-country skiing tracks. The Savalen area has become a place that is specially designed for the handicapped, which includes wheelchair paths and a specially equipped fishing pier. Savalen has become a well-known holiday and vacation area.

Early Skateboard in Norway

Tynset had one of Norway's very first pro skateboard vert ramp, it was constructed 1981-82 by Erik Snedsbøl and located in the forest near Tela Sag & Høvleri on Telneset. It was one of the first pro vert-ramp's during the prohibition period (1978–89) in Norway. From 7 September 1978 to 9 May 1989, skateboarding was completely banned in Norway. At that time, Norway was the only country in the world where it was forbidden to sell, buy or stand on a skateboard. The ban was introduced by the Nordli government and lifted by the Brundtland government, both emanating from Arbeiderpartiet (Norwegian Labour Party). Snedsbøl's skateboard ramp was the first to get permission for use in Norway during the prohibition period, and contributed to the softening of the Law of Norway. The newspaper Arbeidets Rett by Jan E. Øvergård published an article on 12 October 1983. The ramp was later published in the Swedish skateboard magazine Uppåt Väggarna (no. 5/6, 1983).

== Notable people ==
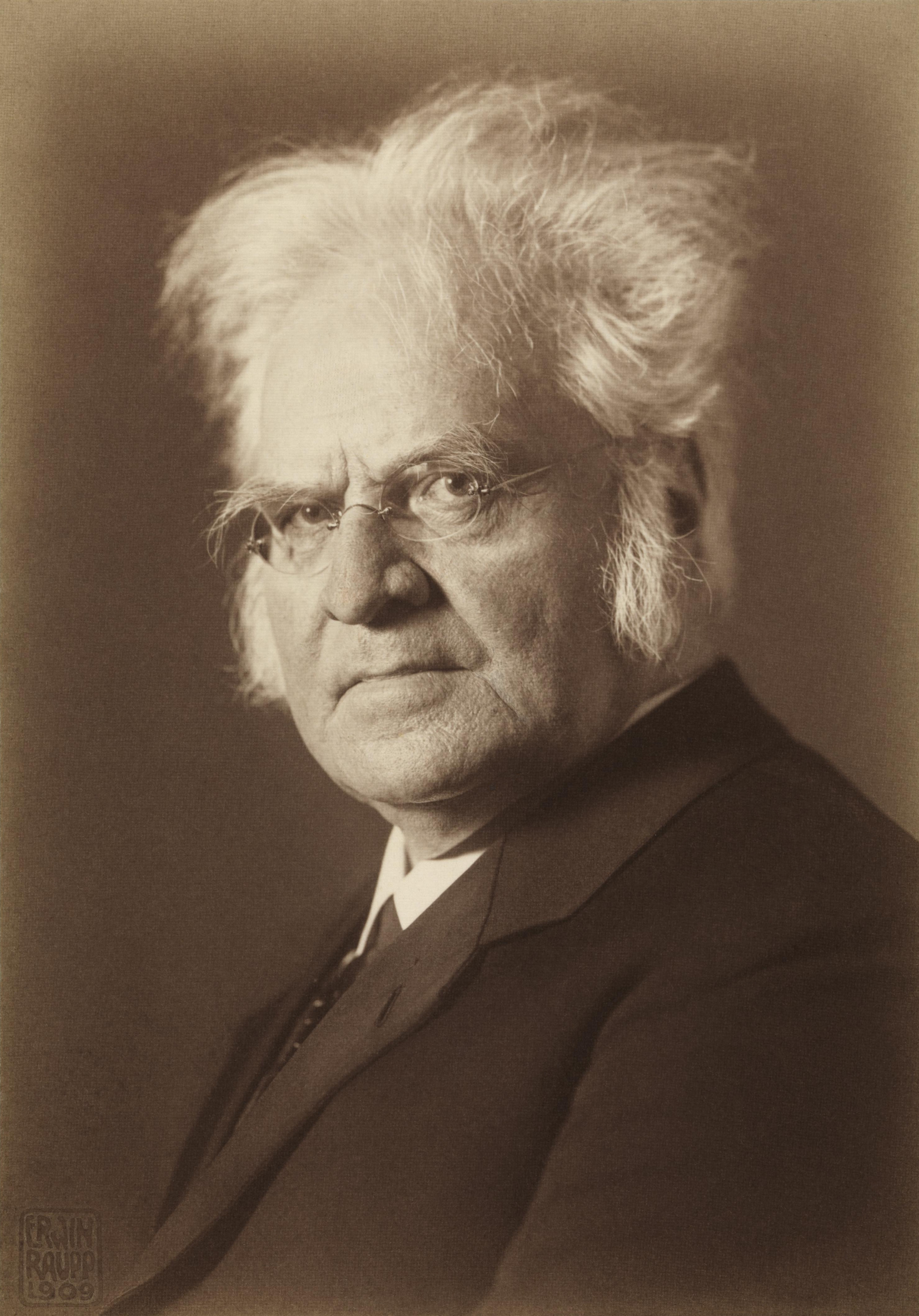
Bjørnstjerne Bjørnson, 1909

- Anders Rambech (1767 in Kvikne – 1836), a district stipendiary magistrate and politician
- Bjørnstjerne Bjørnson (1832 in Kvikne – 1910), a poet and writer who received the 1903 Nobel Prize in Literature.
- Odd Aukrust (1915 in Tynset – 2008), an economist
- Olav Gjærevoll (1916 Tynset – 1994), a botanist, academic and politician
- Fridtjof Frank Gundersen (1934 in Tynset – 2011), a professor of jurisprudence and politician
- Gert Nygårdshaug (born 1946 at Tynset), an author of poems, children's books and crime novels
- Bersvend Salbu (born 1968), a farmer, politician and Mayor of Tynset 2007-2015
- Ellen Brekken (born 1985 in Tynset), a jazz musician, plays upright bass, bass guitar and the tuba

=== Sport ===
- Willy Olsen (born 1950 in Tynset), a retired speed skater, competed at the 1972 Winter Olympics
- Solrun Flatås (born 1967 in Tynset), a cyclist, competed at the 2000 Summer Olympics
- Tor Halvor Bjørnstad (born 1978), a retired cross-country skier, biathlete and winter triathlete; lives in Tynset
- Kai Olav Ryen (born 1978 in Tynset), a footballer with 223 club caps
- Ole Erik Midtskogen (born 1995 in Tynset), a footballer playing for Eliteserien club Odds Ballklubb

== Attractions ==
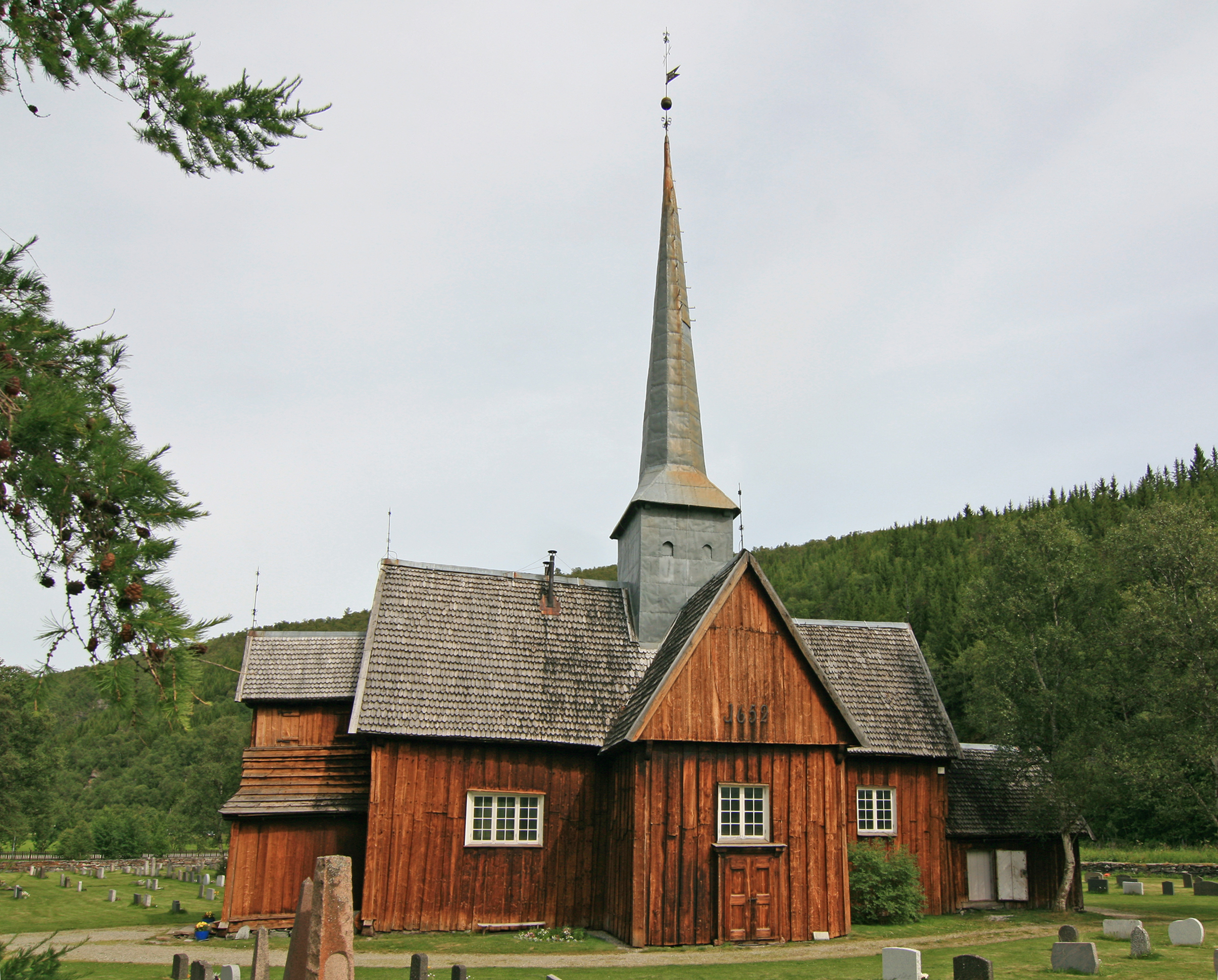
Kvikne Church

The following are some of the attractions in the area. The distance from the municipal center of Tynset is shown.

- Kvikne Mines in Odden. The remains of mining operations begun in 1632. (60 min.)
- Kvikne Church. A cruciform timber church built in 1652, with a richly decorated interior. The altar is an example of one of Norway's finest Renaissance altarpieces and the church is adorned with staves (planks) on which one can see Viking graffiti, an 11th-century crucifix and other artifacts from the Viking period. (45 min.)
- Vollan Farm and Chapel. The farm was originally built in the mining period, the earliest part of which dates from the 17th century. This is one of the few farms in the country with its own private chapel. (45 min.)
- Vollandagan: An annual festival connected with the traditional life of Vollan.
- Bjørgan parsonage, Kvikne. The birthplace of the author Bjørnstjerne Bjørnson. (50 min.)
- Soapstone quarry, Kvikneskogen, dates from 400 to 600 BC. (30 min. + 45 min. on foot).
- Røstvangen Mines. The remains of a mining community from the beginning of the 20th century. It survived for only 17 years and was ruined by the greatest bankruptcy of the period. (25 min. + 15 min. on foot).
- Eidsfossen Power Station, a decommissioned hydroelectric plant 5 km south of Yset that formerly powered the Røstvangen Mines.
- Tynset Bygdemuseum. Tynset's village museum is 1 kilometer from the town centre and contains exemplar housing from early times to the present.
- Tynset Church. An octagonal church that was built in 1795 by the architect of a larger example in Røros. The church displays a fine, gilded pulpit over the altar, which is peculiar to this area of Norway. A smaller copy of this church was built in 1825 as Bardu Church in Bardu in the northern county of Troms by the contractor (and native of Tynset) Ola Olsen Lundberg and is accurate many details.
- Ramsmoen museumssenter: Exhibitions throughout the year, located in the centre of Tynset.
- Garborgdagan. An annual festival built around the work of the authors Hulda Garborg and Arne Garborg. Held in Tynset kulturhus and at Kolbotn, Garborg's home for many years.
- Tynsetutstillinga. An annual exhibition held in Galleri Elgen in Tynset kulturhus, featuring well-known Norwegian artists.
- Tylldalen Church. Built in 1736, the rich wall painting survived the puritan period by being painted over, thus preserving its original colours. A fine altar dominates the sanctuary and fine ceiling paintings, displaying the Swedish royal arms, make this a fine example of Norwegian late-baroque architecture.
- Tylldalen bygdetun. Tylldalen's village museum (20 min.) A biennial play for St. Olav's Day is Norway's second oldest historical outdoor play.
