= Tylldalen Church =

Church in Innlandet, Norway

- Tylldalen kirke
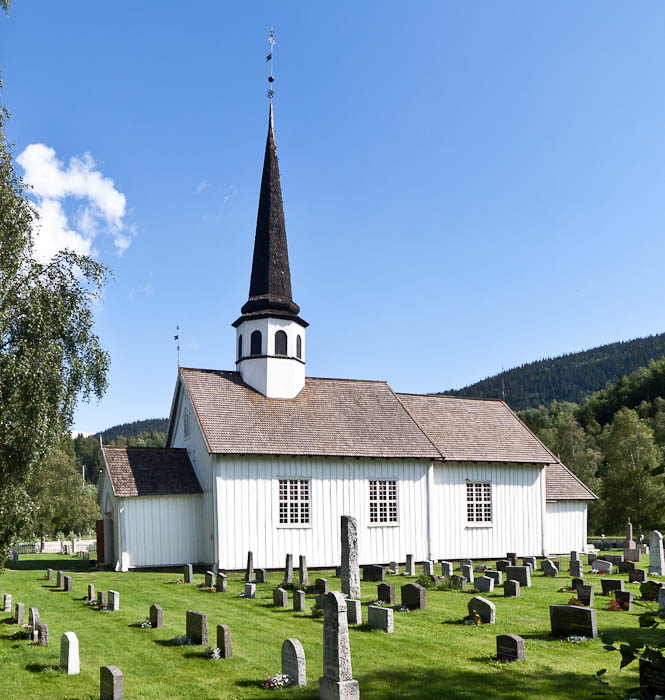
- View of the church
- Tylldalen Church
- 62°08′14″N 10°47′44″E
- Location: Tynset Municipality, Innlandet
- Country: Norway
- Denomination: Church of Norway
- Previous denomination: Catholic Church
- Churchmanship: Evangelical Lutheran

History
- Status: Parish church
- Founded: 12th century
- Consecrated: 1736

Architecture
- Functional status: Active
- Architect: Karl Brandvold
- Architectural type: Long church
- Completed: 1736 (290 years ago)

Specifications
- Capacity: 240
- Materials: Wood

Administration
- Diocese: Hamar bispedømme
- Deanery: Nord-Østerdal prosti
- Parish: Tylldalen
- Norwegian Cultural Heritage Site
- Type: Church
- Status: Automatically protected
- ID: 85693

Tylldalen Church (Norwegian: Tylldalen kirke) is a parish church of the Church of Norway in Tynset Municipality in Innlandet county, Norway. It is located in the village of Tylldalen. It is the church for the Tylldalen parish which is part of the Nord-Østerdal prosti (deanery) in the Diocese of Hamar. The white, wooden church was built in a long church design in 1736 using plans drawn up by the architect Karl Brandvold. The church seats about 240 people.

== History ==
The first church in Tylldalen was a wooden church, possibly a stave church, that was built during the 12th century. This church was located about 900 metres (3,000 ft) northeast of the present church site. It was fairly quickly replaced by a new and larger church on the same site, perhaps in the first half of the 1200s. Around the year 1381, the church was torn down and replaced with a new building. In 1598, the old church was torn down and replaced with a new timber-framed building.

In 1660, the church burned down and a new church was built soon after, however, the church site was moved about 900 metres (3,000 ft) to the southwest, closer to the main road through the valley. This church was built around 1660 and lasted until 1733 when it was torn down and replaced with a new building on the same site. Karl Brandvold and son Arne were hired to design and build the new church. The new building was consecrated on 2 March 1736 by the Bishop of Oslo, Peder Hersleb.

== Media gallery ==
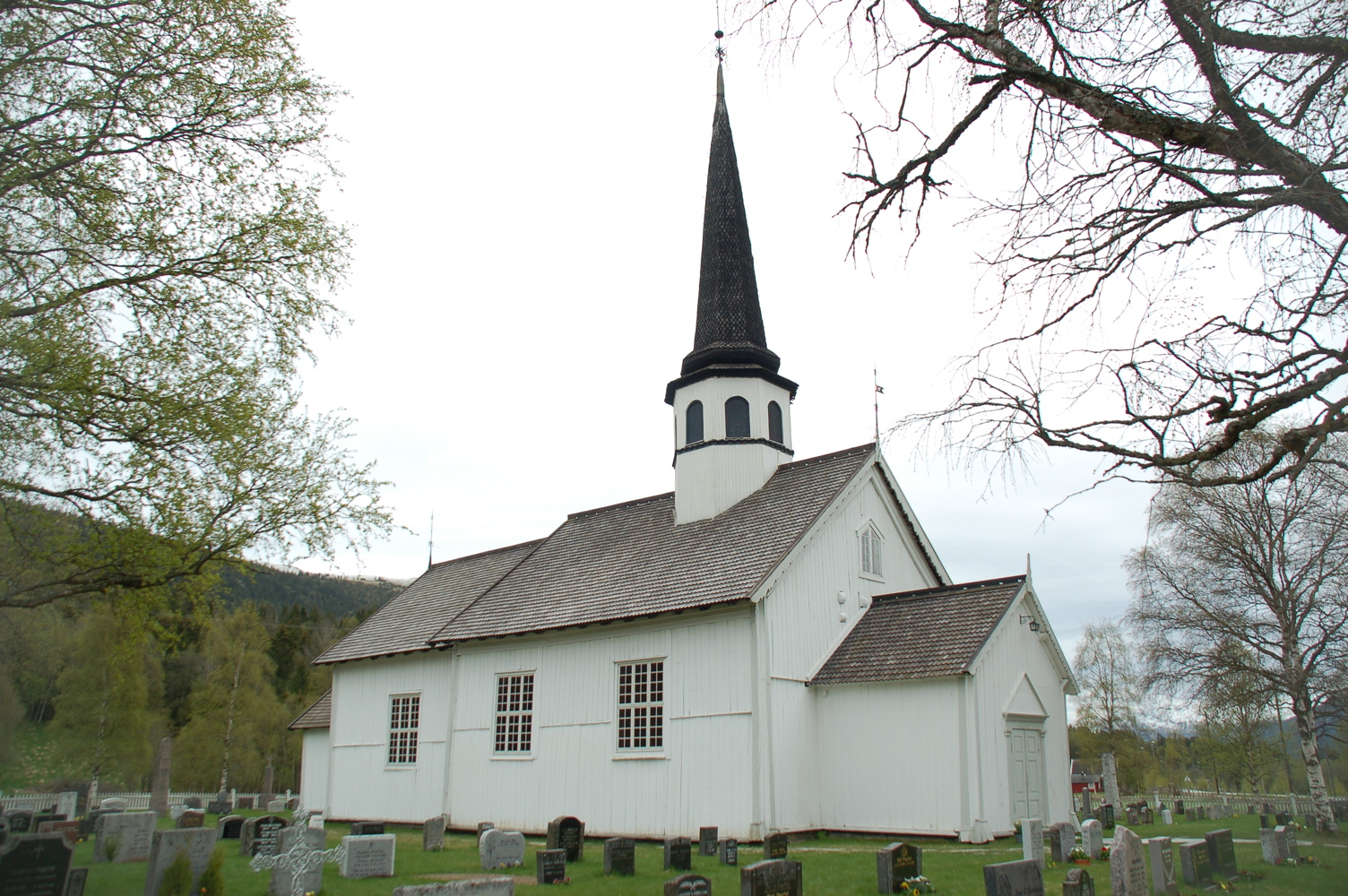

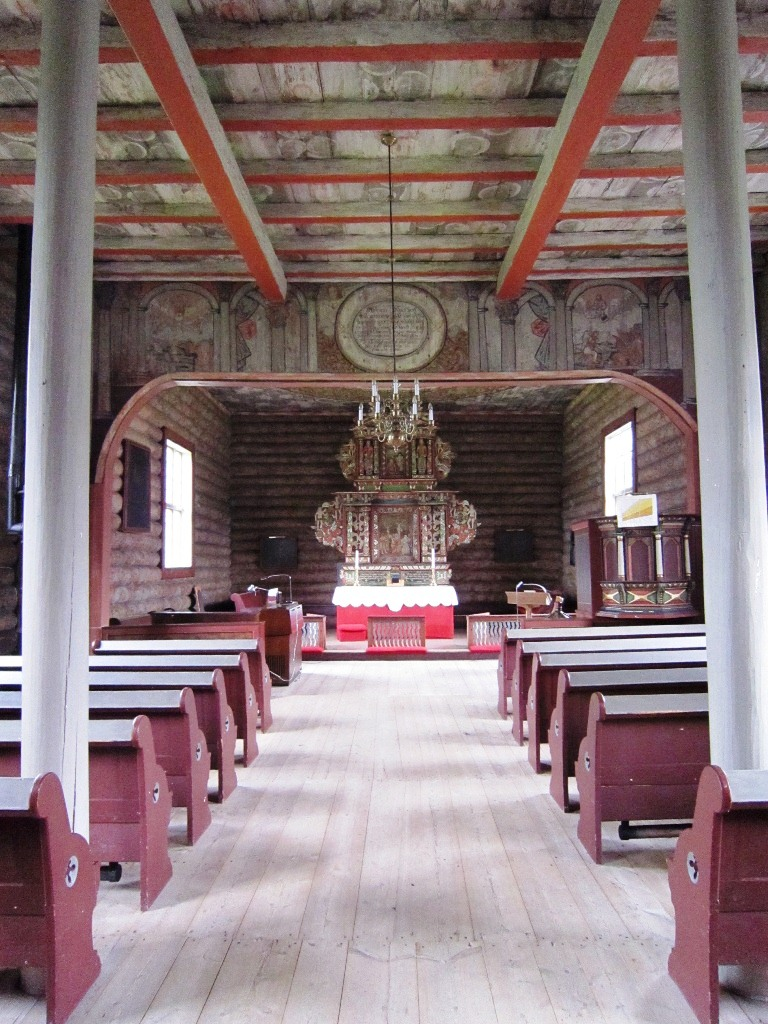

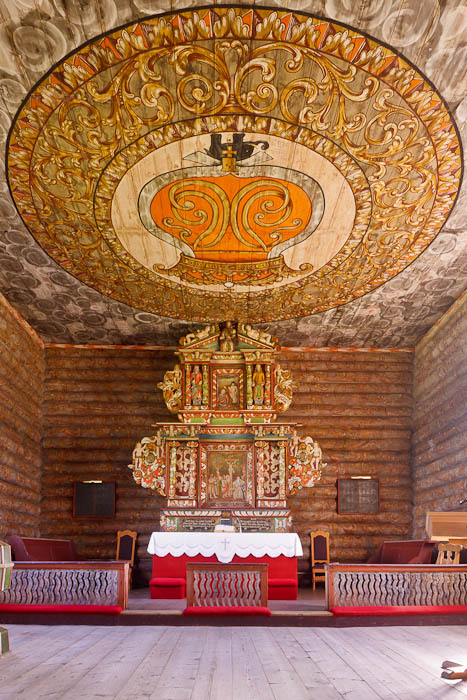

== See also ==
- List of churches in Hamar
