= Røstvangen Mines =

Norwegian mining company

Coordinates: 62°22′59.63″N 10°24′23.81″E

- Native name: Røstvangen gruver
- Founded: 1904
- Defunct: 1921
- Products: Copper
- Number of employees: 260 (1919)

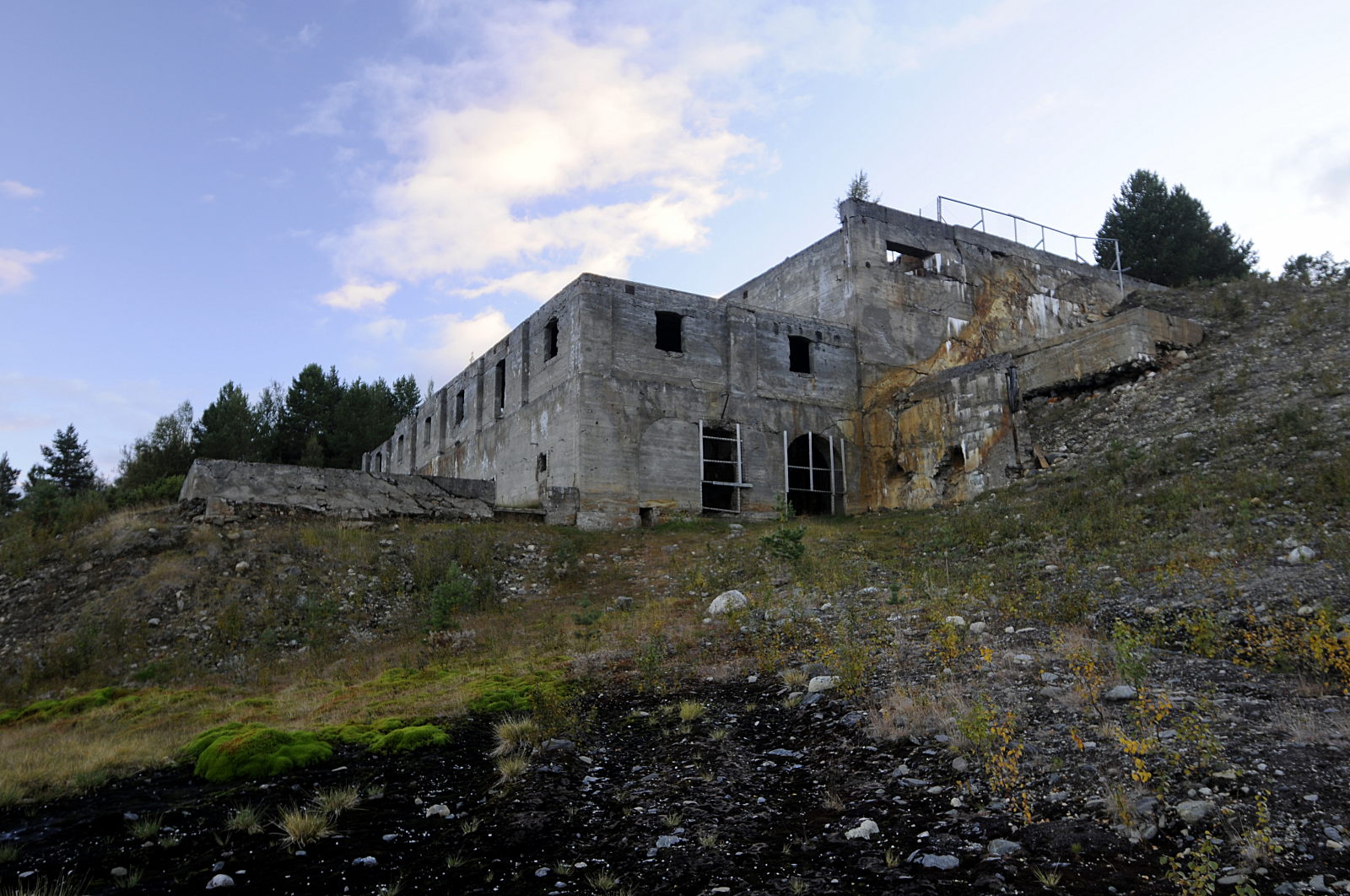
Ruins of the "new" ore-washing facility at the mines

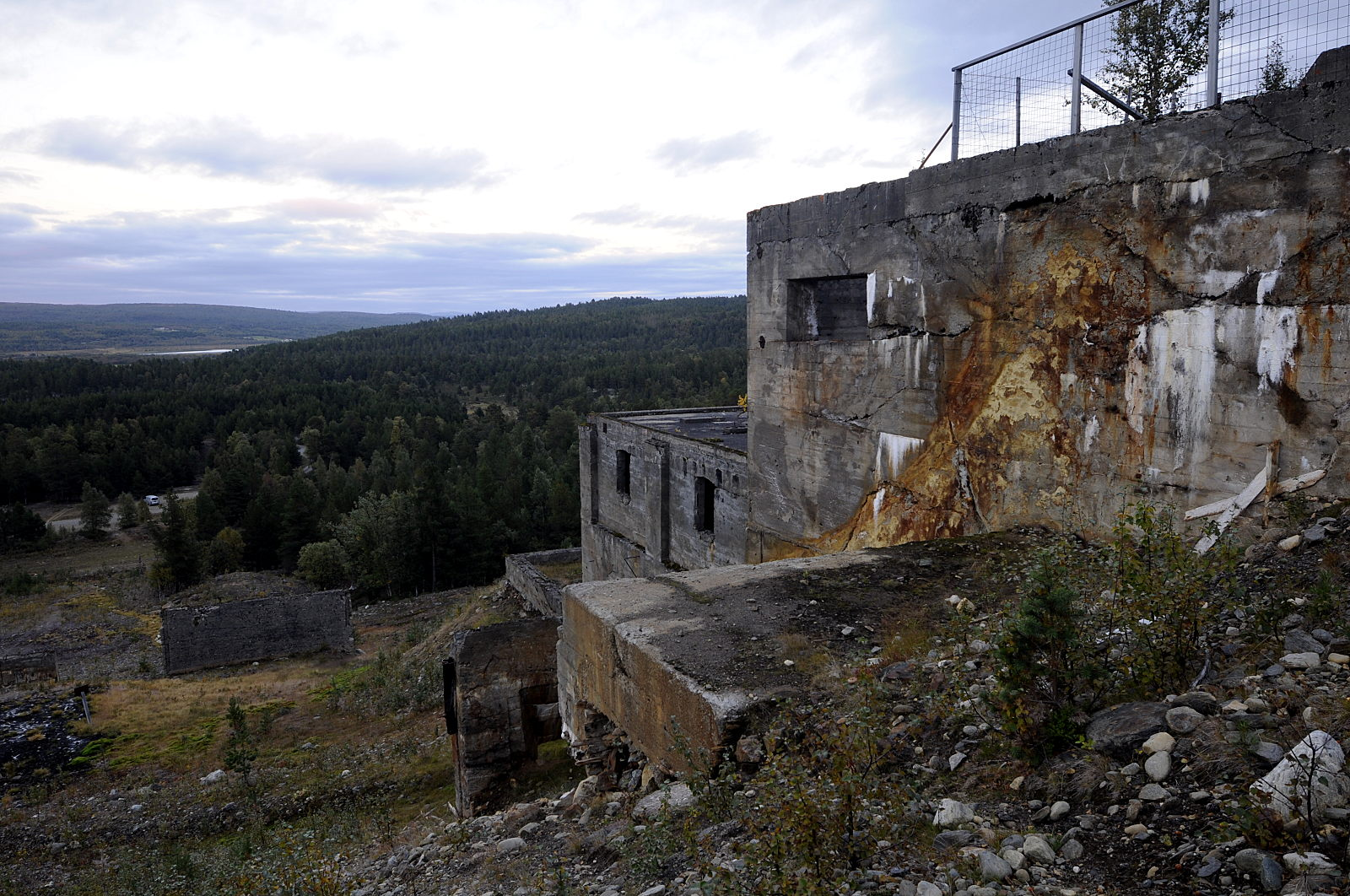
View from the mines toward Tynset

Røstvangen Mines (Norwegian: Røstvangen gruver) was a Norwegian mining company that extracted copper in the area between Kvikne and Tynset in Norway's Østerdalen district. The mining operations at the Røstvangen ore field were begun in 1904 and ran continuously until 1921, when the company went bankrupt. Copper-bearing pyrite was extracted at the mine.

The mines were equipped with a laundry, post office, bakery, meeting hall, residential buildings, barracks, shops, and even a movie theater. The defunct Eidsfossen Hydroelectric Power Station was originally built to supply electricity to the Røstvangen Mines.

From 1904 to 1909 there were 100 employees at the Røstvangen Mines. Between 1909 and 1915, the workforce was expanded to 170, and from 1916 to 1919 that number rose to 260. A downturn started in 1919, when the mines began experiencing economic problems. When the company went bankrupt in 1921, it had 120 employees.

== Cableway ==
On February 18, 1910, a cableway was opened for transporting ore from the mine down to Tynset. It had more than 100 ore buckets and the transit time to Tynset was two hours and ten minutes. Each bucket could hold over 300 kg of ore, and almost 30 people worked daily on the cableway. After the ore was taken to Tynset, it was transported to Trondheim on the Røros Line railway and then sent for processing abroad by ship.

== Bankruptcy ==
The company went bankrupt in 1921. This was one of the largest bankruptcies in Norwegian history at that time. After the bankruptcy, all of the machinery was removed. Most of the houses and other buildings were demolished or blown apart, except for the largest structures, including the Heim building in Tynset and the Vidarheim building in Tolga. All of the workers moved away from the place immediately. Most relocated out of the district, but some remained in places near Røstvangen.
