= Eidsfossen Hydroelectric Power Station =

Hydroelectric power station in Tynset, Norway

Eidsfossen Power Station
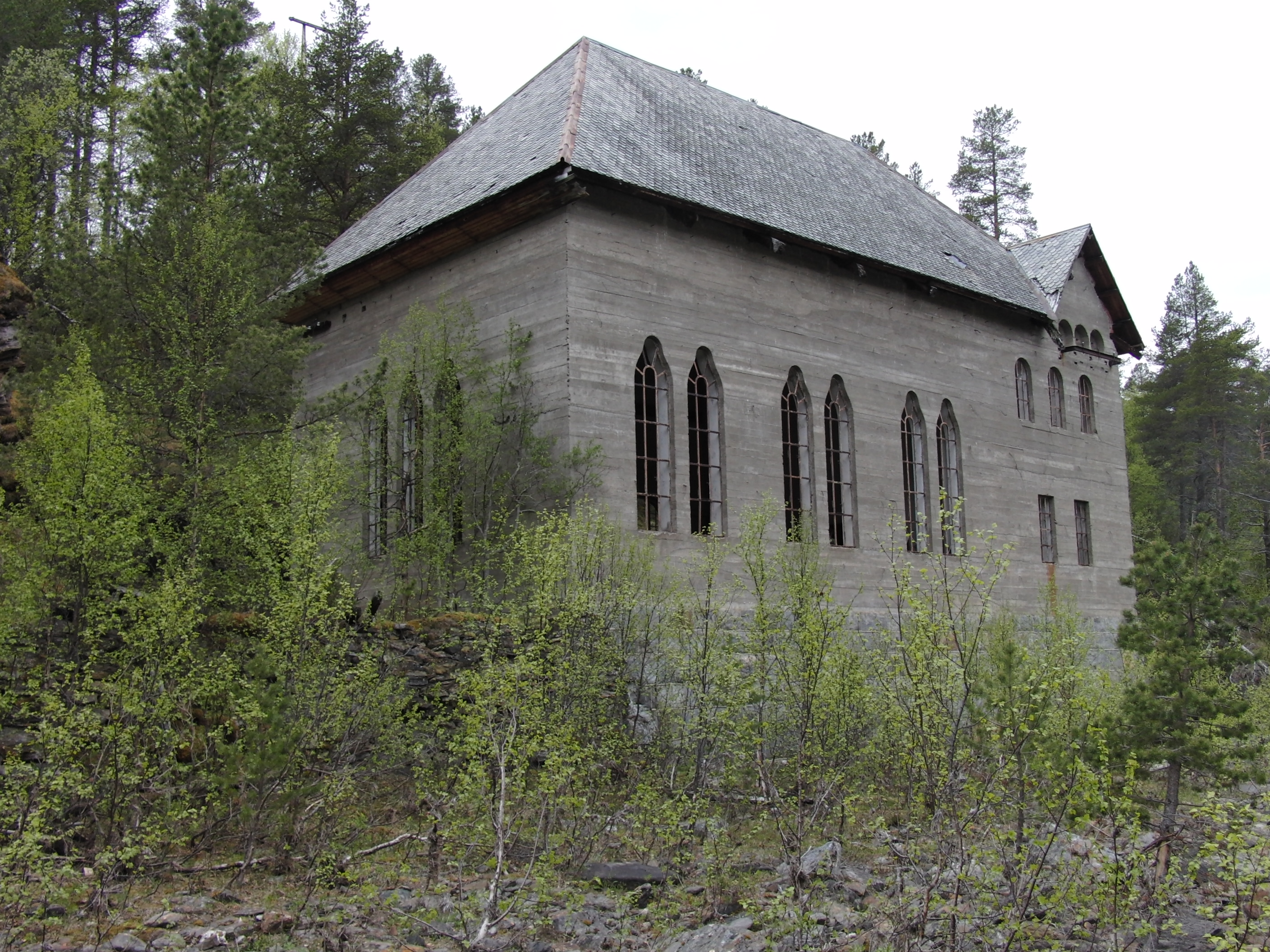
- Official name: Eidsfossen kraftverk
- Country: Norway
- Location: Tynset Municipality, Innlandet
- Coordinates: 62°31′17″N 10°22′42″E
- Status: Decommissioned
- Commission date: 1917
- Decommission date: 1999
- Owner: Kraftverkene i Orkla

Tidal power station
- Tidal range: 48 m (157 ft)

Power generation
- Nameplate capacity: 0.7 MW

The Eidsfossen Hydroelectric Power Station (or Eidsfossen kraftstasjon) is a decommissioned hydroelectric power station in Tynset Municipality in Innlandet county, Norway.

The power station is located in the Kvikne Forest (Kvikneskogen), near Kvikne. It utilized a drop of 48 meters (157 ft) on the Orkla River. The power plant was built to supply electricity to the Røstvangen Mines and built from 1915 to 1917, when it became operational. The plant was decommissioned in 1999.

An information sign about the power plant has been set up at a rest area along Norwegian National Road 3, and the old dam construction for the plant can be seen from the same route 5 kilometers (3.1 mi) south of Yset.
