= Innerdalsvatnet =

Lake in Innlandet, Norway

- Interactive map of the lake
- Location: Tynset Municipality, Innlandet
- Coordinates: 62.58512°N 10.1271°E
- Basin countries: Norway
- Max. length: 8.5 kilometres (5.3 mi)
- Max. width: 1 kilometre (0.62 mi)
- Surface area: 5.88 km^{2} (2.27 sq mi)
- Water volume: 153,000,000 m^{3} (5.4×10^{9} cu ft)
- Shore length^{1}: 19.94 kilometres (12.39 mi)
- Surface elevation: 813 metres (2,667 ft)
- References: NVE
- ^{1} Shore length is not a well-defined measure.

Innerdalsvatnet is a lake in Tynset Municipality in Innlandet county, Norway. It is a significant part of the Orkla watershed. The 5.88-square-kilometre (2.27 sq mi) lake lies about 10 kilometres (6.2 mi) west of the village of Kvikne. The northwest end of the lake has a large dam on it to control the level of the water for hydropower. The dam is actually located on the municipal and county border. The lake holds about 150,000,000 cubic metres (4.0×10^{10} US gal) of water which is run through a long tunnel to two nearby power stations.

== See also ==
- List of lakes in Norway
