= Ya (river) =

River in Innlandet, Norway

Location
- Country: Norway
- County: Innlandet
- Municipalities: Tynset Municipality

Physical characteristics
- Source: Nordya, Storya
  - location: North of Grøntjørnan, Tynset, Innlandet, Norway
  - coordinates: 62°36′23″N 10°36′37″E
  - elevation: 895 metres (2,936 ft)
- Mouth: Orkla River
  - location: Yset, Innlandet, Norway
  - coordinates: 62°33′53″N 10°18′44″E
  - elevation: 510 metres (1,670 ft)
- Length: 38 km (24 mi)
- Basin size: 285 km^{2} (110 sq mi)
- Discharge
  - average: 6 m^{3}/s (210 cu ft/s)

The Ya is a 38-kilometer (24 mi) river in Tynset Municipality in Innlandet county, Norway.

The river starts as the confluence of the Nordya (lit. 'North Ya') and Storya (lit. 'Big Ya') north of the Grøntjørnan farm. The Midtya (lit. 'Middle Ya') is a higher tributary of the Nordya. The largest source of the Ya is Falningsjøen (lit. 'Lake Falning', elevation 850 meters or 2,790 feet) via the Falninga river tributary; the lake is used as a reservoir for the Ulset Hydroelectric Power Station.

The river is a right tributary of the Orkla River, which it flows into from the east with its mouth at Yset near Norwegian National Road 3. Together with its tributaries, the Ya has a drainage area of 285 square kilometers (110 sq mi). The Ya river system runs through Forollhogna National Park and the Grøntjønnan Nature Reserve.
