= Telneset =

Village in Tynset Municipality, Norway

- Village
- Interactive map of Telneset
- Location within Innlandet Location within Norway
- Coordinates: 62.34316°N 10.89067°E
- Country: Norway
- Region: Eastern Norway
- County: Innlandet
- District: Østerdalen
- Municipality: Tynset Municipality
- Elevation: 490 m (1,610 ft)
- Time zone: UTC+01:00 (CET)
  - Summer (DST): UTC+02:00 (CEST)
- Post Code: 2500 Tynset

Telneset is a village in Tynset Municipality in Innlandet county, Norway. The village is located along the river Glåma, about halfway between the town of Tynset and the village of Tolga. The village lies in Tynset Municipality, but it is right on the border with neighboring Tolga Municipality.

In 2018, there was a join NATO military exercise in Telneset.
