= Fåset =

Village in Tynset Municipality, Norway

- Village
- Interactive map of Fåset
- Location within Innlandet Location within Norway
- Coordinates: 62.25954°N 10.66927°E
- Country: Norway
- Region: Eastern Norway
- County: Innlandet
- District: Østerdalen
- Municipality: Tynset Municipality
- Elevation: 481 m (1,578 ft)
- Time zone: UTC+01:00 (CET)
  - Summer (DST): UTC+02:00 (CEST)
- Post Code: 2500 Tynset

Fåset is a village in Tynset Municipality in Innlandet county, Norway. The village is located at the southern end of the Fådalen valley, where the river Fåa meets the larger river Glåma. The Norwegian National Road 3 runs through the village.
