= Falningsjøen =

Lake in Innlandet, Norway

- Interactive map of the lake
- Location: Tynset Municipality, Innlandet
- Coordinates: 62.60795°N 10.4136°E
- Basin countries: Norway
- Max. length: 3.2 kilometres (2.0 mi)
- Max. width: 2.4 kilometres (1.5 mi)
- Surface area: 2.43 km^{2} (0.94 sq mi)
- Shore length^{1}: 7.14 kilometres (4.44 mi)
- Surface elevation: 850 metres (2,790 ft)
- References: NVE
- ^{1} Shore length is not a well-defined measure.

Falningsjøen is a lake in Tynset Municipality in Innlandet county, Norway. The lake lies about 4.5 kilometres (2.8 mi) northeast of the village of Kvikne. The Ya River begins at this lake. The Forollhogna National Park boundary lies at the north end of the lake.

The south end of the lake has a dam to control the water for hydro-electric power.

== See also ==
- List of lakes in Norway
