= Tronfjell =

Mountain in Norway

Tron Tronfjell
- Tronden
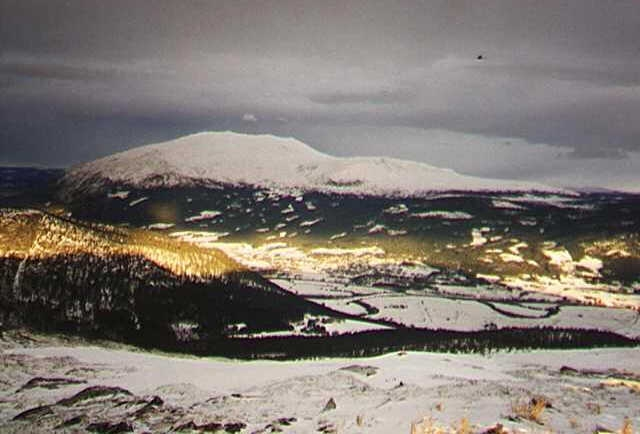
- Tronfjell with Alvdal in front.

Highest point
- Elevation: 1,665 m (5,463 ft)
- Prominence: 1,005 m (3,297 ft)
- Isolation: 29.5 km (18.3 mi)
- Coordinates: 62°10′28″N 10°41′41″E

Geography
- Interactive map of the mountain
- Location: Innlandet, Norway

Climbing
- Easiest route: Road

Tron or Tronfjell is a prominent mountain in Innlandet county, Norway. The 1,665-metre (5,463 ft) tall mountain lies on the border of Alvdal Municipality and Tynset Municipality, but the peak lies entirely in Alvdal Municipality. The mountain lies just to the northeast of the village of Alvdal and just northwest of the village of Tylldalen.

There is a toll road to the summit that is open in the summers. The road was built while installing a broadcasting antenna in the 1960s, being Norway's second highest road.

The Indian philosopher Swami Sri Ananda Acharya (1883-1945) lived on the mountain for large periods of his life.

== Etymology ==
The name Tron is the finite form of the word trond (Old Norse: þróndr) which means 'hog' (it is common in Norway to compare the shape of a mountain with an animal).

== See also ==
- List of mountains of Norway
- Trondenes
