= Tynset (town) =

Town in Innlandet, Norway

- Town/City
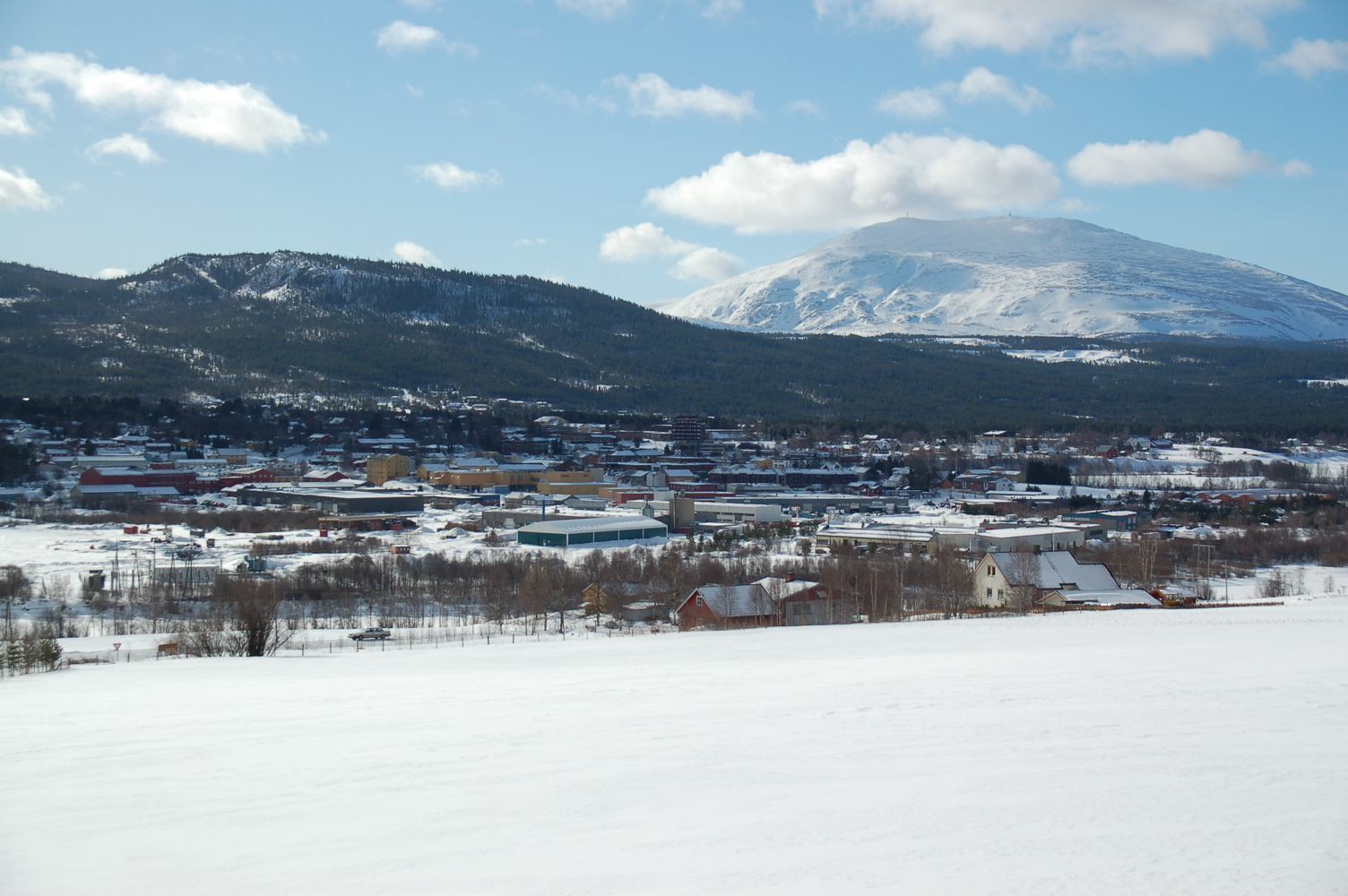
- View of the town
- Interactive map of Tynset
- Location within Innlandet Location within Norway
- Coordinates: 62.27594°N 10.78239°E
- Country: Norway
- Region: Eastern Norway
- County: Innlandet
- District: Østerdalen
- Municipality: Tynset Municipality
- Established as
- Town (By): 2020

Area
  - Total: 3.03 km^{2} (1.17 sq mi)
- Elevation: 493 m (1,617 ft)

Population (2024)
  - Total: 2,976
  - Density: 982/km^{2} (2,540/sq mi)
- Demonym: Tynseting
- Time zone: UTC+01:00 (CET)
  - Summer (DST): UTC+02:00 (CEST)
- Post Code: 2500 Tynset

Tynset is a town in Tynset Municipality in Innlandet county, Norway. The town is also the administrative centre of Tynset Municipality. Tynset Church is located in the town.

The town is located along the river Glåma, about halfway between the villages of Tolga and Alvdal. The town includes a central urban area with several surrounding residential areas. The smaller villages of Fåset (to the southwest) and Telneset (to the northeast) lie a short distance away from Tynset.

The 3.03-square-kilometre (750-acre) town has a population (2024) of 2,976 and a population density of 982 inhabitants per square kilometre (2,540/sq mi).

The municipal council of Tynset Municipality voted to designate the village of Tynset as a town on 26 August 2020.

== See also ==
- List of towns and cities in Norway
