= Holmboe (family) =

Norwegian family

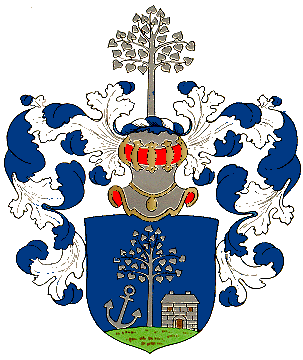
Modern drawing of Family coat of arms which originated in the 1700s

Holmboe is a Norwegian family which originated at Hirsholmene in Jutland, Denmark. It was introduced into Norway with the arrival of brothers Jens Olsøn Holmboe (1671–1743) and Hans Olsøn Holmboe (1685–1762). Jens Olsen Holmboe was a senior priest who arrived at Vardal during 1705. Hans Olsen Holmboe was a senior military officer who came to Norway during 1716.

== Family tree ==
The family trees are not meant to be complete. It lists only the notable individuals of this family, as well as their ancestors.

=== Jens Holmboe line ===
Below is a family tree that branches off from ancestor Jens Holmboe, bailiff (fogd) in Senja and Troms.

Jens (1752–1804)
Michael (1791–1863) | Even (1792–1859) | Hans (1798–1868) | Leonhard (1802–1887) | Joachim (1796–1876)
Conrad (1828–1923) | Jens (1821–1891) | Othar (1834–1919) | Karen (1826–1865) | Jens Anton (1828–1892) | Johannes (1844–1918) | Anna (1825–1907)
Johan Henrik (1863–1933) | Michael (1852–1918) | Thorolf (1866–1935) | Svend V. (1852–1923) | Elisa (1865–1926) | Carl (1882–1960) | Cornelius (1881–1947) | Joakim (1851–1929) | Anton J. R. (1856–1922)
Jens (1880–1943) | Thorolf (1888–1973) | Groven family | Jonas A. (1884–1964) | Gustaf A. (1857–1917) | Alf (1894–1969) | Anton R. (1902–1989)
Adler (1923–2014) | Tone (1930–2020) | Joachim R. (1919–2018) | Erling R. (1923–2008)

=== Otto Holmboe line ===
Below is a family tree that branches off from ancestor Otto Holmboe, provost (stiftsprost) at Christiania.

Otto (1710–1773)
Jens (1746–1823)
Bernt (1795–1850) | Christopher (1796–1882)

In addition, Arnold Holmboe (1873–1956) was a great-great-grandchild of Otto's first cousin.

== Literature ==
- Hans Cappelen: Norske Slektsvåpen (Norwegian Family Coats of Arms) with an English Summary, Oslo 1969, p. 128
