= Holmboe =

Holmboe is a Scandinavian surname. Notable people with the surname include:

== Norwegian family ==
- Jens Holmboe (bailiff) (1752–1804), Norwegian bailiff
- Even Hammer Holmboe (1792–1859), Norwegian politician, child of Jens Holmboe
- Hans Holmboe (1798–1868), Norwegian educator and politician, child of Jens Holmboe
- Leonhard Christian Borchgrevink Holmboe (1802–1887), Norwegian priest and politician, child of Jens Holmboe
- Jens Holmboe (politician) (1821–1891), Norwegian politician, grandchild of Jens Holmboe
- Conrad Holmboe (1828–1923), Norwegian businessman, grandchild of Jens Holmboe
- Johan Henrik Rye Holmboe (1863–1933), Norwegian politician, great-grandchild of Jens Holmboe
- Thorolf Holmboe (1866–1935), Norwegian painter, great-grandchild of Jens Holmboe
- Jens Holmboe (botanist) (1880–1943), Norwegian botanist, professor and author, great-grandchild of Jens Holmboe
- Cornelius Holmboe (1881–1947), Norwegian politician, great-grandchild of Jens Holmboe
- Carl Fredrik Holmboe (1882-1960), Norwegian engineer, great-grandchild of Jens Holmboe
- Joachim Holmboe Rønneberg (born 1919), Norwegian resistance fighter and broadcaster, great-great-great-grandchild of Jens Holmboe
- Tone Groven Holmboe (born 1930), Norwegian composer, married a great-great-great-grandchild of Jens Holmboe
- Bernt Michael Holmboe (1795–1850), Norwegian mathematician, grandchild of Otto Holmboe, brother of C.A.
- Christopher Andreas Holmboe (1796–1882), Norwegian philologist, grandchild of Otto Holmboe, brother of B.M.
- Arnold Holmboe (1873–1956), Norwegian politician, great-great-grandchild of Otto's first cousin
- Jørgen Holmboe (1902–1979), Norwegian-American meteorologist, great-grandson of Leonhard Christian Borchgrevink Holmboe

== Other ==
- Knud Holmboe (1902–1931), Danish journalist and explorer
- Vagn Holmboe (1909–1996), Danish composer
