= Kvikne =

Kvikne may refer to:

== Places ==
- Kvikne (village) (or Yset), a village within Tynset Municipality in Innlandet county, Norway
- Kvikne Municipality, a former municipality in the old Hedmark county, Norway
- Kvikne Church (Tynset), a church in Tynset Municipality in Innlandet county, Norway
- Kvikne Church (Nord-Fron), a church in Nord-Fron Municipality in Innlandet county, Norway
- Kvikne Copper Works, a former copper mine located in Tynset Municipality in Innlandet county, Norway

== People ==
- Per Áki Sigurdsson Kvikne (also known as Kjartan Lauritzen; born 1995), a Norwegian musician

== See also ==
- Kviknes Hotel
