= Svend Borchmann Hersleb Vogt =

Norwegian jurist and politician

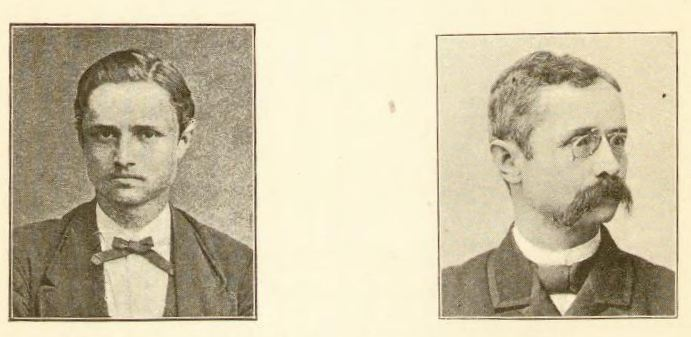
Svend Vogt

Svend Borchmann Hersleb Vogt (10 February 1852 – 4 February 1923) was a Norwegian jurist and politician for the Conservative Party.

He was born in Kristiania as the son of Nils Lorentz Vogt and his wife Karen Johanne Holmboe. His maternal grandfather was Hans Holmboe. He was a grandnephew of Even Hammer Holmboe and Leonhard Christian Borchgrevink Holmboe, and nephew of Jens and Hans Conrad Holmboe. He was named for professor of theology Svend Borchmann Hersleb.

He finished his secondary education in Kristianssand in 1869 and graduated as cand.jur. in 1873. He worked as a law clerk for the district stipendiary magistrate of Nordmøre from 1874, and was hired as a lawyer in 1876. In 1882 he started his own law firm, and gained access to Supreme Court cases. He was a presiding judge in Borgarting from 1902, having held the position on a non-permanent basis since 1895. Parallel to this he had worked in the Office of the Auditor General of Norway. From 1898 to 1923, the year of his death, he chaired this office as Auditor General of Norway.

He was a member of Kristiania city council for an unknown period. He served as a deputy representative to the Norwegian Parliament during the terms 1892–1894 and 1904–1906, representing the constituency of Kristiania, Hønefoss og Kongsvinger. From 1904 to 1905 he met as a regular representative, covering for Francis Hagerup who was Prime Minister. Vogt was also a member of public committees, including a "Commission on treatment of dangerous lunatics". Svend Borchman Hersleb Vogt had several children.

Civic offices
Preceded by Hagbard Berner	Auditor General of Norway; 1898–1923	Succeeded by Tore Embretsen Aaen
