= Jens Holmboe =

Jens Holmboe may refer to:

- Jens Holmboe (bailiff) (1752–1804), Norwegian bailiff
- Jens Holmboe (politician) (1821–1891), Norwegian politician
- Jens Holmboe (botanist) (1880–1943), Norwegian botanist
