= Johan Henrik Rye Holmboe =

Norwegian politician

Minister of Trade
- In office 6 March 1923 – 25 July 1924
- Prime Minister: Otto B. Halvorsen; Abraham Berge
- Preceded by: Lars Oftedal
- Succeeded by: Lars O. Meling

Minister of Provisioning
- In office 21 June 1920 – 22 June 1921
- Prime Minister: Otto B. Halvorsen
- Preceded by: Håkon Five
- Succeeded by: Rasmus Mortensen

Member of the Norwegian Parliament
- In office 1 January 1919 – 31 December 1927
- Constituency: Market towns of Nordland, Troms and Finnmark (1922–1927); Tromsø (1919–1921)

Personal details
- Born: 28 November 1863 Tromsø, Troms, Sweden-Norway
- Died: 29 May 1933 (aged 69) Tromsø, Troms, Norway
- Party: Free-minded Liberal
- Spouse: Adolfa Holmboe (m. 1893)
- Children: 6

Johan Henrik Rye Holmboe (28 November 1863 – 29 May 1933) was a Norwegian businessperson and politician for the Free-minded Liberal Party. He was a city council member in Tromsø for 42 years, a three-term member of Parliament, Minister of Provisioning from 1920 to 1921, and Minister of Trade from 1923 to 1924.

== Personal life ==
He was born in Tromsø as the son of businessman Hans Conrad Holmboe (1828–1923) and his wife Jakobine Henrikke ("Rikka") Harris (1835–1913). He had several brothers and sisters. Johan Henrik Rye Holmboe was named after his maternal great-grandfather, politician Johan Henrik Rye. His paternal granduncles Even, Hans and Leonhard were involved in politics too, so were his paternal uncle Jens Holmboe and maternal grandfather Anton Theodor Harris. His cousin Thorolf Holmboe was a painter.

In 1893 he married Johanne Adolfa Holmboe, who hailed from Ålesund. Her paternal grandfather being Leonhard Christian Borchgrevink Holmboe; she was a cousin of Johan Henrik Rye Holmboe. The couple had several sons and daughters, who wrote their last names with a hyphen; Rye-Holmboe.

== Career ==
Johan Henrik Rye Holmboe started his career working in his father's company. In 1888 he established a barrel factory of his own, followed by a factory for cod liver oil and herring meal in 1907. He was also involved in shipping, and was vice consul for the United Kingdom from 1908 to 1916. He was also involved in organizational life, chairing both the Tromsø Fishers' Association, the Tromsø Commercial Association and the Federation of North Norwegian Commercial Associations. In local politics, he was a member of Tromsø city council from 1889 to 1931, mostly serving in the executive committee.

He was elected to the Norwegian Parliament in 1919, representing the constituency of Tromsø. From June 1920 to June 1921 he was Minister of Provisioning in the first cabinet Bahr Halvorsen. During this period his seat in parliament was taken by Thorvald Bernhard Moe.

Holmboe was elected again in 1922, representing the Market towns of Nordland, Troms and Finnmark. In March 1923 he was appointed Minister of Trade, Shipping, Industry, Craft and Fisheries in the second cabinet Bahr Halvorsen. However, Prime Minister Otto Bahr Halvorsen died already in May the same year. The cabinet was dissolved, but Holmboe retained his position in the cabinet Berge, which left office in July 1924. During this period his seat in parliament had been filled by Anders Pedersen Brandt. In 1926, Abraham Berge and six of his former cabinet members, including Holmboe, were tried for impeachment—but found not guilty. At that time, Holmboe was President of the Lagting, having been elected in 1925 to serve one final term in parliament. However, since the President of the Lagting is a member of the Constitutional Court of the Realm that handles impeachment cases, the position went to Nils Erik Flakstad.

Johan Henrik Rye Holmboe died in 1933 in Tromsø.

Political offices
| Preceded by Haakon Martin Five | Norwegian Minister of Provisioning; 1920–1921 | Succeeded by Ole Monsen Mjelde |
| Preceded by Lars Oftedal | Norwegian Minister of Trade; 1923–1924 | Succeeded by Lars Olai Meling |
