= Thorolf Holmboe =

Norwegian painter, illustrator and designer (1866–1935)

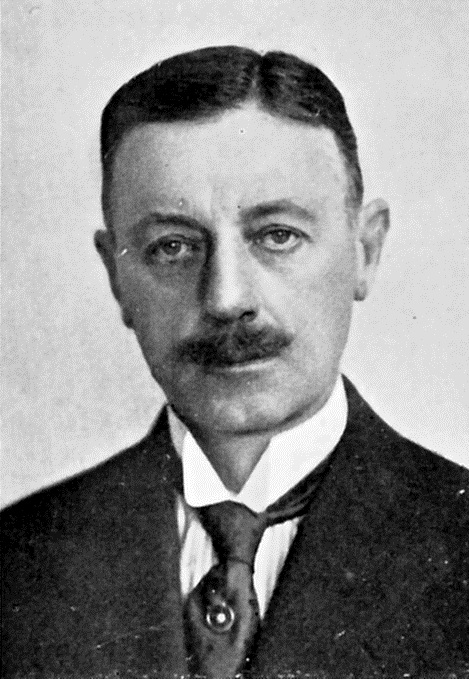
Thorolf Holmboe (date unknown)

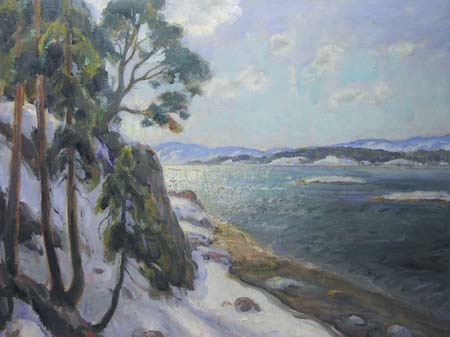
Frognerkilen Bay

Thorolf Holmboe (10 May 1866 – 8 March 1935) was a Norwegian painter, illustrator and designer.

== Biography ==
He was born in Vefsn Municipality in Nordland county, Norway, as the oldest son of Othar Ervigius Holmboe and his wife Sofie Birgitte Andrea Hall. He had one brother, Othar, who also became a painter. His grandfather was Michael Wide Holmboe, son of bailiff Jens Holmboe and brother of politicians Even, Leonhard and Hans Holmboe. In addition, he was the nephew of Jens Holmboe, cousin of Johan Henrik Rye Holmboe, and brother-in-law of Jappe Nilssen.

He studied under Hans Gude in Berlin between 1886 and 1887 and Fernand Cormon in Paris between 1889 and 1891. He was inspired by many different styles at different points in his career, including Naturalism, Neo-romanticism, Realism and Impressionism. He is represented with thirteen works in the National Gallery of Norway.

Thorolf Holmboe was appointed a Knight of the 1st Class of Order of St. Olav in 1900. He was awarded the Petter Dass-medaljen by Nordlendingenes Forening in Oslo during the association's 50th anniversary in 1912. Nordlendingenes Forening is an association of former residents who had relocated from the counties of Nordland, Troms and Finnmark in Northern Norway.
