= Gustaf Aspelin =

Swedish-Norwegian mining engineer, entrepreneur, wholesaler and consul

Jonas Gustaf Samuel Aspelin (5 February 1857 – 8 May 1917) was a Swedish-Norwegian mining engineer, entrepreneur, wholesaler and consul.

== Personal life ==
Aspelin was born at Kristianstad in Skåne County, Sweden. He was a son of Jonas Aspelin (1811–82) and Catharina Charlotta Björklund (1817–91).

In 1883 he married Elisa Holmboe (1865–1926), a daughter of Jens Anton Holmboe (1828–92) and Karen Dorothea Biørn (1830–70). His wife was a granddaughter of Leonhard Christian Borchgrevink Holmboe, half-sister of Carl Fredrik Holmboe and first cousin of Cornelius Holmboe. The couple had the son Jonas Aspelin, who at Gustaf's death took over the family company, later with another son Knut as partner. Their daughter Karen married Ragnar Sommar Bruzelius(1869-1956), mayor of Kristianstad.

== Career ==
Aspelin attended school in Filipstad (Filipstads Bergskola) from 1876 to 1877. From 1878 he worked as an engineer at Lesjöfors (Lesjöfors Bruk) in Värmland, Sweden, and represented the company in Christiania (now Oslo) from 1881. After settling in Christiania he founded a trade company which came to be one of Norway's largest companies in the construction business. The business included sales of wire, spades, shovels and hand tools. The company imported iron and steel products from Swedish producers. The company he founded merged with Stormbull AS in 1978 to form Aspelin-Stormbull AS, now Aspelin Ramm Gruppen AS.

Aspelin obtained Norwegian citizenship in 1888. In 1907 he became the first Swedish consul in Christiania, and was appointed Consul General from 1911. Aspelin was a co-founder and chairman of the Swedish-American society, Svenska Sällskapet. He was also the first chairman of the board of the Swedish church society, Svenska Kyrkoföreningen. He was a member of the Freemasons (Den Norske Frimurerorden). He was decorated as a Knight, First Class of the Order of Vasa and a Knight of the Order of the Polar Star.
