= Torbjørn Gaarder =

Norwegian chemist

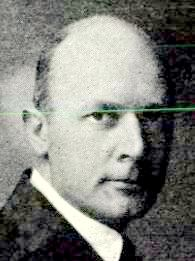
Torbjørn Gaarder

Torbjørn Gaarder (1885–1970) was a Norwegian chemist. He has been called "a pioneer of biochemistry in Norway".

He was born in Kristiania, took the dr.philos. degree and studied biochemistry and physiology in Copenhagen and the United States. He was appointed professor at Bergen Museum in 1931, and served at the University of Bergen from 1948 to 1955. He was also editor-in-chief of the periodical Naturen between 1925 and 1946, succeeding Jens Holmboe.
