= Jonas Aspelin =

Norwegian businessman

Jonas Aspelin (8 September 1884 – 3 September 1964) was a Norwegian businessperson.

He was born in Kristiania as a son of Gustaf Aspelin (1857–1917) and Elisa Holmboe (1865–1926). He was thus a maternal great-grandson of Leonhard Christian Borchgrevink Holmboe and nephew of Carl Fredrik Holmboe. His sister Karen married Ragnar Sommar Bruzelius, mayor of Gustaf's city of origin Kristianstad.

Jonas Aspelin attended commerce school, and spent about five years abroad in Germany, England and the United States. His father had founded an eponymous company for wholesale of metals in 1881. Gustaf Aspelin died in 1917, and Jonas took over, and later took his brother Knut on board as co-owner. He was also a deputy chair of the employers' association Jerngrossistenes Forening and supervisory council member of Storebrand.

He was appointed Swedish consul to Norway in 1924, and promoted to consul-general in 1929. He served in this capacity for about thirty years. He also chaired the friendship society Swedish Society, which had been co-founded and chaired by his father.

Early in his career he was decorated as a Commander of the Order of Vasa and a Knight of the Order of the Polar Star. In 1952 he became a Knight, First Class of the Order of St. Olav. He died in September 1964 and was buried in Ris.
