= Naturen =

Norwegian popular science magazine

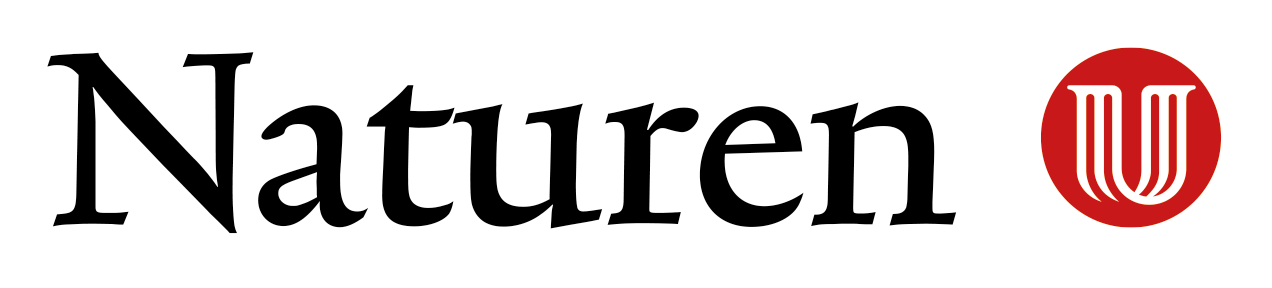
- Categories: Popular science magazine
- Frequency: Monthly
- Founder: Hans Reusch
- Founded: 1877; 149 years ago
- Country: Norway
- Based in: Bergen
- Language: Norwegian
- ISSN: 0028-0887
- OCLC: 1607905

Naturen (English: Nature) is a Norwegian popular science magazine, which has been published since 1877 in Bergen, Norway. It is the earliest still running popular science magazine of the country.

== History and profile ==
Naturen was started by the geologist Hans Reusch in Bergen in 1877. It was subtitled Et illustreret Maanedsskrift for popular Naturvidenskab (An Illustrated Monthly for Popular Natural Sciences). It is connected to the University of Bergen. It has a popular science approach to the natural sciences, including medicine.

Naturen was edited by its founder, Hans Reusch, for the first four years. Among its former editors are Jens Holmboe (1906–1925), Torbjørn Gaarder (1925–1946) and Knut Fægri (1947–1977), and Per Magnus Jørgensen (1991–1997).
