= Conrad Holmboe =

Norwegian businessman (1828–1923)

Conrad Holmboe (19 September 1828 – 30 June 1923) was a Norwegian businessperson.

== Personal life ==
He was born in Tromsøe as the son of Michael Wide Holmboe (1791–1863) and his wife Anna Rasch Schjelderup (1794–1878). He had several brothers and sisters. His grandfather Jens Holmboe was a bailiff, and his uncles Even, Hans and Leonhard were involved in politics, so were his brother Jens Holmboe and grandnephew Anton Johan Rønneberg.

In 1828, he married Jakobine Henrikke Harris from Tromsøe. The couple had seven sons and two daughters. Jakobine was a daughter of Anthon Theodor Harris, and their son Johan Henrik Rye Holmboe became a notable politician. He was named for Jakobine's paternal grandfather Johan Henrik Rye.

== Career ==
Conrad Holmboe was a central person in the business life of Tromsø, one of the largest cities in Norway, for seventy years. He was hired in his father's company in 1846, and later became co-owner. At that time the company was named M. W. Holmboe & Søn. Following his father's death in 1863 he became the single owner. He was also vice consul for the Russian Empire.
