= Knut Fægri =

Norwegian botanist and palaeoecologist

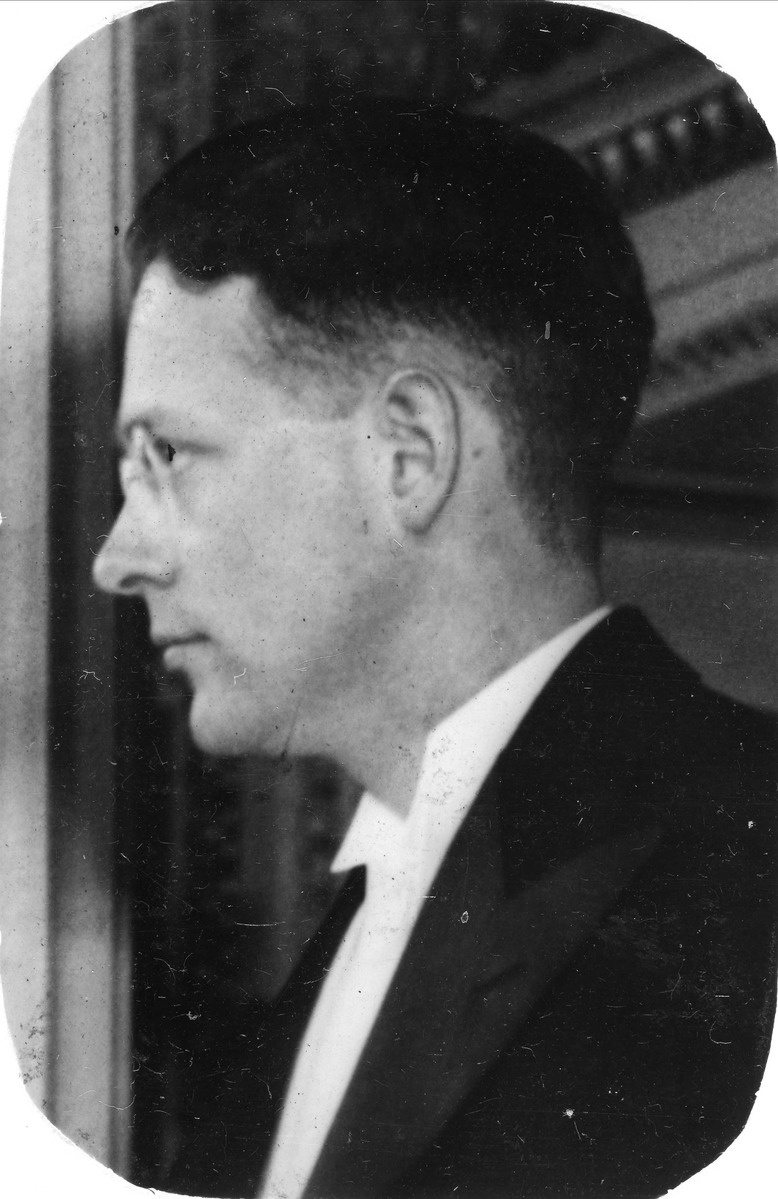
- Knut in the 1930s
- Born: 17 July 1909; Bergen, Hordaland
- Died: 10 December 2001 (aged 92); Bergen, Hordaland
- Spouse: Nancy Meyer
- Scientific career
- Fields: Botanist, palaeoecologist
- Workplaces: University of Bergen

Knut Fægri (17 July 1909 – 10 December 2001) was a Norwegian botanist and palaeoecologist.

Fægri was born in Bergen. He was the son of Major Ole A. Fægri (1875–1962) and Gudrun Stoltz (1881–1940) and the nephew of the botanist, natural scientist, and politician Jørgen Brunchorst (1862–1917).

== Academic career ==
Fægri received his examen artium at the Bergen Cathedral School in 1926 and received his doctorate in 1934 with the thesis Über die Längenvariationen einiger Gletscher des Jostedalsbre und die dadurch bedingten Pflanzensukzessionen. He was hired as a research fellow at the Chr. Michelsen Institute, was appointed professor at Bergen Museum in 1946 and from 1948 jointly at the museum and the University of Bergen. He retired in 1979. He was also editor-in-chief of the periodical Naturen between 1947 and 1977.

== Societal engagement ==
Fægri was much engaged in discussions of social issues of broad public interest. He was outspoken in his criticism of the negative effects of hydroelectric power development on nature and biodiversity. He often had controversial views. For example, in the 1960s he agitated for a liberal act on use of marijuana, which he saw as something the state should leave to the individual citizen to decide about. Privately, he was a proponent of naturism and he appeared naked in a discussion on that topic broadcast on Swedish television.

== Honours ==
Fægri was named an honorary doctor at Uppsala University in 1977, received the Millennium Botany Award in 1999, and was named Commander of the Order of St. Olav in 1979.

== Personal life ==
Fægri married the museum director Nancy Meyer (1912–2007) in 1941. Their son Knut Fægri Jr. became a chemistry professor.

== Selected bibliography ==
This is a list of Fægri's most notable works:

- Über die Längenvariationen einiger Gletscher des Jostedalsbre und die dadurch bedingten Pflanzensukzessionen (1934)
- Quartärgeologische Untersuchungen im westlichen Norwegen I-II (1935–40)
- Studies on the Pleistocene of Western Norway III-IV (1943–49)
- Text-Book of Modern Pollen Analysis (4 editions 1950–1989, with Johannes Iversen)
- Norges planter I (1958)
- Norges planter II 1960)
- The Distribution of Norwegian Vascular Plants: Coast Plants (1960)
- The Principles of Pollination Ecology (1966, with the Dutch botanist Leendert van der Pijl)
- Krydder (1966)
- Dikteren og hans blomster (1988)
