= Kvikne Municipality =

Former municipality in Hedmark, Norway

Kvikne Municipality Kvikne herred
- Former municipality
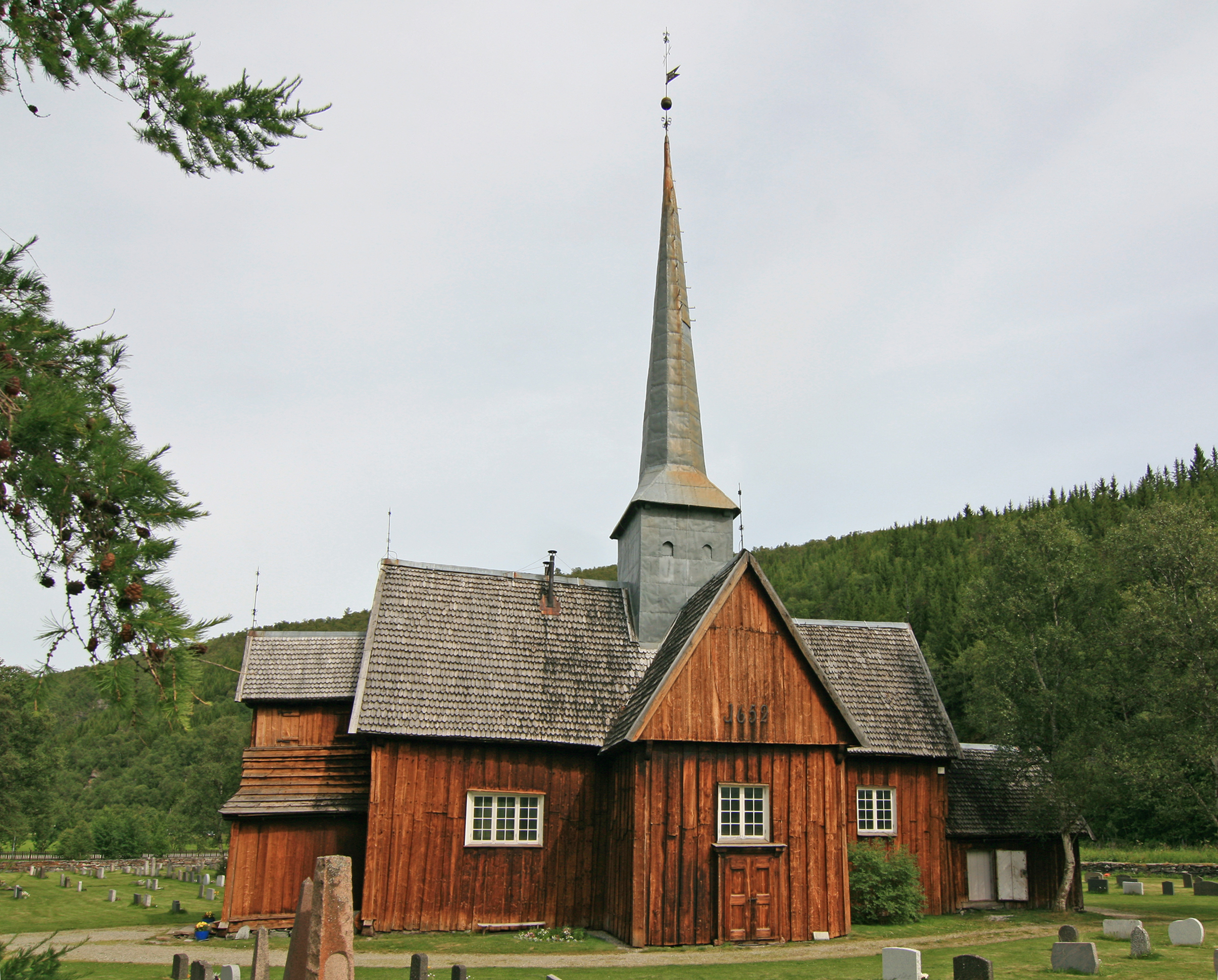
- View of the local Kvikne Church

- Hedmark within Norway

- Kvikne within Hedmark
- Coordinates: 62°34′56″N 10°17′14″E
- Country: Norway
- County: Hedmark
- District: Østerdalen
- Established: 1 Jan 1838
  - Created as: Formannskapsdistrikt
- Disestablished: 1 Jan 1966
  - Succeeded by: Tynset Municipality and Rennebu Municipality
- Administrative centre: Kvikne

Government
  - Mayor (1963–1965): Kåre Kleven (Sp)

Area (upon dissolution)
  - Total: 1,154 km^{2} (446 sq mi)
  - Rank: #85 in Norway
- Highest elevation: 1,524 m (5,000 ft)

Population (1965)
  - Total: 1,092
  - Rank: #422 in Norway
  - Density: 0.9/km^{2} (2.3/sq mi)
  - Change (10 years): ▼ −13.3%
- Demonym: Kviknedøl

Official language
  - Norwegian form: Neutral
- Time zone: UTC+01:00 (CET)
  - Summer (DST): UTC+02:00 (CEST)
- ISO 3166 code: NO-0440

Kvikne is a former municipality in the old Hedmark county, Norway. The 1,154-square-kilometre (446 sq mi) municipality existed from 1838 until its dissolution in 1966. The area is now divided between Tynset Municipality in Innlandet county and Rennebu Municipality in Trøndelag county. The area was one of the northernmost parts of the traditional district of Østerdalen. The administrative centre was the village of Kvikne where Kvikne Church is located.

Prior to its dissolution in 1966, the 1,154-square-kilometre (446 sq mi) municipality was the 85th largest by area out of the 466 municipalities in Norway. Kvikne Municipality was the 422nd most populous municipality in Norway with a population of about 1,092. The municipality's population density was 0.9 inhabitants per square kilometre (2.3/sq mi) and its population had decreased by 13.3% over the previous 10-year period.

Copper mining and soapstone quarries were historically significant industries in the municipality.

== General information ==
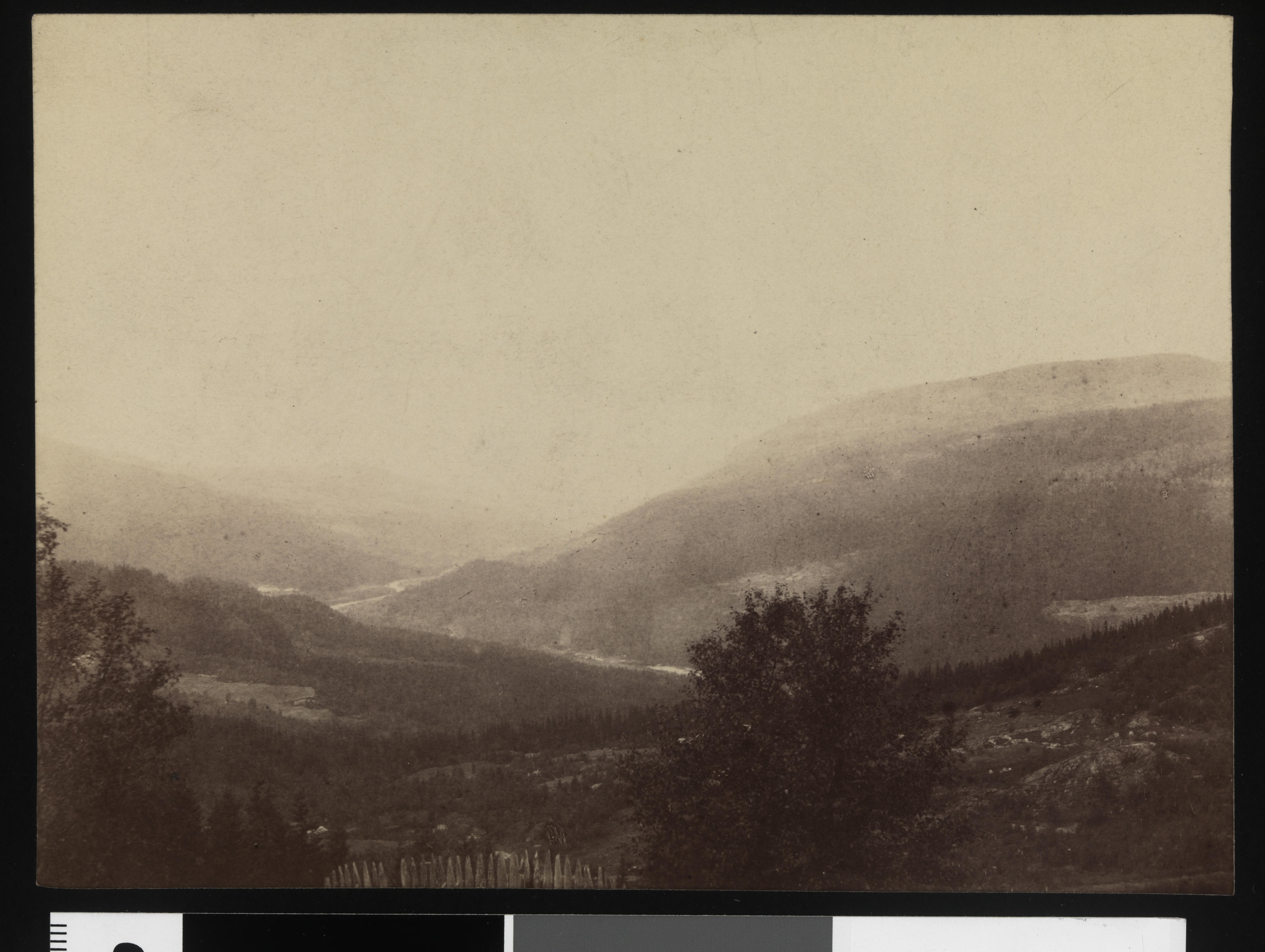
Historic photo of Bjørgan in Kvikne

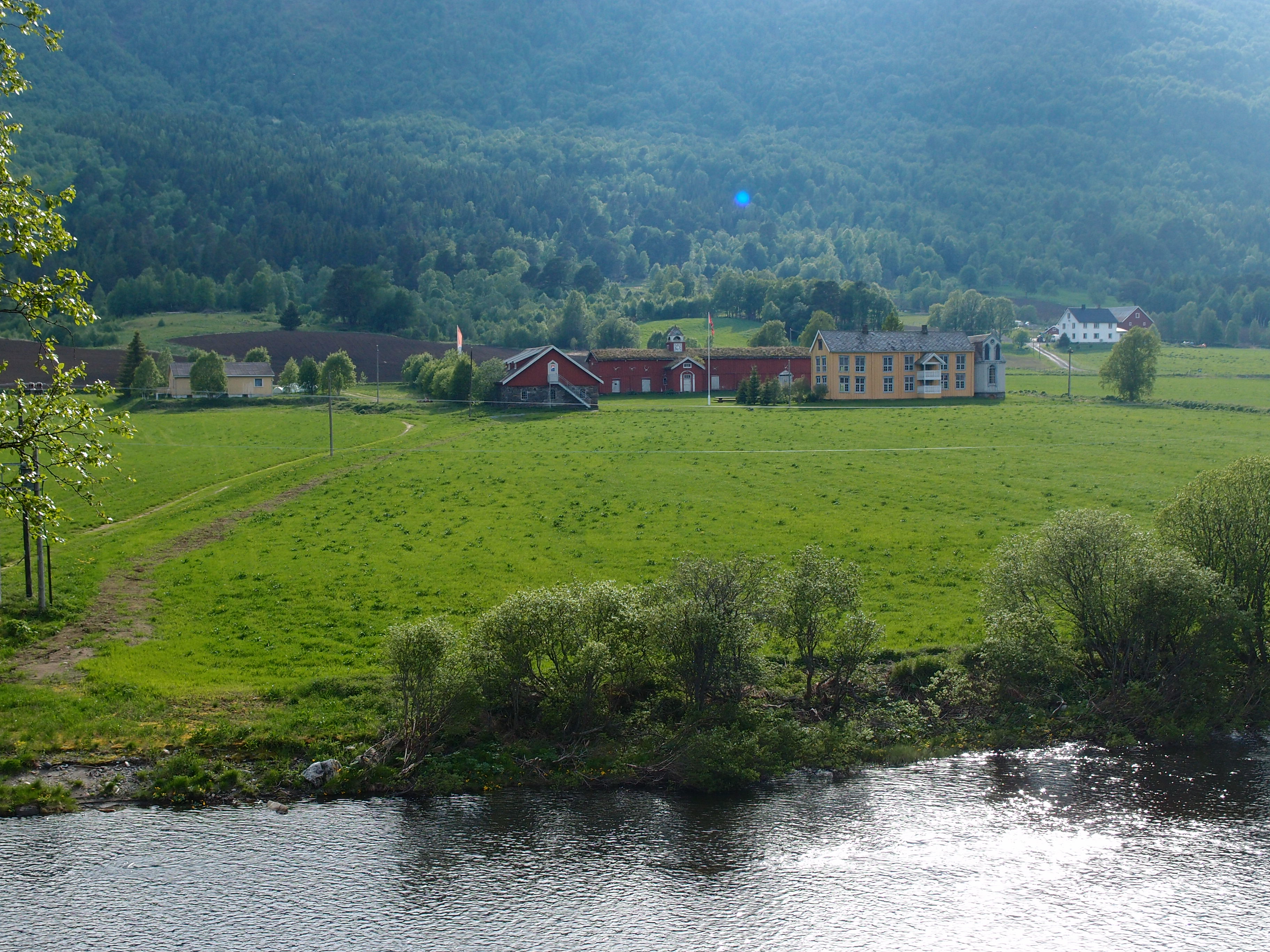
Vollan farm in Kvikne

Kvikne was established as a municipality on 1 January 1838 (see formannskapsdistrikt law). The borders never changed during the existence of the municipality, which is fairly unusual in Norway.

During the 1960s, there were many municipal mergers across Norway due to the work of the Schei Committee. Kvikne Municipality was dissolved on 1 January 1966 and its lands were divided between two neighboring municipalities. The 952-square-kilometre (368 sq mi) Kvikne parish in the south (population: 664) was merged into Tynset Municipality in Hedmark county and the 201-square-kilometre (78 sq mi) Innset parish in the north (population: 420) was incorporated into Rennebu Municipality in Sør-Trøndelag county. A few years later in 1970, the border was adjusted again with the Garlia farm (population: 5) being transferred from Tynset Municipality to Rennebu Municipality.

=== Name ===
The municipality (originally the parish) is named Kvikne (Old Norse: Kviknar) which is an old name for the area. The name probably comes from the word kvikr which means "alive" or "lively". The name may be referring to the quick clay in the area.

=== Churches ===
The Church of Norway had two parishes (sokn) within Kvikne Municipality. At the time of the municipal dissolution, it was part of the Kvikne prestegjeld and the Nord-Østerdal prosti (deanery) in the Diocese of Hamar.

Churches in Kvikne
Parish (sokn)	Church name	Location of the church	Year built
Kvikne	Kvikne Church	Kvikne	1654
Innset	Innset Church	Innset	1642 (rebuilt in 2000)

== Geography ==
The mountain municipality was located in the northernmost part of the old Hedmark county. Tolga-Os Municipality was located to the east, Tynset Municipality was located to the southeast, Folldal Municipality was located to the southwest, Oppdal Municipality was located to the west (in Sør-Trøndelag county), Rennebu Municipality was located to the northwest (in Sør-Trøndelag county), and Sokndal Municipality and Budal Municipality were located to the northeast (both in Sør-Trøndelag county). The highest point in the municipality was the 1,524-metre (5,000 ft) tall mountain Marsjøfjellet, located on the border with Folldal Municipality.

== Government ==
While it existed, Kvikne Municipality was responsible for primary education (through 10th grade), outpatient health services, senior citizen services, welfare and other social services, zoning, economic development, and municipal roads and utilities. The municipality was governed by a municipal council of directly elected representatives. The mayor was indirectly elected by a vote of the municipal council. The municipality was under the jurisdiction of the Eidsivating Court of Appeal.

=== Municipal council ===
The municipal council (Herredsstyre) of Kvikne was made up of 13 representatives that were elected to four year terms. The tables below show the historical composition of the council by political party.

Kvikne herredsstyre 1963–1965
Party name (in Norwegian)	Number of representatives
Labour Party (Arbeiderpartiet)	4
Centre Party (Senterpartiet)	7
Liberal Party (Venstre)	2
Total number of members:	13
Note: On 1 January 1966, Kvikne Municipality was divided between Tynset Municipality and Rennebu Municipality.

Kvikne herredsstyre 1959–1963
Party name (in Norwegian)	Number of representatives
Labour Party (Arbeiderpartiet)	4
Centre Party (Senterpartiet)	5
Liberal Party (Venstre)	4
Total number of members:	13

Kvikne herredsstyre 1955–1959
Party name (in Norwegian)	Number of representatives
Labour Party (Arbeiderpartiet)	4
Farmers' Party (Bondepartiet)	6
Liberal Party (Venstre)	3
Total number of members:	13

Kvikne herredsstyre 1951–1955
Party name (in Norwegian)	Number of representatives
Labour Party (Arbeiderpartiet)	5
Farmers' Party (Bondepartiet)	5
Liberal Party (Venstre)	2
Total number of members:	12

Kvikne herredsstyre 1947–1951
Party name (in Norwegian)	Number of representatives
Labour Party (Arbeiderpartiet)	3
Farmers' Party (Bondepartiet)	2
Liberal Party (Venstre)	2
Joint List(s) of Non-Socialist Parties (Borgerlige Felleslister)	3
Local List(s) (Lokale lister)	2
Total number of members:	12

Kvikne herredsstyre 1945–1947
Party name (in Norwegian)	Number of representatives
Labour Party (Arbeiderpartiet)	4
Christian Democratic Party (Kristelig Folkeparti)	3
Farmers' Party (Bondepartiet)	2
Joint List(s) of Non-Socialist Parties (Borgerlige Felleslister)	3
Total number of members:	12

Kvikne herredsstyre 1937–1941*
Party name (in Norwegian)	Number of representatives
Labour Party (Arbeiderpartiet)	2
Farmers' Party (Bondepartiet)	3
Liberal Party (Venstre)	3
Joint List(s) of Non-Socialist Parties (Borgerlige Felleslister)	4
Total number of members:	12
Note: Due to the German occupation of Norway during World War II, no elections were held for new municipal councils until after the war ended in 1945.

=== Mayors ===
The mayor (Norwegian: ordfører) of Kvikne Municipality was the political leader of the municipality and the chairperson of the municipal council. The following people have held this position:

- 1838–1843: Even Ulseth
- 1844–1847: Anders Rambeck-Knoff
- 1848–1851: Rev. Peter Lorentz de Ferry Smith
- 1852–1853: Ingebret Støen
- 1854–1857: E. Hansen
- 1858–1859: Ingebret Flotten
- 1860–1861: Halsten E. Ulseth
- 1862–1865: Ingebret Flotten
- 1866–1869: Rev. P.N. Schult
- 1870–1873: Anders Jørgensen Reitan
- 1874–1876: Halsten Ulseth
- 1877–1893: Hans Iversen Storeng
- 1894–1897: John Bobak
- 1898–1905: O. Hagen
- 1905–1908: John Bobak
- 1908–1911: Ole L. Næverdal (V)
- 1911–1913: K.H. Ulset
- 1914–1918: Johannes Grue (V)
- 1919–1922: H. Eithun (V)
- 1922–1931: Ole L. Næverdal (V)
- 1931–1934: Lars Kleven (V)
- 1931–1940: Kristian Heiberg-Gjerstad (Bp)
- 1940–1941: Lars Kleven (V)
- 1941–1942: John Dalsegg (NS)
- 1942–1944: Anders Trondshaug (NS)
- 1944–1945: Johan A. Storeng
- 1946–1947: Olav J. Ween (V)
- 1947–1951: Per Ås Grue (LL)
- 1951–1952: Sigurd Berg Heimer (Ap)
- 1952–1955: I.K. Flaten (Bp)
- 1955–1959: Karstein Grue (V)
- 1959–1963: Anders Ausberg (Sp)
- 1963–1965: Kåre Kleven (Sp)

== Climate ==
Climate data for Sæter, Kvikne 1961-1990, extremes 1933-1998
Month	Jan	Feb	Mar	Apr	May	Jun	Jul	Aug	Sep	Oct	Nov	Dec	Year
Record high °C (°F)	11.8 (53.2)	10.0 (50.0)	13.1 (55.6)	15.8 (60.4)	24.1 (75.4)	29.3 (84.7)	27.0 (80.6)	28.5 (83.3)	24.7 (76.5)	19.0 (66.2)	12.0 (53.6)	11.0 (51.8)	29.3 (84.7)
Mean daily maximum °C (°F)	−4.6 (23.7)	−3.6 (25.5)	0.1 (32.2)	4.1 (39.4)	11.0 (51.8)	15.4 (59.7)	16.5 (61.7)	15.6 (60.1)	10.8 (51.4)	6.0 (42.8)	−0.5 (31.1)	−3.0 (26.6)	5.6 (42.2)
Mean daily minimum °C (°F)	−12.8 (9.0)	−12.3 (9.9)	−9.1 (15.6)	−4.8 (23.4)	1.0 (33.8)	4.8 (40.6)	6.6 (43.9)	5.8 (42.4)	2.6 (36.7)	−0.8 (30.6)	−7.6 (18.3)	−11.2 (11.8)	−3.1 (26.3)
Record low °C (°F)	−38.4 (−37.1)	−36.8 (−34.2)	−34.1 (−29.4)	−26.6 (−15.9)	−13.5 (7.7)	−4.6 (23.7)	−1.8 (28.8)	−3.0 (26.6)	−8.5 (16.7)	−20.3 (−4.5)	−35.1 (−31.2)	−37.8 (−36.0)	−38.4 (−37.1)
Average precipitation mm (inches)	33 (1.3)	25 (1.0)	27 (1.1)	23 (0.9)	33 (1.3)	60 (2.4)	82 (3.2)	65 (2.6)	69 (2.7)	48 (1.9)	35 (1.4)	35 (1.4)	535 (21.2)
Average precipitation days	8.9	6.9	7.2	7.1	7.3	10.8	13.4	11.9	13.4	10.5	9.1	8.8	115.3
Source: Met Norway Eklima

== See also ==
- List of former municipalities of Norway
