= Storofsen flood =

July 1789 flood in Norway

Storofsen Flood
- Date: July 1789
- Location: Norway
- Deaths: 63

Storofsen – also referred to as Ofsen – was a flood disaster that struck eastern Norway in July 1789 during which 63 people vanished, thousands of houses were destroyed and thousands of livestock killed. The rivers Glomma and Gudbrandsdalslågen flooded their banks and the waters of Lake Mjøsa rose ten meters above their normal level.

The Kvikne Copper Works were significantly damaged by the flood, virtually ending the operation of the mine. A bailiff (fogd) in Senja and Tromsøe named Jens Holmboe organized settling in the Målselvdalen valley in what would later become Målselv Municipality and Bardu Municipality. Farmers from the Gudbrandsdalen and Østerdalen valleys who had been affected by the flood moved north between 1791 and 1800, with Holmboe helping about forty families with supplies and funding.
