= Bjørgan parsonage =

Museum and former parsonage in Kvikne, Norway

Coordinates: 62°34′27″N 10°18′51″E

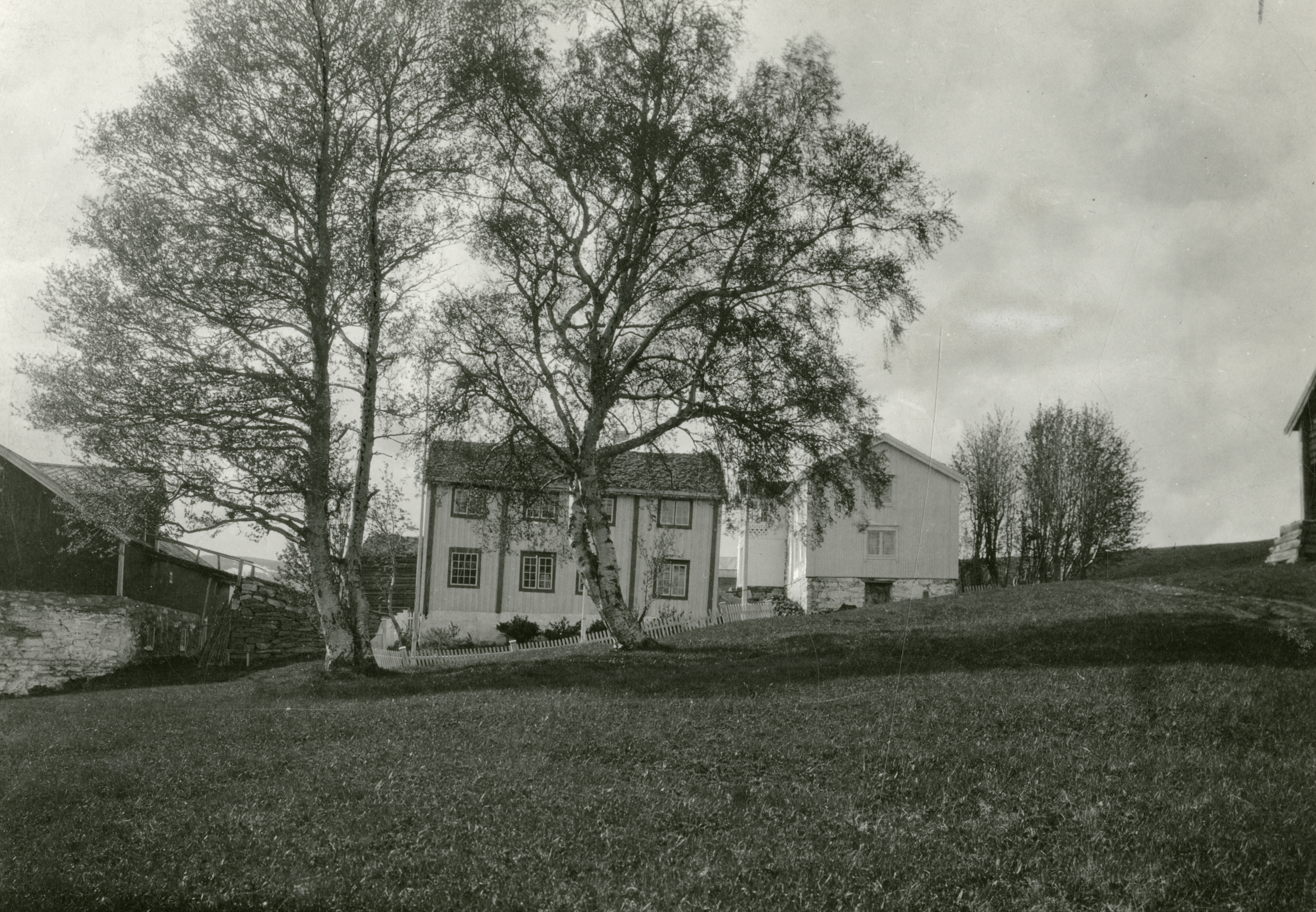
Photo from 1931

The Bjørgan parsonage (Norwegian: Bjørgan prestegård) is a museum and former parsonage for Kvikne Church in Kvikne in the northern part of Tynset Municipality in Innlandet county, Norway. It is where the writer Bjørnstjerne Bjørnson (1832–1910) was born and lived during his early childhood, from 1832 to 1837, while his father was the parish priest at Kvikne (1831–1837).

The house was built in 1780 and it was used as a parsonage until 1860. In 1917, the teacher Tilla Valstad discovered that the main building was going to be demolished. She started a collection with the goal of making the place into a museum for Bjørnson, and in 1919 the farm was transferred to the state as a gift. In 1932, a memorial to Bjørnson was unveiled at Bjørgan, and the old building contains many items from Bjørnson's time. Until 2006, the museum was part of the Sandvig Collections at Maihaugen, which is also responsible for the Aulestad farm and museum. The Bjørgan parsonage is now part of the North Østerdalen Museum. The house was restored in 2010.

Some believe that the short time he spent at Bjørgan was of formative significance for Bjørnson and left its mark on his peasant tales (Norwegian: bondefortellinger).

Bjørnstjerne was a guest at Kvikne twice as an adult, in 1869 and in 1897.
