= Bergens Stiftstidende =

Norwegian newspaper

Bergens Stiftstidende was a Norwegian newspaper, published in Bergen.

Bergens Stiftstidende was started in 1840. It went defunct in 1855. Editors were Hans Holmboe and the priest Peter Albert Sagen.
