= Kvikne Copper Works =

Copper works in Norway

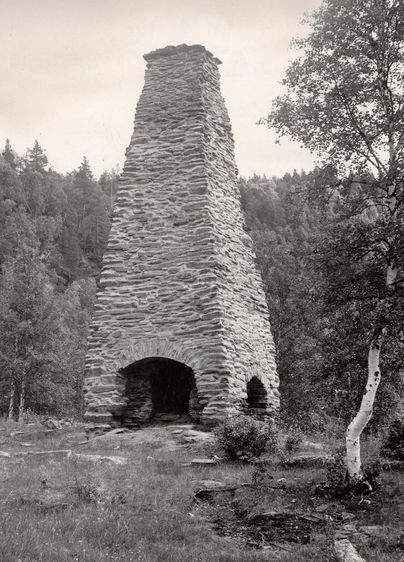

- Location within Norway
- 62°42′06″N 10°07′51″E
- Type: Copper works
- Location: Kvikne, Norway

The Kvikne Copper Works at Kvikne in Hedemarken county, Norway were operated from 1630, and were the largest copper works in Norway in the mid-17th century. The ore discovery was reported in 1629. The first mines were called Gabe Gottes and Segen Gottes. Gabe Gottes collapsed in 1677, and in 1682 the copper works suffered severe economic losses as a ship's load of copper was taken by pirates. In 1789, the mines were largely damaged by the flooding disaster Storofsen, and this virtually ended the operation of the mines. During the first 150 years of operation about 6,960 tonnes (6,850 long tons; 7,670 short tons) of refined copper were produced from the mines at Kvikne.
