= Knud Iversen Øyen =

Norwegian jurist and politician (1865–1942)

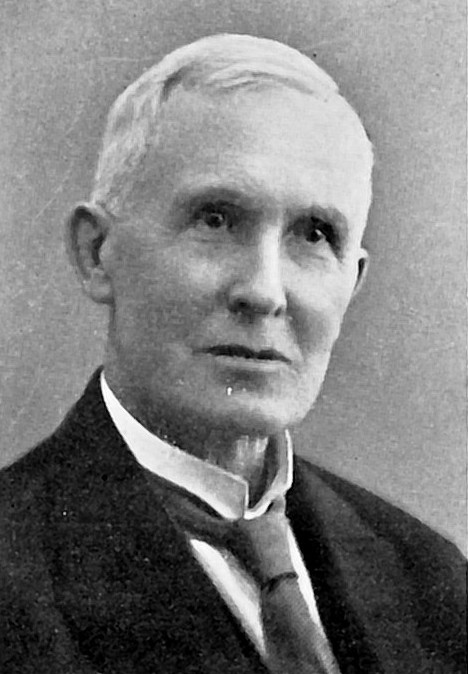

County Governor of Hedmark
- In office 1 August 1926 – 30 September 1935
- Monarch: Haakon VII
- Prime Minister: Ivar Lykke; Christopher Hornsrud; J. L. Mowinckel; Peder Kolstad; Jens Hundseid; Johan Nygaardsvold
- Preceded by: Thorvald Løchen
- Succeeded by: Knut M. Nordanger

Minister of Justice
- In office 26 July 1926 – 28 January 1928
- Prime Minister: Ivar Lykke
- Preceded by: Ingolf E. Christensen
- Succeeded by: Cornelius Holmboe

Personal details
- Born: 12 May 1865 Folldal, Østerdalen, Hedmark, Sweden-Norway
- Died: 14 November 1942 (aged 77) Ljan, Oslo, Norway
- Party: Conservative
- Spouse: Aagot Sørby (m. 1898)

Knud Iversen Øyen (12 May 1865 – 14 November 1942) was a Norwegian jurist and politician of the Conservative Party. He was a member of the cabinet Lykke, heading the Ministry of Justice from 1926 to 1928. He served as County Governor of Hedmark from 1926 to 1935.

Political offices
Preceded by Ingolf Elster Christensen	Norwegian Minister of Justice and the Police; 1926–1928	Succeeded by Cornelius Holmboe
Preceded by Torvald Løchen	County Governor of Hedmark; 1926–1935	Succeeded by Knut Monsen Nordanger
