= Rasmus Tønder Nissen =

Norwegian politician (1822–1882)

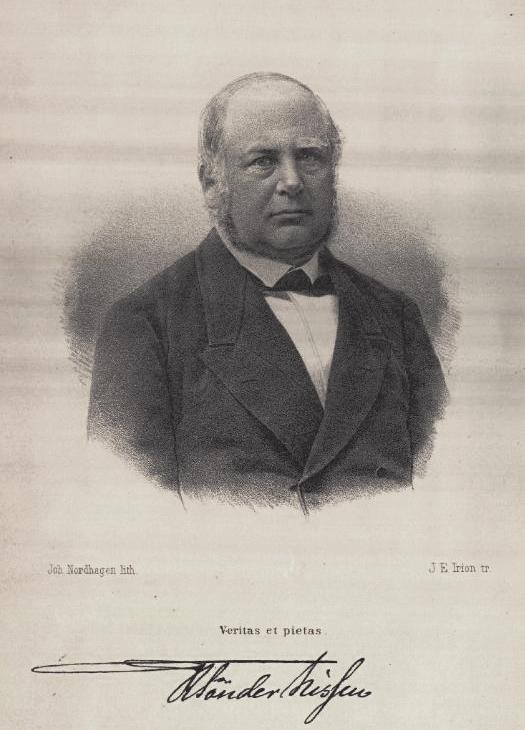
Rasmus Tønder Nissen (1822-1882)

Rasmus Tønder Nissen (14 January 1822 – 19 January 1882) was a Norwegian, educator, theologian and politician.

== Biography ==
Nissen was born at Melhus in Sør-Trøndelag. He attended to Trondheim Cathedral School graduating in 1839. He was Cand.theol. in 1843. He taught history, Greek and religion at Hartvig Nissen School and from 1852 he was director of the school. In 1864, he became the professor of church history at the University of Oslo. He was Minister of Education and Church Affairs 1874–1876, member of the Council of State Division in Stockholm 1875, 1876–1877 and 1880–1881, and Minister of Education and Church Affairs 1877–1880, 1880 and 1881–1882. In 1874 he was knighted by Order of Saint Olav, and he received the Commander's Cross of 1st Class 1880; he was also commander of the Order of the Polar Star.
