= Christopher Andreas Holmboe =

Norwegian philologist, orientalist and numismatist

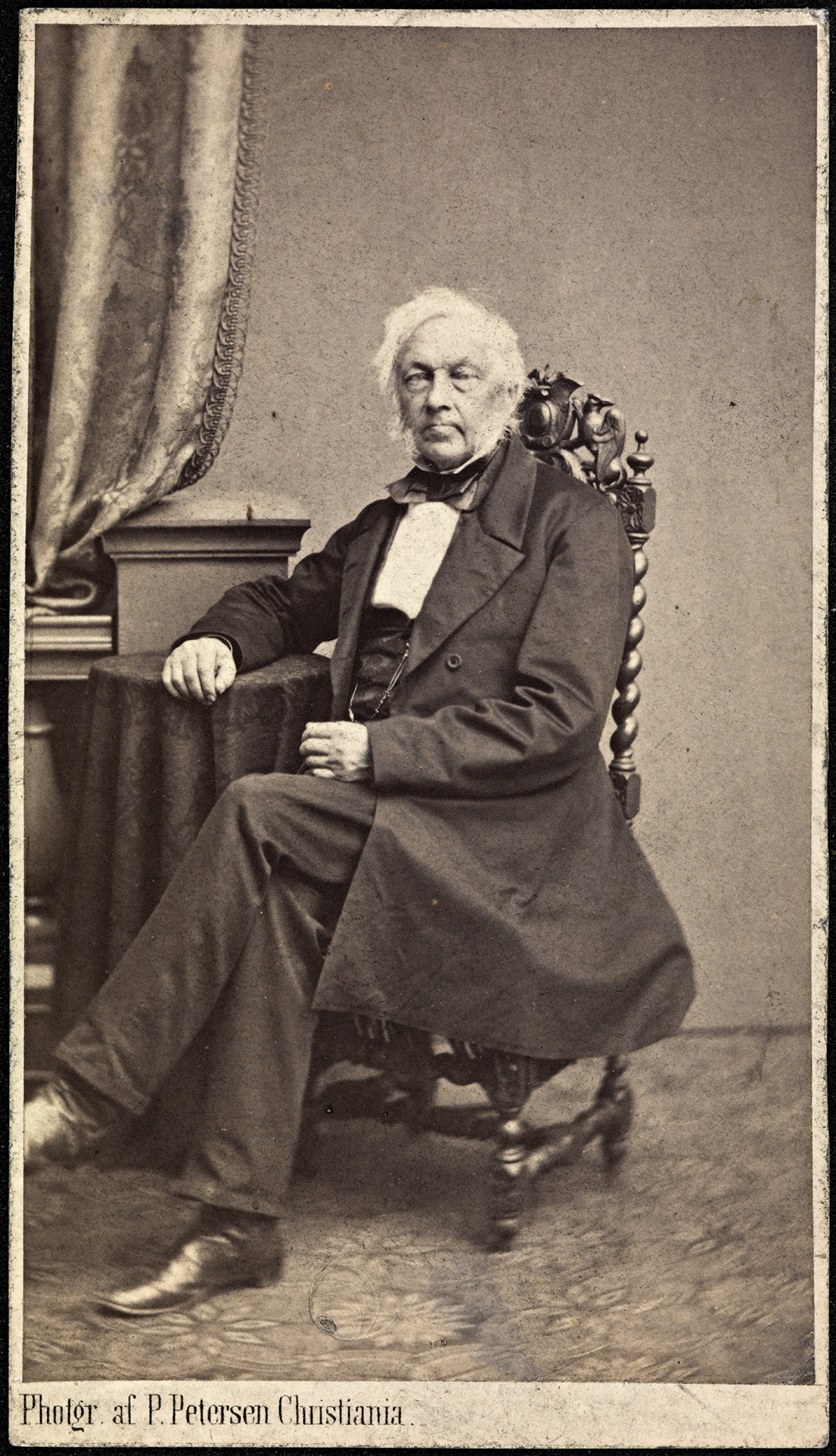
Christopher Andreas Holmboe

Christopher Andreas Holmboe (19 March 1796– 2 April 1882) was a Norwegian philologist, orientalist and numismatist.

Holmboe was born at Vang i Valdres in Christians amt (county), Norway. He was son of parish priest Jens Holmboe and brother of mathematician Bernt Michael Holmboe. He attended the Oslo Cathedral School and graduated as cand.theol. in 1818. He was professor of oriental languages at the University of Christiania (now University of Oslo) from 1825 to 1876. He also served as warden of the University Coin Cabinet.

== See also ==
- Holmboe (family)
