= Tone Groven Holmboe =

Norwegian composer and teacher (1930–2020)

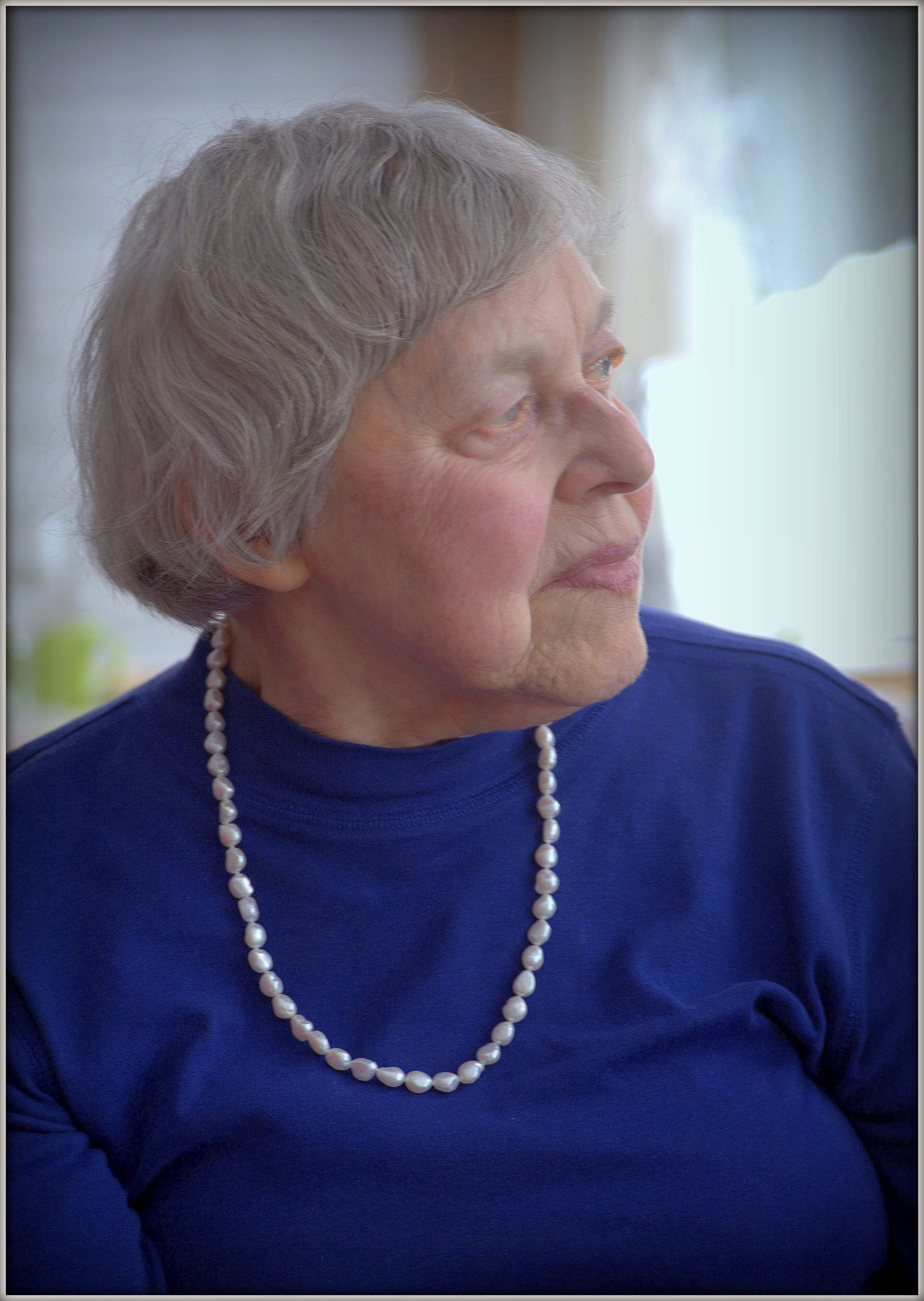
Tone Groven Holmboe

Tone Alis Groven Holmboe (9 January 1930 – 10 June 2020) was a Norwegian composer and teacher.

== Personal life ==
She was the second daughter of composer and innovator Eivind Groven, and teacher and singer Ragna Groven.

She was married to Adler Holmboe (1923-2014) of the Holmboe family, and they have three children, Ragnhild (1955), Kristin (1959) and Thorolf (1967).

== Works and musical style ==
She composed in a classical idiom, with strong flavours of Norwegian folk music. The music is fully tonal and structurally simple, yet with attention to small rhythmic and harmonic details and variations. The bulk of her work is songs, mostly for voice and piano (ca. 100). She has written a number of chamber musical duets and solos, most notably Syv slåtter og impresjoner for piano solo ("Seven Dances and Impressions for Piano Solo").

Her music has been regularly broadcast on Norwegian radio, and is represented on various recordings by other artists. On her seventieth birthday, she released her first CD as a composer, named Tonebilder ("tone paintings") (2000), with performances by Rolf Erik Nystrøm, alto and soprano saxophones, her cousin Sigmund Groven, harmonica, and 10 other performers, amongst them her three children. One track from this recording was used on the soundtrack of the popular Norwegian movie Elling (2001).
