= Cornelius Holmboe =

Norwegian politician (1881–1947)

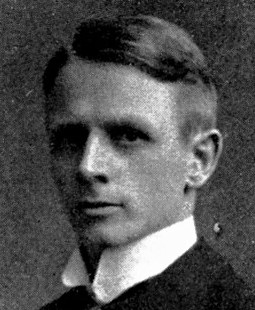

Minister of Justice
- In office 28 January 1928 – 15 February 1928
- Prime Minister: Christopher Hornsrud
- Preceded by: Knud Øyen
- Succeeded by: Haakon M. Evjenth

Personal details
- Born: 17 April 1881 Tromsø, Troms, Sweden-Norway
- Died: 16 November 1947 (aged 66) Oslo, Norway
- Party: Labour
- Spouse: Ingeborg Elieson Dybwad (m. 1907)
- Parent(s): Johannes Michael Holmboe; Helga Dybwad

Cornelius Holmboe (17 April 1881 – 16 November 1947) was a Norwegian politician for the Labour Party. He was briefly the Minister of Justice in early 1928.

== Personal life ==
He was born on 17 April 1881, in Tromsø, the youngest son of physician Johannes Michael Holmboe (1844–1918) and his wife Helga Dybwad (1849–1881). He had several brothers and sisters, and, after the death of his mother, several half-siblings. His grandfather Leonhard Christian Borchgrevink Holmboe was involved in politics, so were his granduncles Even Hammer Holmboe and Hans Holmboe.

In 1907, he married Ingeborg Elieson Dybwad. The couple had two daughters and one son.

== Career ==
Holmboe finished his secondary education in Tromsø in 1898, enrolled in law studies and graduated as cand.jur. in 1903. He then worked as a jurist and newspaper editor, editing Solungen from 1907 to 1908 and Den 1ste Mai from 1908 to 1909. In 1909, he was hired as an attorney in Tromsø. He worked as a defender in the court of appeal from 1915 and the district court from 1923. He was also chairman of the board of the savings bank Tromsøsundets Sparebank from 1924 to 1937.

On 28 January 1928, he was appointed Minister of Justice and the Police in the cabinet Hornsrud. The cabinet Hornsrud was the first Labour Party cabinet in Norway. Fearing widespread socialism in Norway, the other parliamentary parties defeated the cabinet Hornsrud already after eighteen days, in February 1928, on a vote of no confidence. As an effect, Holmboe was not allowed to continue as Minister of Justice.

Cornelius Holmboe later became district stipendiary magistrate (sorenskriver) of Nord-Hedmark, from 1937.

He died on 16 November 1947, aged 66, in Oslo.

Political offices
Preceded by Knud Iversen Øyen	Norwegian Minister of Justice and the Police; January 1928–February 1928	Succeeded by Haakon Martin Evjenth
