= Kvikne Church (Tynset) =

Church in Innlandet, Norway

- Kvikne kirke
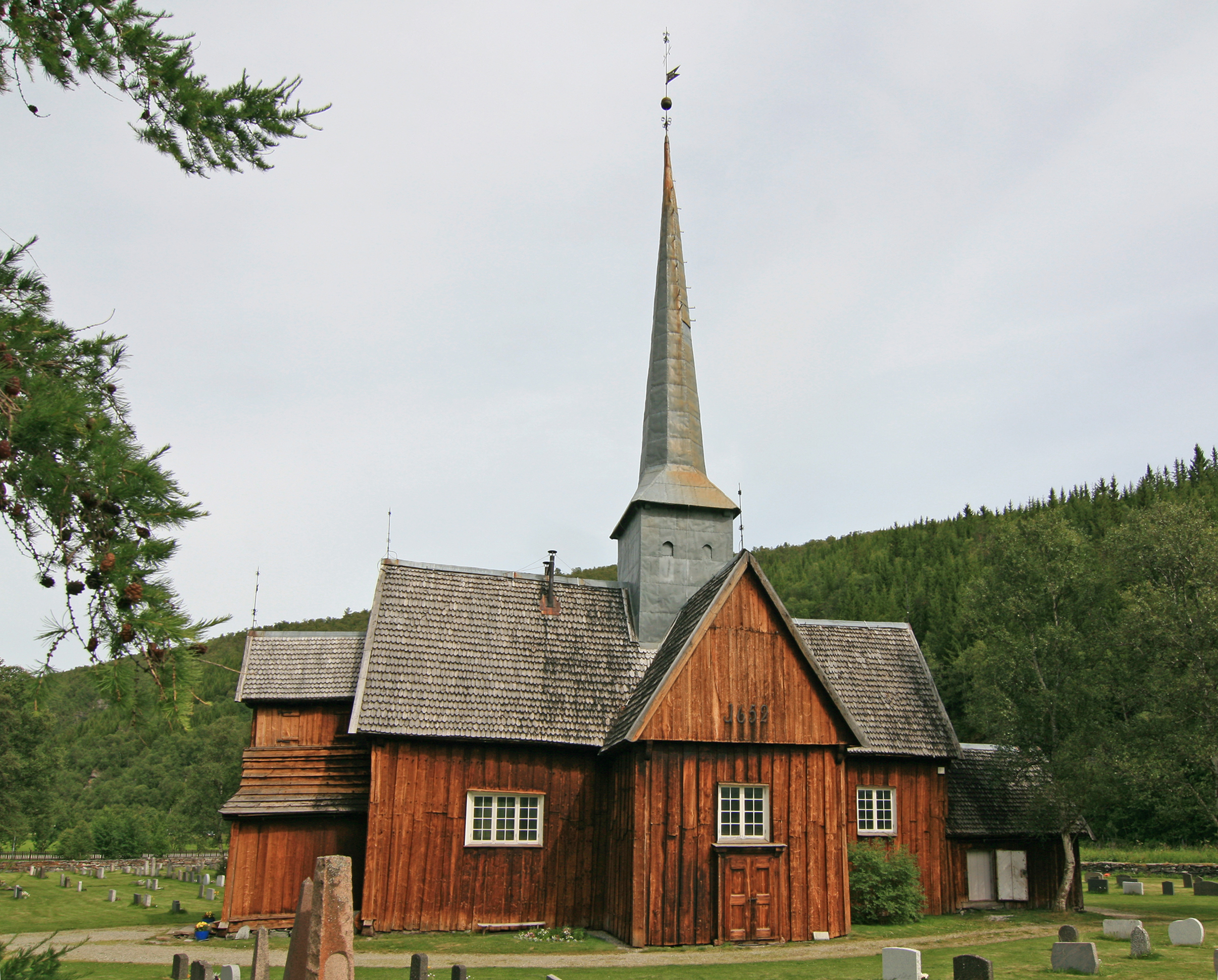
- View of the church
- Kvikne Church
- 62°35′01″N 10°17′06″E
- Location: Tynset Municipality, Innlandet
- Country: Norway
- Denomination: Church of Norway
- Previous denomination: Catholic Church
- Churchmanship: Evangelical Lutheran

History
- Status: Parish church
- Founded: 13th century
- Consecrated: 1 July 1654

Architecture
- Functional status: Active
- Architect: Knut Mortensen
- Architectural type: Cruciform
- Completed: 1654 (372 years ago)

Specifications
- Capacity: 200
- Materials: Wood

Administration
- Diocese: Hamar bispedømme
- Deanery: Nord-Østerdal prosti
- Parish: Kvikne
- Norwegian Cultural Heritage Site
- Type: Church
- Status: Automatically protected
- ID: 84864

Kvikne Church (Norwegian: Kvikne kirke) is a parish church of the Church of Norway in Tynset Municipality in Innlandet county, Norway. It is located in the village of Yset. It is the church for the Kvikne parish which is part of the Nord-Østerdal prosti (deanery) in the Diocese of Hamar. The brown, wooden church was built in a cruciform design in 1654 using plans drawn up by the architect Knut Mortensen. The church seats about 200 people.

The Bjørgan parsonage is the former home for the priests serving the church. It is now a museum.

== History ==
The earliest existing historical records of the church date back to the year 1570, but the church was not new that year. The first church in Kvikne was a wooden stave church that was possibly built during the 13th century (a crucifix in the church has been dated to that time period, so it's possible that is when the church was first constructed). When copper mining became quite prevalent in the area during the 1630s, the population increased and the church became too small for the parish. The old church was torn down on 12 July 1652. Work began soon afterwards on building a new church on the same site. Knut Mortensen was the lead builder. The new timber-framed cruciform church building was constructed from 1652 to 1654. Some of the materials from the old church were reused in the construction of the new church. The new church was consecrated on 1 July 1654. In 1733, the church was renovated a bit. A new sacristy was built as an extension to the choir in the eastern cross-arm. Also, the windows were replaced with new, larger windows. In 1768, a new church porch with a small bell tower was constructed on the west end of the western cross-arm.

In 1814, this church served as an election church (Norwegian: valgkirke). Together with more than 300 other parish churches across Norway, it was a polling station for elections to the 1814 Norwegian Constituent Assembly which wrote the Constitution of Norway. This was Norway's first national elections. Each church parish was a constituency that elected people called "electors" who later met together in each county to elect the representatives for the assembly that was to meet at Eidsvoll Manor later that year.

== Media gallery ==
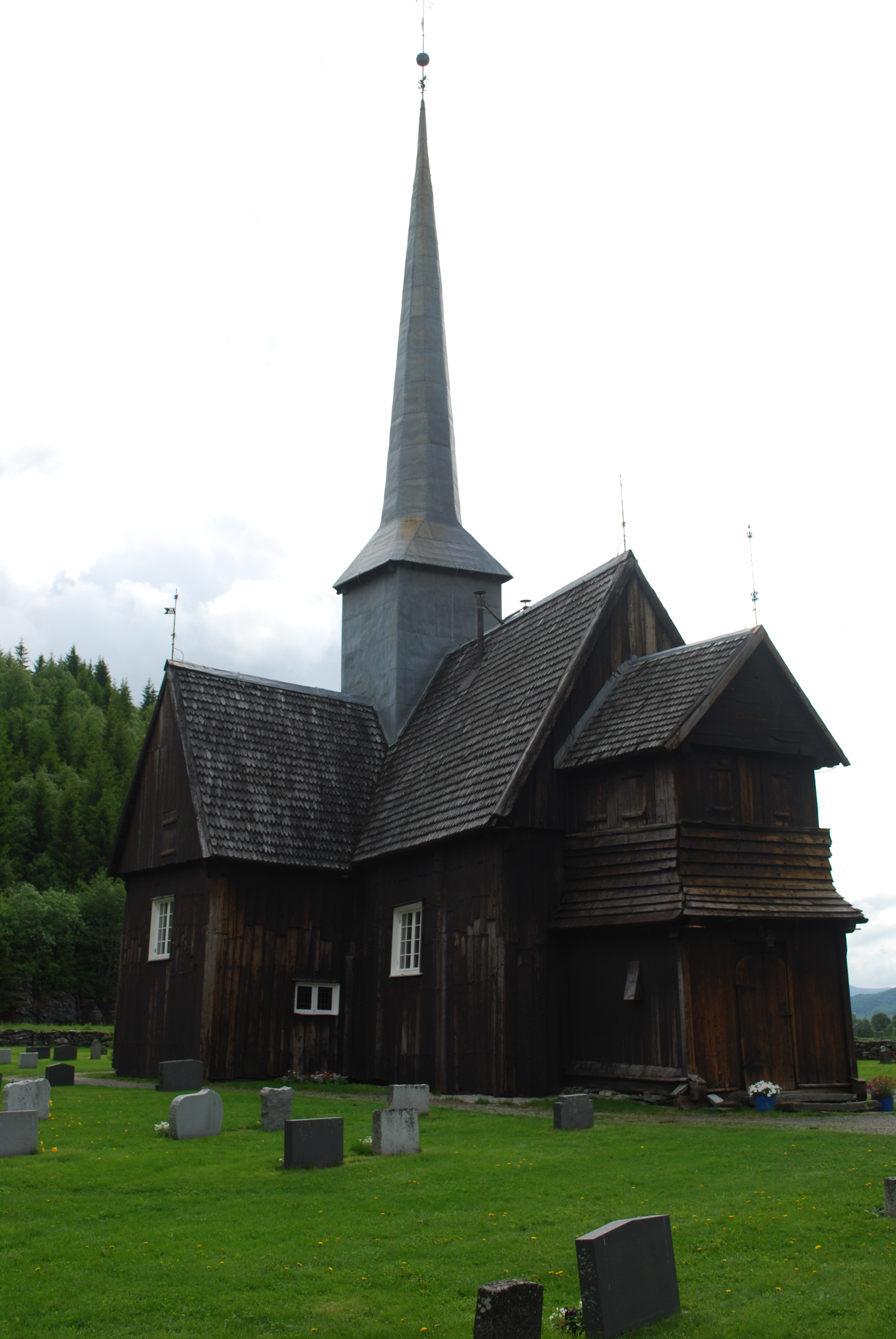

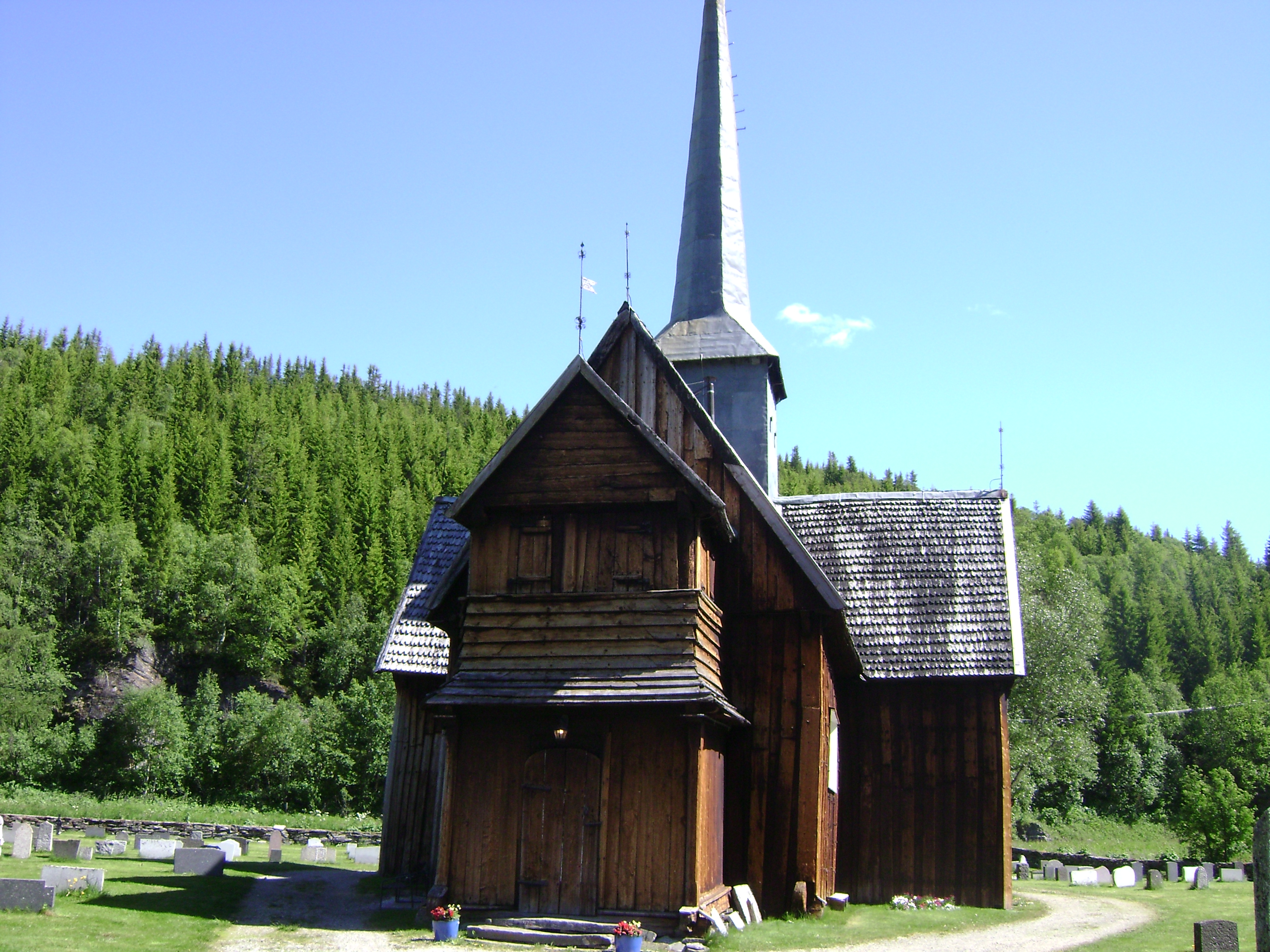

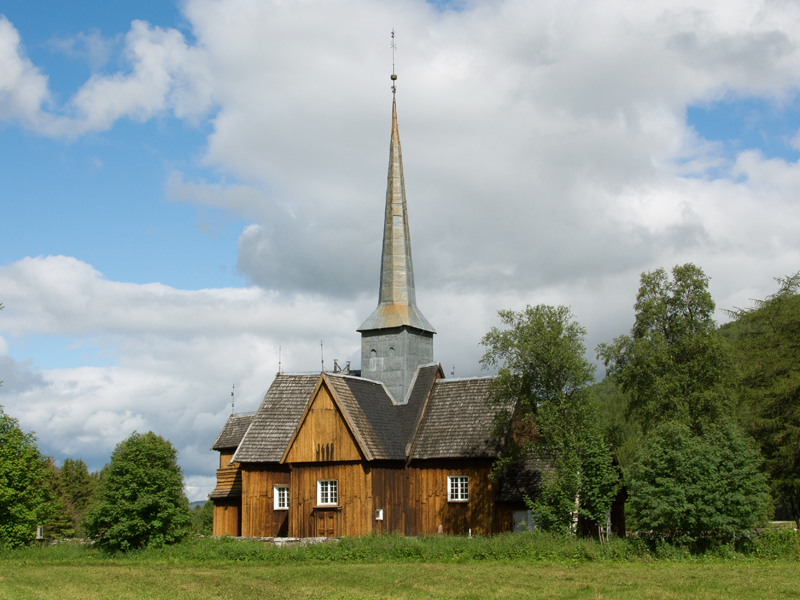

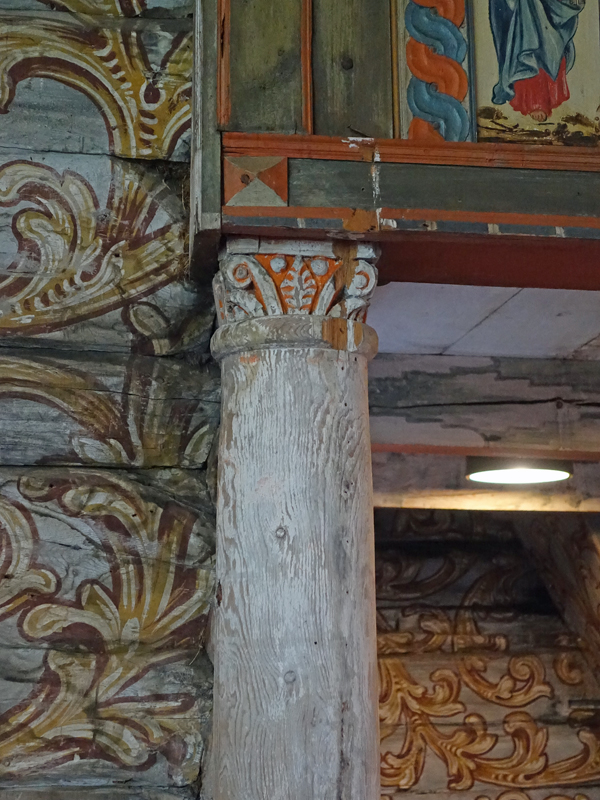

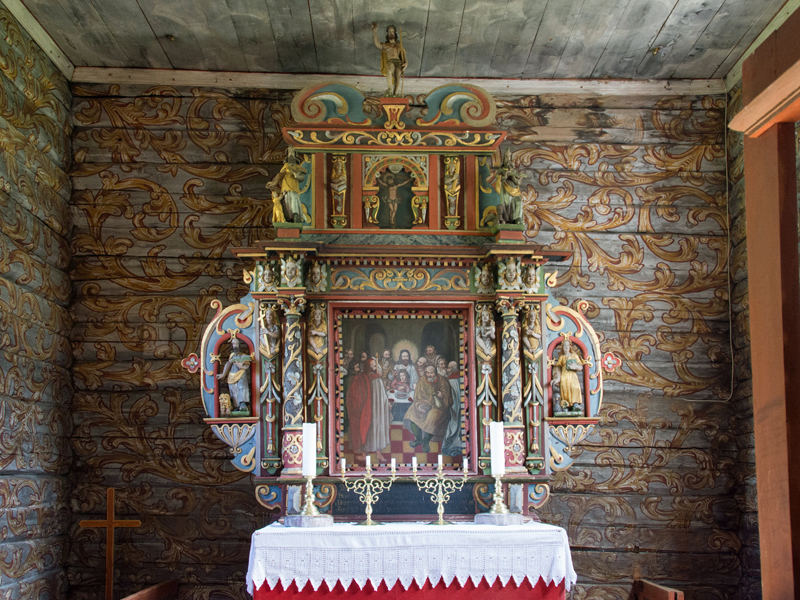

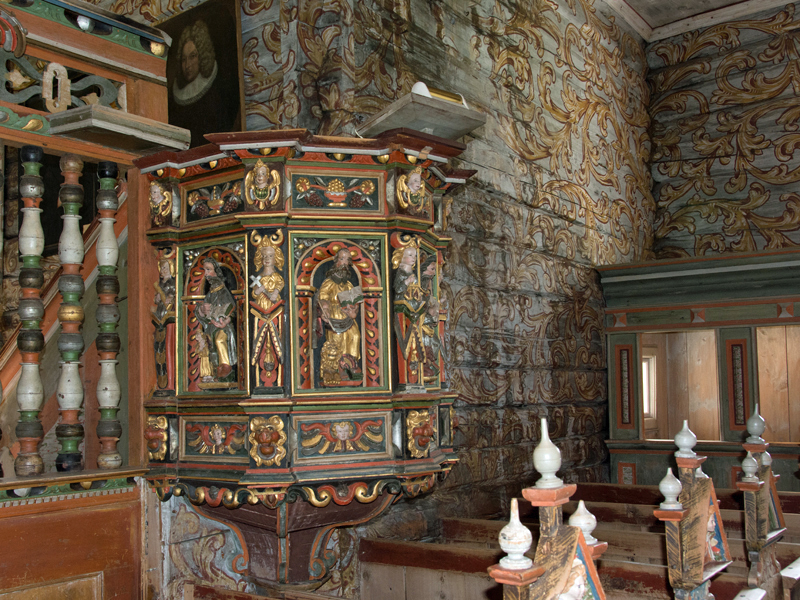

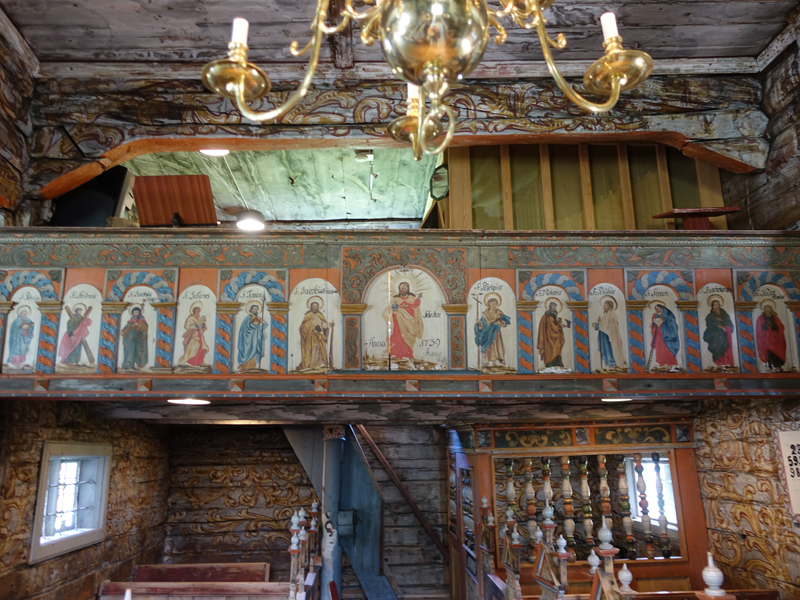

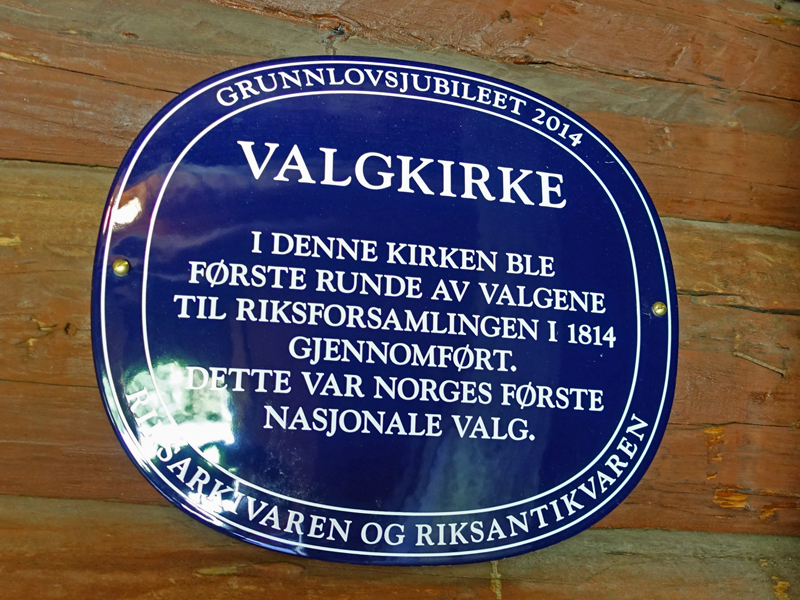

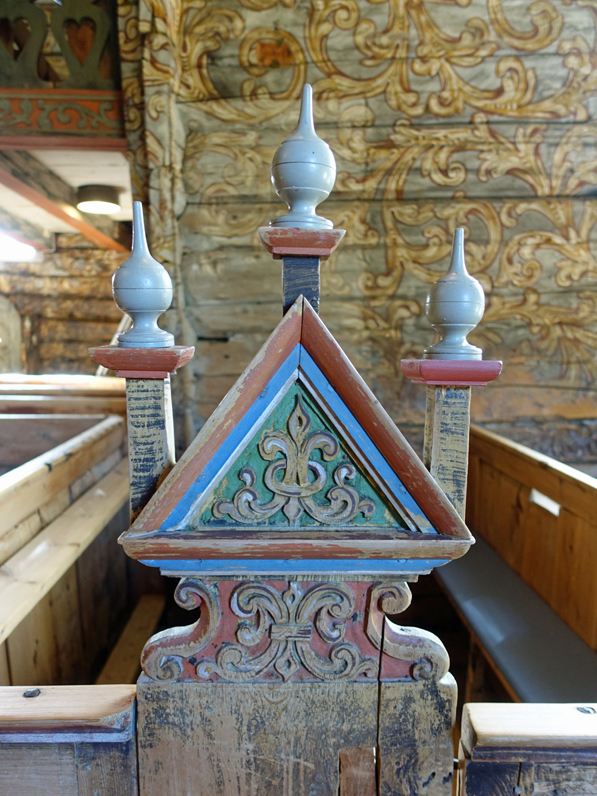

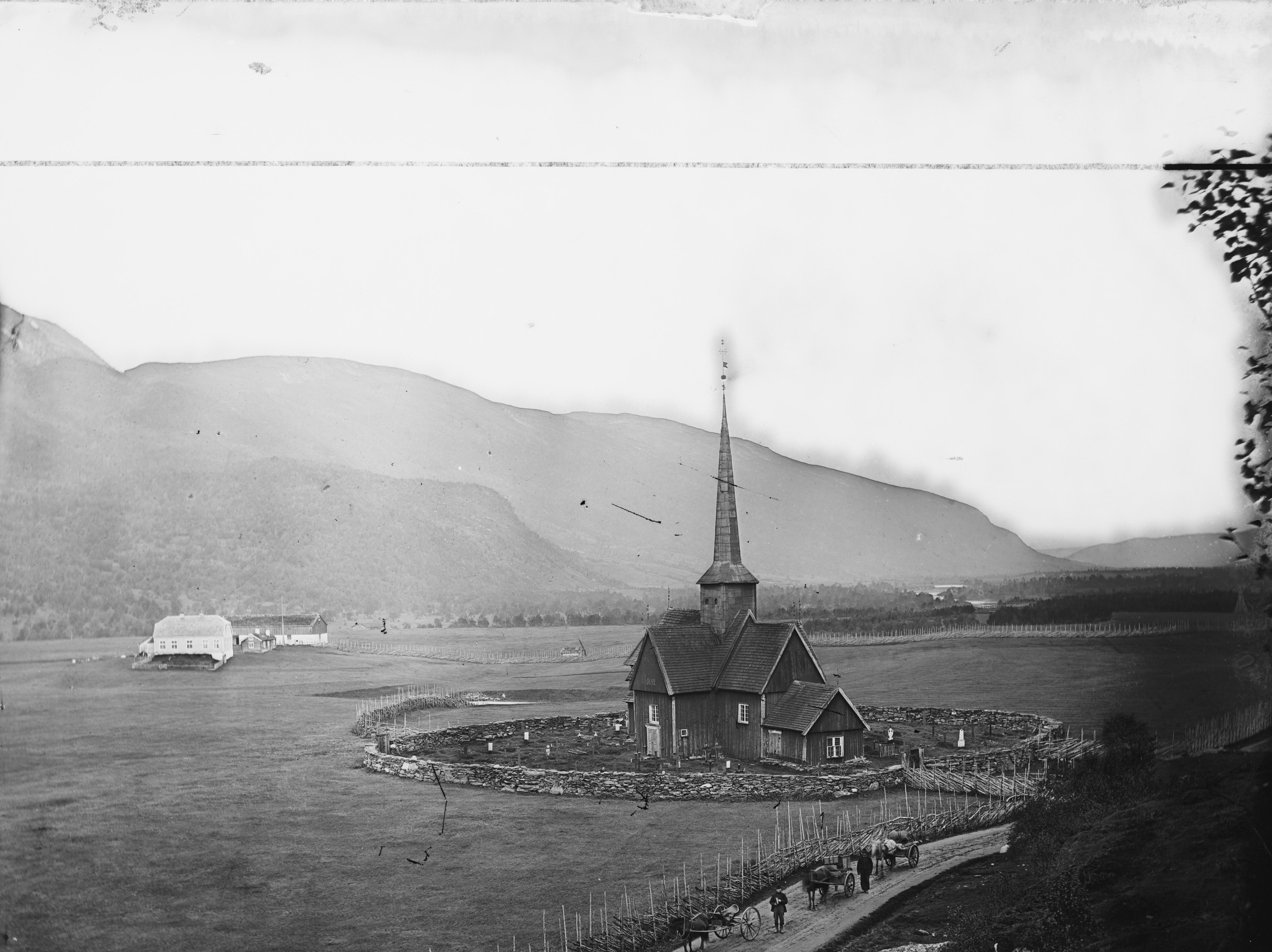

== See also ==
- List of churches in Hamar
