= Yset =

Village in Tynset Municipality, Norway

Yset Kvikne
- Village
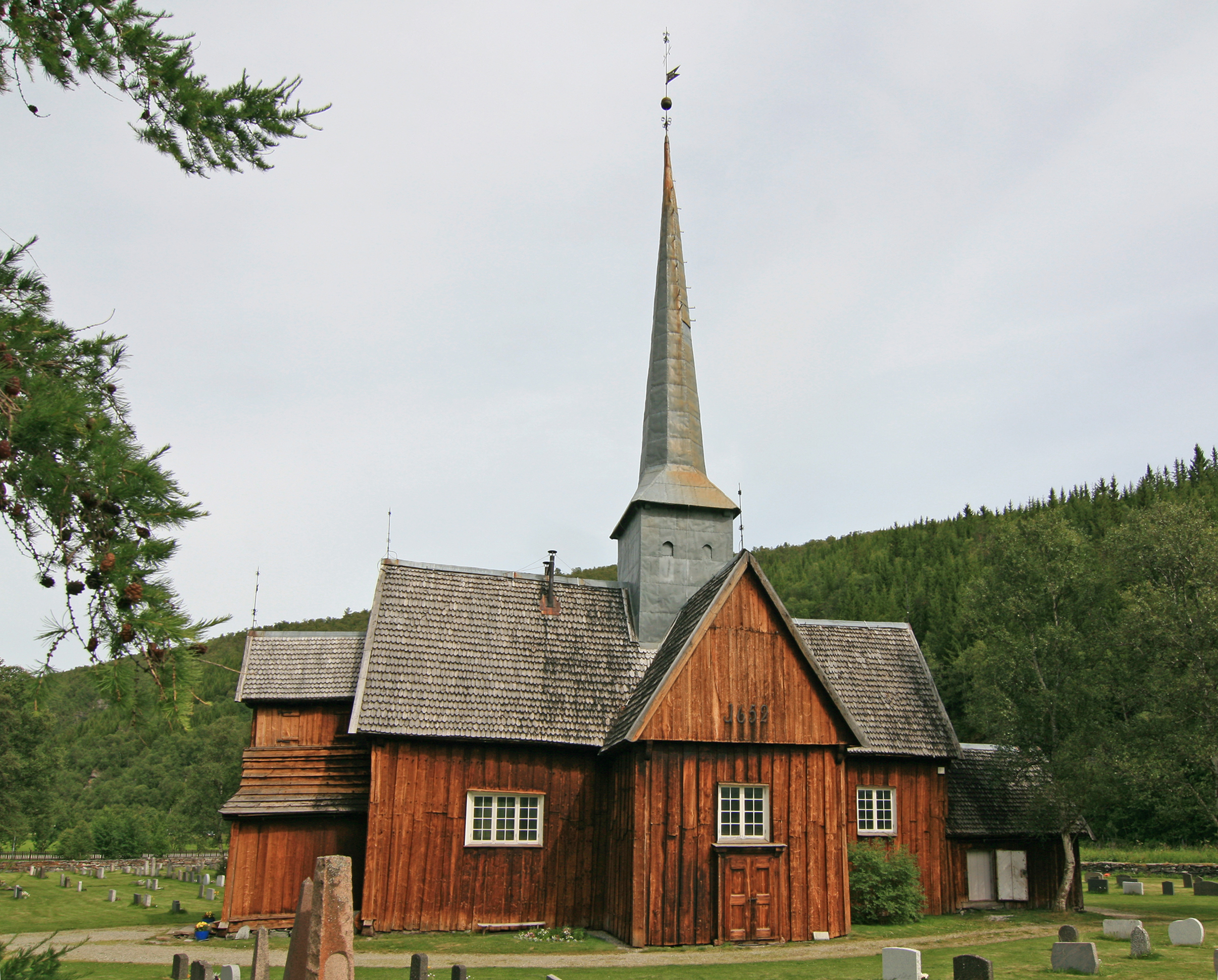
- View of the village church
- Interactive map of Yset; Kvikne
- Location within Innlandet Location within Norway
- Coordinates: 62.56457°N 10.32343°E
- Country: Norway
- Region: Central Norway
- County: Innlandet
- District: Østerdalen
- Municipality: Tynset Municipality
- Elevation: 560 m (1,840 ft)
- Time zone: UTC+01:00 (CET)
  - Summer (DST): UTC+02:00 (CEST)
- Post Code: 2590 Yset

Yset or Kvikne is a village in Tynset Municipality in Innlandet county, Norway. The mountain village is located near the mountain pass that lies between the large Østerdalen valley and Trøndelag county.

The village is located along the Orkla River at the confluence with the Ya River about 31 kilometres (19 mi) southeast of the village of Innset and about 33 kilometres (21 mi) northwest of the town of Tynset. Norwegian National Road 3 passes through the village.

The old dam construction for the Eidsfossen Hydroelectric Power Station can be seen from National Road 3 about 5 kilometers (3.1 mi) south of Yset.

== History ==
The village was the administrative centre of the old Kvikne Municipality which existed from 1838 until 1966.

The Norwegian author Bjørnstjerne Bjørnson was born at the Bjørgan parsonage near Kvikne Church which lies in the village.

Vollan gård in Kvikne is the site of the national park center for the nearby Forollhogna National Park. The farm was the site for filming of the movie Secondløitnanten in 1993.
