= Jens Holmboe (bailiff) =

Norwegian bailiff (1752–1804)

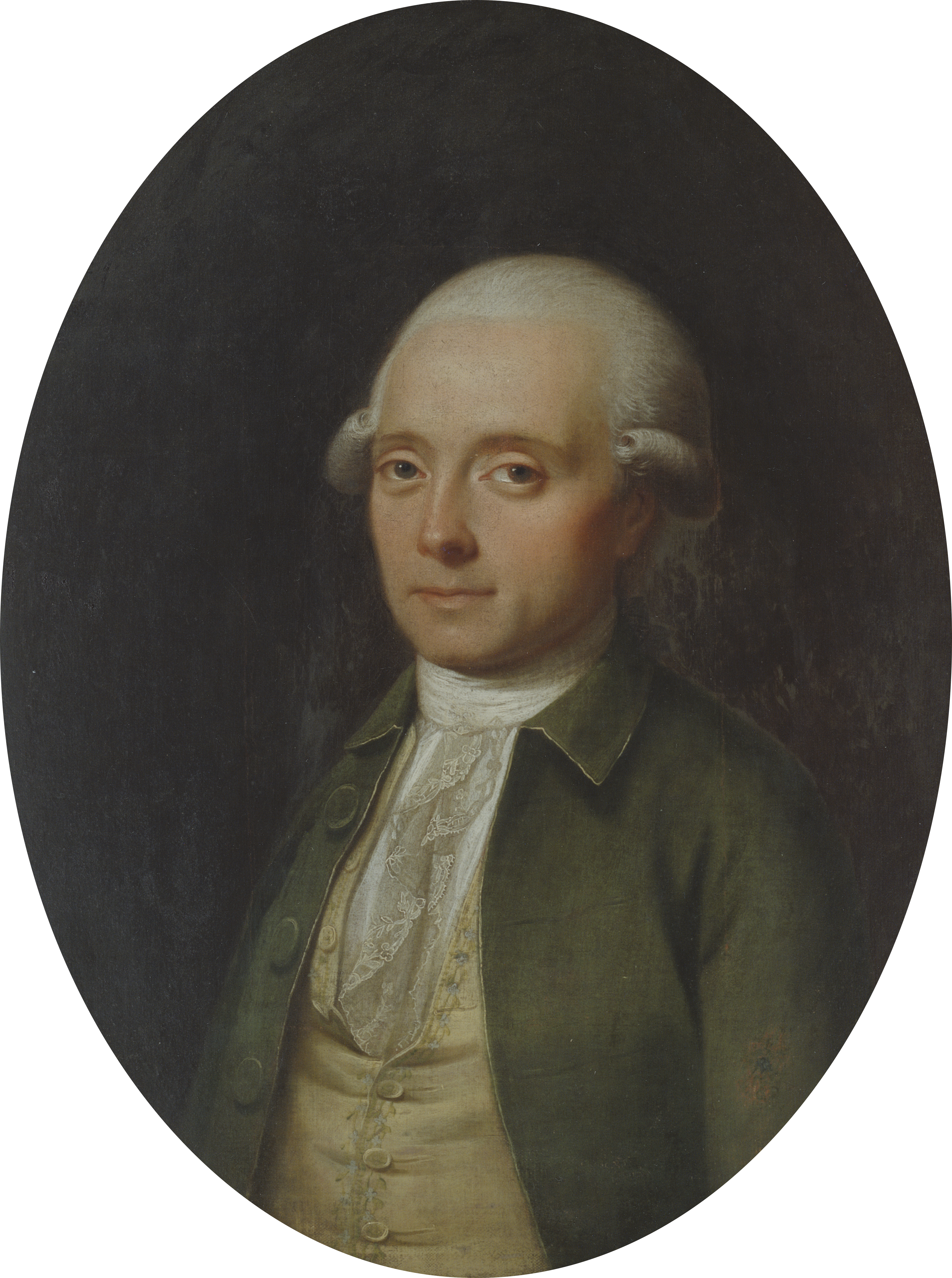
- Portrait of Jens Holmboe in Copenhagen, 1784–1785.
- Born: 5 November 1752; Lesja, Norway
- Died: 4 December 1804 (aged 52); Trondenes, Norway
- Occupation: Bailiff
- Spouse: Anna Irgens (m. 1783)
- Children: 12, including Even, Hans and Leonhard
- Relatives: Jens Holmboe (grandson); Hans Conrad Holmboe (grandson)

Jens Holmboe (5 November 1752 – 4 December 1804) was a Norwegian fogd (bailiff). He is notable for his role in the settling of the Målselvdalen valley in Troms county.

== Personal life ==
He was born in Lesja as the son of Hans Jenssen Holmboe (1721–1756) and Birgitte Marie Reinholtsdatter Ziegler (1723–1778).

In 1783, he married Anna Margrethe Irgens, who hailed from Tromsøe. The couple had twelve children. Their sons Even, Hans and Leonhard Christian became involved in politics. Their son Michael Wide Holmboe was the father of politician Jens Holmboe and businessman Hans Conrad Holmboe, grandfather of painter Thorolf Holmboe and great-grandfather of Ragnhild Rød and Charles Robertson.

== Career ==
Holmboe worked as a bailiff (fogd) in Senja and Tromsøe between 1781 and 1800. He made a lasting mark in the region, because after the Storofsen flood, he organized the settling in the uninhabited Målselvdalen valley, in what would later become Målselv Municipality and Bardu Municipality. Farmers from the Gudbrandsdalen and Østerdalen valleys moved north mainly between 1791 and 1800, and Jens Holmboe helped about forty families with supplies and funding. Topographically, Målselvdalen was and is similar to Østerdalen.

He died on 4 December 1804, aged 52, in Ervik in Trondenes. A bauta to commemorate him was raised there in 1964.
