= Carl Fredrik Holmboe =

Norwegian engineer and business executive

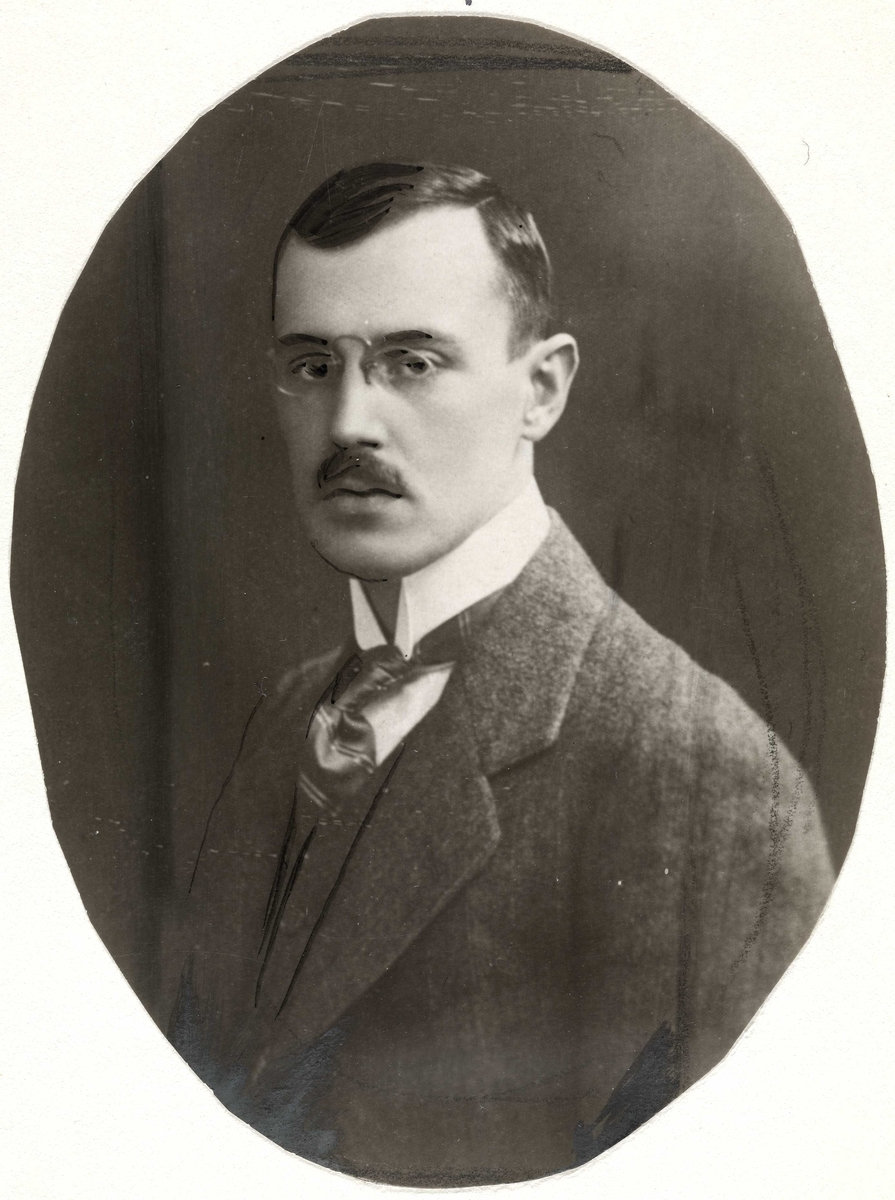
Carl Fredrik Holmboe (ca. 1915-1925)

Carl Fredrik Holmboe (25 August 1882 – 15 January 1960) was a Norwegian engineer and business executive.

== Biography ==
He was born in Kristiania (now Oslo), Norway as the only son of Jens Anton Holmboe (1828–92) and his third wife Marie Aarreberg (1842–1917). He had several half-brothers and half-sisters. His grandfather Leonhard Christian Borchgrevink Holmboe was a priest and national politician.

Holmboe studied electrical and mechanical engineering in Germany. Subsequently he was a consultant for several Norwegian based companies. He first made his mark by producing the technologically advanced factory at Fredrikstad for the company Denofa. In 1915 he was hired as chief engineer in the company Lever Brothers, being promoted to technical director in 1921. He was then CEO of De-No-Fa from 1923 to 1946, except for the period between 1940 and 1946. Denofa AS later merged with Lilleborg, and is today a part of the Orkla Group.
