= Jens Holmboe (botanist) =

Norwegian botanist, professor and author (1880–1943)

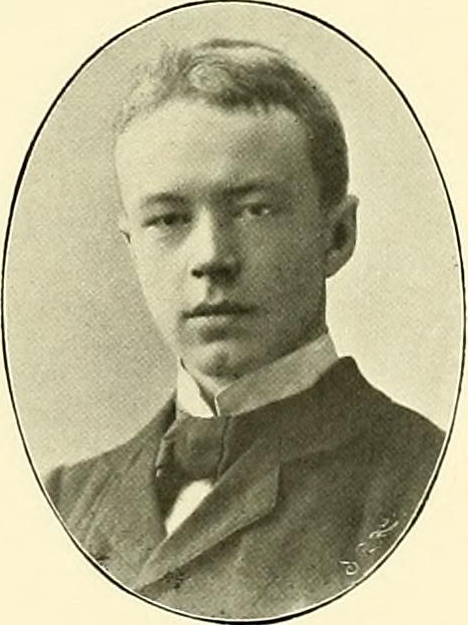
Jens Holmboe ca 1900

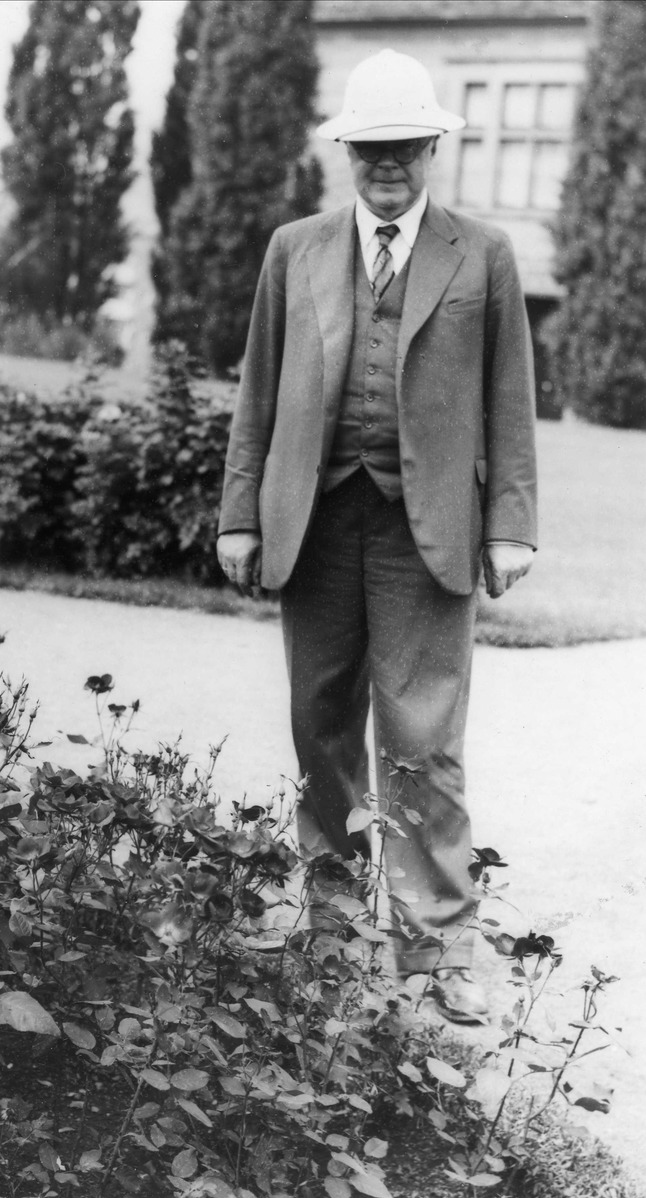
Jens at the University Botanical Garden (Oslo) in the 1930s

Jens Holmboe (5 May 1880 – 24 July 1943) was a Norwegian botanist, professor and author.

Jens Holmboe was born at Tvedestrand in Nedenes county, Norway. He was the oldest son of physician Michael Holmboe (1852-1918) and his wife Eleonore Vogt (1857–1901). His grandfather Jens Holmboe was a prominent politician. He attended Oslo Cathedral School and studied botany at the University of Christiania (now University of Oslo).

He was hired as a curator of the Botanical Department of Bergen Museum in 1906, and became professor there in 1914. In 1925 he was appointed professor at the University of Oslo and manager of the University Botanical Garden. Among his notable publications were Planterester i norske Torvmyrer in 1903, Studies on the Vegetation of Cyprus in 1914, and the six-volume Våre ville planter, written with Torstein Lagerberg and published between 1937 and 1940. He was also editor-in-chief of the periodical Naturen between 1906 and 1925.
