= Jens Holmboe (politician) =

Norwegian politician (1821–1891)

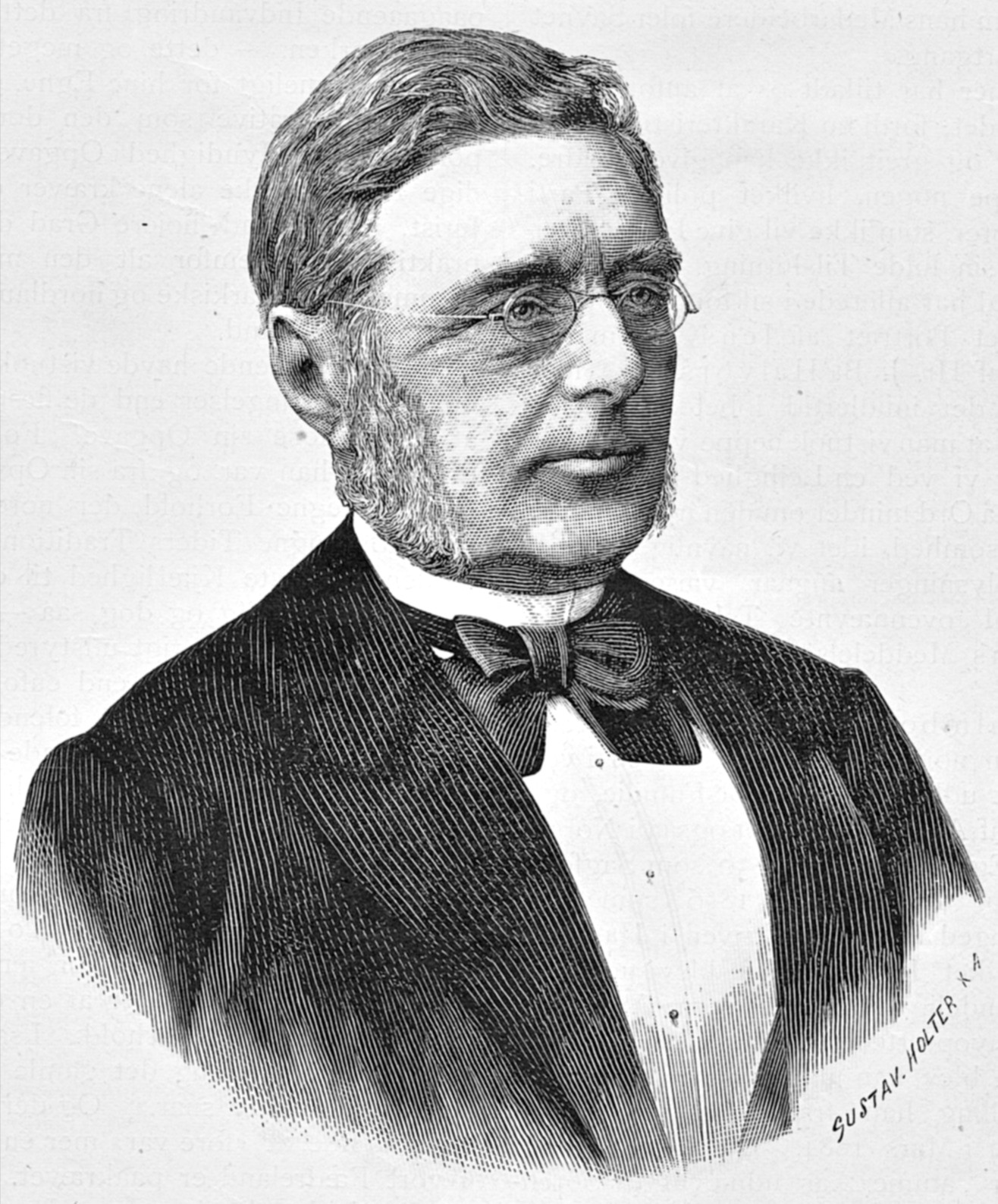
- 1891 lithograph of Holmboe

Governor of Finnmarkens
- In office 1866–1874
- Preceded by: Mathias B. K. Nannestad
- Succeeded by: Johan Blackstad

Personal details
- Born: 14 July 1821 Tromsøe, Norway
- Died: 13 July 1891 (aged 69) Kristiania, Norway
- Citizenship: Norway
- Profession: Politician

Jens Holmboe (14 July 1821 – 13 July 1891) was a Norwegian politician for the Conservative Party. A jurist by education, he was a member of the Norwegian Parliament for five terms, and held several different government posts from 1874 to 1884.

== Personal life ==
He was born on 14 July 1821, in Tromsøe, the son of Michael Wide Holmboe (1791–1863) and his wife Anna Rasch Schjelderup (1794–1878). He had several brothers and sisters, including businessman Hans Conrad Holmboe. His grandfather of the same name was a bailiff, and his uncles Even Hammer Holmboe and Hans Holmboe and Leonhard Christian Borchgrevink Holmboe became involved in politics.

In 1851, he married Bergithe Caroline Killengren from Tromsøe. The couple had a son Michael Holmboe and one daughter. Bergithe died in 1853, a week after giving birth to the daughter. In 1856, Jens Holmboe married Caroline Juell, who hailed from Kragerø. The couple had one daughter. Caroline Juell died after giving birth to her. Michael Holmboe later had a son named Jens in 1880, who became a noted botanist.

== Career ==
Jens Holmboe graduated as cand.jur. in 1845, and was appointed as bailiff (foged) and district stipendiary magistrate (sorenskriver) in the northern city of Hammerfest in 1856. He was elected to the Norwegian Parliament in 1859, 1862 and 1868, representing the constituency of Finmarkens Amt. which at that time included both Finnmark and Troms. When Finmarkens Amt was split in two in 1866, Holmboe became County Governor of Finnmark. He held this position until 1874.

He then began a career in the executive branch of government. He was appointed Minister of Justice and the Police on 30 April 1874. He left on 30 September the same year, only to become member of the Council of State Division in Stockholm the next day. He held this position for exactly one year, except for a period between 26 May and 20 July 1875. Then, on 1 October 1875, he was appointed Minister of Finance and Customs. On 1 November 1876, he was appointed Minister of Church and Education, and on 1 October the next year he became Minister of the Navy and Postal Affairs. Exactly one year after that he was moved to the Council of State Division in Stockholm. On 1 September 1879, he was appointed Minister of Finance and Customs for the second time, a position he held until 31 August the next year. On 1 November 1880, he became Minister of Church and Education again, leaving exactly one year later, and with a short hiatus in September 1881. Ten months as Minister of the Navy and Postal Affairs followed, before one year as Minister of Justice and the Police. From 1 September 1883 he was a member of the Council of State Division in Stockholm for the third time. Ultimately, he was impeached in March 1884, together with the rest of the cabinet Selmer. Some sources state that he, during this period, headed each government ministry in Norway, but this is not true. He was never Minister of Defence, nor Minister of Auditing.

Having been impeached from his government seat, he again stood for election to Parliament, and was elected for the term 1886–1888. He was appointed stipendiary magistrate (byfogd) in Arendal, and then district stipendiary magistrate in Moss. He was elected for one final term in Parliament in 1889, representing the constituency Smaalenenes Amt.

He died on 13 July 1891, aged 69, in Kristiania.

Political offices
Preceded by Mathias B. K. Nannestad	County Governor of Finnmarkens amt 1866–1874	Succeeded by Johan Blackstad
Preceded by Henrik Laurentius Helliesen	Norwegian Minister of Finance and Customs; 1875–1876	Succeeded by Henrik Laurentius Helliesen
Preceded by Rasmus Tønder Nissen	Norwegian Minister of Church and Education; 1876–1877	Succeeded by Rasmus Tønder Nissen
Preceded by Jacob Lerche Johansen	Norwegian Minister of the Navy and Postal Affairs; 1877–1878	Succeeded by Jacob Lerche Johansen
Preceded by Henrik Laurentius Helliesen	Norwegian Minister of Finance and Customs; 1879–1880	Succeeded by Henrik Laurentius Helliesen
Preceded by Rasmus Tønder Nissen	Norwegian Minister of Church and Education; 1880–15 September 1881	Succeeded by Halfdan Lehman (acting)
Preceded by Halfdan Lehman (acting)	Norwegian Minister of Church and Education; 26 September 1881–30 September 1881	Succeeded by Rasmus Tønder Nissen
Preceded by Jacob Lerche Johansen	Norwegian Minister of the Navy and Postal Affairs; November 1881–1882	Succeeded by Jacob Lerche Johansen
Legal offices
Preceded by Jacob Aall (acting)	Norwegian Minister of Justice and the Police; April 1874–September 1874	Succeeded by Johan Collett Falsen
Preceded by Ole Bachke	Norwegian Minister of Justice and the Police; 1882–1883	Succeeded by Christian Jensen
