= Even Hammer Holmboe =

Norwegian politician (1792–1859)

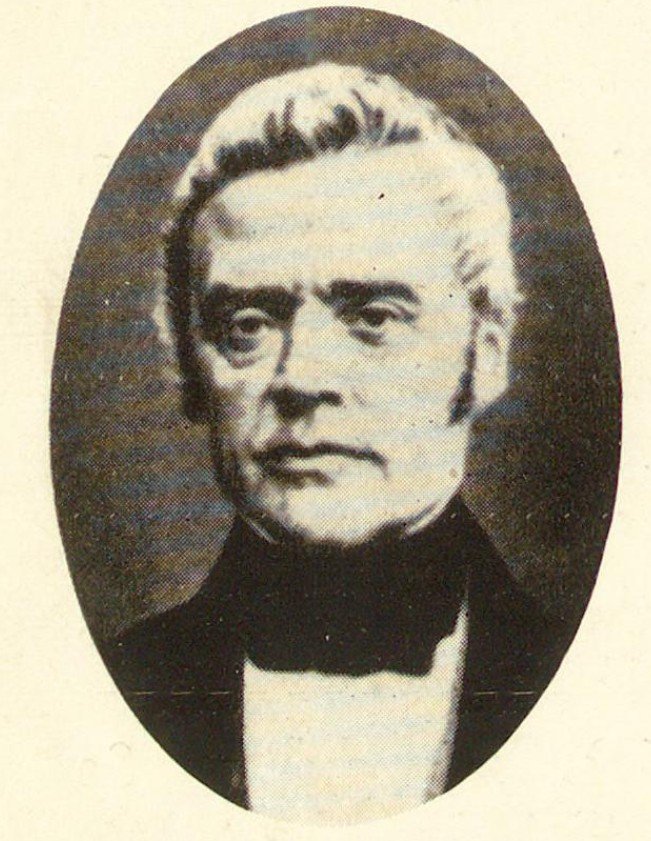
- Even Hammer Holmboe (1792–1859)

Member of Storting for Finmarkens Amt
- In office 1839–?

Personal details
- Born: 18 November 1792 Trondenes, Norway
- Died: 23 December 1859 (aged 67)
- Spouse: Maren Rønning (m. 1823)
- Relations: Leonhard Holmboe (brother); Hans Holmboe (brother); Jens Holmboe (nephew)
- Children: 10
- Parent: Jens Holmboe (father)
- Occupation: Merchant, vice consul

Even Hammer Holmboe (18 November 1792 – 23 December 1859) was a Norwegian politician.

== Personal life ==
He was born in Trondenes as the son of bailiff Jens Holmboe (1752–1804) and his wife Anna Margrethe Irgens (1766–1851). He had several brothers and sisters. His brothers Hans and Leonhard Christian became involved in politics, so did his nephew Jens Holmboe.

In 1823, he married Maren Johanne Rønning, who hailed from Lofoten. The couple had five sons and five daughters.

== Career ==
He was elected to the Norwegian Parliament in 1839, representing the constituency of Finmarkens Amt (which at that time included Finnmark and Troms). He served only one term.

He worked as a merchant and vice consul.
