= Hans Holmboe =

Norwegian educator and politician (1898–1968)

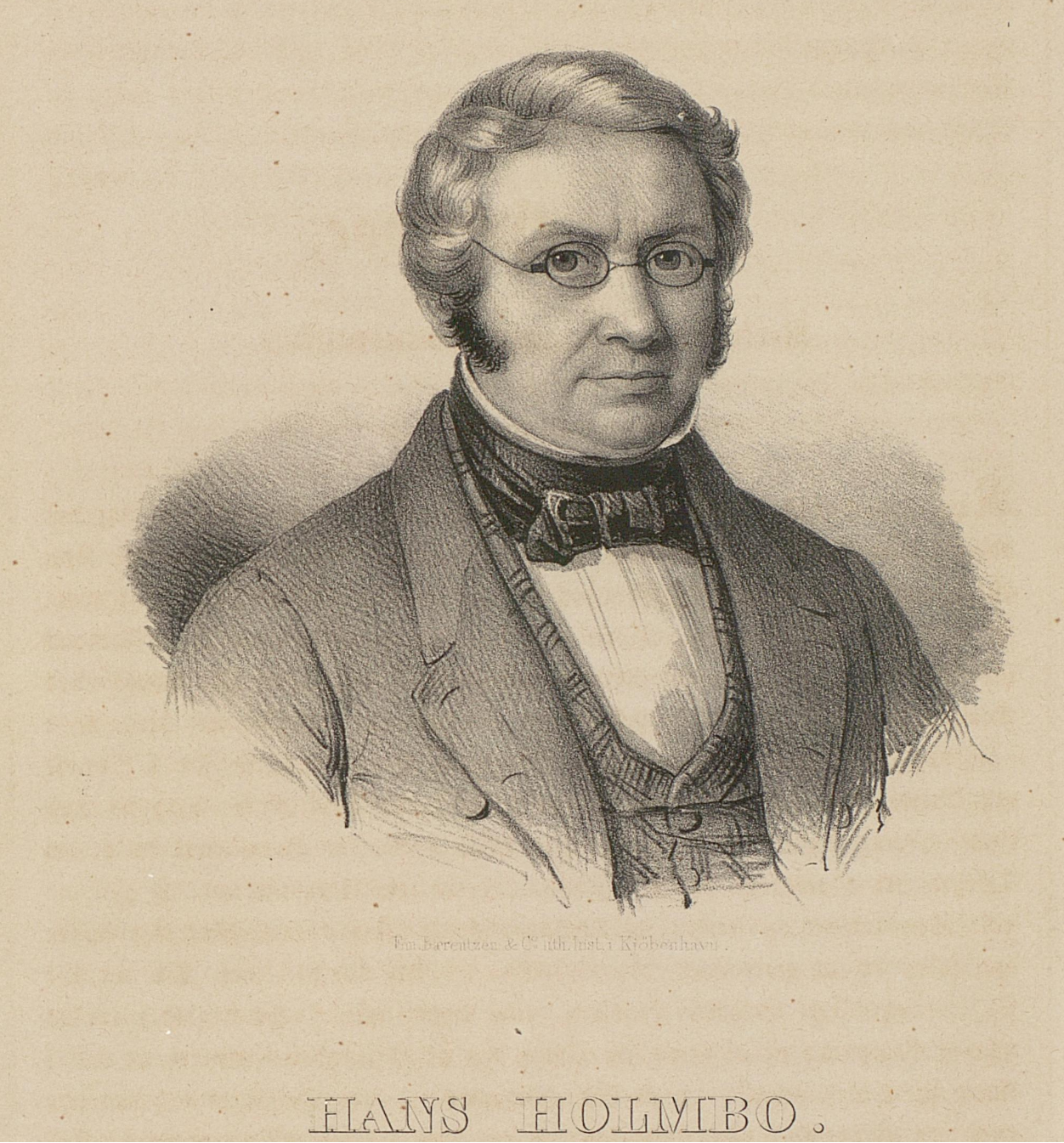
- 1853 lithograph of Holmboe

Member of Storting for Bergen
- In office 183–1865

Personal details
- Born: 8 October 1798 Trondenes, Norway
- Died: 23 May 1868 (aged 69) Sande, Vestfold, Norway
- Spouse: Welgjerd Løberg (m. 1825)
- Relations: Even Holmboe (brother); Leonhard Holmboe (brother); Jens Holmboe (nephew)
- Children: 7
- Parent: Jens Holmboe (father)

Hans Holmboe (8 October 1798 – 23 May 1868) was a Norwegian educator and politician.

== Personal life ==
He was born in Trondenes as the son of bailiff Jens Holmboe (1752–1804) and his wife Anna Margrethe Irgens (1766–1851). He had several brothers and sisters. His brothers Even and Leonhard Christian became involved in politics, so did his nephew Jens Holmboe.

In 1825, he married Welgjerd Endriette Løberg, who hailed from Kongsberg. The couple had four daughters and three sons.

== Career ==
He was elected to the Norwegian Parliament in 1833, representing the constituency of Bergen. He was re-elected in 1836, 1842, 1848, 1851, 1859 and 1862. He was especially known for his work with Henrik Wergeland and others to grant Jews the right to enter Norway.

He worked as a school principal at Bergen Cathedral School. He was also editor-in-chief of Bergens Stiftstidende for some time.

He died on 23 May 1868, aged 69, in Sande.
