= Leonhard Christian Borchgrevink Holmboe =

Norwegian politician (1802–1887)

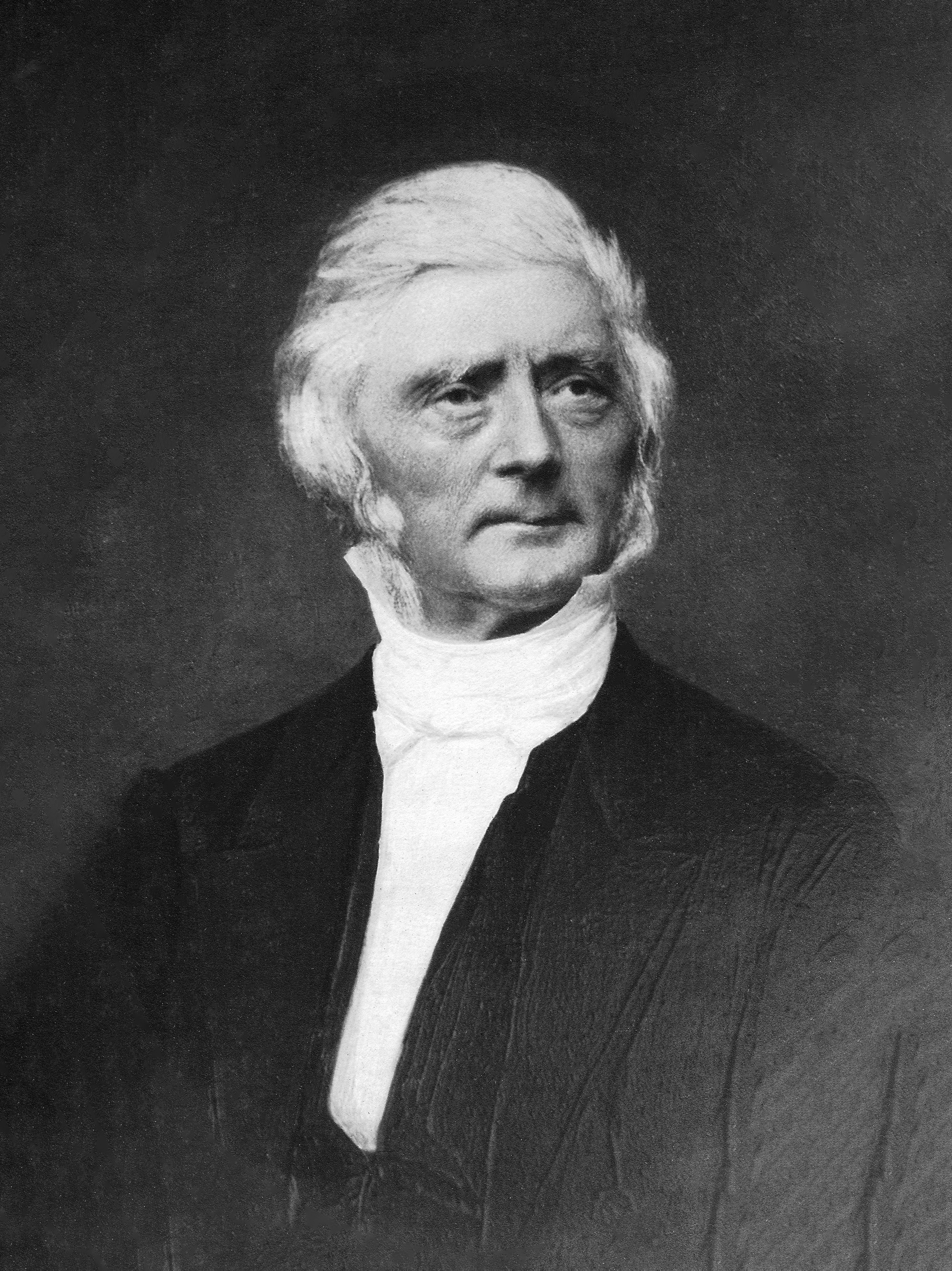

Member of Storting for Finmarkens Amt
- In office 1842–?

Member of Storting for Nordlands Amt
- In office 1836–1842

Personal details
- Born: 10 October 1802 Trondenes Municipality, Norway
- Died: 24 September 1887 (aged 84) Kristiania, Norway
- Spouse: Elisabeth Musæus (m. 1828)
- Relations: Cornelius Holmboe (grandson); Even Holmboe (brother); Hans Holmboe (brother); Jens Holmboe (nephew)
- Children: 9
- Parent: Jens Holmboe (father)
- Occupation: Lutheran minister, politician

Leonhard Christian Borchgrevink Holmboe (10 October 1802 – 24 September 1887) was a Norwegian Lutheran minister and politician.

== Personal life ==
He was born on 10 October 1802, in Trondenes Municipality as the son of bailiff Jens Holmboe (1752–1804) and his wife Anna Margrethe Irgens (1766–1851). He had several brothers and sisters. His brothers Even and Hans became involved in politics, so did his nephew Jens Holmboe.

In 1828, he married Elisabeth Musæus, who hailed from Stavanger. The couple had seven sons and two daughters. Their grandson Cornelius Holmboe was Minister of Justice in 1928.

== Career ==
He was elected to the Norwegian Parliament in 1836, representing the constituency of Nordlands Amt. He was elected again in 1842, representing the constituency of Finmarkens Amt. (which at that time included both the present-day Finnmark and Troms counties)

He worked as a minister, being appointed as vicar in Buksnes Municipality in 1827, dean in Tromsøe in 1839 and vicar in Jevnaker Municipality in 1860.

He died on 24 September 1887, aged 84, in Kristiania.
