= Alvdal =

Alvdal may also refer to:

== Places ==
- Alvdal Municipality, a municipality in Innlandet county, Norway.
- Alvdal (village), a village within Alvdal Municipality in Innlandet county, Norway
- Alvdal Church, a church in Alvdal Municipality in Innlandet county, Norway
- Alvdal Station, a railway station in the village of Alvdal in Innlandet county, Norway

== Other ==
- Alvdal IL, a sports team from Alvdal Municipality in Innlandet county, Norway

== See also ==
- Älvdalen Municipality, a similarly spelled location in Sweden
