= Jonsmoen =

Jonsmoen is a surname. Notable people with the surname include:

- Ola Jonsmoen (born 1932), Norwegian educator, poet, novelist, and children's writer
- Unni-Lise Jonsmoen (born 1936), Norwegian illustrator and children's writer, wife of Ola
- Roald Jonsmoen (born 1967), small Australian author of Norwegian Heritage
