= 1988 Norwegian Second Division =

2. divisjon
- Season: 1988
- Champions: Viking; Mjølner
- Promoted: Viking; Start; Mjølner
- Relegated: Kvik Halden; Haugar; Odd; Alvdal; Skarp; Sunndal

The 1988 2. divisjon was a Norwegian second-tier football league season.

The league was contested by 24 teams, divided into two groups; A and B. The winners of group A and B were promoted to the 1989 1. divisjon. The second placed teams met the 10th position finisher in the 1. divisjon in a qualification round where the winner was promoted to 1. divisjon. The bottom three teams in both groups were relegated to the 3. divisjon.

== Overview ==
=== Summary ===
Viking won group A with 45 points and Mjølner won group B with 53 points. Both teams promoted to the 1989 1. divisjon. The second-placed teams, Start and HamKam met Bryne in the promotion play-offs. Start won the qualification and was promoted to the 1. divisjon.

== Tables ==
=== Group A ===
Pos	Team	Pld	W	D	L	GF	GA	GD	Pts	Promotion, qualification or relegation
1	Viking (C, P)	22	14	3	5	56	25	+31	45	Promotion to First Division
2	Start (O, P)	22	14	2	6	53	27	+26	44	Qualification for the promotion play-offs
3	Eik	22	12	4	6	48	30	+18	40	
4	Lyn	22	11	4	7	54	35	+19	37	
5	Fyllingen	22	9	7	6	36	30	+6	34	
6	Fredrikstad	22	9	6	7	35	35	0	33	
7	Drøbak/Frogn	22	9	5	8	37	39	−2	32	
8	Vidar	22	8	5	9	53	47	+6	29	
9	Vard	22	7	5	10	26	31	−5	26	
10	Kvik Halden (R)	22	7	2	13	29	60	−31	23	Relegation to Third Division
11	Haugar (R)	22	4	2	16	17	62	−45	14	Relegation to Third Division
12	Odd (R)	22	2	7	13	19	42	−23	13	Relegation to Third Division

Source: rsssf.no
Rules for classification: 1) points; 2) goal difference; 3) number of goals scored.
(C) Champions; (O) Play-off winners; (P) Promoted; (R) Relegated

=== Group B ===
Pos	Team	Pld	W	D	L	GF	GA	GD	Pts	Promotion, qualification or relegation
1	Mjølner (C, P)	22	16	5	1	49	13	+36	53	Promotion to First Division
2	HamKam	22	14	5	3	42	25	+17	47	Qualification for promotion play-offs
3	Aalesund	22	14	3	5	55	35	+20	45	
4	Mjøndalen	22	12	3	7	34	28	+6	39	
5	Strindheim	22	9	4	9	41	41	0	31	
6	Bodø/Glimt	22	9	3	10	41	37	+4	30	
7	Faaberg	22	8	5	9	33	33	0	29	
8	Strømsgodset	22	7	3	12	24	37	−13	24	
9	Namsos	22	6	3	13	38	49	−11	21	
10	Alvdal (R)	22	6	3	13	23	41	−18	21	Relegation to Third Division
11	Skarp (R)	22	5	4	13	20	44	−24	19	Relegation to Third Division
12	Sunndal (R)	22	5	1	16	29	46	−17	16	Relegation to Third Division

Source: rsssf.no
Rules for classification: 1) points; 2) goal difference; 3) number of goals scored.
(C) Champions; (P) Promoted; (R) Relegated

== Promotion play-offs ==
=== Results ===
- Start – HamKam 2–1
- HamKam – Bryne 2–1
- Djerv 1919 – Start 1–3

Start won the qualification round and won promotion to the 1. divisjon.

=== Play-off table ===
Pos	Team	Pld	W	D	L	GF	GA	GD	Pts	Promotion or relegation
1	Start (O, P)	2	2	0	0	5	2	+3	4	Promotion to First Division
2	HamKam	2	1	0	1	3	3	0	2	
3	Bryne (R)	2	0	0	2	2	5	−3	0	Relegation to Second Division

Source: rsssf.no
Rules for classification: 1) points; 2) goal difference; 3) number of goals scored.
(O) Play-off winners; (P) Promoted; (R) Relegated
