= Plassmoen =

Village in Alvdal Municipality, Norway

Plassmoen Plassen
- Village
- Interactive map of Plassmoen; Plassen
- Location within Innlandet Location within Norway
- Coordinates: 62°07′31″N 10°33′54″E
- Country: Norway
- Region: Eastern Norway
- County: Innlandet
- District: Østerdalen
- Municipality: Alvdal Municipality
- Elevation: 493 m (1,617 ft)
- Time zone: UTC+01:00 (CET)
  - Summer (DST): UTC+02:00 (CEST)
- Post Code: 2560 Alvdal

Plassmoen or Plassen is a small village in Alvdal Municipality in Innlandet county, Norway. The village is located about 5 kilometres (3.1 mi) west of the village of Alvdal. The village lies near the confluence of the rivers Folla and Sølna, just west of where the river Folla joins the large river Glåma. The population of the village in 2015 was 197.
