= Storsølnkletten =

Mountain in Innlandet, Norway

- Store Sølnkletten / Sølnkletten (unofficial)
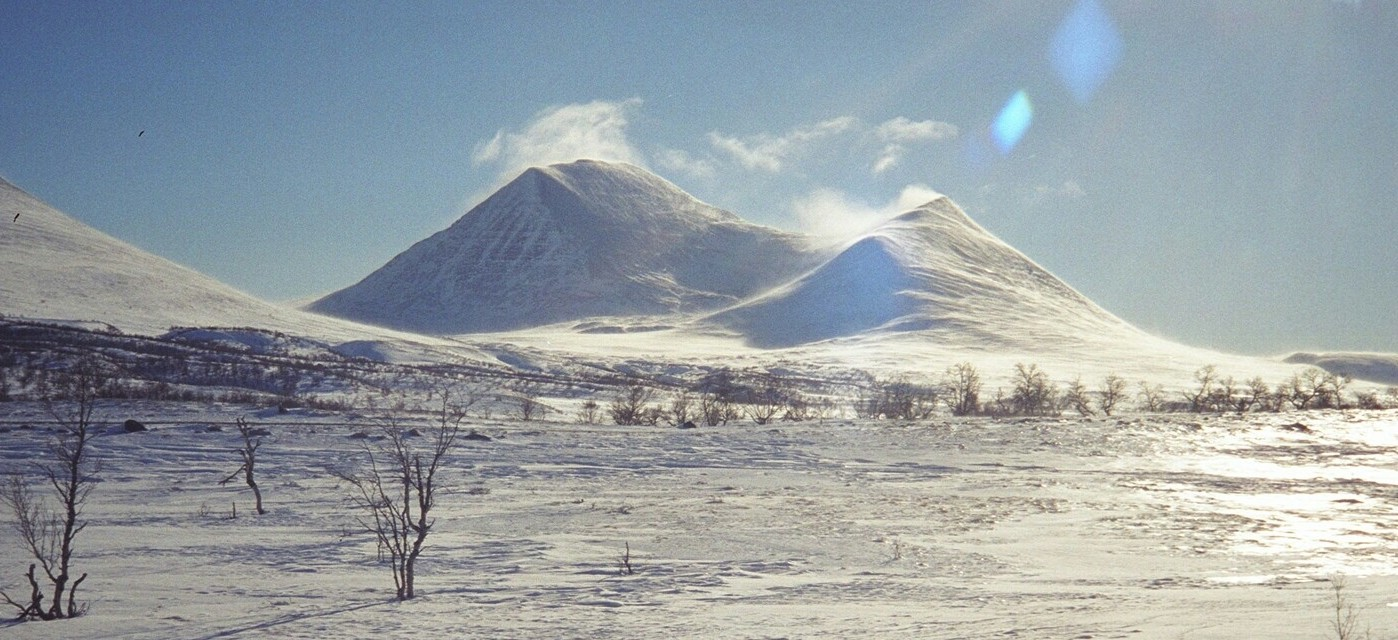
- Storsølnkletten (left) seen from the north

Highest point
- Elevation: 1,827 m (5,994 ft)
- Prominence: 1,047 m (3,435 ft)
- Isolation: 19.3 km (12.0 mi)
- Coordinates: 61°58′48″N 10°17′34″E

Geography
- Interactive map of the mountain
- Location: Innlandet, Norway
- Topo map(s): 1519 II Folldal and 1818 IV Atnsjøen

Climbing
- Easiest route: Easy scrambling

Storsølnkletten is a prominent mountain in Alvdal Municipality in Innlandet county, Norway. The 1,827-metre (5,994 ft) tall mountain lies about 20 kilometres (12 mi) southwest of the village of Alvdal.

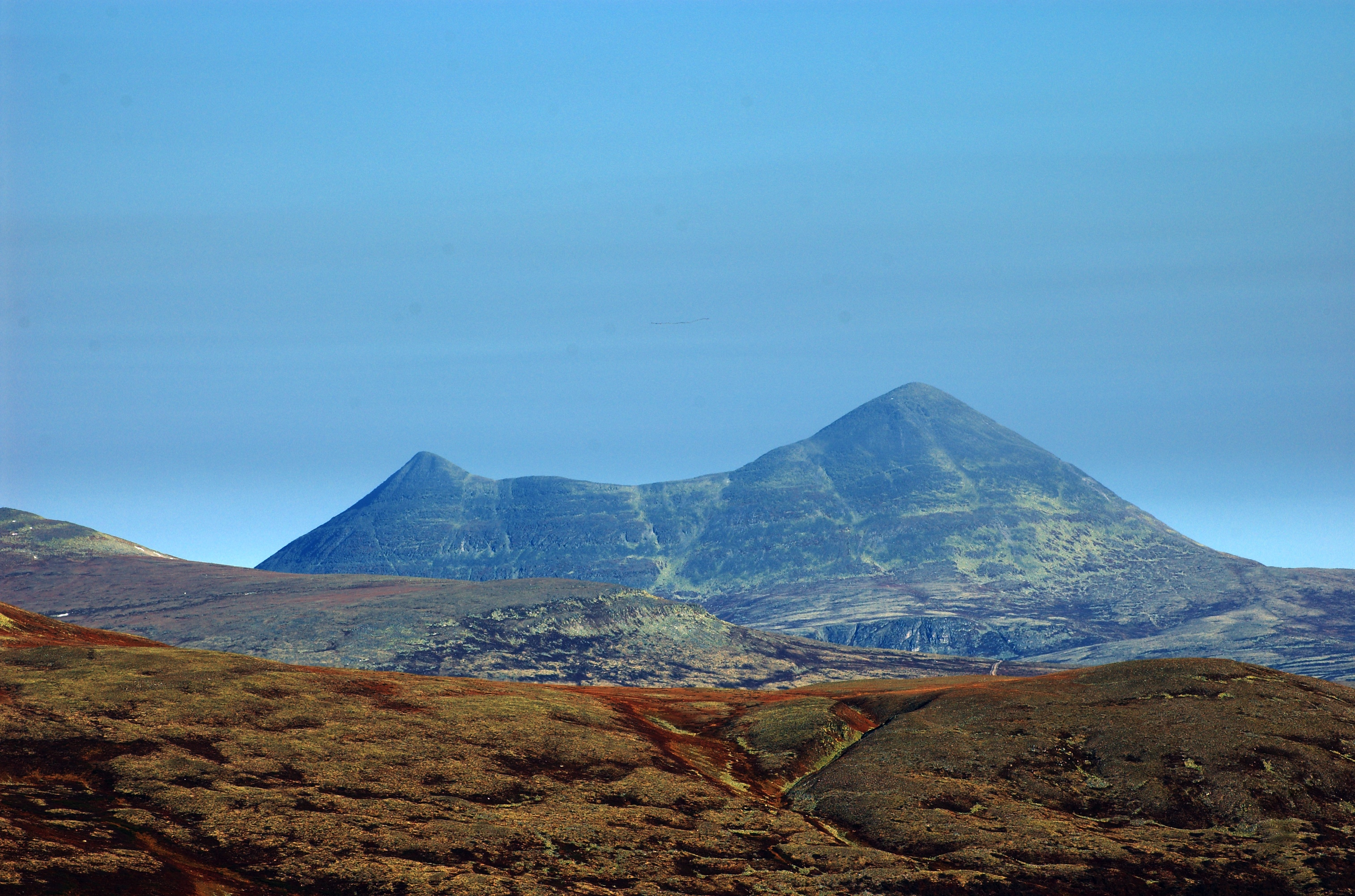
Seen from southwest.

The mountain is easily recognizable due to its saddle form with two peaks. The higher summit (to the southeast) reaches an elevation of 1,827 metres (5,994 ft) and the lower summit (to the northwest) has an elevation of 1,690 metres (5,540 ft). The lower summit is known as Spisskletten or Storsølnkletten lille.

== See also ==
- List of mountains of Norway
