= Anne Nørdsti =

Norwegian singer

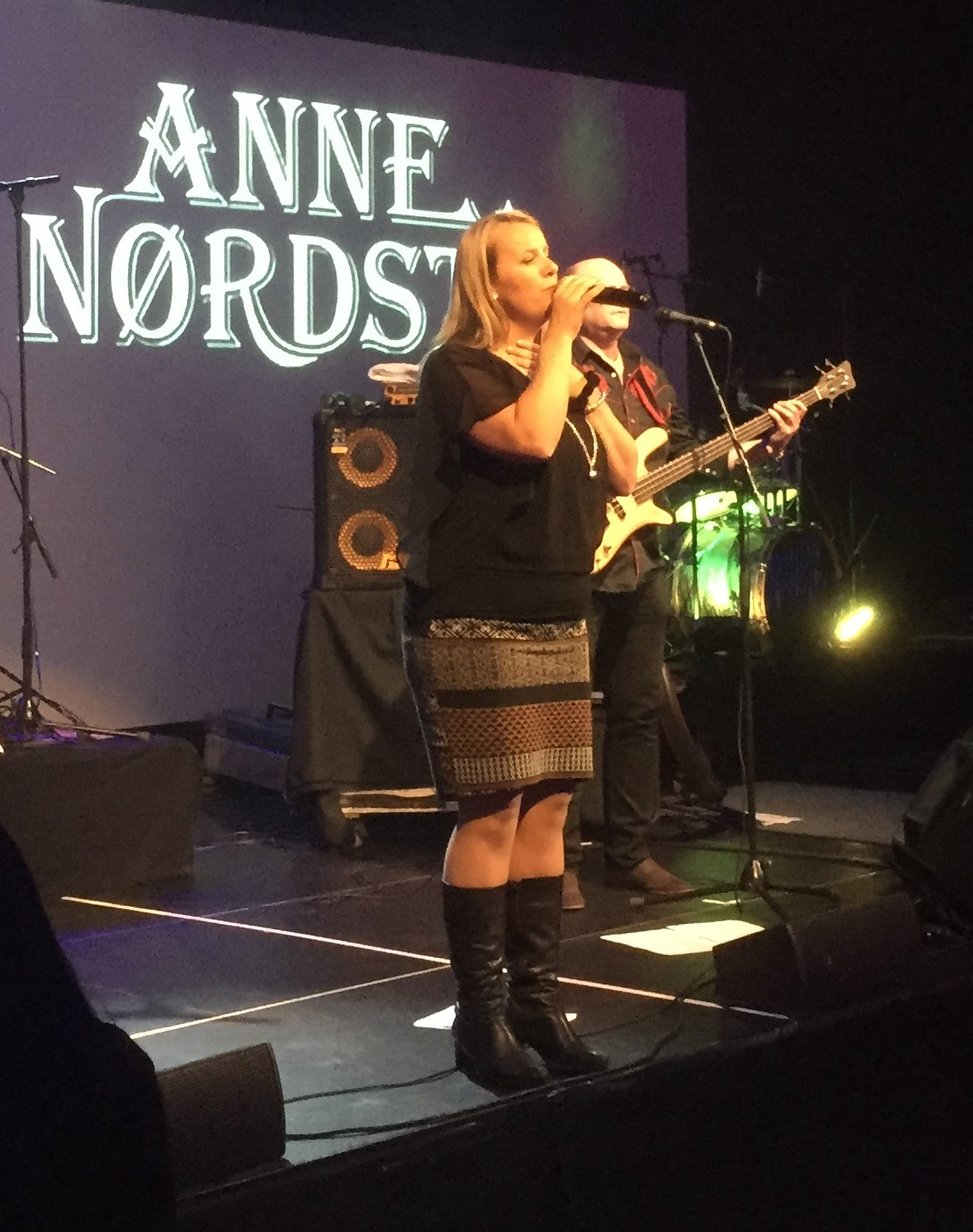
- Nørdsti performing in 2017

Background information
- Born: June 19, 1977 (age 48); Alvdal, Norway
- Origin: Ottestad, Norway
- Genres: country, dansband music
- Occupation: Singer

Anne Nørdsti (born in Alvdal on June 19, 1977) residing in Ottestad is a Norwegian singer in the dansband genre, influenced by country music.

She started as a vocalist in Kolbus, a dansband. Then launching a solo career, she has released seven albums, with debut being Bygdeliv in 2004 in the danseband genre. First five albums were on Tylden & Co., but she changed labels and her sixth album Så gøtt... appeared on Mariann Records Norge.

In 2007, she won Spellemannprisen award in the Dance orchestra category" for her 2007 album for the album Livli'

Her Anne Nørdstis Band is composed of Bjørn Løvås on guitar, Stein Tore Sønsteli on keyboard, Per Erik Pedersen on bass and Finn Andresen on drums.

== Discography ==
- 2004: Bygdeliv
- 2005: Bonderomantikk
- 2006: Her vil jeg bo
- 2007: Livli'
- 2009: Livet er nå
- 2011: Så gøtt...
- 2012: På kryss og tvers
- 2014: Danser I Måneskinn
