= Jutulhogget =

Jutulhogget may refer to

- Jutulhogget (Hedmark), a canyon in Alvdal and Rendalen, Norway
- Jutulhogget (Oppland), a canyon in Rondane, Norway
- Jutulhogget (Antarctica), a peak of Jutulsessen in Queen Maud Land
