= Siv Tørudbakken =

Norwegian politician (born 1968)

Siv Tørudbakken (born 25 May 1968) is a Norwegian politician for the Labour Party.

Following the 2007 Norwegian local elections she became the new leader (fylkesrådsleder) of Hedmark county cabinet, making her the first woman to hold this office. Tørudbakken has since 1995 held a variety of full-time political offices in the Hedmark county council.

Political offices
Preceded by Reidar Åsgård	County cabinet leader of Hedmark; 2007–2010	Succeeded by Svein Borkhus
