= Olov Grøtting =

Norwegian politician (born 1960)

Olov Grøtting (born 14 September 1960) is a Norwegian politician for the Centre Party.

She was born in Alvdal Municipality as a daughter of farmers. After finishing her secondary education at the school in Tynset in 1979, she worked in tourism and also studied at Hedmark University College. After a hiatus from higher education she took the master's degree in public administration at the University of Karlstad in 2004.

Grøtting was elected to the municipal council for Alvdal Municipality in 1999, served four years, and later returned in 2007 to serve as mayor until 2011. In 2009 she also became deputy leader of Hedmark Centre Party.

She served as a deputy representative to the Parliament of Norway from Hedmark during the terms 2009–2013 and 2013–2017. She became a full member of Parliament in 2012, when Trygve Slagsvold Vedum was appointed to cabinet. She remained such until the cabinet where Vedum was a member, Stoltenberg's Second Cabinet lost office in October 2013.
