= 1989 Norwegian Third Division =

Norwegian football league season

The 1989 3. divisjon, the third highest association football league for men in Norway.

22 games were played in 5 groups and 18 games were played in 1 group, 3 points given for wins and 1 for draws. Sprint/Jeløy, Sandefjord, Kristiansund, Os , Hødd and Skarp were promoted to the 2. divisjon. The three worst placed teams in each group were relegated to the 4. divisjon, except the best performing team finishing third to last.

== League tables ==
=== Group A ===
| Pos | Team | Pld | W | D | L | GF | GA | GD | Pts | Promotion or relegation |
|---|---|---|---|---|---|---|---|---|---|---|
| 1 | Sprint/Jeløy (P) | 22 | 15 | 1 | 6 | 53 | 35 | +18 | 46 | Promotion to Second Division |
| 2 | Ullern | 22 | 12 | 8 | 2 | 49 | 20 | +29 | 44 | |
| 3 | Selbak | 22 | 12 | 4 | 6 | 51 | 28 | +23 | 40 | |
| 4 | Askim | 22 | 12 | 4 | 6 | 43 | 29 | +14 | 40 | |
| 5 | Lørenskog | 22 | 12 | 3 | 7 | 50 | 43 | +7 | 39 | |
| 6 | Asker | 22 | 10 | 2 | 10 | 40 | 38 | +2 | 32 | |
| 7 | Grei | 22 | 7 | 7 | 8 | 45 | 39 | +6 | 28 | |
| 8 | Sarpsborg | 22 | 7 | 7 | 8 | 44 | 43 | +1 | 28 | |
| 9 | Bjørkelangen | 22 | 7 | 5 | 10 | 29 | 37 | −8 | 26 | |
| 10 | Kvik Halden (R) | 22 | 5 | 4 | 13 | 36 | 57 | −21 | 19 | Relegation to Fourth Division |
| 11 | Jevnaker (R) | 22 | 4 | 3 | 15 | 30 | 62 | −32 | 15 | Relegation to Fourth Division |
| 12 | Sørumsand (R) | 22 | 3 | 4 | 15 | 13 | 52 | −39 | 13 | Relegation to Fourth Division |

(P) Promoted; (R) Relegated

=== Group B ===
| Pos | Team | Pld | W | D | L | GF | GA | GD | Pts | Promotion or relegation |
|---|---|---|---|---|---|---|---|---|---|---|
| 1 | Sandefjord (P) | 22 | 15 | 4 | 3 | 61 | 21 | +40 | 49 | Promotion to Second Division |
| 2 | Fram Larvik | 22 | 14 | 5 | 3 | 55 | 24 | +31 | 47 | |
| 3 | Donn | 22 | 13 | 6 | 3 | 46 | 27 | +19 | 45 | |
| 4 | Ørn-Horten | 75 | 13 | 4 | 58 | 61 | 29 | +32 | 43 | |
| 5 | Jerv | 22 | 12 | 2 | 8 | 48 | 38 | +10 | 38 | |
| 6 | Odd | 22 | 9 | 4 | 9 | 49 | 32 | +17 | 31 | |
| 7 | Mercantile | 22 | 9 | 2 | 11 | 28 | 43 | −15 | 29 | |
| 8 | Kjelsås | 22 | 8 | 2 | 12 | 33 | 51 | −18 | 26 | |
| 9 | Ready | 22 | 7 | 4 | 11 | 35 | 38 | −3 | 25 | |
| 10 | Langesund (R) | 22 | 6 | 1 | 15 | 31 | 51 | −20 | 19 | Relegation to Fourth Division |
| 11 | Vigør (R) | 22 | 4 | 3 | 15 | 23 | 71 | −48 | 15 | Relegation to Fourth Division |
| 12 | Stokke (R) | 22 | 1 | 5 | 16 | 23 | 68 | −45 | 8 | Relegation to Fourth Division |

(P) Promoted; (R) Relegated

=== Group C ===
| Pos | Team | Pld | W | D | L | GF | GA | GD | Pts | Promotion or relegation |
|---|---|---|---|---|---|---|---|---|---|---|
| 1 | Kristiansund (P) | 22 | 14 | 5 | 3 | 47 | 23 | +24 | 47 | Promotion to Second Division |
| 2 | Elverum | 22 | 14 | 2 | 6 | 51 | 29 | +22 | 44 | |
| 3 | Nybergsund | 22 | 11 | 5 | 6 | 43 | 29 | +14 | 38 | |
| 4 | Raufoss | 22 | 12 | 2 | 8 | 37 | 27 | +10 | 38 | |
| 5 | Skeid | 22 | 10 | 3 | 9 | 34 | 36 | −2 | 33 | |
| 6 | Alvdal | 22 | 8 | 8 | 6 | 30 | 27 | +3 | 32 | |
| 7 | Åndalsnes | 22 | 8 | 7 | 7 | 34 | 31 | +3 | 31 | |
| 8 | KIL/Hemne | 22 | 8 | 5 | 9 | 30 | 42 | −12 | 29 | |
| 9 | Sunndal | 22 | 6 | 9 | 7 | 32 | 26 | +6 | 27 | |
| 10 | Kolbotn (R) | 22 | 6 | 5 | 11 | 22 | 32 | −10 | 23 | Relegation to Fourth Division |
| 11 | Nidelv/Falken (R) | 22 | 3 | 4 | 15 | 20 | 55 | −35 | 13 | Relegation to Fourth Division |
| 12 | Røros (R) | 22 | 2 | 5 | 15 | 21 | 44 | −23 | 11 | Relegation to Fourth Division |

(P) Promoted; (R) Relegated

=== Group D ===
| Pos | Team | Pld | W | D | L | GF | GA | GD | Pts | Promotion or relegation |
|---|---|---|---|---|---|---|---|---|---|---|
| 1 | Os (P) | 22 | 14 | 2 | 6 | 45 | 22 | +23 | 44 | Promotion to Second Division |
| 2 | Ulf-Sandnes | 22 | 13 | 2 | 7 | 47 | 27 | +20 | 41 | |
| 3 | Ålgård | 22 | 11 | 4 | 7 | 36 | 31 | +5 | 37 | |
| 4 | Figgjo | 22 | 11 | 3 | 8 | 42 | 35 | +7 | 36 | |
| 5 | Klepp | 22 | 9 | 6 | 7 | 44 | 37 | +7 | 33 | |
| 6 | Haugar | 22 | 9 | 6 | 7 | 41 | 37 | +4 | 33 | |
| 7 | Fana | 22 | 9 | 4 | 9 | 34 | 45 | −11 | 31 | |
| 8 | Randaberg | 22 | 7 | 6 | 9 | 32 | 31 | +1 | 27 | |
| 9 | Lyngbø | 22 | 6 | 6 | 10 | 20 | 34 | −14 | 24 | |
| 10 | Skjold (Note: Skjold was not relegated due to being the best team placed in 10th position.) | 22 | 7 | 3 | 12 | 22 | 37 | −15 | 24 | |
| 11 | Ny-Krohnborg (R) | 22 | 7 | 2 | 13 | 22 | 37 | −15 | 23 | Relegation to Fourth Division |
| 12 | Staal (R) | 22 | 4 | 6 | 12 | 16 | 28 | −12 | 18 | Relegation to Fourth Division |

(P) Promoted; (R) Relegated

=== Group E ===
| Pos | Team | Pld | W | D | L | GF | GA | GD | Pts | Promotion or relegation |
|---|---|---|---|---|---|---|---|---|---|---|
| 1 | Hødd (P) | 22 | 17 | 3 | 2 | 70 | 11 | +59 | 54 | Promotion to Second Division |
| 2 | Steinkjær | 22 | 15 | 2 | 5 | 48 | 31 | +17 | 47 | |
| 3 | Volda | 22 | 13 | 5 | 4 | 54 | 26 | +28 | 44 | |
| 4 | Stjørdals/Blink | 22 | 12 | 4 | 6 | 42 | 26 | +16 | 40 | |
| 5 | Stryn | 22 | 10 | 2 | 10 | 29 | 31 | −2 | 32 | |
| 6 | Eid | 22 | 8 | 7 | 7 | 32 | 26 | +6 | 31 | |
| 7 | Nessegutten | 22 | 7 | 7 | 8 | 40 | 39 | +1 | 28 | |
| 8 | Brattvåg | 22 | 8 | 3 | 11 | 25 | 33 | −8 | 27 | |
| 9 | Hareid | 22 | 7 | 3 | 12 | 21 | 49 | −28 | 24 | |
| 10 | Spjelkavik (R) | 22 | 5 | 3 | 14 | 19 | 49 | −30 | 18 | Relegation to Fourth Division |
| 11 | Verdal (R) | 22 | 4 | 3 | 15 | 29 | 63 | −34 | 15 | Relegation to Fourth Division |
| 12 | Langevåg (R) | 22 | 3 | 4 | 15 | 35 | 60 | −25 | 13 | Relegation to Fourth Division |

(P) Promoted; (R) Relegated

=== Group F ===
| Pos | Team | Pld | W | D | L | GF | GA | GD | Pts | Promotion or relegation |
|---|---|---|---|---|---|---|---|---|---|---|
| 1 | Skarp (P) | 18 | 12 | 3 | 3 | 38 | 16 | +22 | 39 | Promotion to Second Division |
| 2 | Narvik/Nor | 18 | 12 | 2 | 4 | 46 | 21 | +25 | 38 | |
| 3 | Fauske/Sprint | 18 | 11 | 2 | 5 | 46 | 34 | +12 | 35 | |
| 4 | Stålkameratene | 18 | 8 | 3 | 7 | 27 | 28 | −1 | 27 | |
| 5 | Mosjøen | 18 | 8 | 2 | 8 | 27 | 32 | −5 | 26 | |
| 6 | Tromsdalen | 18 | 7 | 2 | 9 | 29 | 23 | +6 | 23 | |
| 7 | Andenes | 18 | 7 | 2 | 9 | 39 | 36 | +3 | 23 | |
| 8 | Gevir (R) | 18 | 7 | 2 | 9 | 27 | 41 | −14 | 23 | Relegation to Fourth Division |
| 9 | Ulfstind (R) | 18 | 4 | 1 | 13 | 19 | 41 | −22 | 13 | Relegation to Fourth Division |
| 10 | Lyngen (R) | 18 | 4 | 1 | 13 | 17 | 43 | −26 | 13 | Relegation to Fourth Division |

(P) Promoted; (R) Relegated
