= Harald Stormoen (footballer) =

Norwegian footballer (born 1980)

Personal information
- Full name: Harald Stormoen
- Date of birth: 6 October 1980 (age 46)
- Place of birth: Alvdal, Norway
- Height: 1.81 m (5 ft 11 1/2 in)
- Position: Midfielder

Senior career*
Years	Team	Apps	(Gls)
–1997	Alvdal		
1998–2007	Kongsvinger	189	(18)
2008–2010	Sogndal	27	(0)
- * Club domestic league appearances and goals

Harald Stormoen (born 6 October 1980) is a retired Norwegian footballer, that played for Kongsvinger and Sogndal as a midfielder.

== Career ==
Stormoen was born in Alvdal Municipality and played for Alvdal IL while also playing for Norwegian youth national teams. He joined Kongsvinger IL in 1998, and played in the Norwegian Premier League in 1998 and 1999, before the team was relegated. Stormoen played a total of 189 league games for the club.

Stormoen joined second-tier team Sogndal in ahead of the 2008 season. After playing 27 matches for the club in the First Division, Stormoen decided to retire after the 2010 season.
