= Unni-Lise Jonsmoen =

Norwegian illustrator and children's writer (1936–2026)

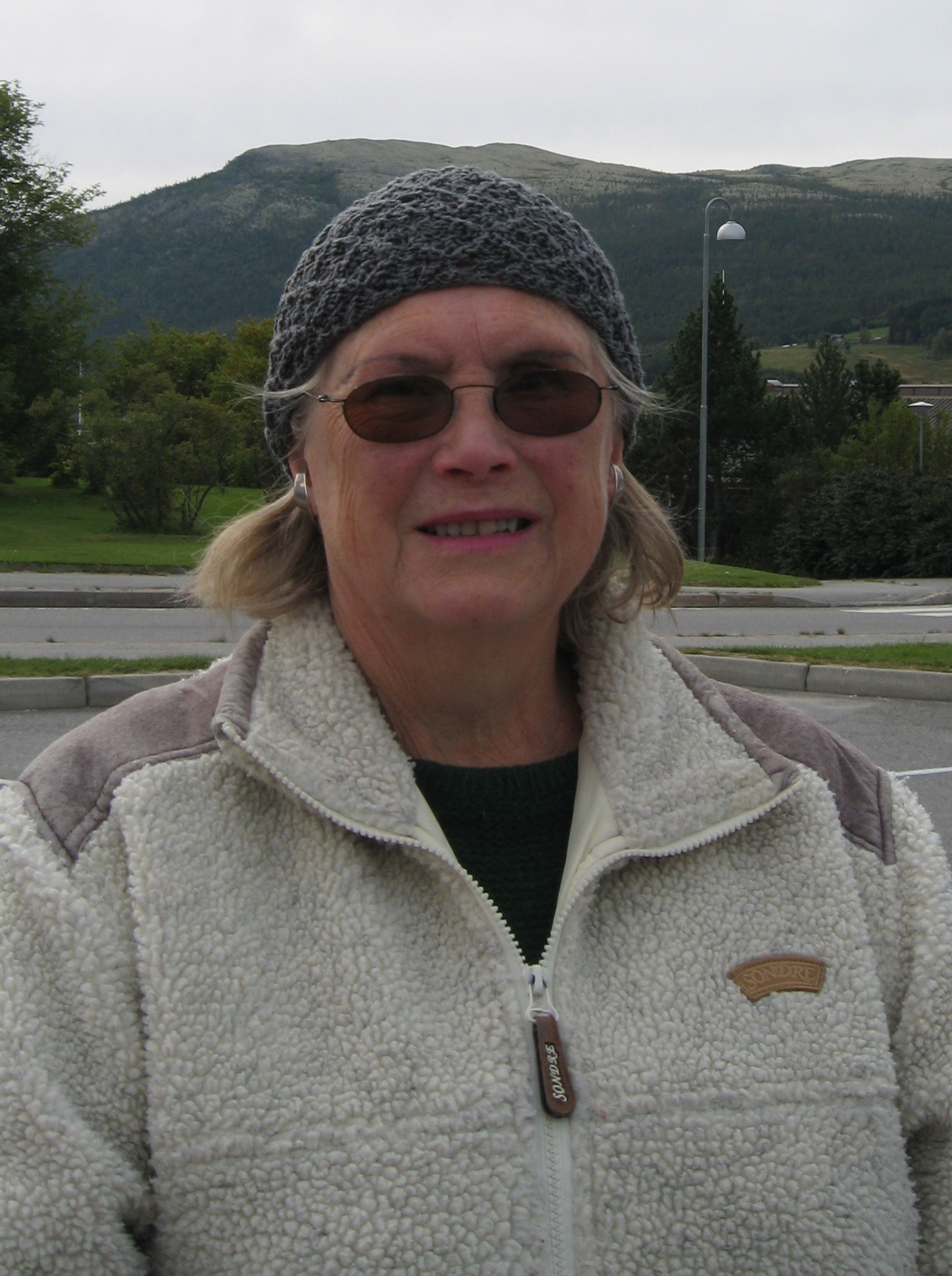
- Jonsmoen in 2007
- Born: 21 April 1936; Oslo, Norway
- Died: 3 March 2026 (aged 89)
- Education: Norwegian National Academy of Craft and Art Industry
- Occupations: Illustrator, children's writer
- Spouse: Ola Jonsmoen

Unni-Lise Jonsmoen (21 April 1936 – 3 March 2026) was a Norwegian illustrator and children's writer.

== Background ==
Jonsmoen was born in Oslo on 21 April 1936, to Margit Schulze and Rolf Martin Hansen. She was married to children's writer Ola Jonsmoen, and the couple settled in Alvdal.

Jonsmoen died on 3 March 2026, at the age of 89.

== Career ==
Jonsmoen was educated at the Norwegian National Academy of Craft and Art Industry. Her children's book illustrations include Det hendte i Taremareby (1960, text by Ingebrigt Davik), Singeling for rare ting (1961, text by Ola Jonsmoen), and Humle Brumle (1962, text by Ola Jonsmoen). She was awarded the Ministry of Culture's Illustration Prize in 1960, 1961, 1965 and 1966. In addition to children's books, she has also illustrated poetry collections and textbooks. Her own books include Svarttrosten som forsov seg (1979), Lars og Ola på tytingtur (1980), and Kjenner du fru Frodig? (1982).

In 2017 she issued the autobiographical book Lukket dør.

She was awarded Hedmark County Municipality's Cultural Prize in 1989, jointly with her husband Ola Jonsmoen.
