= Subnational parliamentary system in Norway =

The parliamentary system is a part of the Constitution of Norway (§ 15), regarding the national level of administration and how the political executive branch should be formed. From the 1980s it has been used on the subnational levels as well; on the local (in municipalities) as well as regional level (in county municipalities).

== Local level ==
Locally, the parliamentary system is used in Norway's two largest municipalities: Oslo Municipality (the capital city) and Bergen Municipality. In practice, it has meant the forming of a new institution, the city government (Norwegian: et byråd). In line with the parliamentary principle, this derives from the city council, which is elected in a municipal election. Also, the responsibility of preparing cases and proposals for the city council was transferred to the city government from the city's civic administration, which was headed by the chief administrative officer (Norwegian: rådmann).

The city government institution was introduced in Oslo in 1986 as a test, and later became permanent. Oslo was said to be the first, and for many years only, city in Europe with a parliamentary system. Bergen followed in 2000. It has been proposed in Norway's third largest municipality, Trondheim Municipality, but it has not happened. It has also been proposed in smaller municipalities like Askøy Municipality, Kristiansand Municipality, Skien Municipality, Harstad Municipality and Tromsø Municipality.

A member of the city government is called city commissioner (Norwegian: en byråd), and the city government is led by a chairperson (Norwegian: byrådsleder).

Chairs of the city government of Oslo
  - 1986–1989 : Hans Svelland
  - 1989–1992 : Michael Tetzschner
  - 1992–1997 : Rune Gerhardsen
  - 1997–2000 : Fritz Huitfeldt
  - 2000–2009 : Erling Lae
  - 2009–2015 : Stian Berger Røsland
  - 2015–present : Raymond Johansen
Chairs of the city government of Bergen
  - 2000–2003 : Anne-Grete Strøm-Erichsen
  - 2003–2013 : Monica Mæland
  - 2013–2014 : Ragnhild Stolt-Nielsen
  - 2014–2015 : Martin Smith-Sivertsen
  - 2015–2019 : Harald Schjelderup
  - 2019–2022 : Roger Valhammer
  - 2022–present : Rune Bakervik

== Regional level ==
A parliamentary system is used in the county municipalities of Hedmark, Nordland, Nord-Trøndelag, Troms—in addition to Oslo, which is both a municipality and a county. Nordland introduced the institution in 1999, and Troms, Hedmark and Nord-Trøndelag followed in 2003. The possibility was also researched by Vestfold in the 1990s, and it has been proposed in several counties, including Rogaland, Akershus, Sør-Trøndelag and Hordaland.

Similarly to the local level, the county government is called et fylkesråd. The leader is called fylkesrådsleder, and a cabinet member is called en fylkesråd. This must not be confused with the position fylkerådsmann, the chief administrative officer of the county municipality.

Chairs of the county government of Hedmark
  - 2003–2007 : Reidar Åsgård
  - 2007–2010 : Siv Tørudbakken
  - 2010–2011 : Svein Borkhus
  - 2011–present : Njål S. Føsker
Chairs of the county government of Nordland
  - 2000–2006 : Geir Knutson
  - 2006–present : Odd Eriksen
Chairs of the county government of Nord-Trøndelag
  - 2003–2011 : Alf Daniel Moen
  - 2011–present : Ingvild Kjerkol
Chairs of the county government of Troms
  - 2003–2009 : Paul Dahlø
  - 2009–present : Pia Svensgaard
