= Per Gunnar Dalløkken =

Norwegian footballer (born 1965)

Personal information
- Date of birth: 28 January 1965 (age 61)
- Position: Midfielder

Senior career*
Years	Team	Apps	(Gls)
- Folldal IL
–1985	Alvdal IL		
1986–1996	Kongsvinger	185	(6)
- * Club domestic league appearances and goals

Per Gunnar Dalløkken (born 28 January 1965) is a retired Norwegian football midfielder.

He started his career in Folldal IL, and then played for Alvdal IL. He signed for Kongsvinger IL just after the 1985 season. He played only 2 Norwegian Premier League in 1986, but was then ever-present in the seasons 1988, 1990, 1991, 1992 and 1995. He retired ahead of the 1997 season.
