= Ottestad Church =

Church in Innlandet, Norway

- Ottestad kirke
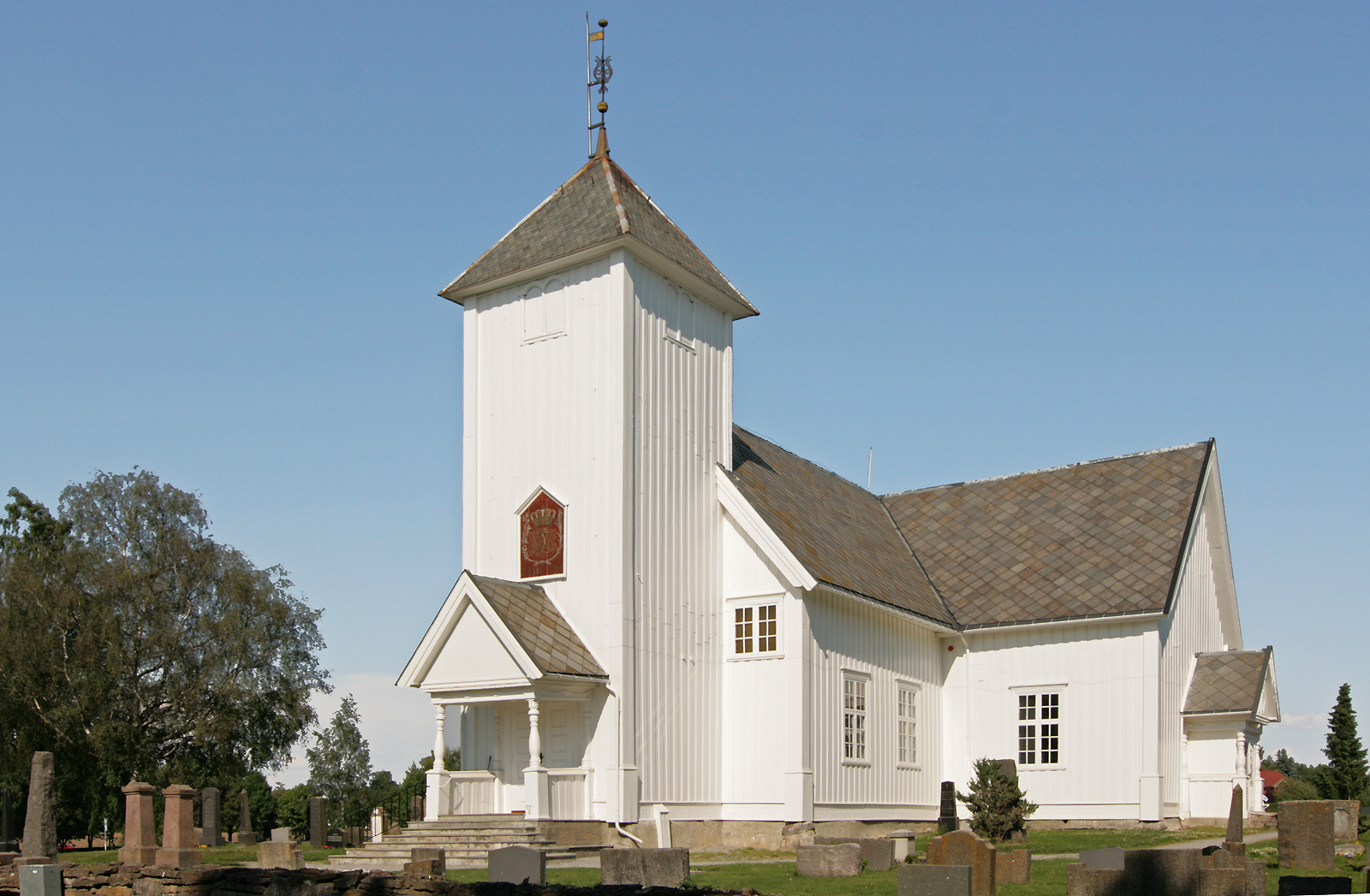
- View of the church
- Ottestad Church
- 60°45′26″N 11°08′41″E
- Location: Stange Municipality, Innlandet
- Country: Norway
- Denomination: Church of Norway
- Previous denomination: Catholic Church
- Churchmanship: Evangelical Lutheran

History
- Status: Parish church
- Founded: 13th century
- Consecrated: 17 January 1731

Architecture
- Functional status: Active
- Architect: Even Baardset
- Architectural type: Cruciform
- Completed: 1731 (295 years ago)

Specifications
- Capacity: 350
- Materials: Wood

Administration
- Diocese: Hamar bispedømme
- Deanery: Hamar domprosti
- Parish: Ottestad
- Norwegian Cultural Heritage Site
- Type: Church
- Status: Automatically protected
- ID: 85254

Ottestad Church (Norwegian: Ottestad kirke; historic: Óttarstaða kirkja) is a parish church of the Church of Norway in Stange Municipality in Innlandet county, Norway. It is located in the village of Ottestad. It is the church for the Ottestad parish which is part of the Hamar domprosti (deanery) in the Diocese of Hamar. The white, wooden church was built in a cruciform design in 1731 using plans drawn up by the architect Even Baardset. The church seats about 350 people.

== History ==
The earliest existing historical records of the church date back to the mid-13th century when it was mentioned in the book Hákonar saga Hákonarsonar as Óttarstaða kirkja near Hamar. This church was a wooden stave church that was likely built during the early 13th century. Not much is known about this old building. This building was located on a different site, about 200 metres (660 ft) to the southwest of the present church site. By the early 1600s, the church was described as being "dilapidated and old-fashioned". Around the year 1627, the old church was torn down and a new church was built on the same site. The church tower was built in 1630. The church didn't take long to fall into disrepair and by the early 1700s, the church was already rotting and beginning to fall apart. Also, the parish council determined that the church was not built at a good location and set out to find a new location nearby for the church. In 1730, a new church was built about 200 metres (660 ft) to the northeast of the old church site. The new church was a half-timbered cruciform building that was built by Even Baardset who modeled the church after the Our Saviour's Church in Christiania. The new church was consecrated on 17 January 1731.

== Media gallery ==
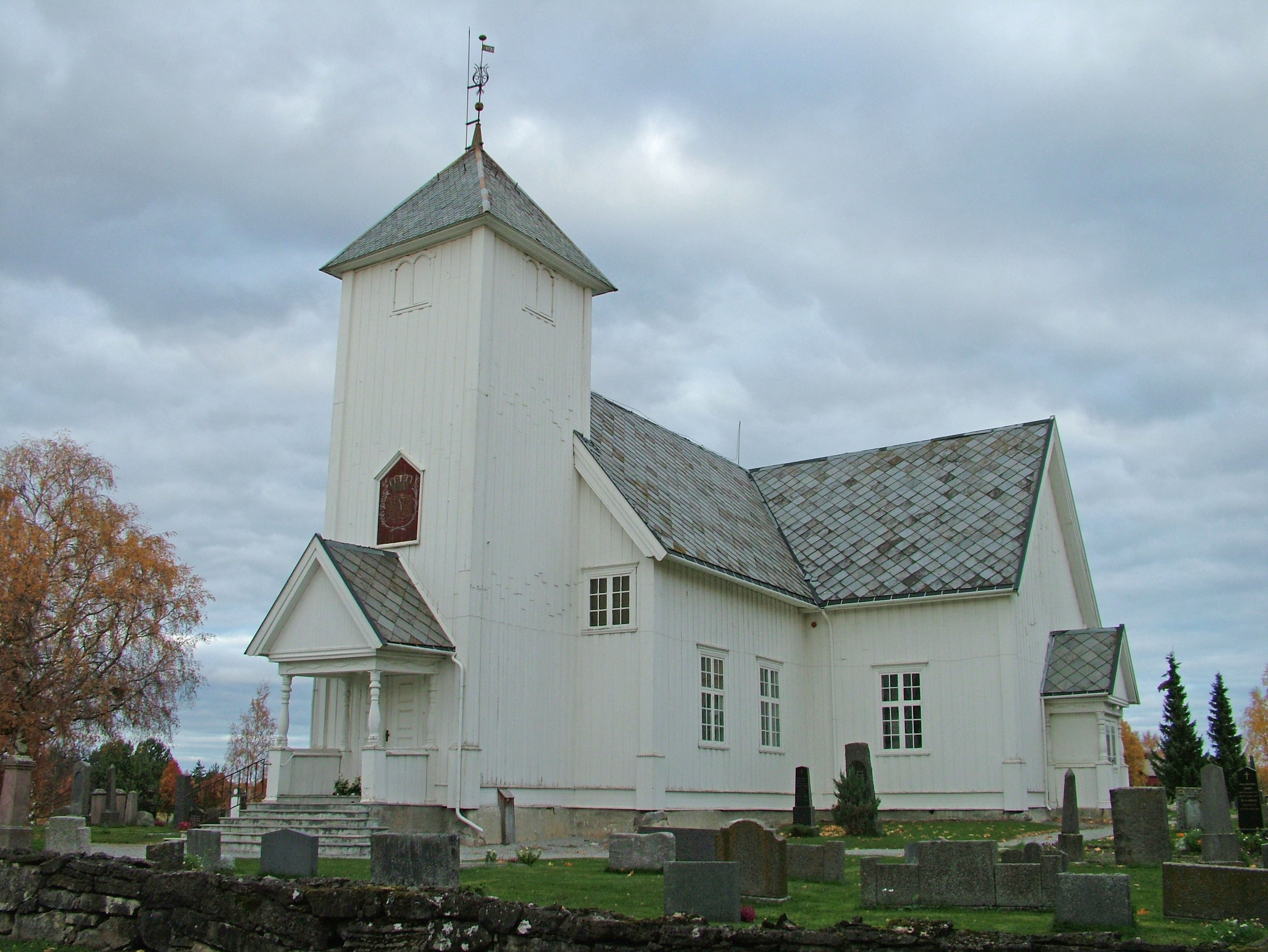

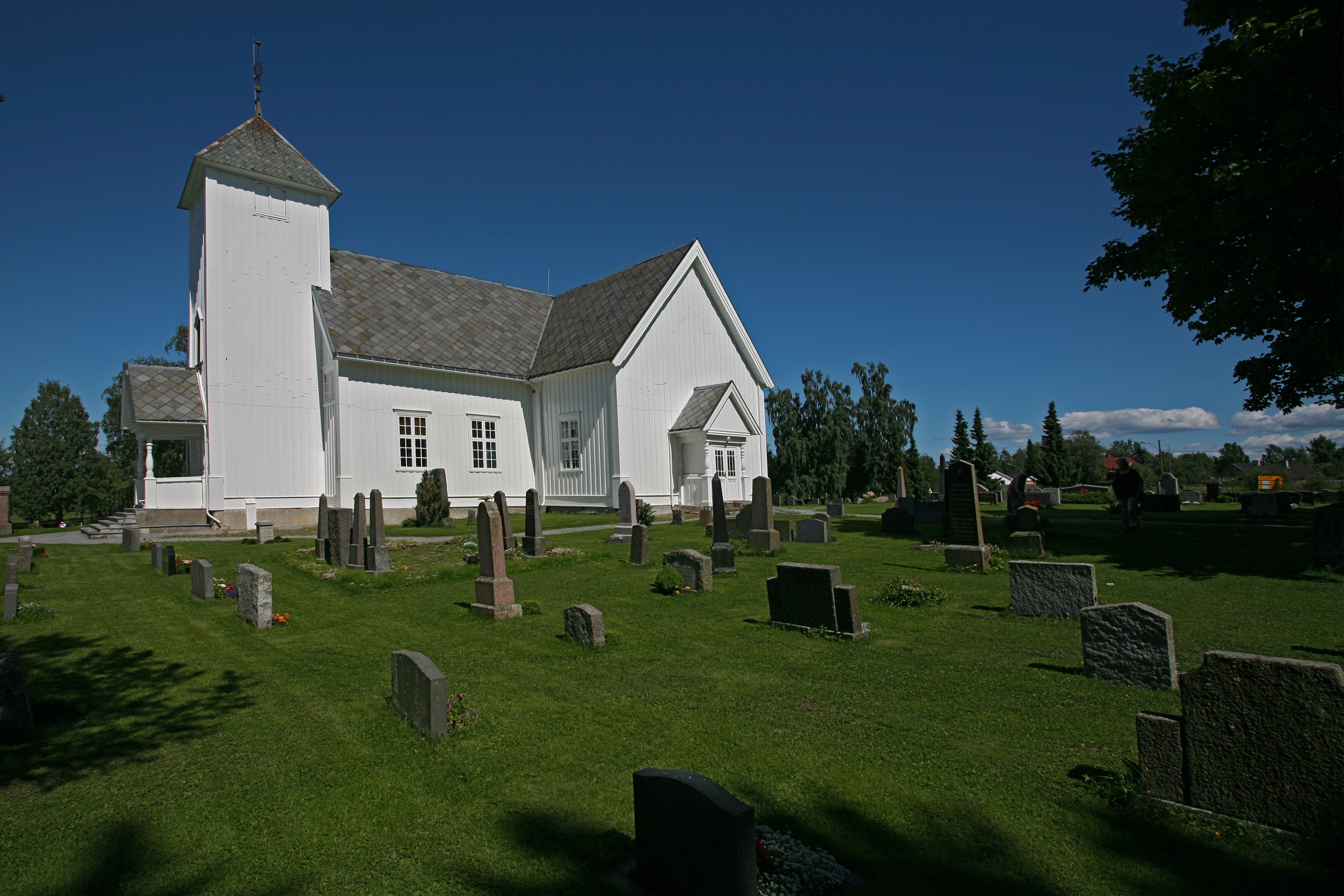

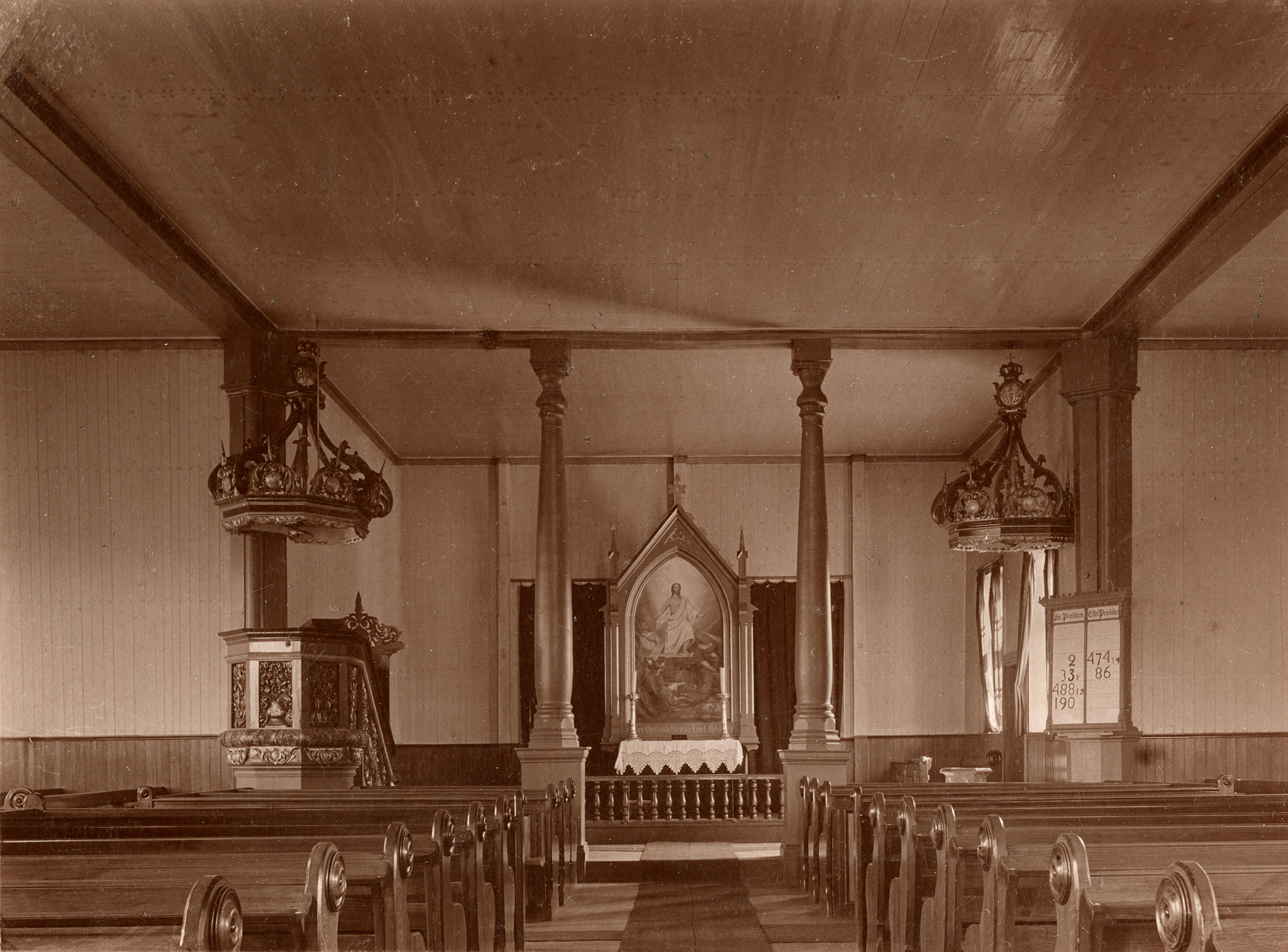

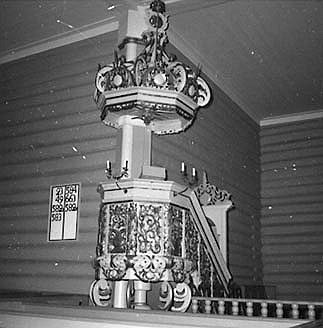

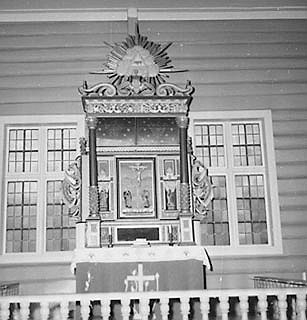

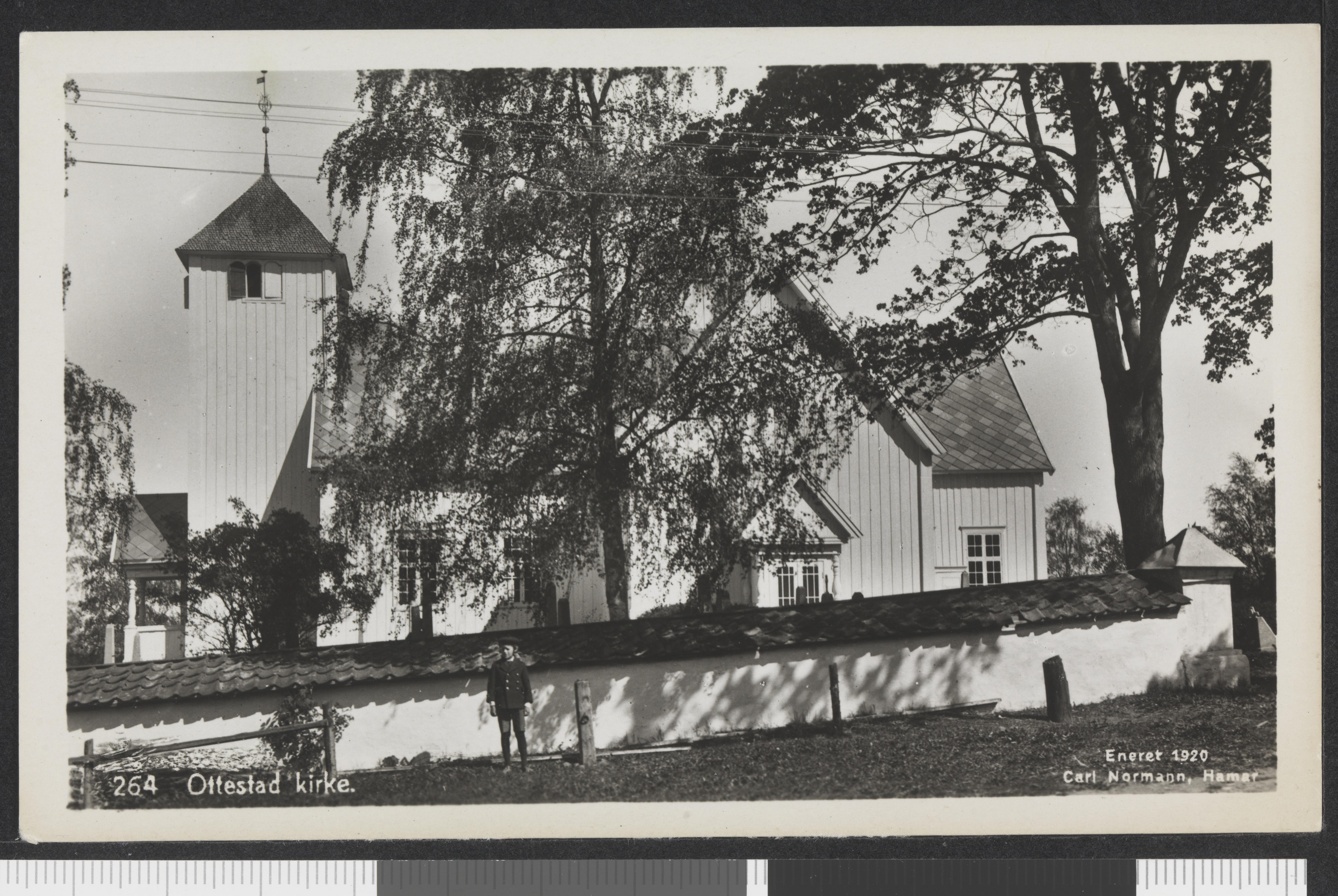

== See also ==
- List of churches in Hamar
