= Svein Borkhus =

Norwegian politician (born 1955)

Svein Borkhus (born 21 November 1955) is a Norwegian politician for the Labour Party.

He hails from a farm in Dalholen in Folldal Municipality. He became elected to the municipal council of Alvdal Municipality in 1987, joined the executive committee in 1991, served as deputy mayor from 1995 to 1999 and mayor from 1999 to 2007. He was also a member of Hedmark county council from 2003 to 2007. From 2007 to 2010 he was a member of the county cabinet, and from 2010 to 2011 he chaired the county cabinet. In 2011 he again became mayor of Alvdal Municipality.

Political offices
Preceded by Siv Tørudbakken	County cabinet leader of Hedmark; 2010–2011	Succeeded by Njål S. Føsker
