= Alvdal IL =

Norwegian sports club

- Full name: Alvdal Idrettslag
- Founded: 1902
- Ground: Steimoegga, Alvdal
- League: Men: 5. divisjon Trøndelag avd. 4 (tier 6); Women: 4. divisjon Trøndelag avd. 4 (tier 5)
- 2018: Men: 5. divisjon Trøndelag avd. 4 (tier 6), 9th Women: 4. divisjon Trøndelag avd. 4 (tier 5), 5th
Home colours

Alvdal Idrettslag is a Norwegian sports club from Alvdal Municipality, founded in 1902. It has sections for association football, Nordic skiing, biathlon, orienteering, team handball and volleyball.

Famous skiers include Embret Mellesmo, Per Samuelshaug, Ottar Gjermundshaug, Oddmund Jensen, Erling Bjørn, Kristian Bjørn, Per Bjørn and Torgeir Bjørn. The club became Norwegian relay champion in 1958 and 1959. Former football players include Harald Stormoen and Per Gunnar Dalløkken.

== Recent seasons ==
=== Men ===
Season	Level	Division	Section	Position	Movements	Note/ source
1999	Tier 5	4. divisjon	Trøndelag avd. 2	7th/11		
2000	Tier 5	4. divisjon	Trøndelag avd. 1	4th/11		
2001	did not participate					
2002	did not participate					
2003	did not participate					
2004	Tier 6	5. divisjon	Trøndelag avd. 2	3rd/9		As Alvdal IL/Folldal IF
2005	did not participate					
2006	did not participate					
2007	Tier 6	5. divisjon	Trøndelag avd. 10	6th/8		As Alvdal IL/Folldal IF
2008	Tier 6	5. divisjon	Trøndelag avd. 11	1st/6	Promoted	As Alvdal IL/Folldal IF
2009	Tier 5	4. divisjon	Trøndelag avd. 4	3rd/10		
2010	Tier 5	4. divisjon	Trøndelag avd. 4	1st/10	Promoted	
2011	Tier 4	3. divisjon	Trøndelag avd. 10	10th/14		
2012	Tier 4	3. divisjon	Indre Østland avd. 4	9th/14		
2013	Tier 4	3. divisjon	Indre Østland avd. 3	9th/14		
2014	Tier 4	3. divisjon	Trøndelag avd. 10	9th/14		
2015	Tier 4	3. divisjon	Trøndelag avd. 9	11th/14		
2016	Tier 4	3. divisjon	Indre Østland avd. 9	14th/14	Relegated	
2017	Tier 5	4. divisjon	Trøndelag avd. 2	11th/12	Relegated	
2018	Tier 6	5. divisjon	Trøndelag avd. 4	9th/10		

=== Women ===
Season	Level	Division	Section	Position	Movements	Note/ source
2014	Tier 4	3. divisjon	Trøndelag avd. 3	10th/10		As Alvdal IL J19
2015	did not participate					
2016	did not participate					
2017	did not participate					
2018	Tier 5	4. divisjon	Trøndelag avd. 4	5th/11		
