= Ola Jonsmoen =

Norwegian educator, poet, novelist and children's writer

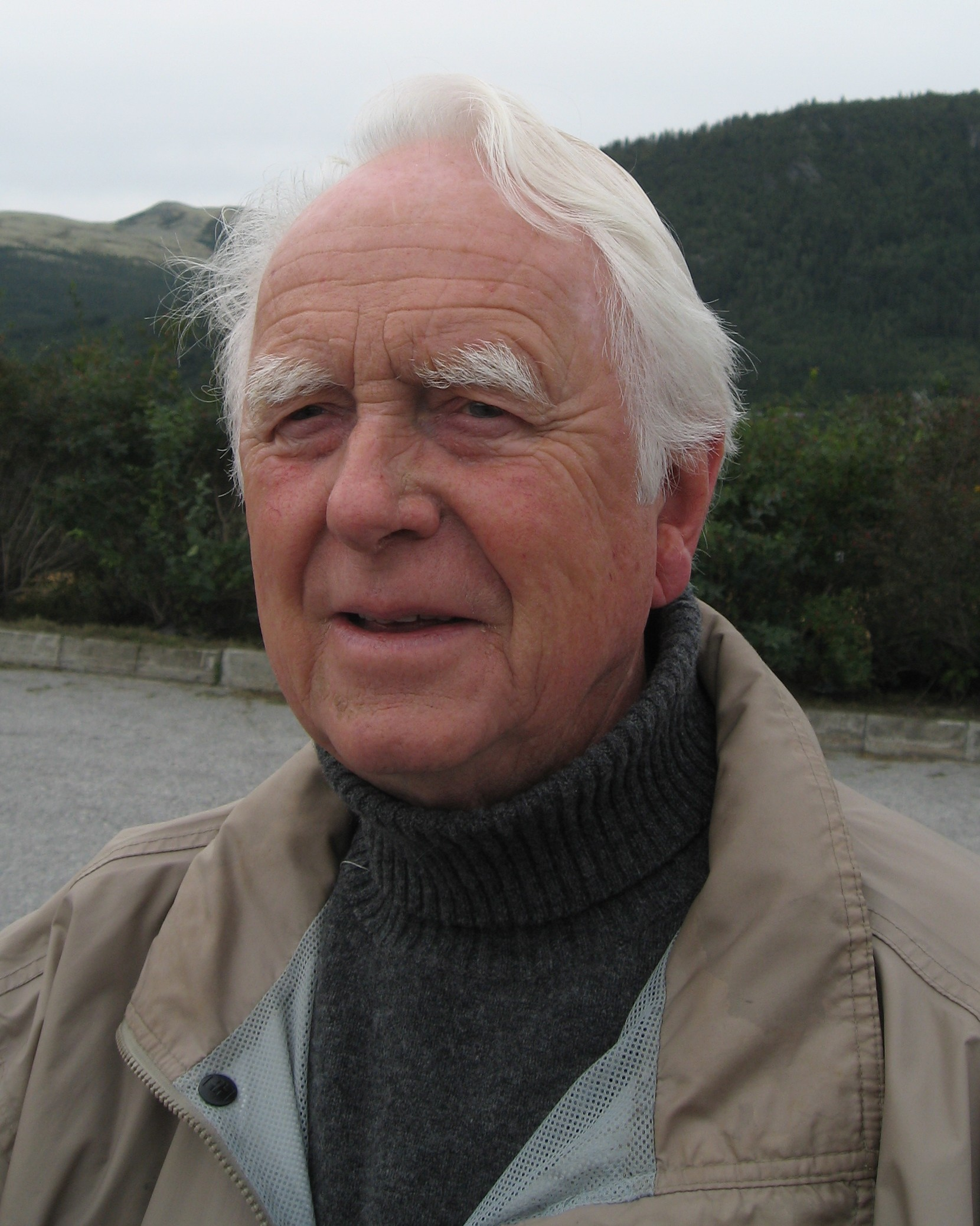
- Born: 9 July 1932 (age 94); Alvdal, Norway
- Occupations: Educator; Poet, novelist and children's writer
- Spouse: Unni-Lise Jonsmoen
- Awards: King's Medal of Merit (2002)

Ola Jonsmoen (born 9 July 1932) is a Norwegian educator, poet, novelist and children's writer.

Jonsmoen was born in Alvdal Municipality. He made his literary debut in 1959 with the poetry collection Dagen, vinden og hjartet. Other collections are Omvegar from 1967, and Om desse steinane tala from 1973. Among his short story collections are Kabalmennesket from 1974 and Endestasjonar from 1990. He published the novel Middagshøgder in 1986, and Nordspor in 1995. His lyrics for children include the collection Humle Brumle from 1962, and among his humorous books are Langpoteta from 1996 and Den store møteboka from 1997.

== Awards ==
Jonsmoen received Austmannaprisen in 1975. He was awarded Hedmark County Municipality's Cultural Prize in 1989, jointly with his wife Unni-Lise Jonsmoen. He received Vinjeprisen in 1991, and Noregs Mållags målpris in 2003. He was awarded the King's Medal of Merit in gold in 2002.
