= Ottestad =

Village in Stange Municipality, Norway

- Village
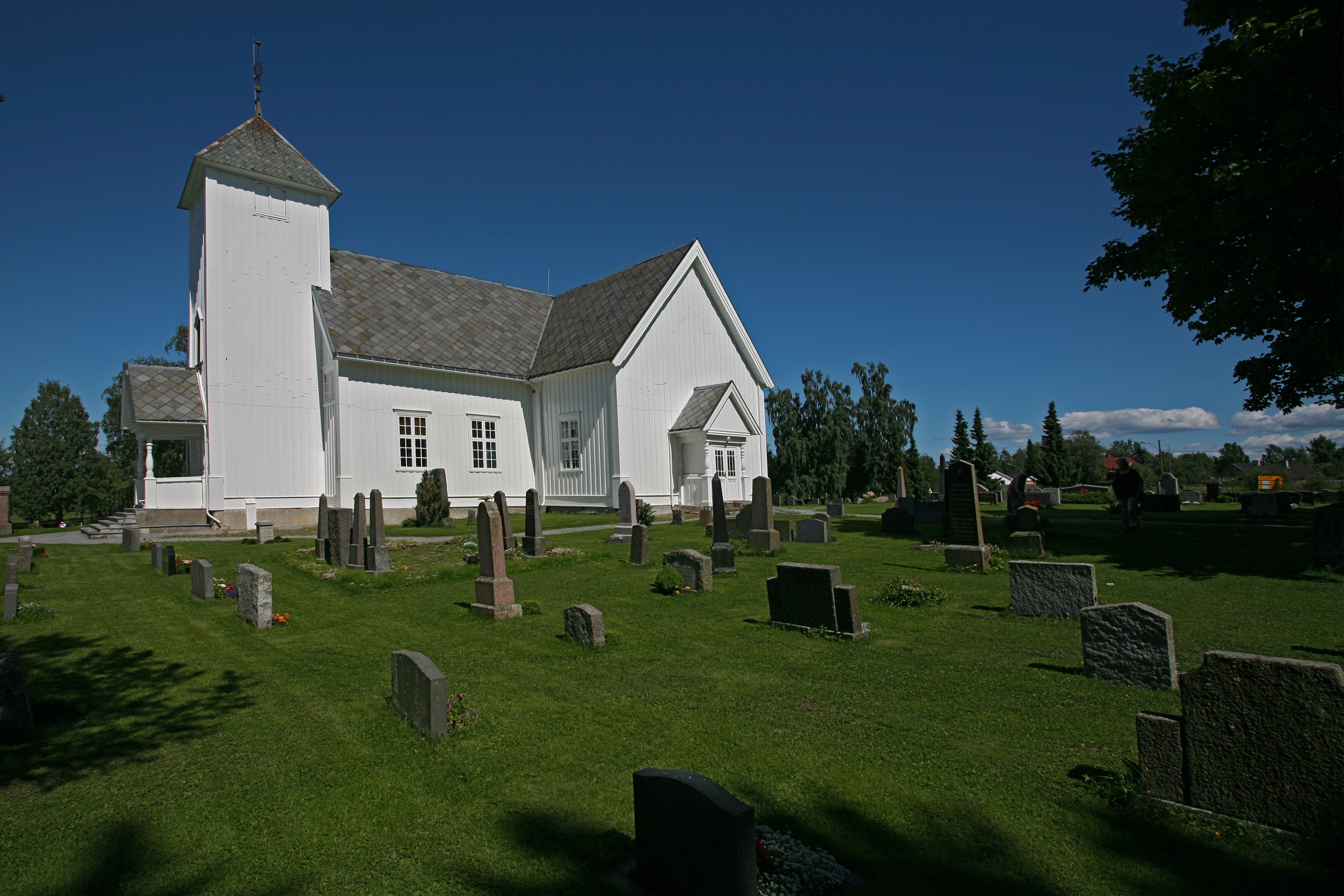
- View of the local village church
- Interactive map of Ottestad
- Location within Innlandet Location within Norway
- Coordinates: 60.74743°N 11.1366°E
- Country: Norway
- Region: Eastern Norway
- County: Innlandet
- District: Hedmarken
- Municipality: Stange Municipality
- Elevation: 185 m (607 ft)
- Time zone: UTC+01:00 (CET)
  - Summer (DST): UTC+02:00 (CEST)
- Post Code: 2312 Ottestad

Ottestad is a village in Stange Municipality in Innlandet county, Norway. The village centre is located about 5 kilometres (3.1 mi) north of the village of Stangebyen and about 2 kilometres (1.2 mi) south of the village of Bekkelaget. The whole northern part of Stange, surrounding the village centre, is often referred to as Ottestad as well. Ottestad Church is located in the village.

Ottestad had a station on the Dovre Line railway until 1983. The station was named "Ottestadbyen". The Migration Museum and Sanderud Psychiatric Hospital are both located in Ottestad.

== Surname ==
Historically, the families who lived on the Ottestad farm took that farm name as their surname. The name is a protected surname in Norway since fewer than 200 people have it. In 2021, there were 197 people living in Norway with Ottestad as their surname.

Notable people with the surname include:

- no:John Ove Ottestad (born 1949), Nrwegian business executive, Executive Vice President of Norsk Hydro from 1 March 2002 to 2009
- Mie Bjørndal Ottestad (born 1997 in Oslo), Norwegian professional racing cyclist
- Per Kristian Ottestad (born 1968 in Stavanger), Norwegian singer, musician, composer, and songwriter
- no:Per Steinar Ottestad (born 1950), Norwegian judoka, who won several gold medals in Norwegian championships
