= Alvdal Church =

Church in Innlandet, Norway

- Alvdal kirke
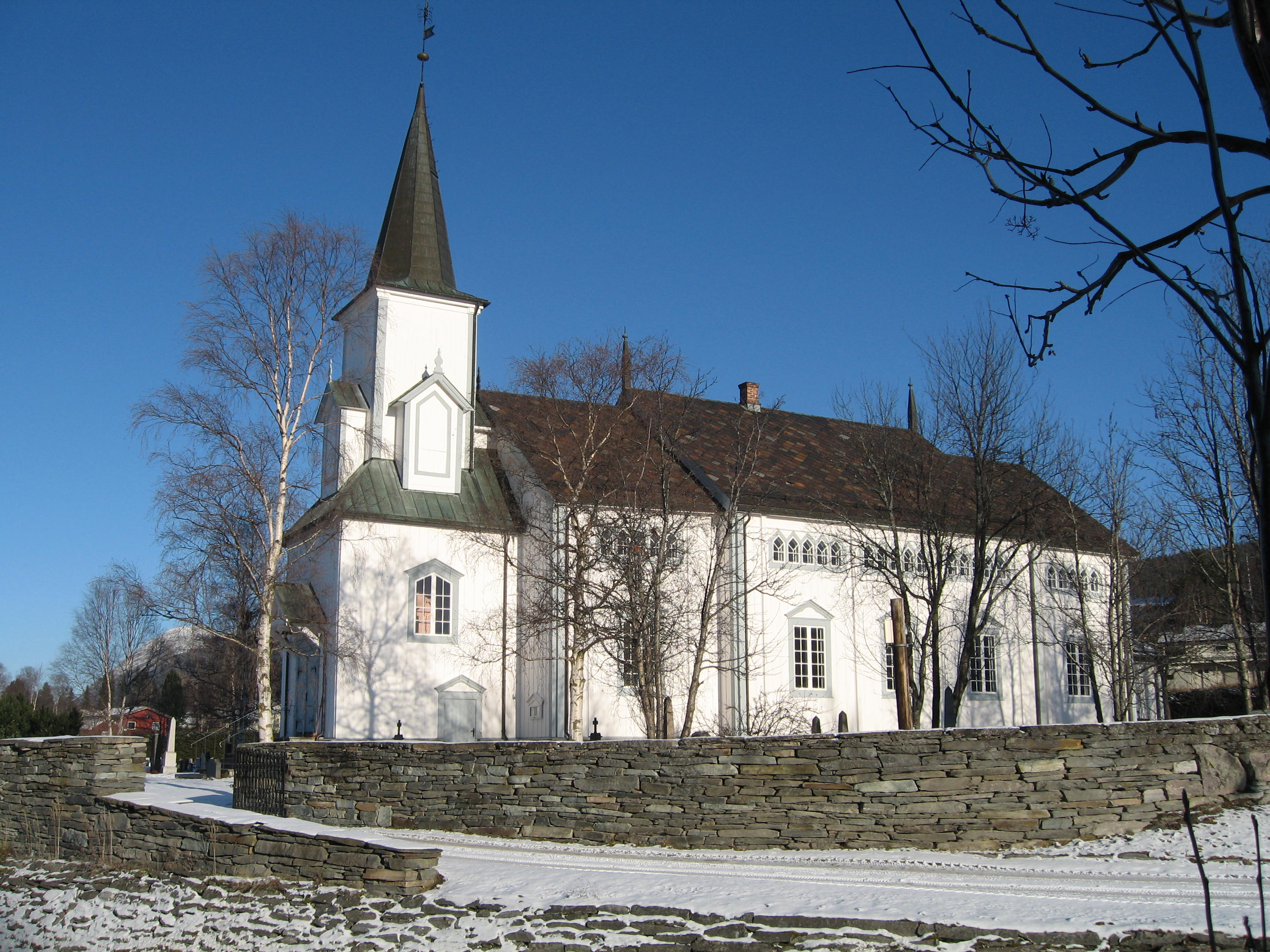
- View of the church
- Alvdal Church
- 62°06′34″N 10°37′49″E
- Location: Alvdal Municipality, Innlandet
- Country: Norway
- Denomination: Church of Norway
- Churchmanship: Evangelical Lutheran

History
- Former name: Lille-Elvdalen Church
- Status: Parish church
- Founded: 1639
- Consecrated: 1861

Architecture
- Functional status: Active
- Architect: Christian Heinrich Grosch
- Architectural type: Long church
- Completed: 1861 (165 years ago)

Specifications
- Capacity: 450
- Materials: Wood

Administration
- Diocese: Hamar bispedømme
- Deanery: Nord-Østerdal prosti
- Parish: Alvdal
- Norwegian Cultural Heritage Site
- Type: Church
- Status: Listed
- ID: 83774

Alvdal Church (Norwegian: Alvdal kirke) is a parish church of the Church of Norway in Alvdal Municipality in Innlandet county, Norway. It is located in the village of Alvdal. It is the church for the Alvdal parish which is part of the Nord-Østerdal prosti (deanery) in the Diocese of Hamar. The white, wooden church was built in a long church design in 1861 using plans drawn up by the architect Christian Heinrich Grosch. The church seats about 450 people.

== History ==
The first church in Alvdal was built in 1639 (there is some circumstantial evidence that a medieval stave church stood here before 1639, but that is not proven). The church from 1639 was a wooden long church that was dedicated to Saint Nicholas. The church was consecrated in 1639 by the Bishop Oluf Boesen. The first church (then known as the Lille-Elvdalen Church) was built by the Randmæl farm, along the river Glomma, about 600 metres (0.4 mi) south of the present site of the church. Prior to the construction of this church, the people of Alvdal travelled to the nearby Tylldalen Church. In 1709, the old church was torn down. From 1709 to 1715, a new, larger timber-framed long church was built on the same site.

From 1855 to 1861, a new wooden long church was built in the village of Alvdal, about 600 metres (0.4 mi) north of the old church site. The new church was designed by Christian Heinrich Grosch. The new church was consecrated on 12 October 1861. After the new church was completed, the old church was torn down. In 1867, the new church got exterior siding and it was painted. In 1882, a new altarpiece was built by Carl Frithjof Smith (before that time, a large wooden cross stood above the altar.

== Media gallery ==
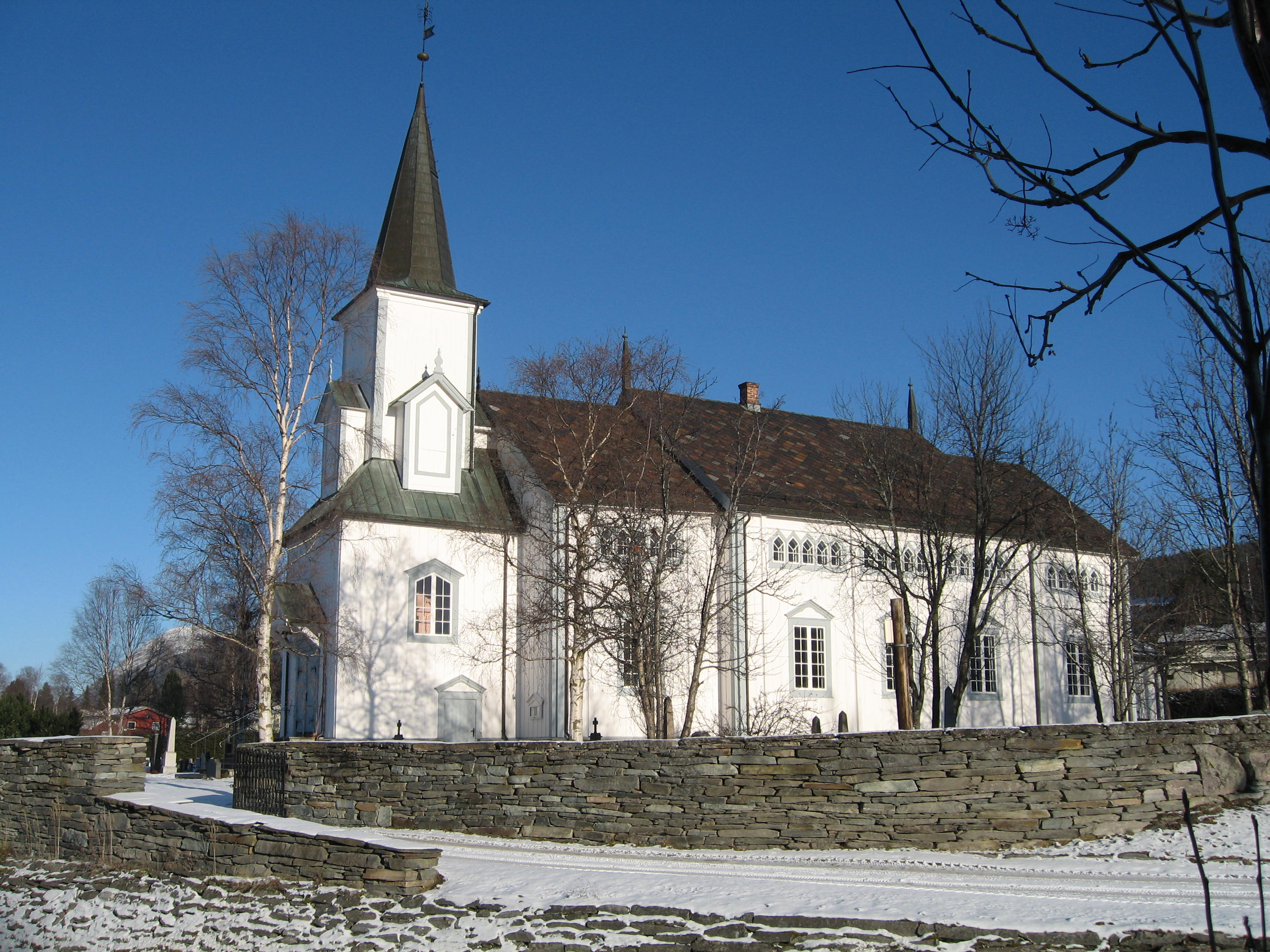

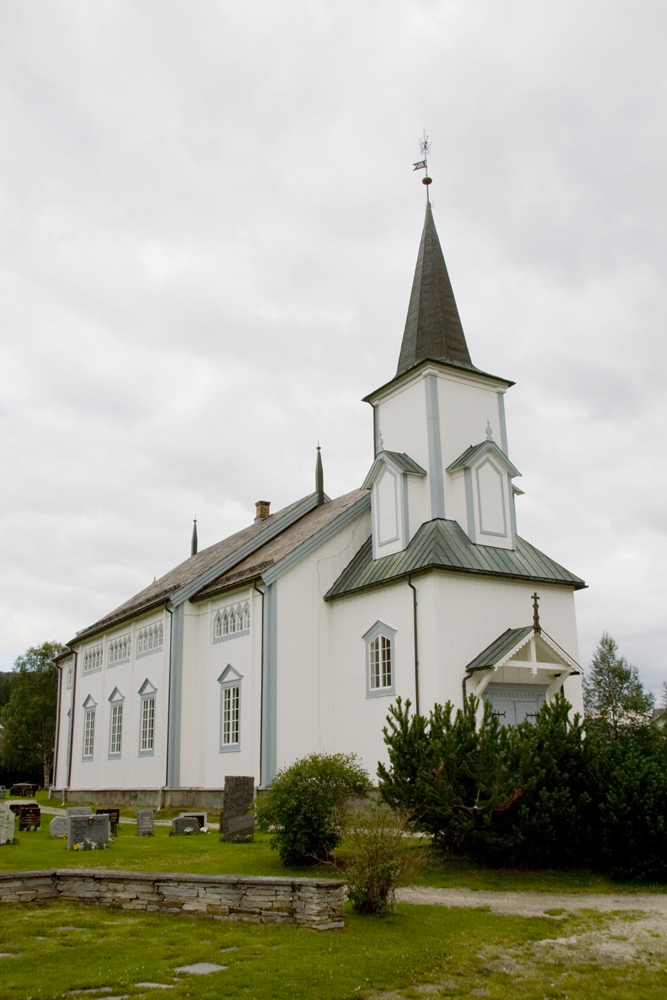

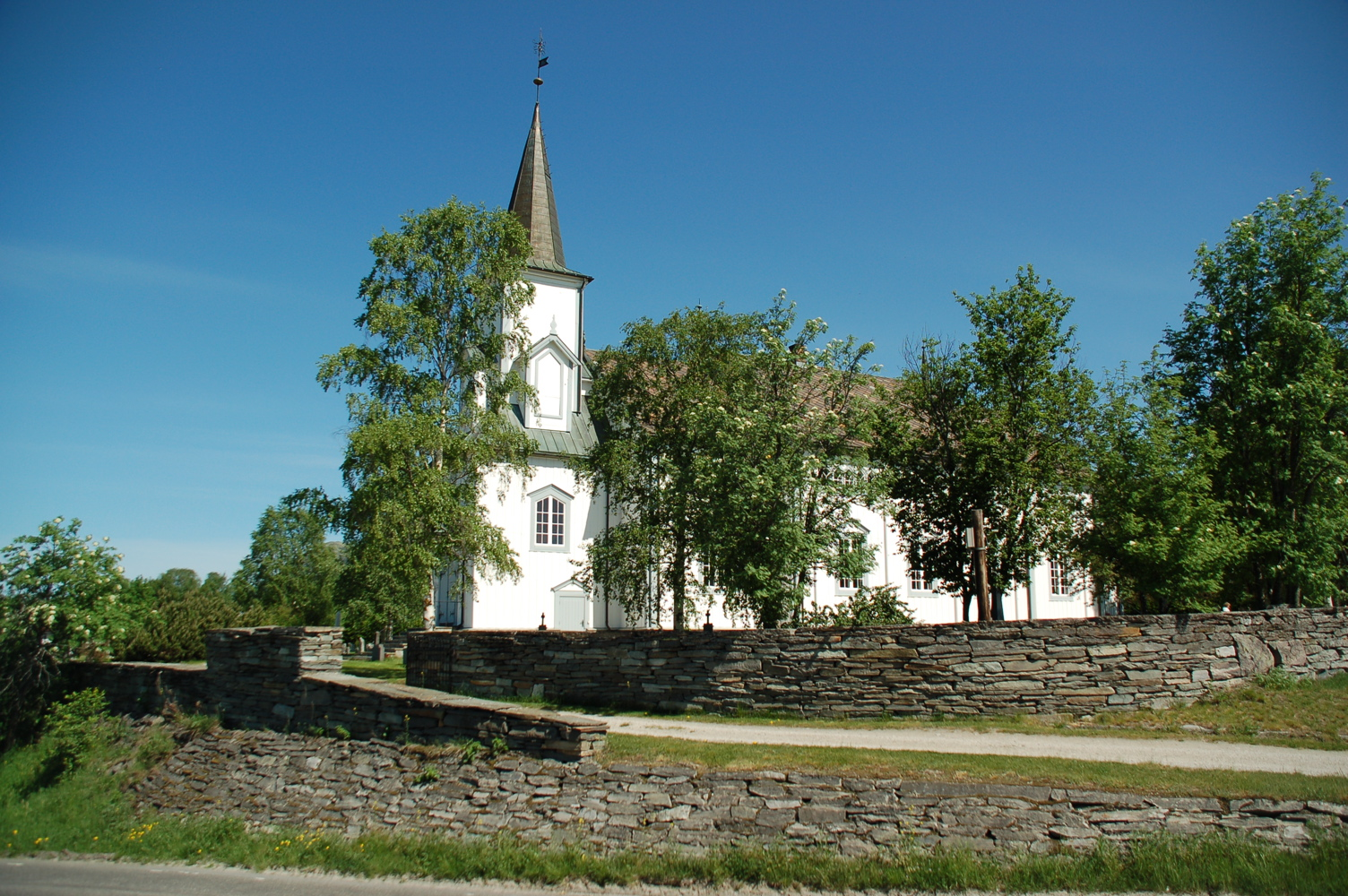

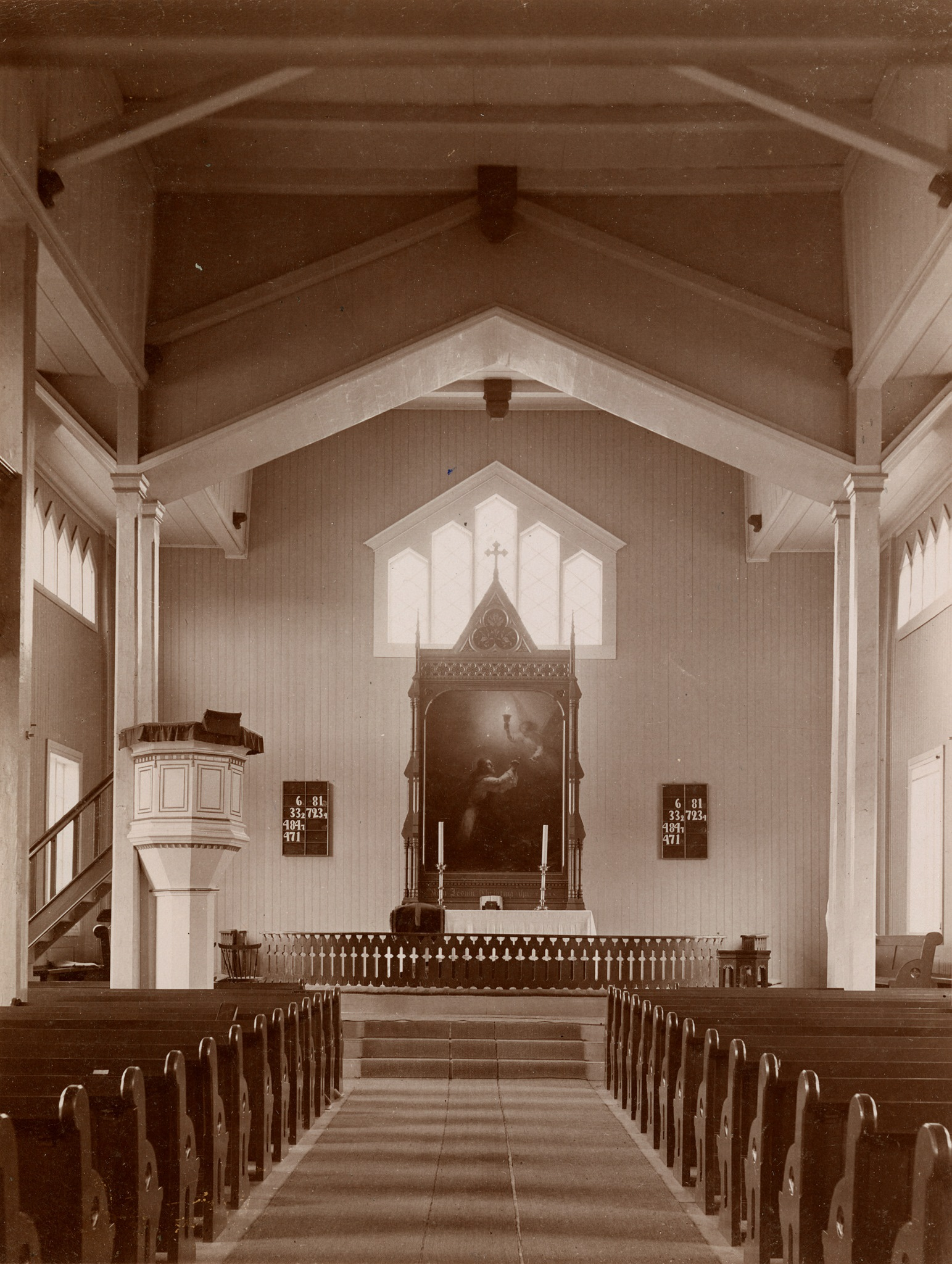

== See also ==
- List of churches in Hamar
