= Jutulhogget (Østerdalen) =

Valley in Innlandet, Norway

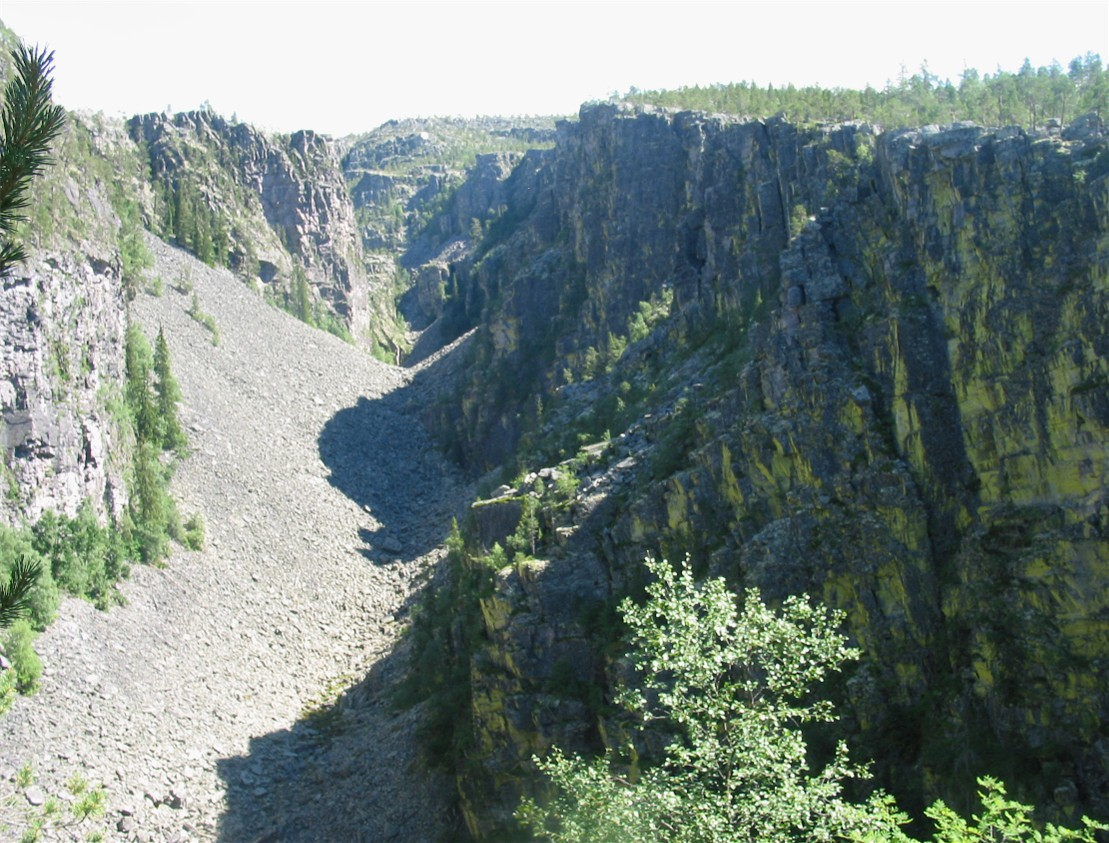
- Length: 2.4 km (1.5 mi) west-east
- Depth: 100 to 240 m (330 to 790 ft)

Geology
- Type: Canyon

Geography
- Location: Innlandet, Norway
- Coordinates: 61°59′55″N 10°54′14″E

Location
- Interactive map of the valley

Jutulhogget is a 2.4-kilometre (1.5 mi) long dry canyon in Innlandet county, Norway. The canyon is located on the border of Alvdal Municipality and Rendalen Municipality. It was created by the rupture of the dam of a proglacial lake and the force of the rushing water leaving the lake carved out the canyon. The canyon was protected as a nature reserve in 1959. The steep walls of the canyon range from 100 to 240 metres (330 to 790 ft) in height.

The canyon was formed at the end of the last Ice Age, around 10,400 years ago. The proglacial lake Nedre Glomsjø was dammed up by glaciers stopping the water from running southward. As the amount of meltwater rose, it eventually broke through its earthen boundaries and formed a new outlet heading eastward through a weakness zone in the bedrock. The lake drained through to the Rendalen valley at an estimated 180,000 cubic metres per second (6,400,000 cu ft/s). The pressure of the water quickly dug through the rock and formed the canyon in a matter of days. To the early settlers downstream, this would have been a cataclysmic and sudden event.
