= Alvdal Municipality =

Municipality in Innlandet, Norway

Alvdal Municipality Alvdal kommune
- Municipality
- Lille Elvdalen herred (historic name)
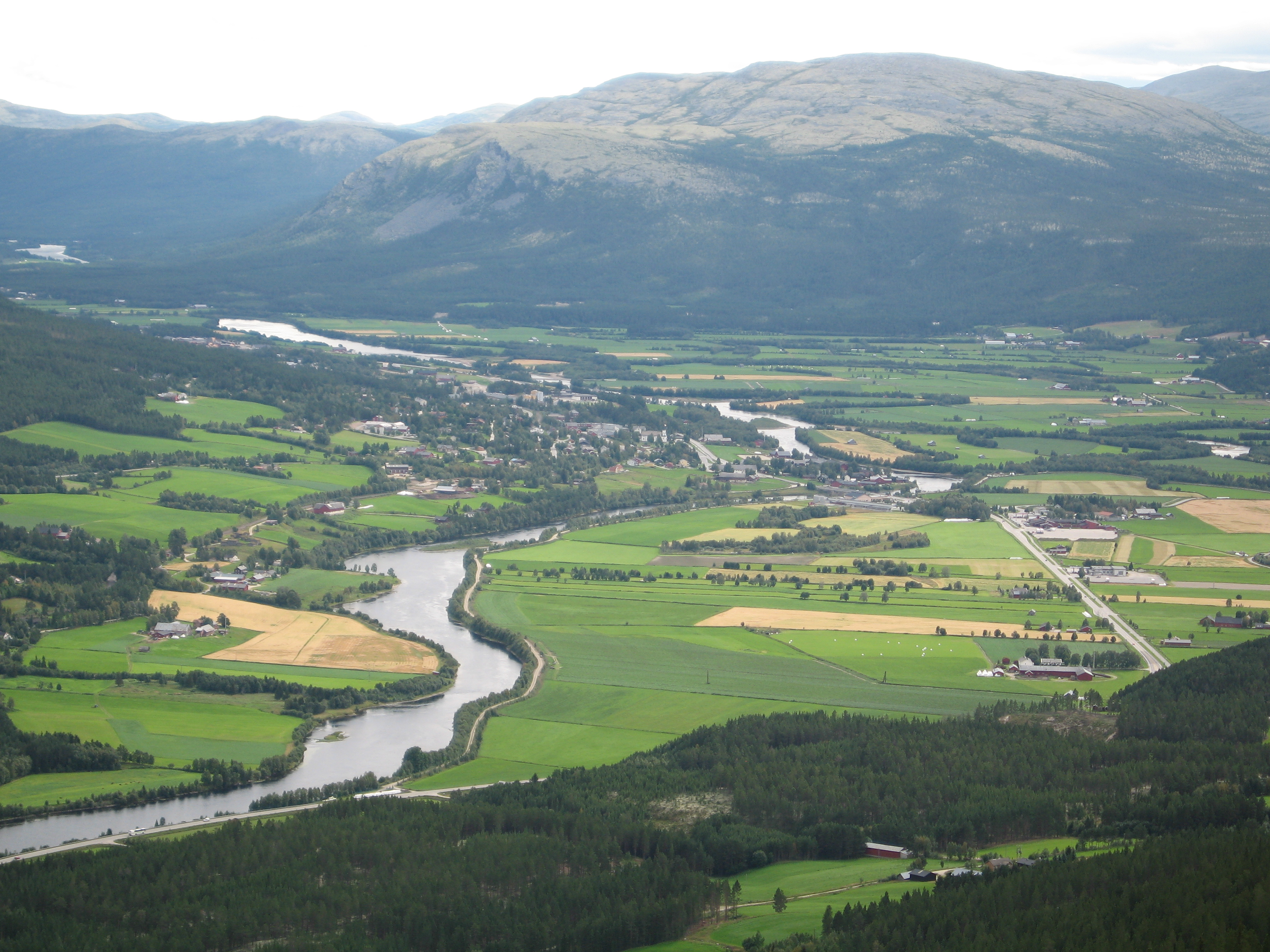
- Aerial view of the village of Alvdal

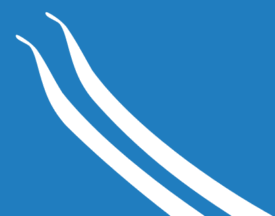
- Flag Coat of arms

- Innlandet within Norway

- Alvdal within Innlandet
- Coordinates: 62°4′18″N 10°30′27″E
- Country: Norway
- County: Innlandet
- District: Østerdalen
- Established: 1864
  - Preceded by: Tynset Municipality
- Administrative centre: Alvdal

Government
  - Mayor (2019): Mona Murud (Sp)

Area
  - Total: 942.15 km^{2} (363.77 sq mi)
  - Land: 919.08 km^{2} (354.86 sq mi)
  - Water: 23.07 km^{2} (8.91 sq mi) 2.4%
  - Rank: #124 in Norway
- Highest elevation: 1,826.88 m (5,993.7 ft)

Population (2025)
  - Total: 2,509
  - Rank: #254 in Norway
  - Density: 2.7/km^{2} (7.0/sq mi)
  - Change (10 years): ▲ +3.9%
- Demonym: Alvdøl

Official language
  - Norwegian form: Neutral
- Time zone: UTC+01:00 (CET)
  - Summer (DST): UTC+02:00 (CEST)
- ISO 3166 code: NO-3428
- Website: Official website

Alvdal is a municipality in Innlandet county, Norway. It is located in the traditional district of Østerdalen. The administrative centre of the municipality is the village of Alvdal. Other villages include Barkald, Plassmoen, and Strømmen. The municipality is located to the south of Tynset Municipality, north and west of Rendalen Municipality, north of Stor-Elvdal Municipality, and east of Folldal Municipality. The Rørosbane railway and the Norwegian National Road 3 both pass through Alvdal.

The 942-square-kilometre (364 sq mi) municipality is the 124th largest by area out of the 357 municipalities in Norway. Alvdal Municipality is the 254th most populous municipality in Norway with a population of 2,509. The municipality's population density is 2.7 inhabitants per square kilometre (7.0/sq mi) and its population has increased by 3.9% over the previous 10-year period.

== General information ==
In 1864, the parish of Lille-Elvdalen (later renamed "Alvdal") was separated from the large Tynset Municipality to become the new Lille-Elvdalen Municipality. Initially, the new municipality had a population of 3,216. On 1 January 1914, the western part of Alvdal Municipality (population: 2,284) was separated to become the new Folldal Municipality. This left Alvdal Municipality with 2,135 residents.

Historically, the municipality was part of Hedmark county. On 1 January 2020, the municipality became a part of the newly-formed Innlandet county (after Hedmark and Oppland counties were merged).

=== Name ===
The area was historically known as Elvdalen or Øvre Elvdalen (Old Norse: (øfri) Elfardalr). The first element is øfri meaning "upper", the next part is the genitive case of elfr which means "river", and the last element is dalr which means "valley" or "dale". Thus the name means "(upper) river valley", referring to the upper part of the Glåma river valley. When the municipality was established in 1864, it was named Lille-Elvdalen Municipality, which meant "Little" Elvdalen in order to distinguish it from the nearby Store Elvedalen Municipality ("the large Elvedalen"). On 3 November 1917, a royal resolution changed the spelling of the name of the municipality to Alvdal, to better represent the local pronunciation of the name.

=== Coat of arms ===
The coat of arms was granted on 25 November 1988. The official blazon is "Azure, two skis in bend issuant from base sinister" (Norwegian: I blått to skrått framvoksende sølv ski). This means the arms have a blue field (background) and the charge is a set of two diagonal skis. The charge has a tincture of argent which means it is commonly colored white, but if it is made out of metal, then silver is used. The design symbolizes the history and importance of skiing in the area. One of the oldest pairs of skis discovered by archeologists in Norway was found in Alvdal. The skis were dated to about 500 AD. The arms were designed by Helge Ness from Alvdal. The municipal flag has the same design as the coat of arms.

=== Churches ===
The Church of Norway has one parish (sokn) within Alvdal Municipality. It is part of the Nord-Østerdal prosti (deanery) in the Diocese of Hamar.

Churches in Alvdal
Parish (sokn)	Church name	Location of the church	Year built
Alvdal	Alvdal Church	Alvdal	1861

== Geography ==
Alvdal is bordered by Tynset Municipality to the north, Rendalen Municipality to the east and south, Stor-Elvdal Municipality to the south, and Folldal Municipality to the west. The highest point in the municipality is the 1,826.88-metre (5,993.7 ft) tall mountain Storsølnkletten. Another notable mountain in the municipality is Tronfjell. The lake Savalen is partially located in Alvdal. The rivers Sivilla and Glåma both flow through the municipality. The Jutulhogget canyon is located in this municipality as well.

== Economy ==
Agriculture and forestry are the most important industries in Alvdal Municipality. The municipality rented public land to a bitcoin mining operation. In 2022, the municipality decided not to continue renting land to this company since no jobs were created from that enterprise, although one local company did some service work on occasion at the site. In 2023, the municipality was sued for 4 million kr by the operator of the former bitcoin mining facility (on municipal property).

== Government ==
Alvdal Municipality is responsible for primary education (through 10th grade), outpatient health services, senior citizen services, welfare and other social services, zoning, economic development, and municipal roads and utilities. The municipality is governed by a municipal council of directly elected representatives. The mayor is indirectly elected by a vote of the municipal council. The municipality is under the jurisdiction of the Hedmarken og Østerdal District Court and the Eidsivating Court of Appeal.

=== Municipal council ===
The municipal council (Kommunestyre) of Alvdal Municipality is made up of 17 representatives that are elected to four year terms. The tables below show the current and historical composition of the council by political party.

Alvdal kommunestyre 2023–2027
Party name (in Norwegian)	Number of representatives
Labour Party (Arbeiderpartiet)	3
Conservative Party (Høyre)	4
Centre Party (Senterpartiet)	8
Liberal Party (Venstre)	1
Joint list of the Red Party (Rødt) and the Socialist Left Party (Sosialistisk Venstreparti)	1
Total number of members:	17

Alvdal kommunestyre 2019–2023
Party name (in Norwegian)	Number of representatives
Labour Party (Arbeiderpartiet)	4
Green Party (Miljøpartiet De Grønne)	1
Conservative Party (Høyre)	4
Christian Democratic Party (Kristelig Folkeparti)	1
Centre Party (Senterpartiet)	7
Total number of members:	17

Alvdal kommunestyre 2015–2019
Party name (in Norwegian)	Number of representatives
Labour Party (Arbeiderpartiet)	7
Conservative Party (Høyre)	2
Christian Democratic Party (Kristelig Folkeparti)	1
Centre Party (Senterpartiet)	6
Liberal Party (Venstre)	1
Total number of members:	17

Alvdal kommunestyre 2011–2015
Party name (in Norwegian)	Number of representatives
Labour Party (Arbeiderpartiet)	6
Progress Party (Fremskrittspartiet)	1
Christian Democratic Party (Kristelig Folkeparti)	1
Centre Party (Senterpartiet)	6
Liberal Party (Venstre)	3
Total number of members:	17

Alvdal kommunestyre 2007–2011
Party name (in Norwegian)	Number of representatives
Labour Party (Arbeiderpartiet)	6
Christian Democratic Party (Kristelig Folkeparti)	2
Centre Party (Senterpartiet)	6
Liberal Party (Venstre)	3
Total number of members:	17

Alvdal kommunestyre 2003–2007
Party name (in Norwegian)	Number of representatives
Labour Party (Arbeiderpartiet)	8
Christian Democratic Party (Kristelig Folkeparti)	1
Centre Party (Senterpartiet)	5
Liberal Party (Venstre)	2
Local list for Alvdal (Bygdelista i Alvdal)	1
Total number of members:	17

Alvdal kommunestyre 1999–2003
Party name (in Norwegian)	Number of representatives
Labour Party (Arbeiderpartiet)	8
Christian Democratic Party (Kristelig Folkeparti)	1
Centre Party (Senterpartiet)	6
Liberal Party (Venstre)	2
Local list for Alvdal (Bygdelista i Alvdal)	2
Total number of members:	17

Alvdal kommunestyre 1995–1999
Party name (in Norwegian)	Number of representatives
Labour Party (Arbeiderpartiet)	6
Christian Democratic Party (Kristelig Folkeparti)	1
Centre Party (Senterpartiet)	7
Liberal Party (Venstre)	3
Total number of members:	17

Alvdal kommunestyre 1991–1995
Party name (in Norwegian)	Number of representatives
Labour Party (Arbeiderpartiet)	5
Conservative Party (Høyre)	1
Christian Democratic Party (Kristelig Folkeparti)	1
Centre Party (Senterpartiet)	8
Socialist Left Party (Sosialistisk Venstreparti)	1
Liberal Party (Venstre)	1
Total number of members:	17

Alvdal kommunestyre 1987–1991
Party name (in Norwegian)	Number of representatives
Labour Party (Arbeiderpartiet)	7
Conservative Party (Høyre)	2
Centre Party (Senterpartiet)	6
Liberal Party (Venstre)	2
Total number of members:	17

Alvdal kommunestyre 1983–1987
Party name (in Norwegian)	Number of representatives
Labour Party (Arbeiderpartiet)	7
Conservative Party (Høyre)	2
Centre Party (Senterpartiet)	7
Liberal Party (Venstre)	1
Total number of members:	17

Alvdal kommunestyre 1979–1983
Party name (in Norwegian)	Number of representatives
Labour Party (Arbeiderpartiet)	8
Conservative Party (Høyre)	1
Centre Party (Senterpartiet)	7
Free Voters (Frie velgere)	1
Total number of members:	17

Alvdal kommunestyre 1975–1979
Party name (in Norwegian)	Number of representatives
Labour Party (Arbeiderpartiet)	7
Christian Democratic Party (Kristelig Folkeparti)	1
Centre Party (Senterpartiet)	8
Free Voters (Frie Velger)	1
Total number of members:	17

Alvdal kommunestyre 1971–1975
Party name (in Norwegian)	Number of representatives
Labour Party (Arbeiderpartiet)	8
Centre Party (Senterpartiet)	8
Liberal Party (Venstre)	1
Total number of members:	17

Alvdal kommunestyre 1967–1971
Party name (in Norwegian)	Number of representatives
Labour Party (Arbeiderpartiet)	8
Centre Party (Senterpartiet)	8
Liberal Party (Venstre)	1
Total number of members:	17

Alvdal kommunestyre 1963–1967
Party name (in Norwegian)	Number of representatives
Labour Party (Arbeiderpartiet)	8
Christian Democratic Party (Kristelig Folkeparti)	1
Centre Party (Senterpartiet)	7
Liberal Party (Venstre)	1
Total number of members:	17

Alvdal herredsstyre 1959–1963
Party name (in Norwegian)	Number of representatives
Labour Party (Arbeiderpartiet)	8
Centre Party (Senterpartiet)	7
Liberal Party (Venstre)	2
Total number of members:	17

Alvdal herredsstyre 1955–1959
Party name (in Norwegian)	Number of representatives
Labour Party (Arbeiderpartiet)	8
Farmers' Party (Bondepartiet)	7
Liberal Party (Venstre)	2
Total number of members:	17

Alvdal herredsstyre 1951–1955
Party name (in Norwegian)	Number of representatives
Labour Party (Arbeiderpartiet)	6
Farmers' Party (Bondepartiet)	5
Liberal Party (Venstre)	1
Total number of members:	12

Alvdal herredsstyre 1947–1951
Party name (in Norwegian)	Number of representatives
Labour Party (Arbeiderpartiet)	5
Farmers' Party (Bondepartiet)	5
Liberal Party (Venstre)	2
Total number of members:	12

Alvdal herredsstyre 1945–1947
Party name (in Norwegian)	Number of representatives
Labour Party (Arbeiderpartiet)	6
Farmers' Party (Bondepartiet)	4
Liberal Party (Venstre)	2
Total number of members:	12

Alvdal herredsstyre 1937–1941*
Party name (in Norwegian)	Number of representatives
Labour Party (Arbeiderpartiet)	4
Farmers' Party (Bondepartiet)	5
Liberal Party (Venstre)	3
Total number of members:	12
Note: Due to the German occupation of Norway during World War II, no elections were held for new municipal councils until after the war ended in 1945.

=== Mayors ===
The mayor (Norwegian: ordfører) of Alvdal Municipality is the political leader of the municipality and the chairperson of the municipal council. Here is a list of people who have held this position:

- 1864–1865: Fritz Emil Aas
- 1866–1873: Morten Mortensen
- 1874–1881: Fritz Emil Aas
- 1882–1883: Johan Steien
- 1884–1891: Morten Mortensen
- 1892–1893: Johan Steien
- 1894–1895: Morten Sandvold
- 1896–1898: P. Randmæl
- 1899–1901: Jacob Stamoen
- 1902–1904: P. Randmæl
- 1905–1907: Haldo Müller
- 1908–1910: P. Randmæl
- 1911–1916: Per Hoel
- 1917–1919: P. Randmæl
- 1920–1922: Per Hoel
- 1923–1925: Arne Mellesmo
- 1926–1931: Per Hoel
- 1932–1934: Martin Müller
- 1935–1942: Olav Nyeggen
- 1942–1945: Embret Mellesmo
- 1946–1955: Harald Reinertsen
- 1956–1963: Eivind Kveberg
- 1963–1967: Lars Holen
- 1968–1969: Oddgeir Skarpsno
- 1970–1971: Asmund Westgård
- 1971–1979: Kåre Blystad (Sp)
- 1979–1983: Per Arnfinn Bergebakken (Sp)
- 1983–1991: Sverre Dalen (Sp)
- 1991–1995: Sverre Sørbø (Sp)
- 1995–1999: Per Hvamstad (Sp)
- 1999–2007: Svein Borkhus (Ap)
- 2007–2011: Olov Grøtting (Sp)
- 2011–2015: Svein Borkhus (Ap)
- 2015–2019: Johnny Hagen (Ap)
- 2019–present: Mona Murud (Sp)

== Notable people ==
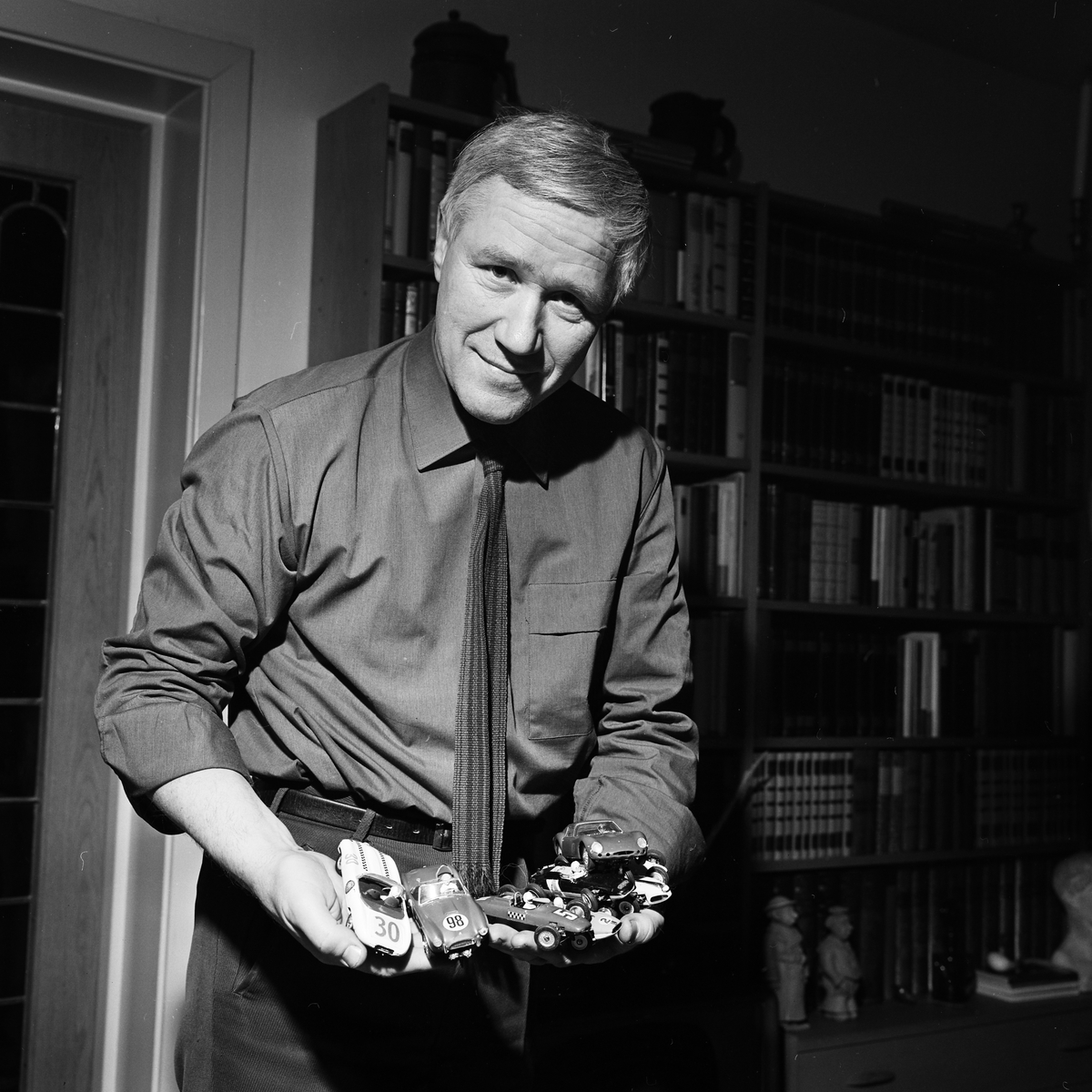
Kjell Aukrust, 1965

- Ivar Mortensson-Egnund (1857–1934), an author, journalist, theologian, researcher, translator, writer, philosopher, and advocate of nynorsk
- Lars Olsen Aukrust (1886–1965), a farmer and politician
- Arvid Nilssen (1913–1976), an actor, revue artist, singer, and comedian
- Kjell Aukrust (1920–2002), an author, humourist, poet, and artist; the Huset Aukrust, (Norwegian Wiki) is dedicated to him and he is famous for creating the fictional Norwegian village of Flåklypa and its cast of idiosyncratic characters
- Ola Jonsmoen (born 1932), an educator, poet, novelist, and children's writer
- Svein Borkhus (born 1955), a politician and Mayor of Alvdal from 1999 to 2007
- Olov Grøtting (born 1960), a politician and Mayor of Alvdal from 2007 to 2011
- Anne Nørdsti (born 1977), a dansband singer who was influenced by country music

=== Sport ===
- Per Samuelshaug (1905–1990), a cross-country skier who participated at the 1936 Winter Olympics
- Kristian Bjørn (1919–1993), a cross-country skier who competed at the 1948 Winter Olympics
- Torgeir Bjørn (born 1964), a retired cross-country skier who competed at the 1988 Winter Olympics
- Harald Stormoen (born 1980), a retired footballer with over 200 club caps
