= Alvdal (village) =

Village in Alvdal Municipality, Norway

Alvdal Steia
- Village
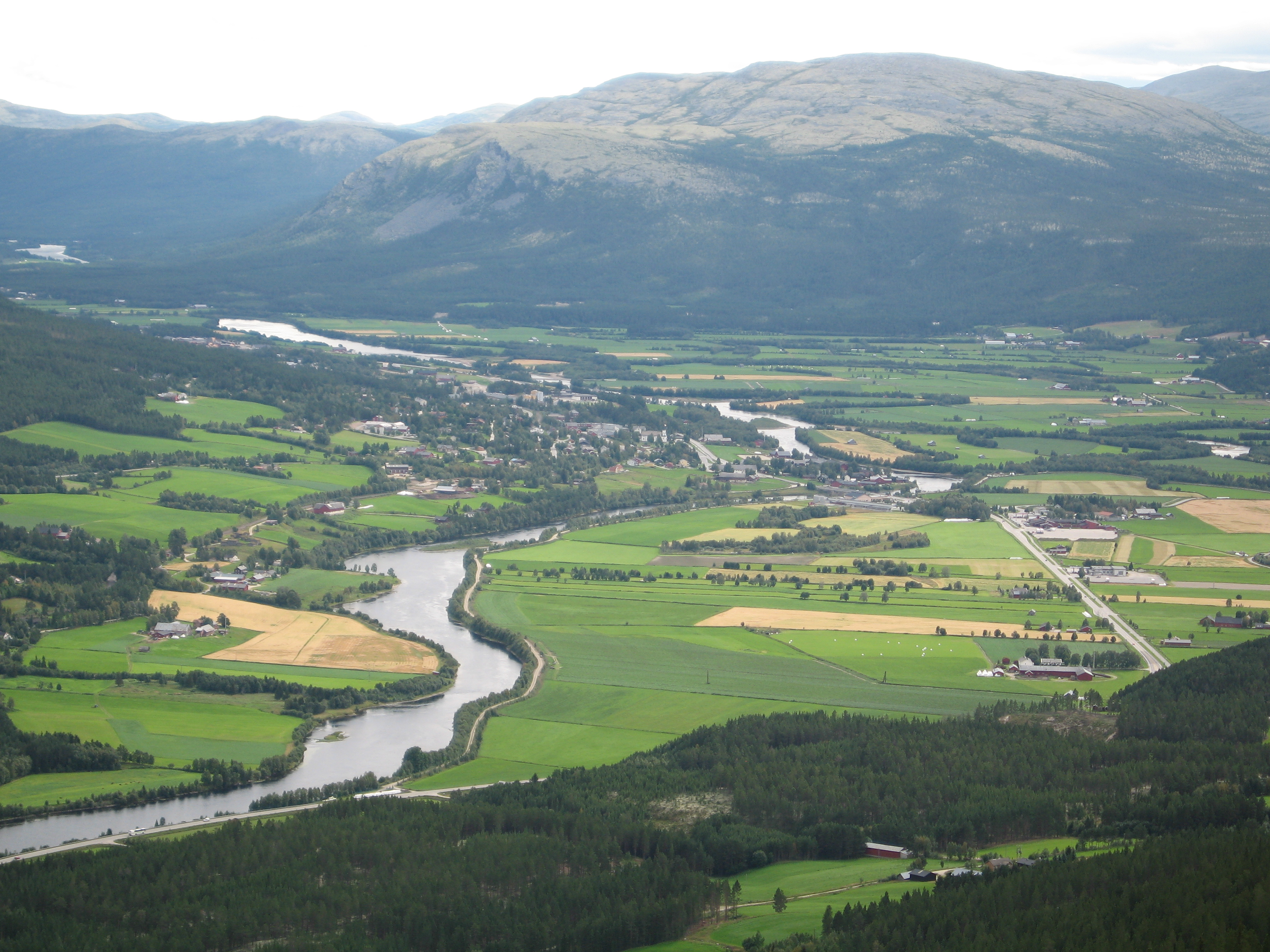
- View of the village
- Interactive map of Alvdal
- Location within Innlandet Location within Norway
- Coordinates: 62.10768°N 10.63071°E
- Country: Norway
- Region: Eastern Norway
- County: Innlandet
- District: Østerdalen
- Municipality: Alvdal Municipality

Area
  - Total: 1.45 km^{2} (0.56 sq mi)
- Elevation: 508 m (1,667 ft)

Population (2024)
  - Total: 855
  - Density: 590/km^{2} (1,500/sq mi)
- Time zone: UTC+01:00 (CET)
  - Summer (DST): UTC+02:00 (CEST)
- Post Code: 2560 Alvdal

Alvdal is the administrative centre of Alvdal Municipality in Innlandet county, Norway. The village is located along the river Glåma, about 25 kilometres (16 mi) to the south of the town of Tynset. Alvdal Church is located in the village.

The 1.45-square-kilometre (360-acre) village has a population (2024) of 855 and a population density of 590 inhabitants per square kilometre (1,500/sq mi).

The Norwegian National Road 3 runs through the village. The Rørosbanen railway line also passes through the village, stopping at Alvdal Station.
