= Rien (Norway) =

Lake in Trøndelag, Norway

- Interactive map of the lake
- Location: Røros Municipality, Trøndelag
- Coordinates: 62.7402°N 11.8845°E
- Primary outflows: Glomma
- Catchment area: Glommadal
- Basin countries: Norway
- Max. length: 6 kilometres (3.7 mi)
- Max. width: 5 kilometres (3.1 mi)
- Surface area: 14.87 km^{2} (5.74 sq mi)
- Shore length^{1}: 31.88 kilometres (19.81 mi)
- Surface elevation: 748 metres (2,454 ft)
- References: NVE
- ^{1} Shore length is not a well-defined measure.

Rien is a lake in Røros Municipality in Trøndelag county, Norway. The 14.87-square-kilometre (5.74 sq mi) lake is located near the headwaters of the river Glomma, only about 10 kilometres (6.2 mi) west of the border with Sweden. The water flows out through the river Glomma and heads a short distance south, into the large lake Aursunden. The village of Brekken lies about 6 kilometres (3.7 mi) south of the lake and the town of Røros lies about 40 kilometres (25 mi) to the southwest.

== See also ==
- List of lakes in Norway
