= Glåmos Municipality =

Former municipality in Trøndelag, Norway

Glåmos Municipality Glåmos herred
- Former municipality
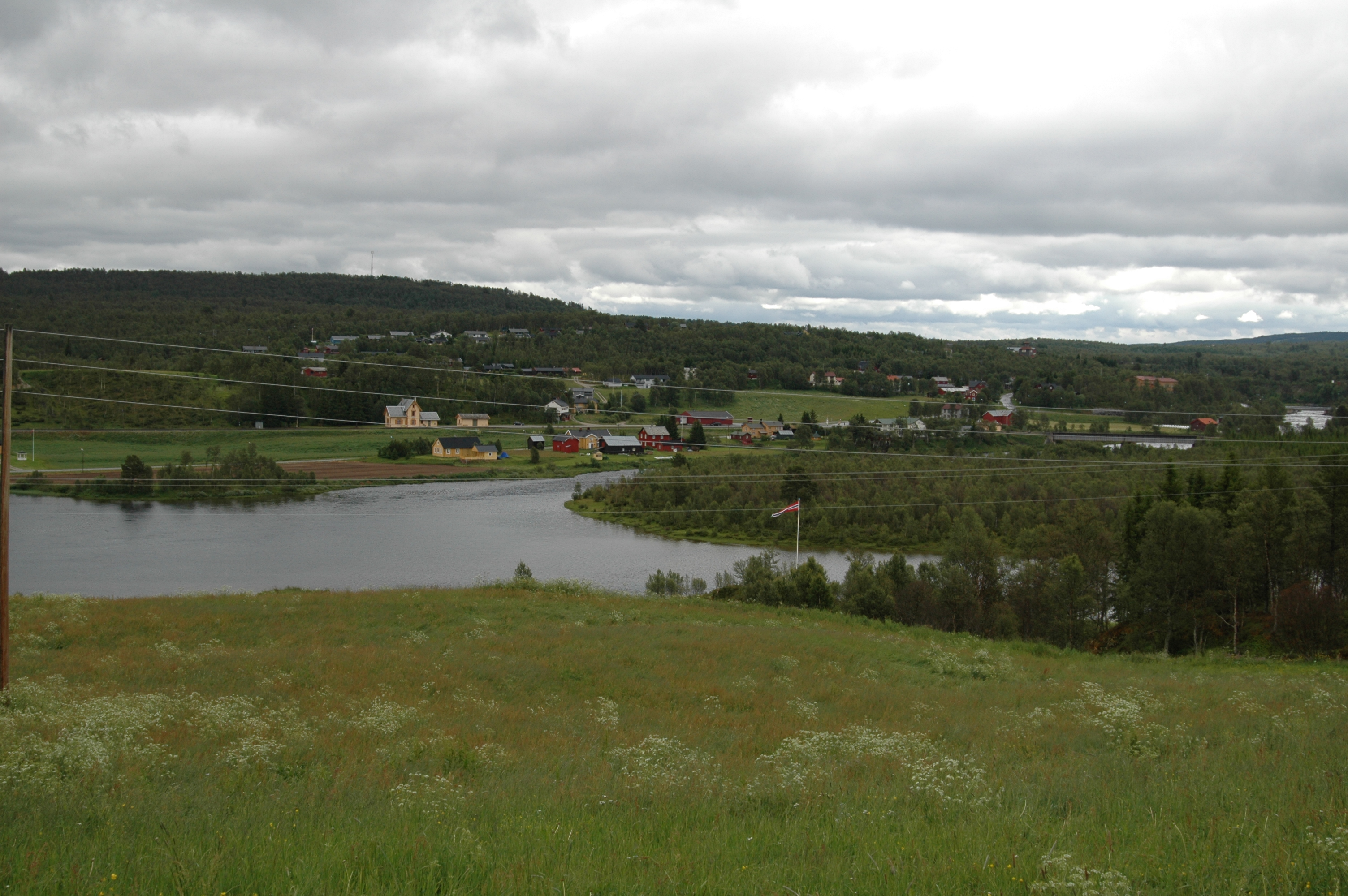
- View of Glåmos

- Sør-Trøndelag within Norway

- Glåmos within Sør-Trøndelag
- Coordinates: 62.6714°N 11.4288°E
- Country: Norway
- County: Sør-Trøndelag
- District: Gauldalen
- Established: 1 Jan 1926
  - Preceded by: Røros Municipality
- Disestablished: 1 Jan 1964
  - Succeeded by: Røros Municipality
- Administrative centre: Glåmos

Government
  - Mayor (1945–1963): Ingvar Kr. Harborg (Ap)

Area (upon dissolution)
  - Total: 238.9 km^{2} (92.2 sq mi)
  - Rank: #337 in Norway
- Highest elevation: 1,265 m (4,150 ft)

Population (1963)
  - Total: 703
  - Rank: #656 in Norway
  - Density: 2.9/km^{2} (7.5/sq mi)
  - Change (10 years): ▼ −19.6%
- Demonym: Glåmosing

Official language
  - Norwegian form: Neutral
- Time zone: UTC+01:00 (CET)
  - Summer (DST): UTC+02:00 (CEST)
- ISO 3166 code: NO-1643

Glåmos is a former municipality in the old Sør-Trøndelag county in Norway. The 239-square-kilometre (92 sq mi) municipality existed from 1926 until its dissolution in 1964. It was located in the northern part of what is now Røros Municipality in Trøndelag county. It included all the area around the headwaters of the river Glåma and the areas surrounding the northern and western sides of the lake Aursunden. The administrative centre was the village of Glåmos where Glåmos Church is located.

Prior to its dissolution in 1964, the 238.9-square-kilometre (92.2 sq mi) municipality was the 337th largest by area out of the 689 municipalities in Norway. Glåmos Municipality was the 656th most populous municipality in Norway with a population of about 703. The municipality's population density was 2.9 inhabitants per square kilometre (7.5/sq mi) and its population had decreased by 19.6% over the previous 10-year period.

The municipality had copper mines located in the mountains near the village that used to supply the Røros Copper Works in the nearby town of Røros.

== General information ==
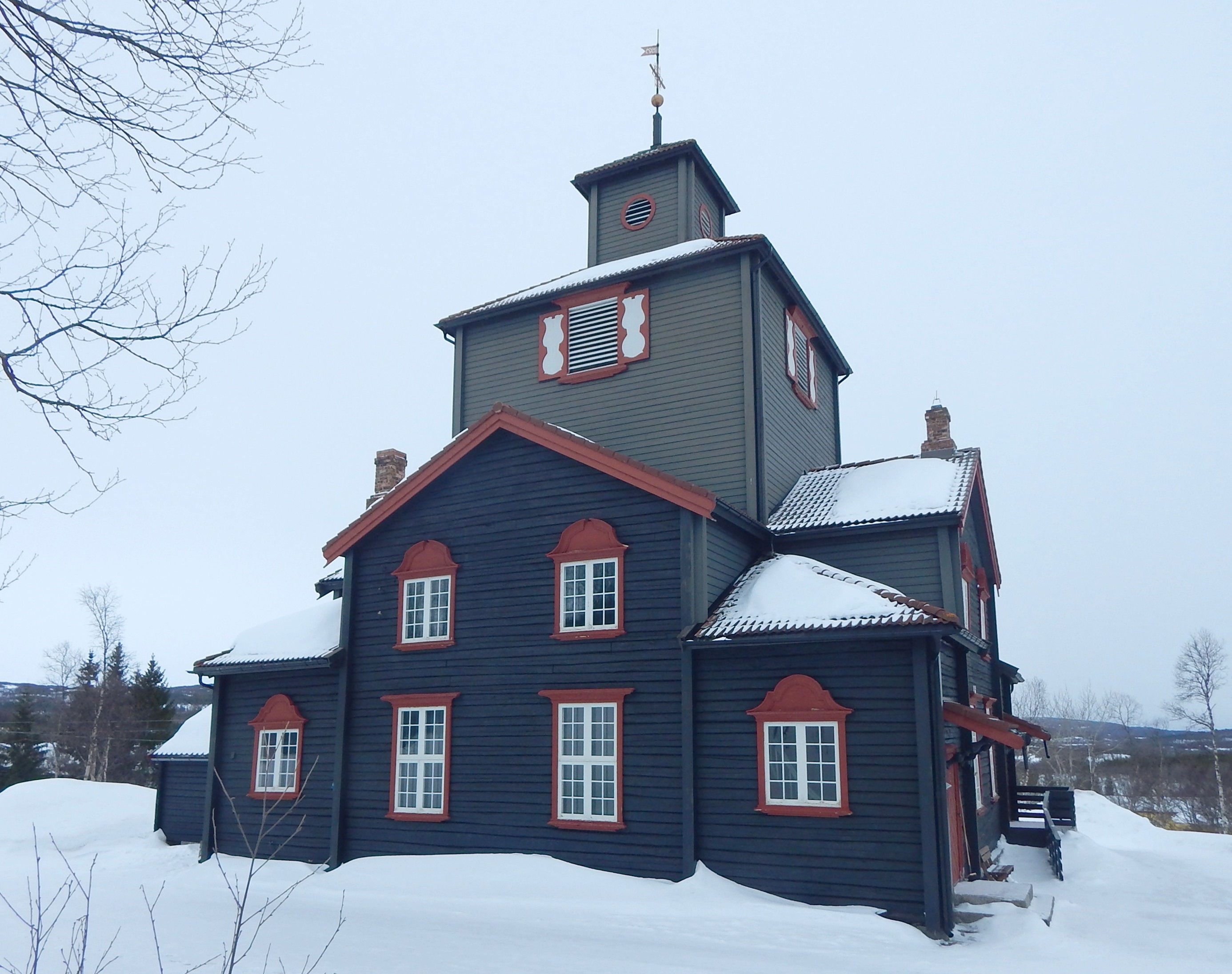
View of Glåmos Church

View of rural Glåmos

The parish of Glåmos was established as a municipality on 1 January 1926 when the large Røros Municipality was split into four parts: Brekken Municipality (population: 1,098) in the northeast, Glåmos Municipality (population: 983) in the north, Røros landsogn (population: 701) in the south and west, and the central area surrounding the town of Røros (population: 2,284) remained as a much smaller Røros Municipality.

During the 1960s, there were many municipal mergers across Norway due to the work of the Schei Committee. On 1 January 1964, Brekken Municipality (population: 964), Glåmos Municipality (population: 700), and Røros landsogn (population: 482) were all merged with Røros Municipality (population: 3,063) to form a new, larger Røros Municipality.

=== Name ===
The municipal name is a relatively new construction. It was chosen to represent the area around the river Glåma, near the mouth of the lake Aursunden. The first element is based on the name of the river Glåma (Old Norse: glaumr or raumr) which may mean "loud noise" or "thunder". The last element comes from the Old Norse word óss which means "river mouth".

=== Churches ===
The Church of Norway had one parish (sokn) within Glåmos Municipality. At the time of the municipal dissolution, it was part of the Røros prestegjeld and the Gauldal prosti (deanery) in the Diocese of Nidaros.

Churches in Glåmos Municipality
| Parish (sokn) | Church name | Location of the church | Year built |
|---|---|---|---|
| Glåmos | Glåmos Church | Glåmos | 1926 |

== Geography ==
View of the Glåmos landscape

Glåmos Municipality was located in the mountains at the headwaters of the river Glåma. Ålen Municipality was located to the north, Brekken Municipality was to the east, Røros Municipality was to the south, and Røros landsogn was located to the south and west. The highest point in the municipality was the 1,265-metre (4,150 ft) tall mountain Storskarven, located on the border with Ålen Municipality.

== Government ==
While it existed, Glåmos Municipality was responsible for primary education (through 10th grade), outpatient health services, senior citizen services, welfare and other social services, zoning, economic development, and municipal roads and utilities. The municipality was governed by a municipal council of directly elected representatives. The mayor was indirectly elected by a vote of the municipal council. The municipality was under the jurisdiction of the Frostating Court of Appeal.

=== Municipal council ===
The municipal council (Herredsstyre) of Glåmos Municipality was made up of 13 representatives that were elected to four year terms. The tables below show the historical composition of the council by political party.

Glåmos herredsstyre 1959–1963
| Party name (in Norwegian) | Number of representatives |
|---|---|
| Labour Party (Arbeiderpartiet) | 11 |
| Local List(s) (Lokale lister) | 2 |
| Total number of members: | 13 |

Glåmos herredsstyre 1955–1959
| Party name (in Norwegian) | Number of representatives |
|---|---|
| Labour Party (Arbeiderpartiet) | 9 |
| List of workers, fishermen, and small farmholders (Arbeidere, fiskere, småbrukere liste) | 4 |
| Total number of members: | 13 |

Glåmos herredsstyre 1951–1955
| Party name (in Norwegian) | Number of representatives |
|---|---|
| Labour Party (Arbeiderpartiet) | 10 |
| Local List(s) (Lokale lister) | 2 |
| Total number of members: | 12 |

Glåmos herredsstyre 1947–1951
| Party name (in Norwegian) | Number of representatives |
|---|---|
| Labour Party (Arbeiderpartiet) | 10 |
| Local List(s) (Lokale lister) | 2 |
| Total number of members: | 12 |

Glåmos herredsstyre 1945–1947
| Party name (in Norwegian) | Number of representatives |
|---|---|
| Labour Party (Arbeiderpartiet) | 10 |
| Local List(s) (Lokale lister) | 2 |
| Total number of members: | 12 |

Glåmos herredsstyre 1937–1941*
| Party name (in Norwegian) | Number of representatives |
|---|---|
| Labour Party (Arbeiderpartiet) | 9 |
| Joint List(s) of Non-Socialist Parties (Borgerlige Felleslister) | 3 |
| Total number of members: | 12 |
Note: Due to the German occupation of Norway during World War II, no elections were held for new municipal councils until after the war ended in 1945.

=== Mayors ===
The mayor (Norwegian: ordfører) of Glåmos Municipality was the political leader of the municipality and the chairperson of the municipal council. Here is a list of people who held this position:

- 1926–1928: Ole A. Ryen (Bp)
- 1929–1931: Lars S. Rugeldal (Ap)
- 1932–1945: Karl O. Erlien (Ap/NS)
- 1945–1963: Ingvar Kr. Harborg (Ap)

== See also ==
- List of former municipalities of Norway
