= Brekken Municipality =

Former municipality in Trøndelag, Norway

Brekken Municipality Brekken herred
- Former municipality
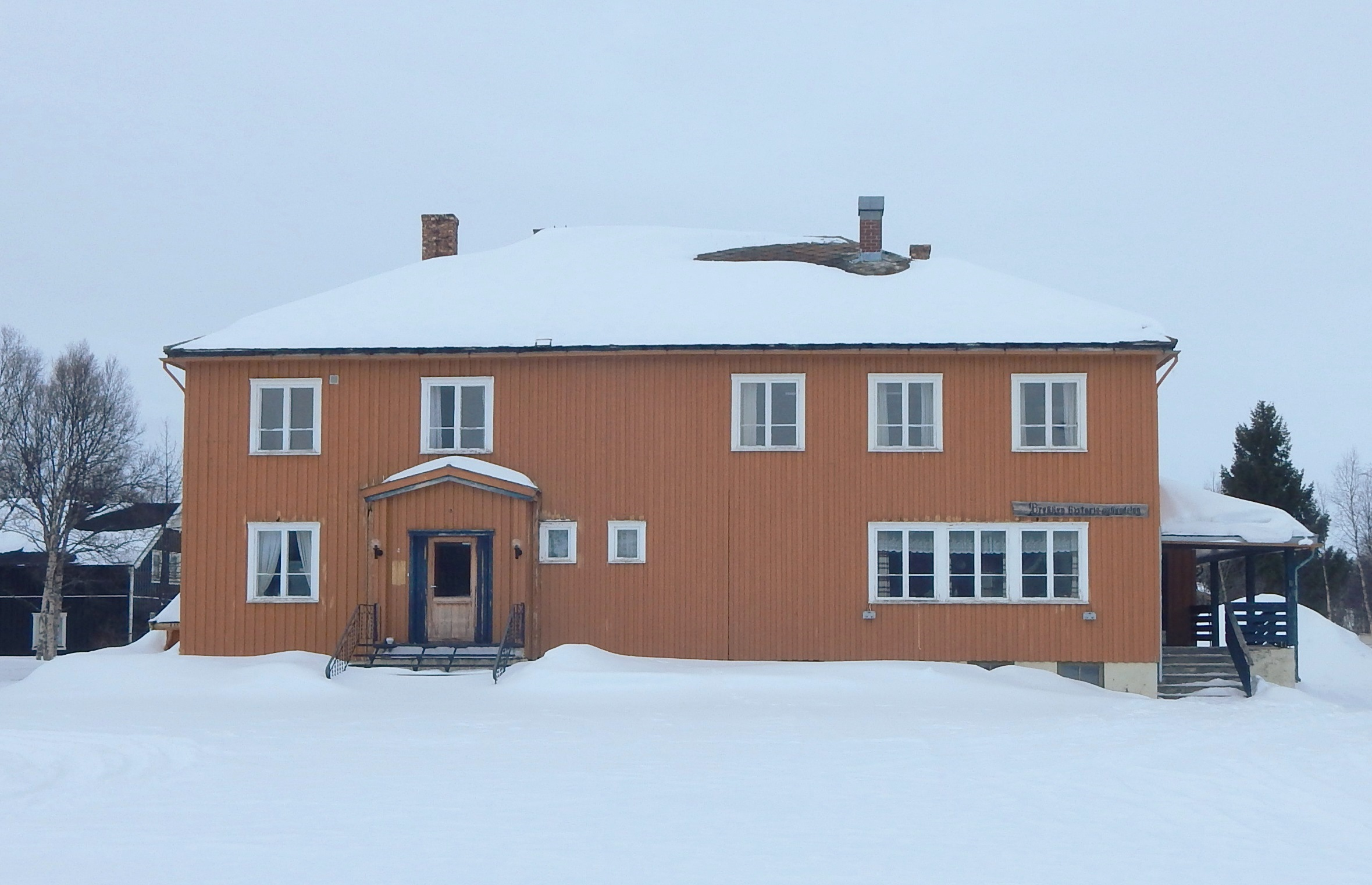
- View of the municipal government building

- Sør-Trøndelag within Norway

- Brekken within Sør-Trøndelag
- Coordinates: 62.6473°N 11.8721°E
- Country: Norway
- County: Sør-Trøndelag
- District: Gauldalen
- Established: 1926
  - Preceded by: Røros Municipality
- Disestablished: 1 Jan 1964
  - Succeeded by: Røros Municipality
- Administrative centre: Brekken

Government
  - Mayor (1956–1963): Per A. Strickert (Ap)

Area (upon dissolution)
  - Total: 843.2 km^{2} (325.6 sq mi)
  - Rank: #111 in Norway
- Highest elevation: 1,561.38 m (5,122.6 ft)

Population (1963)
  - Total: 947
  - Rank: #619 in Norway
  - Density: 1.1/km^{2} (2.8/sq mi)
  - Change (10 years): ▼ −13.2%
- Demonym: Brekking

Official language
  - Norwegian form: Neutral
- Time zone: UTC+01:00 (CET)
  - Summer (DST): UTC+02:00 (CEST)
- ISO 3166 code: NO-1642

Brekken is a former municipality in the old Sør-Trøndelag county, Norway. The 843-square-kilometre (325 sq mi) municipality existed along the border with Sweden from 1926 until its dissolution in 1964. The municipality is now located in the northeastern part of Røros Municipality in Trøndelag county. The municipality encompassed the areas located to the north, east, and southeast of the lake Aursunden. The administrative centre was the village of Brekken where Brekken Church is located.

Prior to its dissolution in 1964, the 843.2-square-kilometre (325.6 sq mi) municipality was the 111th largest by area out of the 689 municipalities in Norway. Brekken Municipality was the 619th most populous municipality in Norway with a population of about 947. The municipality's population density was 1.1 inhabitants per square kilometre (2.8/sq mi) and its population had decreased by 13.1% over the previous 10-year period.

== General information ==
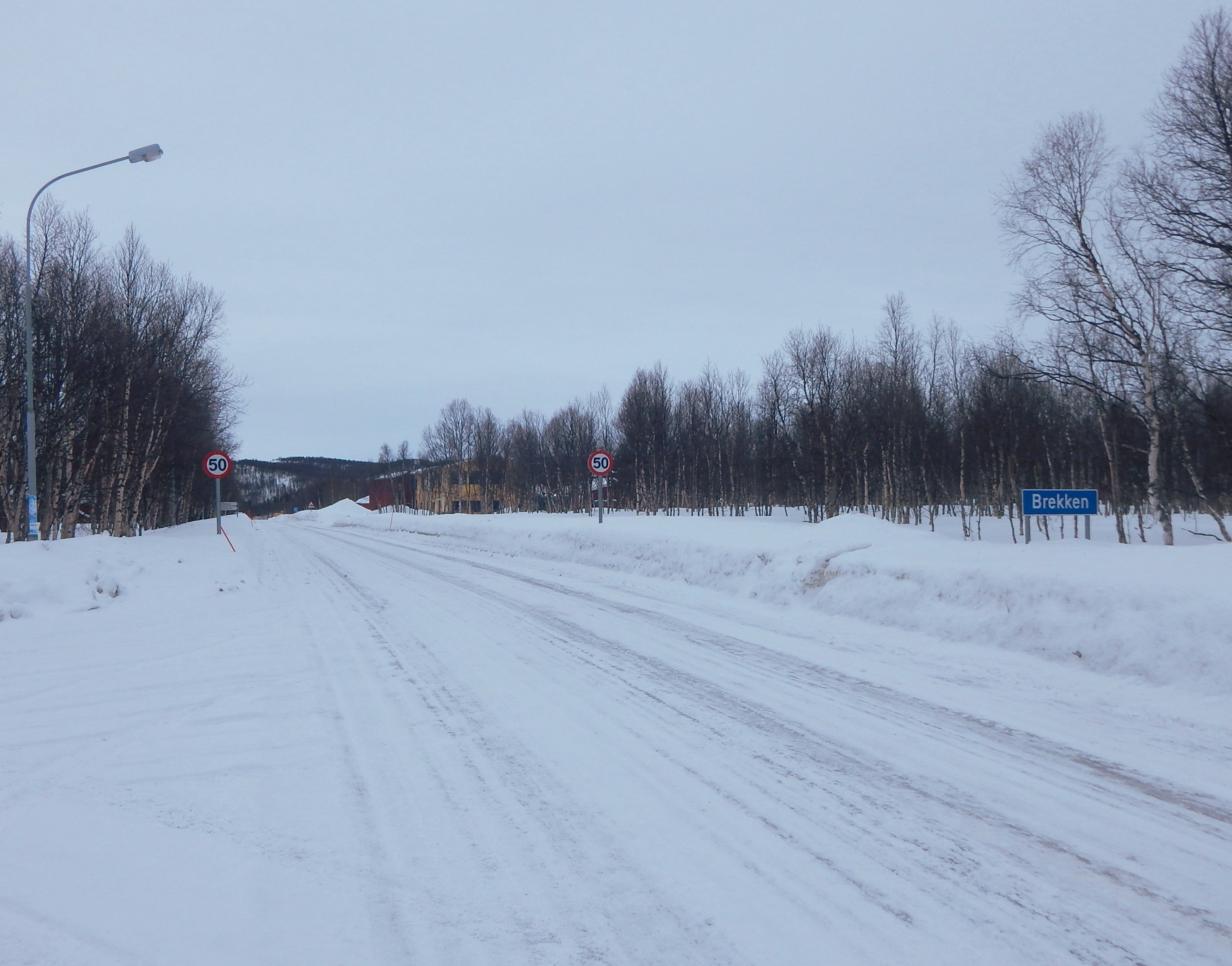
View of the Brekken area

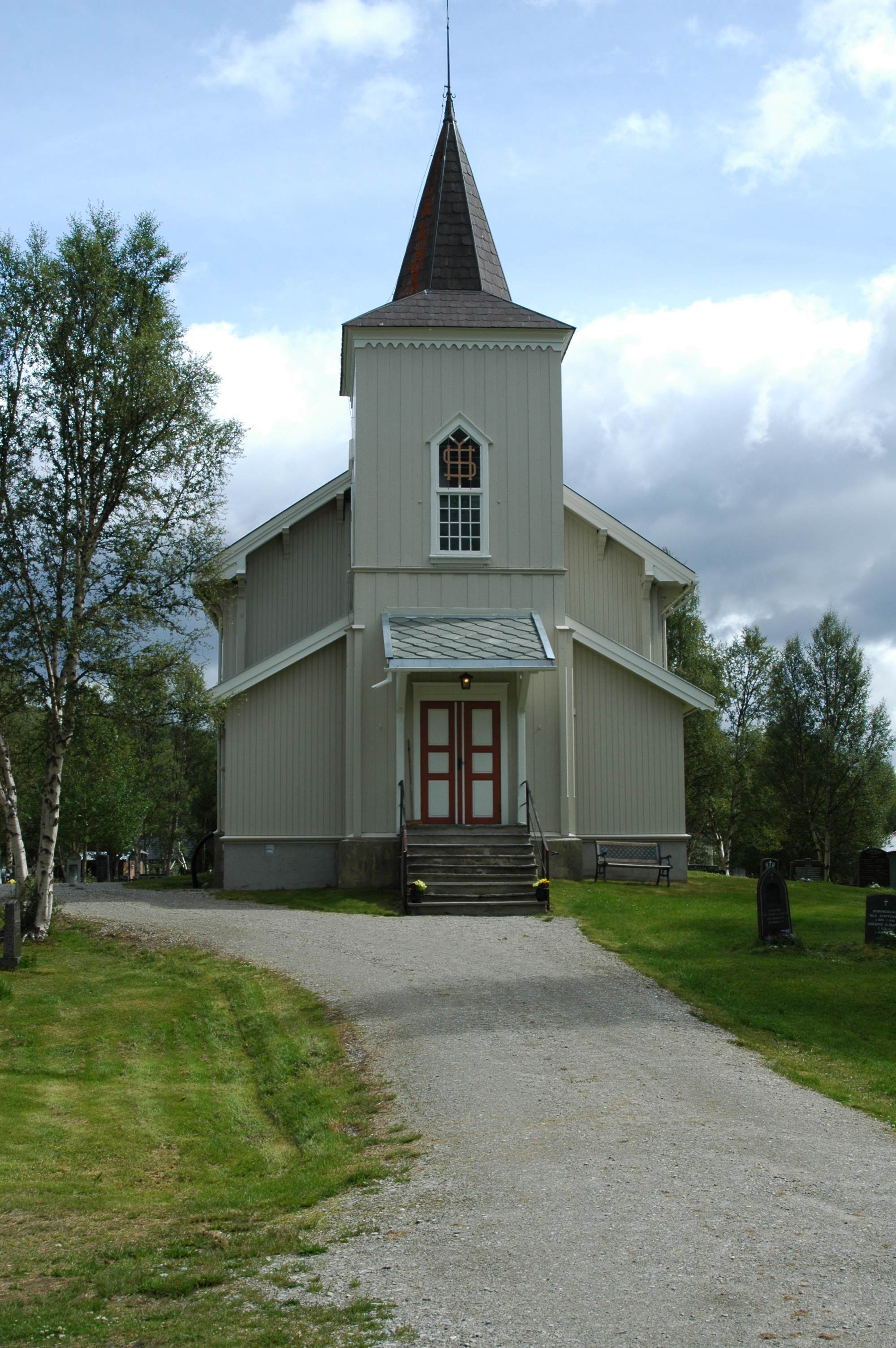
View of Brekken Church

The parish of Brekken was established as a municipality on 1 January 1926 when the large Røros Municipality was split into four parts: Brekken Municipality (population: 1,098) in the northeast, Glåmos Municipality (population: 983) in the north, Røros landsogn (population: 701) in the south and west, and the central area surrounding the town of Røros (population: 2,284) remained as a much smaller Røros Municipality.

During the 1960s, there were many municipal mergers across Norway due to the work of the Schei Committee. On 1 January 1964, Brekken Municipality (population: 964), Glåmos Municipality (population: 700), and Røros landsogn (population: 482) were all merged with Røros Municipality (population: 3,063) to form a new, larger Røros Municipality.

=== Name ===
The municipality is named after the village of Brekken (Old Norse: Brekka) since the Brekken Church was built there. The name comes from the word brekka which means "hill".

=== Churches ===
The Church of Norway had one parish (sokn) within Brekken Municipality. At the time of the municipal dissolution, it was part of the Røros prestegjeld and the Gauldal prosti (deanery) in the Diocese of Nidaros.

Churches in Brekken Municipality
Parish (sokn)	Church name	Location of the church	Year built
Brekken	Brekken Church	Brekken	1878

== Geography ==
Brekken Municipality was located along the border with Sweden. Tydal Municipality was located to the north, Ålen Municipality was to the northeast, Glåmos Municipality was to the west, and Røros landsogn was to the west and south. The highest point in the municipality was the 1,561.38-metre (5,122.6 ft) tall mountain Storviglen which sits about 2 kilometres (1.2 mi) west of the border with Sweden.

== Government ==
While it existed, Brekken Municipality was responsible for primary education (through 10th grade), outpatient health services, senior citizen services, welfare and other social services, zoning, economic development, and municipal roads and utilities. The municipality was governed by a municipal council of directly elected representatives. The mayor was indirectly elected by a vote of the municipal council. The municipality was under the jurisdiction of the Frostating Court of Appeal.

=== Municipal council ===
The municipal council (Herredsstyre) of Brekken Municipality was made up of 13 representatives that were elected to four year terms. The tables below show the historical composition of the council by political party.

Brekken herredsstyre 1959–1963
Party name (in Norwegian)	Number of representatives
Labour Party (Arbeiderpartiet)	8
Joint List(s) of Non-Socialist Parties (Borgerlige Felleslister)	5
Total number of members:	13

Brekken herredsstyre 1955–1959
Party name (in Norwegian)	Number of representatives
Labour Party (Arbeiderpartiet)	8
Joint List(s) of Non-Socialist Parties (Borgerlige Felleslister)	5
Total number of members:	13

Brekken herredsstyre 1951–1955
Party name (in Norwegian)	Number of representatives
Labour Party (Arbeiderpartiet)	6
Joint List(s) of Non-Socialist Parties (Borgerlige Felleslister)	6
Total number of members:	12

Brekken herredsstyre 1947–1951
Party name (in Norwegian)	Number of representatives
Labour Party (Arbeiderpartiet)	7
Joint List(s) of Non-Socialist Parties (Borgerlige Felleslister)	5
Total number of members:	12

Brekken herredsstyre 1945–1947
Party name (in Norwegian)	Number of representatives
Labour Party (Arbeiderpartiet)	7
Local List(s) (Lokale lister)	5
Total number of members:	12

Brekken herredsstyre 1937–1941*
Party name (in Norwegian)	Number of representatives
Labour Party (Arbeiderpartiet)	6
Joint List(s) of Non-Socialist Parties (Borgerlige Felleslister)	6
Total number of members:	12
Note: Due to the German occupation of Norway during World War II, no elections were held for new municipal councils until after the war ended in 1945.

=== Mayors ===
The mayor (Norwegian: ordfører) of Brekken Municipality was the political leader of the municipality and the chairperson of the municipal council. Here is a list of people who held this position:

- 1926–1936: Svend N. Borgos (Bp)
- 1937–1942: Jacob J. Ryen (Ap)
- 1942–1945: Anders J. Stensaas (NS)
- 1945–1955: Jacob J. Ryen (Ap)
- 1956–1963: Per A. Strickert (Ap)

== See also ==
- List of former municipalities of Norway
