= Røros landsogn =

Former municipality in Trøndelag, Norway

Rural Municipality of Røros Røros landsogn
- Former municipality
- Sør-Trøndelag within Norway

- Røros landsogn within Sør-Trøndelag
- Coordinates: 62°30′30″N 11°32′49″E
- Country: Norway
- County: Sør-Trøndelag
- District: Gauldalen
- Established: 1 Jan 1926
  - Preceded by: Røros Municipality
- Disestablished: 1 Jan 1964
  - Succeeded by: Røros Municipality
- Administrative centre: Røros

Government
  - Mayor (1960–1963): Oddleif Vold (Ap)

Area (upon dissolution)
  - Total: 729.3 km^{2} (281.6 sq mi)
  - Rank: #126 in Norway
- Highest elevation: 1,128.4 m (3,702 ft)

Population (1963)
  - Total: 513
  - Rank: #676 in Norway
  - Density: 0.7/km^{2} (1.8/sq mi)
  - Change (10 years): ▼ −24%
- Demonym: Rørosing

Official language
  - Norwegian form: Neutral
- Time zone: UTC+01:00 (CET)
  - Summer (DST): UTC+02:00 (CEST)
- ISO 3166 code: NO-1641

Røros landsogn (lit. 'Røros rural parish') is a former municipality in the old Sør-Trøndelag county in Norway. The 729-square-kilometre (281 sq mi) municipality encompassed the southern part of the what is now Røros Municipality in Trøndelag county. The municipality nearly surrounded the small enclave that was the mining town of Røros and it stretched all the way southeast to the lake Femunden and the Swedish border. The administrative centre of the municipality was located in the town of Røros where Røros Church is located.

Prior to its dissolution in 1964, the 729.3-square-kilometre (281.6 sq mi) municipality was the 126th largest by area out of the 689 municipalities in Norway. Røros landsogn was the 676th most populous municipality in Norway with a population of about 513. The municipality's population density was 0.7 inhabitants per square kilometre (1.8/sq mi) and its population had decreased by 24% over the previous 10-year period.

== General information ==
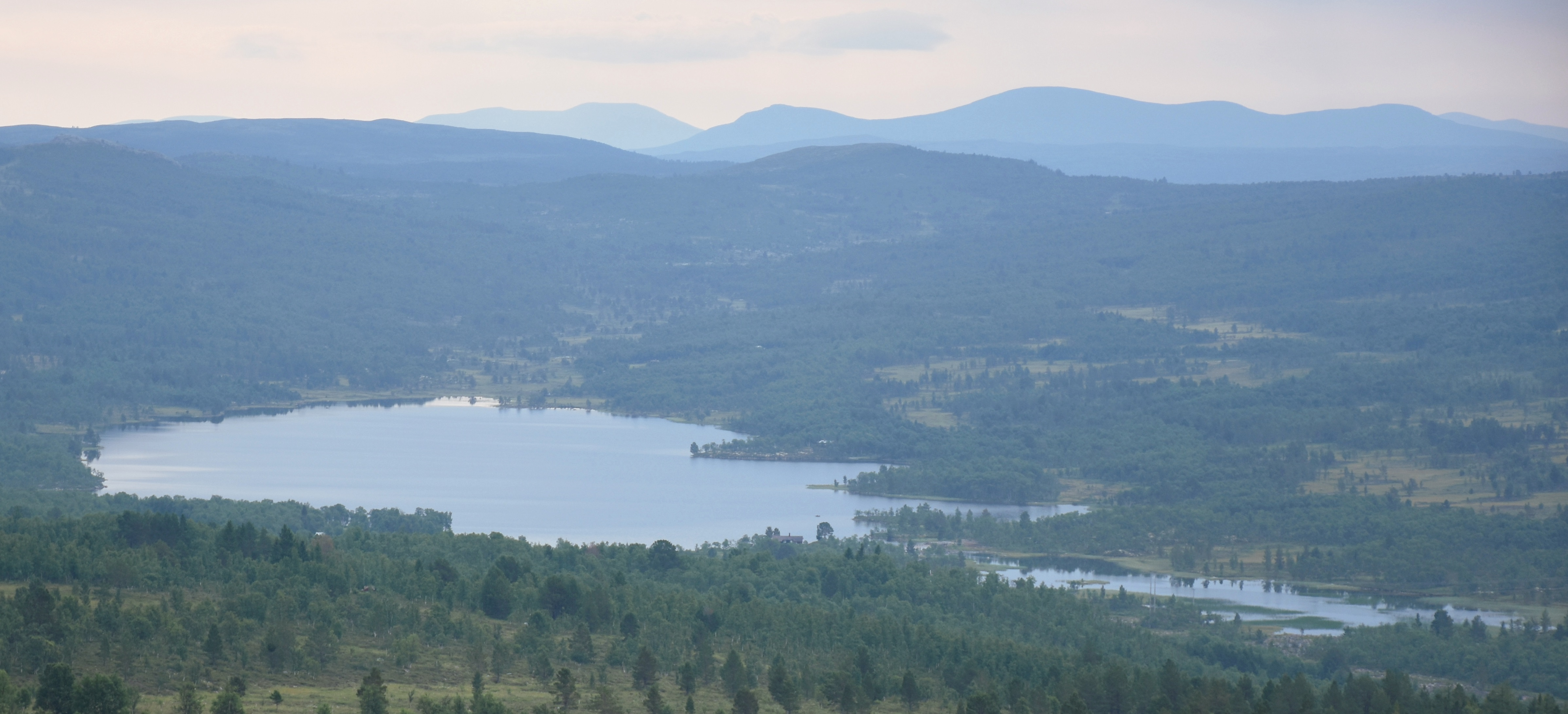
Area around the lake Hittersjøen, near Hitterdalen

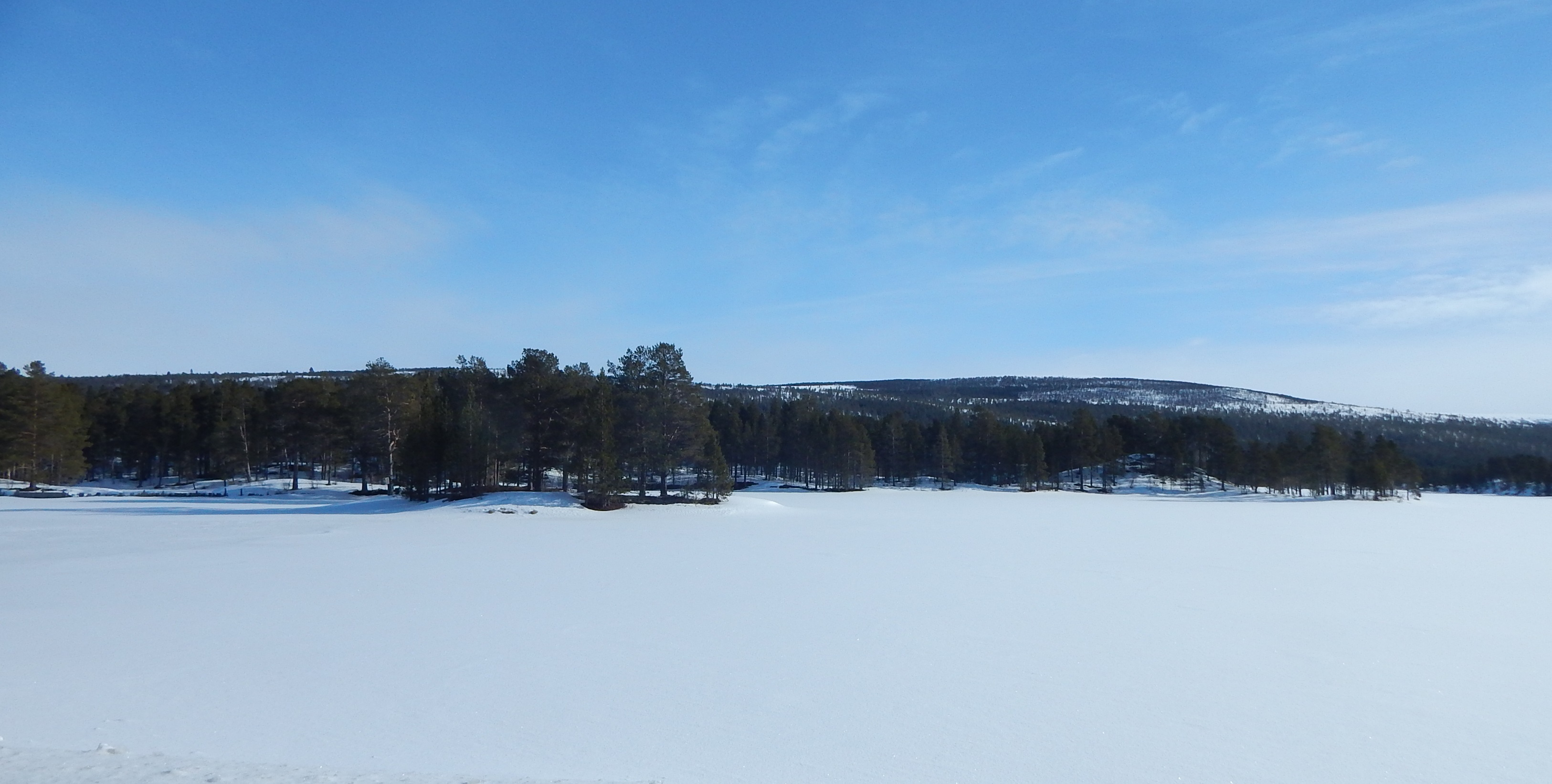
View of the lake Rambergssjøen in March

The rural part of the parish of Røros was established as Røros landsogn municipality on 1 January 1926 when the large Røros Municipality was split into four parts: Brekken Municipality (population: 1,098) in the northeast, Glåmos Municipality (population: 983) in the north, Røros landsogn (population: 701) in the south and west, and the central area surrounding the town of Røros (population: 2,284) remained as a much smaller Røros Municipality.

During the 1960s, there were many municipal mergers across Norway due to the work of the Schei Committee. On 1 January 1964, Brekken Municipality (population: 964), Glåmos Municipality (population: 700), and Røros landsogn (population: 482) were all merged with Røros Municipality (population: 3,063) to form a new, larger Røros Municipality.

=== Name ===
The municipality is named after the town of Røros and the name landsogn means "rural district", hence it is the rural district surrounding the town of Røros. The town is named after the old Røros farm (Old Norse: Røyðaróss). The first element comes from the local river name Røa (Røyðr) which has an unknown meaning. The last element comes from os which means "mouth of a river" (the small river Røa runs into the great river Glåma here).

=== Churches ===
The Church of Norway had one parish (sokn) that encompassed both Røros Municipality and Røros landsogn. At the time of the municipal dissolution, this municipality was part of the Røros prestegjeld and the Gauldal prosti (deanery) in the Diocese of Nidaros.

Churches in Røros landsogn
Parish (sokn)	Church name	Location of the church	Year built
Røros	Røros Church	Bergstaden Røros	1784
Røros	Røros Chapel	Bergstaden Røros	1962
Røros	Hitterdal Chapel*	Hitterdalen	1959
*Note: This chapel was the only one actually located within Røros landsogn. The others were located in the neighboring Røros Municipality.

== Geography ==
Røros landsogn was a rural municipality located to the west, south, and east of Røros Municipality. Ålen Municipality, Glåmos Municipality, and Brekken Municipality were all located to the north. Sweden was located to the east, and Os Municipality (in Hedmark county) was located to the south. The highest point in the municipality was the 1,128.4-metre (3,702 ft) tall mountain Kvernskardet, just north of the border with Os Municipality in the neighboring Hedmark county.

== Government ==
While it existed, Røros landsogn was responsible for primary education (through 10th grade), outpatient health services, senior citizen services, welfare and other social services, zoning, economic development, and municipal roads and utilities. The municipality was governed by a municipal council of directly elected representatives. The mayor was indirectly elected by a vote of the municipal council. The municipality was under the jurisdiction of the Frostating Court of Appeal.

=== Municipal council ===
The municipal council (Herredsstyre) of Røros landsogn was made up of 13 representatives that were elected to four year terms. The tables below show the historical composition of the council by political party.

Røros landsogn herredsstyre 1959–1963
Party name (in Norwegian)	Number of representatives
Labour Party (Arbeiderpartiet)	8
Local List(s) (Lokale lister)	5
Total number of members:	13

Røros landsogn herredsstyre 1955–1959
Party name (in Norwegian)	Number of representatives
Labour Party (Arbeiderpartiet)	7
Local List(s) (Lokale lister)	6
Total number of members:	13

Røros landsogn herredsstyre 1951–1955
Party name (in Norwegian)	Number of representatives
Labour Party (Arbeiderpartiet)	7
Local List(s) (Lokale lister)	5
Total number of members:	12

Røros landsogn herredsstyre 1947–1951
Party name (in Norwegian)	Number of representatives
Labour Party (Arbeiderpartiet)	7
Communist Party (Kommunistiske Parti)	2
Farmers' Party (Bondepartiet)	3
Total number of members:	12

Røros landsogn herredsstyre 1945–1947
Party name (in Norwegian)	Number of representatives
Labour Party (Arbeiderpartiet)	6
Communist Party (Kommunistiske Parti)	2
Local List(s) (Lokale lister)	4
Total number of members:	12

Røros landsogn herredsstyre 1937–1941*
Party name (in Norwegian)	Number of representatives
Labour Party (Arbeiderpartiet)	7
Local List(s) (Lokale lister)	5
Total number of members:	12
Note: Due to the German occupation of Norway during World War II, no elections were held for new municipal councils until after the war ended in 1945.

=== Mayors ===
The mayor (Norwegian: ordfører) of Røros landsogn was the political leader of the municipality and the chairperson of the municipal council. Here is a list of people who held this position:

- 1926–1931: Hans T. Galaaen (Bp)
- 1932–1933: John O. Indseth (Bp)
- 1934–1941: Per A. Sundt (Ap)
- 1942–1945: Haldor Thomassen Galaaen (NS)
- 1945–1951: Jens Tørresdal (Ap)
- 1952–1955: Per A. Sundt (Ap)
- 1956–1959: Bernhard Solli (Ap)
- 1960–1963: Oddleif Vold (Ap)

== See also ==
- List of former municipalities of Norway
