= Blagden =

Blagden may refer to:

- Charles Blagden (1748–1820), British physician and scientist
- Charles Otto Blagden (1864–1949), English linguist
- Claude Martin Blagden (1874–1952), Anglican bishop of Peterborough
- George Blagden Westcott (1753–1798), Royal Navy officer
- Isa Blagden (1816 or 1817 – 1873), novelist and poet
- Joanna Noëlle Blagden Levesque or JoJo (singer) (born 1990), American singer-songwriter and actress
- Matthew Blagden Hale (1811–1895), first bishop of Perth, later bishop of Brisbane
- Paddy Blagden (born 1935), British Army officer and UN expert on mine clearance

== See also ==
- Blagdon (disambiguation)
- Bolagen
