= Brekken Church =

- Brekken kirke
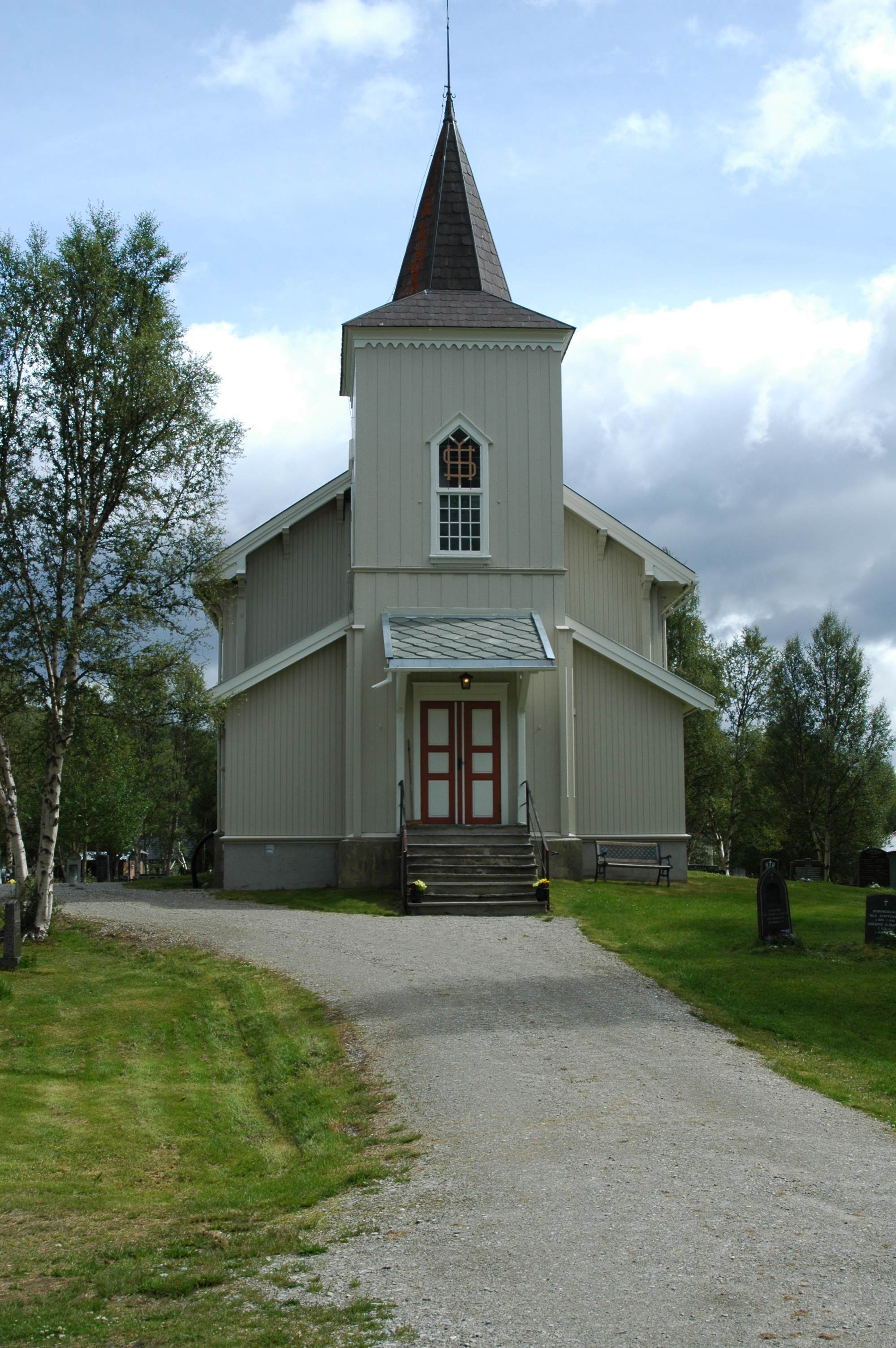
- View of the church
- Brekken Church
- 62.647365909°N 11.872519254°E
- Location: Røros Municipality, Trøndelag
- Country: Norway
- Denomination: Church of Norway
- Churchmanship: Evangelical Lutheran

History
- Status: Parish church
- Founded: 1878
- Consecrated: 17 July 1878

Architecture
- Functional status: Active
- Architect: Jacob Wilhelm Nordan
- Architectural type: Long church
- Completed: 1878 (148 years ago)

Specifications
- Capacity: 200
- Materials: Wood

Administration
- Diocese: Nidaros bispedømme
- Deanery: Gauldal prosti
- Parish: Brekken
- Norwegian Cultural Heritage Site
- Type: Church
- Status: Listed
- ID: 83950

Brekken Church (Norwegian: Brekken kirke) is a parish church of the Church of Norway in Røros Municipality in Trøndelag county, Norway. It is located in the village of Brekken, at the eastern end of the lake Aursunden. It is the church for the Brekken parish which is part of the Gauldal prosti (deanery) in the Diocese of Nidaros. The gray, wooden church was built in a long church style in 1878 using plans drawn up by the architect Jacob Wilhelm Nordan. The building can hold about 200 people.

== History ==
The people of the Brekken area had been requesting their own chapel for some time. On 21 January 1873, a royal decree was issued that authorized the construction of a new chapel in Brekken. Jacob Wilhelm Nordan made the designs for the new building and from 1876-1878 the new church was constructed. The new building was consecrated on 17 July 1878 by the Bishop Andreas Grimelund. Later, the chapel was upgraded to being a full parish church.

The altarpiece was painted by Waldemar Wilberg in 1880, it was a copy of Adolph Tidemand's altarpiece of Jesus' baptism that was located in the Trinity Church in Kristiania.

== See also ==
- List of churches in Nidaros
