= Bergstad =

Obsolete classification of towns in Norway

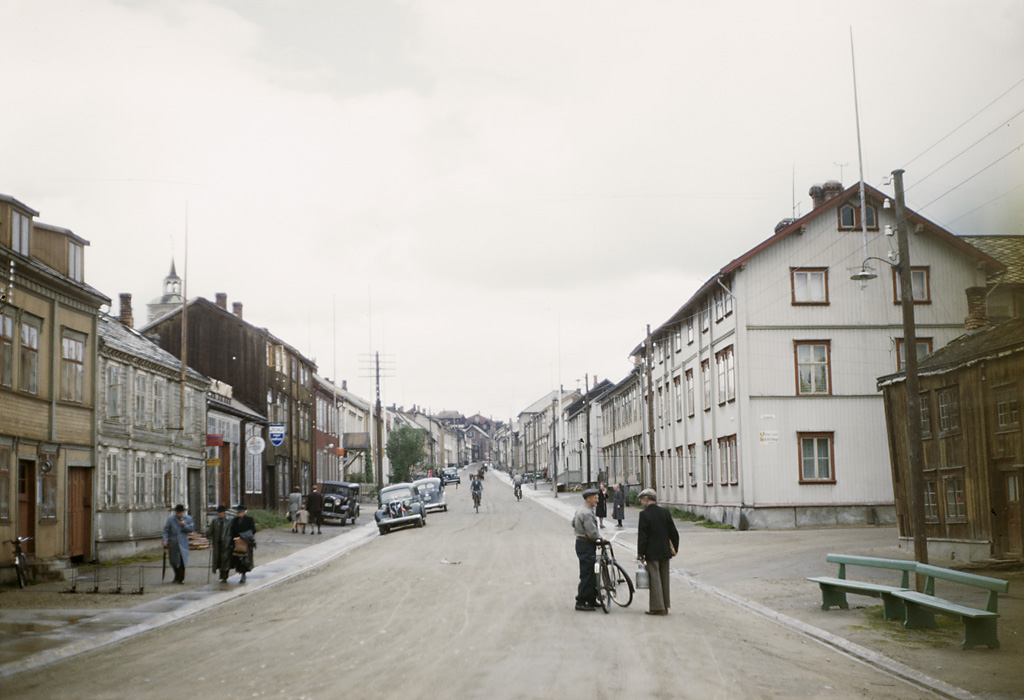

Bergstad or Bergstaden is an old classification for a mining town in Norway. In the past, a bergstad had its own laws, so-called mountain laws. Today, the town of Røros is the only remaining bergstad in Norway.

Before 1683, the mountain laws in Norway followed those from the Electorate of Saxony which were enacted in the 14th century. On 23 June 1683, the Kingdom of Denmark-Norway enacted their own mountain laws which authorized later royal ordinances and mountain privileges for bergstad in Norway. In Norway, only Kongsberg and Røros were ever given the status of bergstad under the law. In 1802, the bergstad of Kongsberg was granted formal town status as a kjøpstad. Since then, the town of Røros is the only bergstad in Norway. Røros Municipality considered designating the mining town as a regular city (like many other places in Norway) but the municipal council concluded that it was more unique to still present itself as a bergstad mining town rather than as a city. Bergstaden Røros and surrounding areas are a UNESCO world heritage site.
