= Glåmos =

Village in Røros Municipality, Norway

Glåmos: Glåmos (Norwegian); Kloemege (Southern Sami)
- Village
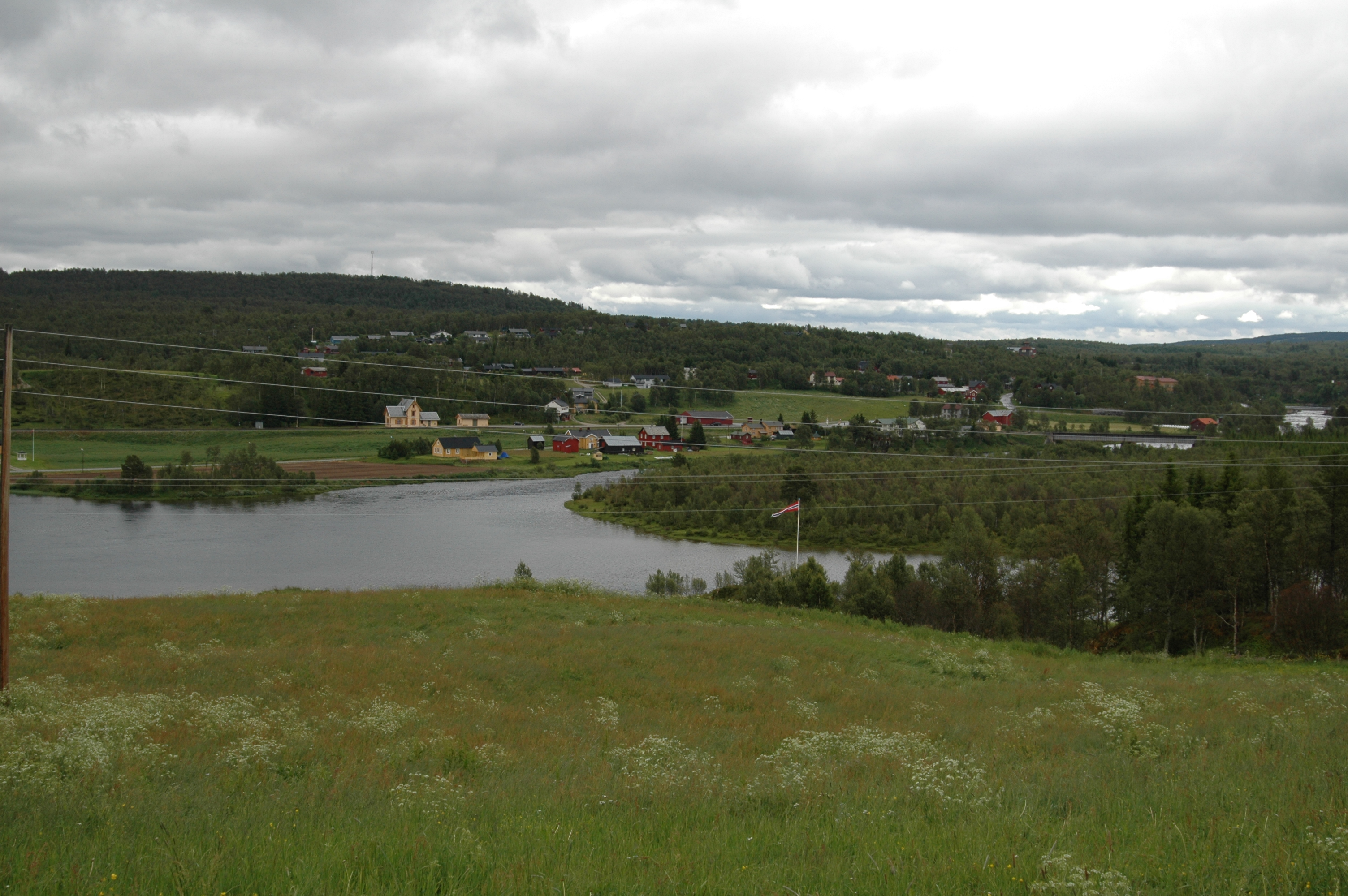
- View of the village
- Interactive map of Glåmos
- Location within Trøndelag Location within Norway
- Coordinates: 62.6714°N 11.4288°E
- Country: Norway
- Region: Central Norway
- County: Trøndelag
- District: Gauldalen
- Municipality: Røros Municipality

Area
  - Total: 0.34 km^{2} (0.13 sq mi)
- Elevation: 640 m (2,100 ft)

Population (2000)
  - Total: 202
  - Density: 594/km^{2} (1,540/sq mi)
- Time zone: UTC+01:00 (CET)
  - Summer (DST): UTC+02:00 (CEST)
- Post Code: 7372 Glåmos

Glåmos (Norwegian) or Kloemege (Southern Sami) is a mountain village in Røros Municipality in Trøndelag county, Norway. The village is located along the river Glåma, just west of the lake Aursunden, and about 12 kilometres (7.5 mi) north of the town of Røros. It is the location of the Glåmos Church and the Glåmos Station which sits along the Rørosbanen railway.

The 0.34-square-kilometre (84-acre) village had a population (2000) of 202 and a population density of 594 inhabitants per square kilometre (1,540/sq mi). Since 2000, the population and area data for this village area has not been separately tracked by Statistics Norway.

== Name ==
The first element of the name is the name of the river Glåma and the last element is os meaning the 'starting point of a river'. The river Glåma is considered to start near here at the end of the lake Aursunden.

== History ==
The village has several old copper mines located nearby that used to supply the Røros Copper Works in the town of Røros. In the hills immediately north-west of the village lies Nordgruvefeltet ("the North Mine Field"), one of two principal mining districts that supplied Røros Copper Works for more than three centuries. The Arvedal Mine opened in 1657, and by the late 1800s the adjoining Kongens Gruve ("King’s Mine") employed almost 350 men, complete with its own post office, shops and a mountainside school. Output shifted from copper pyrite to massive pyrite ore once the Røros Line (1877) and a narrow-gauge industrial line (1886) allowed bulk transport. Operations declined after the First World War and were finally abandoned in 1945, but the shafts, barracks and tramway traces around Glåmos remain visible reminders of an industrial community carved out of the high plateau.

The village was the administrative centre of the old Glåmos Municipality which existed from 1926 until 1964.

== Infrastructure ==
The headwaters of the Glåma are exploited for hydropower. Kuråsfossen kraftverk, built at the river's outlet from Aursunden, entered service in 1896 and is regarded as Norway's oldest preserved generating station. Its pioneering three-phase transmission line carried electricity 24 km to the King's and Christianus Sextus mines, enabling early electrification of underground drilling and ore-hoisting. A major extension completed in 1952 now harnesses a 48 m drop and produces around 60 GWh annually. To support the plant and reduce downstream flooding, Parliament approved regulation of Aursunden in 1921; the finished dam (1924) raised the lake by nearly 6 m and created a 215 million cubic metres storage reservoir, making Glåmos a key node in the Glomma water-management scheme.

== Notable people ==
Notable people that were born or lived in Glåmos include:

- Monicha Nergaard (born 1968), an archer
