= Solbergfoss Hydroelectric Power Station =

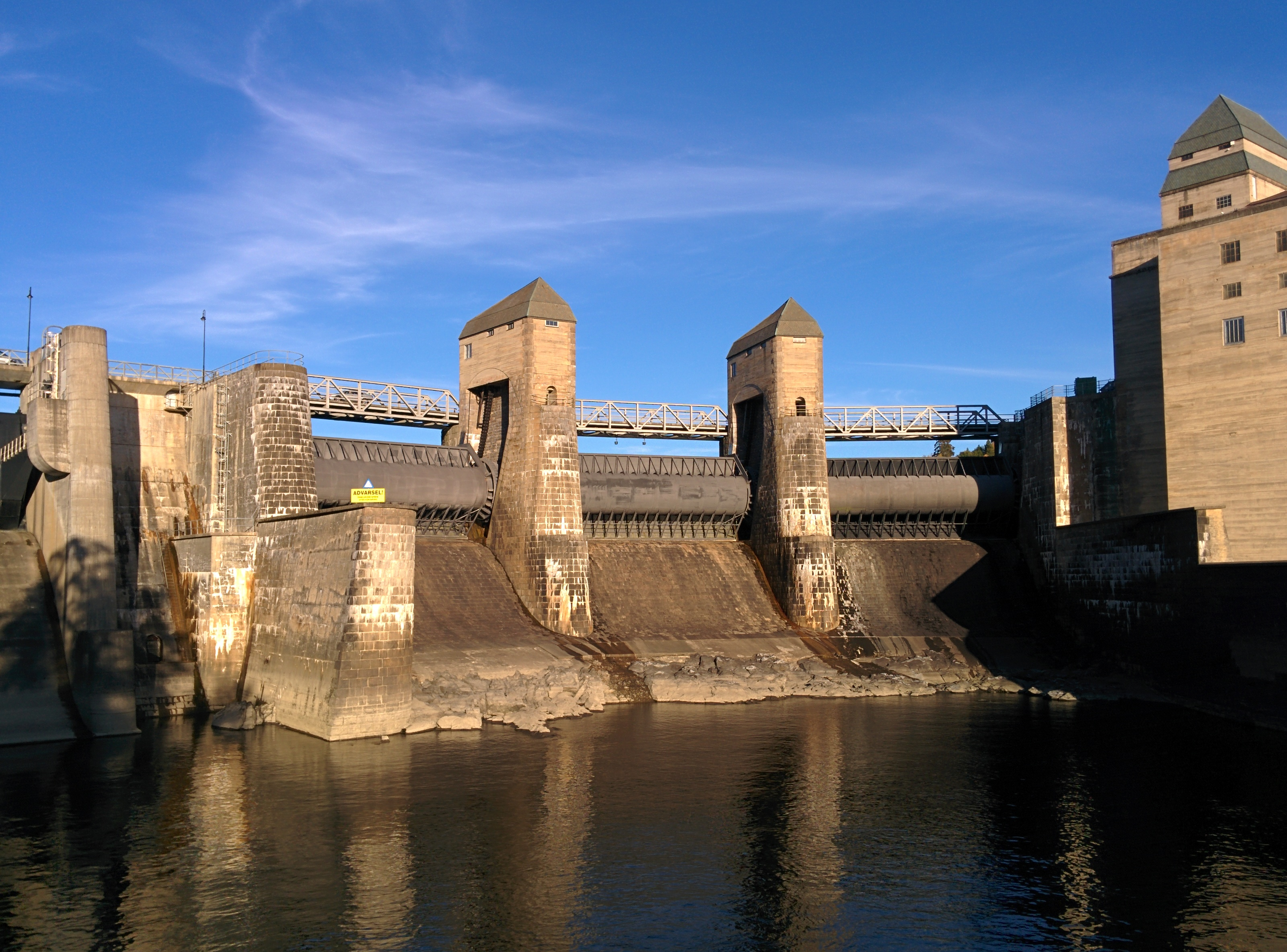

- Location within Østfold Location within Norway
- Official name: Solbergfoss kraftverk
- Location: Indre Østfold, Norway
- Coordinates: 59.637092°N 11.155221°E
- Purpose: Power
- Status: Operational
- Construction began: I: 1913; II: 1979
- Opening date: I: 1924; II: 1985
- Owners: E-CO Energi, Statkraft
- Operator: E-CO Energi

Dam and spillways
- Type of dam: Concrete gravity dam
- Impounds: Glomma
- Spillway type: Over the dam

Power Station
- Commission date: I: 1924; II: 1985
- Hydraulic head: 21 m
- Turbines: I: 13 Francis-type; II: 1 Kaplan-type
- Installed capacity: I: 108 MW; II: 100 MW
- Annual generation: I: 350 GWh; II: 550 GWh

Solbergfoss Hydroelectric Power Station (Norwegian: Solbergfoss kraftverk) is a run-of-the-river hydroelectric power station on the Glomma, in Indre Østfold municipality, Østfold county, Norway.

Construction of the power station began in 1913. It was operational in 1924. Solbergfoss is owned by E-CO Energi (64,4%) and Statkraft (35,6%).

== Dam ==
Solbergfoss Dam is a concrete gravity dam.

== Power station ==
The hydraulic head is 21 m.

=== Solbergfoss I ===
The power station contains 13 Francis turbine-generators. The total nameplate capacity is 108 MW. Its average annual generation is 350 GWh. Solbergfoss I was built from 1913 until 1924.

=== Solbergfoss II ===
The power station contains 1 Kaplan turbine-generator. The total nameplate capacity is 100 MW. Its average annual generation is 550 GWh. Solbergfoss II was built from 1979 until 1985.
