= Bolagen =

Lake in Røros, Norway

- Båålege (Southern Sami)
- Interactive map of the lake
- Location: Røros Municipality, Trøndelag
- Coordinates: 62.6191°N 11.9587°E
- Basin countries: Norway
- Max. length: 3 kilometres (1.9 mi)
- Max. width: 1 kilometre (0.62 mi)
- Surface area: 2.5 km^{2} (0.97 sq mi)
- Shore length^{1}: 7.95 kilometres (4.94 mi)
- Surface elevation: 789 metres (2,589 ft)
- References: NVE
- ^{1} Shore length is not a well-defined measure.

Bolagen (Southern Sami: Båålege) is a lake in Røros Municipality in Trøndelag county, Norway. The 2.5-square-kilometre (0.97 sq mi) lake is located about 4.5 kilometres (2.8 mi) southeast of the village of Brekken and about 4 kilometres (2.5 mi) west of the border with Sweden. The large lake Aursunden lies about 4 kilometres (2.5 mi) to the west of Bolagen.

== See also ==
- List of lakes in Norway
