= Blagdon (disambiguation) =

Blagdon may refer to

in England

- Blagdon, Paignton, a historic estate in Devon
- Blagdon, a village in North Somerset
- Blagdon, a village near Taunton, Somerset, now generally known as Blagdon Hill
- Blagdon Hall, Northumberland

in New Zealand

- Blagdon, New Zealand

== See also ==
- Blagden (disambiguation)
