= Brekken =

Village in Røros Municipality, Norway

Brekken: Brekken (Norwegian); Prahke (Southern Sami); Brekkebygd / Brekka
- Village
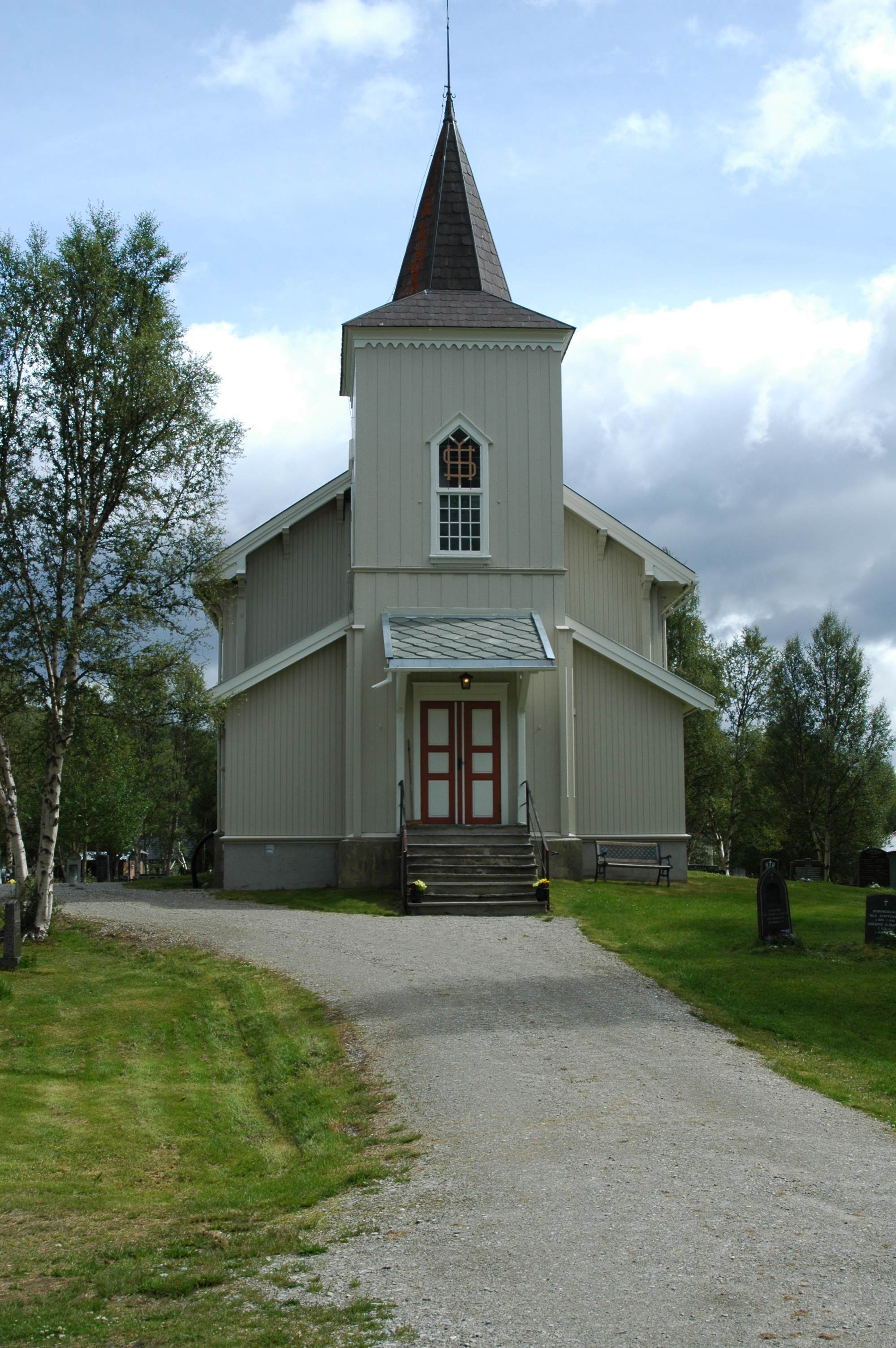
- View of the village church
- Interactive map of Brekken
- Location within Trøndelag Location within Norway
- Coordinates: 62.64839°N 11.86505°E
- Country: Norway
- Region: Central Norway
- County: Trøndelag
- District: Gauldalen
- Municipality: Røros Municipality
- Elevation: 708 m (2,323 ft)
- Time zone: UTC+01:00 (CET)
  - Summer (DST): UTC+02:00 (CEST)
- Post Code: 7370 Brekkebygd

Brekken (Norwegian) or Prahke (Southern Sami) (or less commonly: Brekkebygd or Brekka) is a mountain village in the Røros Municipality in Trøndelag county, Norway. The village is located at the eastern end of the lake Aursunden, just about 11 kilometres (6.8 mi) west of the border with Sweden and about 30 kilometres (19 mi) northeast of the town of Røros.

The village has a school, shop, gas station, post office, bank, sports fields, and Brekken Church. The small Brekken airport opened in August 2009. The mountains around Brekken are easily accessible and offer various hiking opportunities in summer and winter. With all the nearby lakes and rivers, the area abounds in good fishing. The area contains several sites of interest to botanists, geologists and ornithologists. The village was settled in the mid-1600s when the mining industry began in the Røros area.

The village was the administrative centre of the old Brekken Municipality from 1926 until its dissolution in 1964.

== Sports ==
Brekken Idrettslag or Brekken IL is the local multi-sports club. It has sections for football and Nordic skiing. The club was founded in 1933, mostly as a skiing club. Football was added in 1946 and handball in the 1960s; the latter later became defunct. Other former sports include gymnastics and motor sports. The men's football team had stints in the Third Division from 1994 to 1997, and later in a single season, 2000.
