= Glåmdal =

Valley in Innlandet, Norway

Glåmdalen
- Glommadalen
- The area of Innlandet county most commonly called Glåmdalen
- Area: 5,289 square kilometres (2,042 sq mi)

Geology
- Type: River valley

Geography
- Location: Innlandet, Norway
- Coordinates: 60.230°N 12.051°E
- Interactive map of Glåmdalen

Glåmdalen (or Glommadal) is a valley in Innlandet county in Eastern Norway. The valley was formed by the river Glomma (also called Glåma), one of the major rivers for the region. The name "Glåmdalen" is also a newer designation for the traditional district which lies around the river Glomma, although it is most often used to refer to the southern part of the broader valley of Østerdalen.

== Geography ==
The Glåmdalen valley is the valley surrounding the river Glåma, Norway's longest river. The northern end of the valley starts in Røros Municipality at the lake Aursunden and it stretches all the way south to Kongsvinger Municipality where it heads west to Lillestrøm Municipality where it heads south again before flowing out into the sea in Fredrikstad Municipality.

The valley surrounding the river Glåma has different names along its path. It is called the Østerdalen valley from Røros Municipality to Elverum Municipality. From Elverum south to Kongsvinger Municipality, the valley and region is referred to as Solør. As in turns westerly from Kongsvinger until it gets to Nes Municipality in the traditional district of Romerike in Akershus county, it is called the Odalen valley. These designations are all traditional districts, reflecting the designations locals used for their region. The newer term "Glåmdalen" is often used for the Solør and Odalen areas together, while the northern part of the valley is usually referred to as Østerdalen.
