= Glåmos Church =

Church in Trøndelag, Norway

- Glåmos kirke
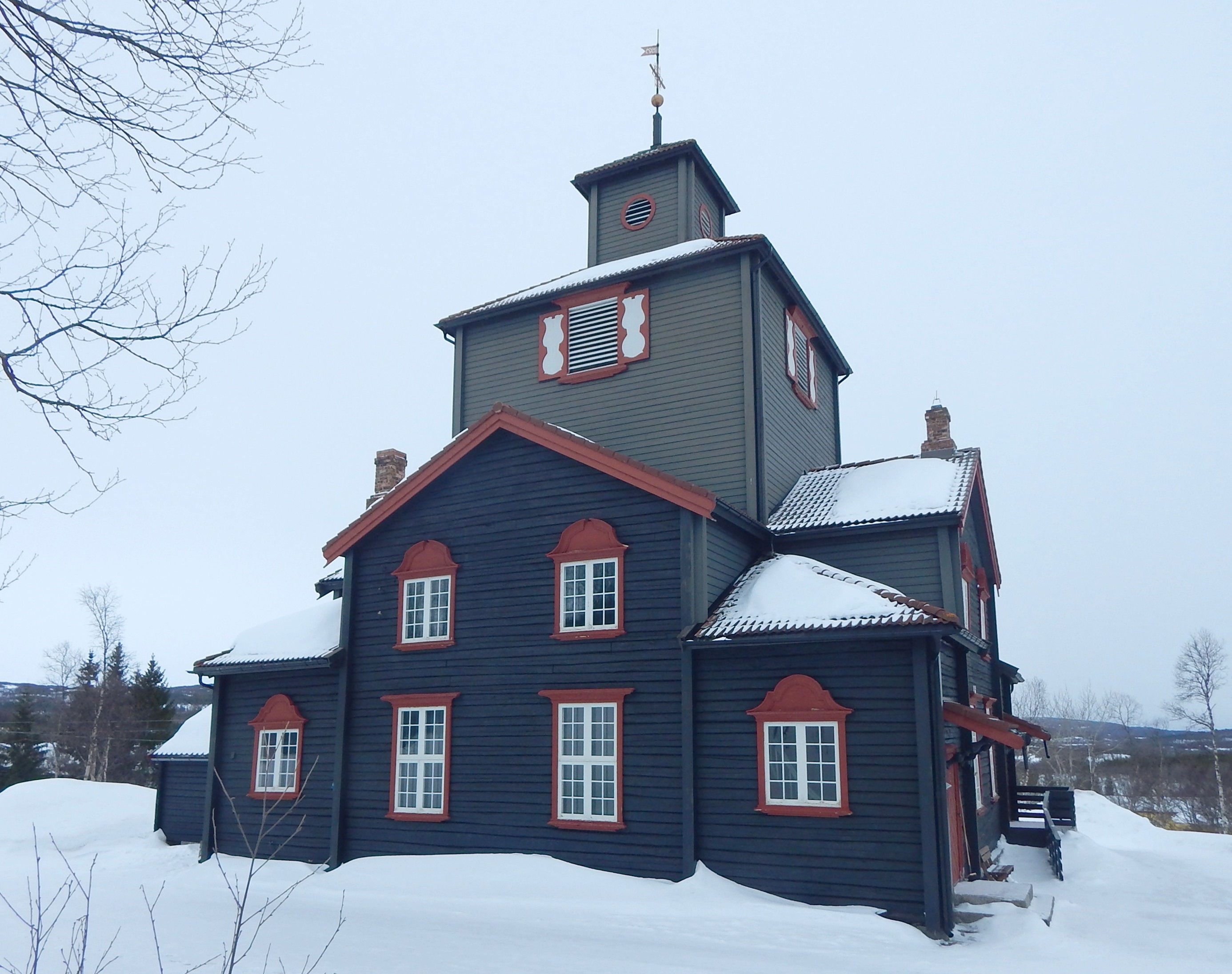
- View of the church
- Glåmos Church
- 62.672843713°N 11.429678499°E
- Location: Røros Municipality, Trøndelag
- Country: Norway
- Denomination: Church of Norway
- Churchmanship: Evangelical Lutheran

History
- Status: Parish church
- Founded: 1926
- Consecrated: 1926

Architecture
- Functional status: Active
- Architect: Claus Hjelte
- Architectural type: Cruciform
- Completed: 1926 (100 years ago)

Specifications
- Capacity: 300
- Materials: Wood

Administration
- Diocese: Nidaros bispedømme
- Deanery: Gauldal prosti
- Parish: Glåmos
- Norwegian Cultural Heritage Site
- Type: Church
- Status: Listed
- ID: 84271

Glåmos Church (Norwegian: Glåmos kirke) is a parish church of the Church of Norway in Røros Municipality, Trøndelag county, Norway. It is located in the village of Glåmos. It is the church for the Glåmos parish which is part of the Gauldal prosti (deanery) in the Diocese of Nidaros.

The brown and red wooden church was built in a cruciform style in 1926 under the direction of the architect Claus Hjelte (1884–1969). The church seats about 300 people.

== See also ==
- List of churches in Nidaros
