= Glomma =

Glomma / Glåma
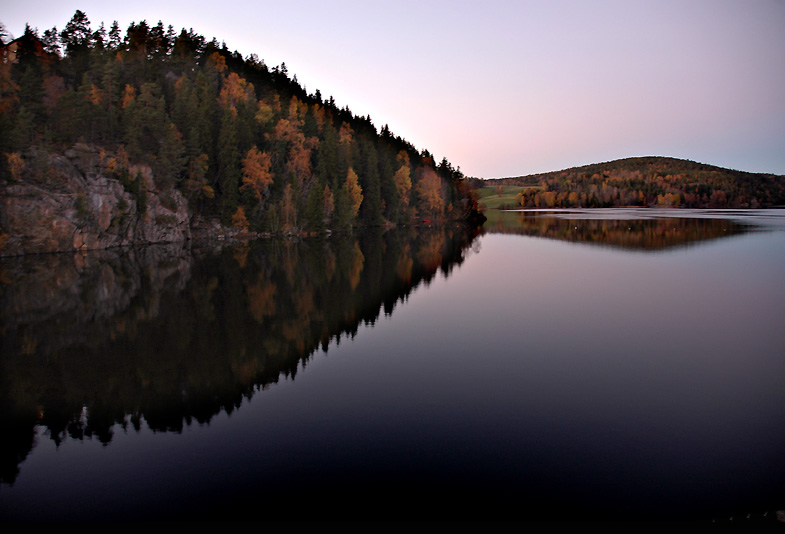
- The Glomma at the Solbergfoss Hydroelectric Power Station

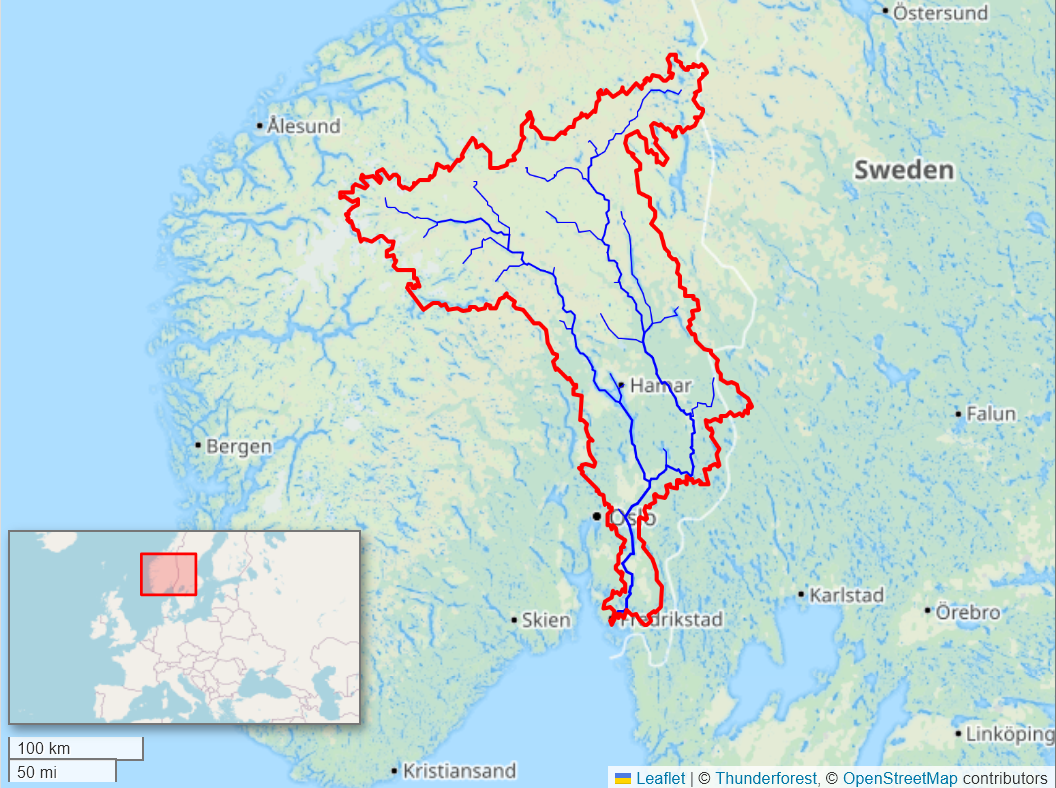
- Map of the Glomma River watershed
- Etymology: Old Norse: Glaumr, from raumr: "noise," "racket"

Location
- Country: Norway

Physical characteristics
- Source: Aursunden
  - location: Røros Municipality, Trøndelag, Norway
  - coordinates: 62°37′06″N 11°48′11″E
  - elevation: 690 m (2,260 ft)
- Mouth: Skagerrak
  - location: Fredrikstad, Østfold, Norway
  - coordinates: 59°13′04″N 10°55′51″E
  - elevation: 0 m (0 ft)
- Length: 621 km (386 mi)
- Basin size: 42,000 km^{2} (16,000 sq mi)
- Discharge
  - average: 720 m^{3}/s (25,000 cu ft/s)
  - maximum: 4,700 m^{3}/s (170,000 cu ft/s)

Basin features
- Tributaries
  - left: Vorma
  - right: Rena
- Designation

Ramsar Wetland
- Official name: Glomådeltaet
- Designated: 12 November 2010
- Reference no.: 1954

The Glomma or Glåma is Norway's longest and most voluminous river. With a total length of 621 kilometres (386 miles), it has a drainage basin that covers 13% of Norway's surface area, all in the southern part of the country.

== Geography ==
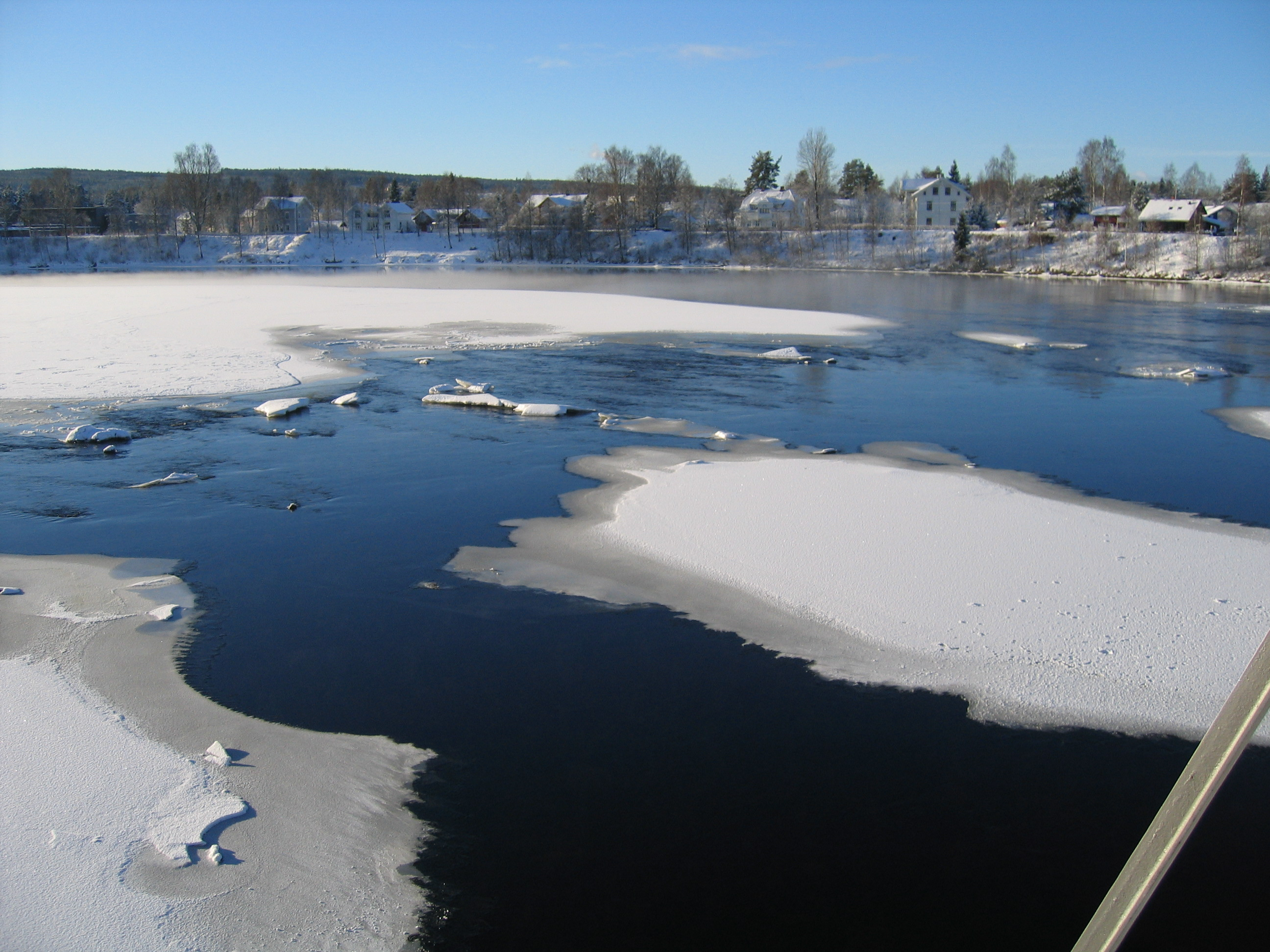
The Glomma at Elverum, during winter

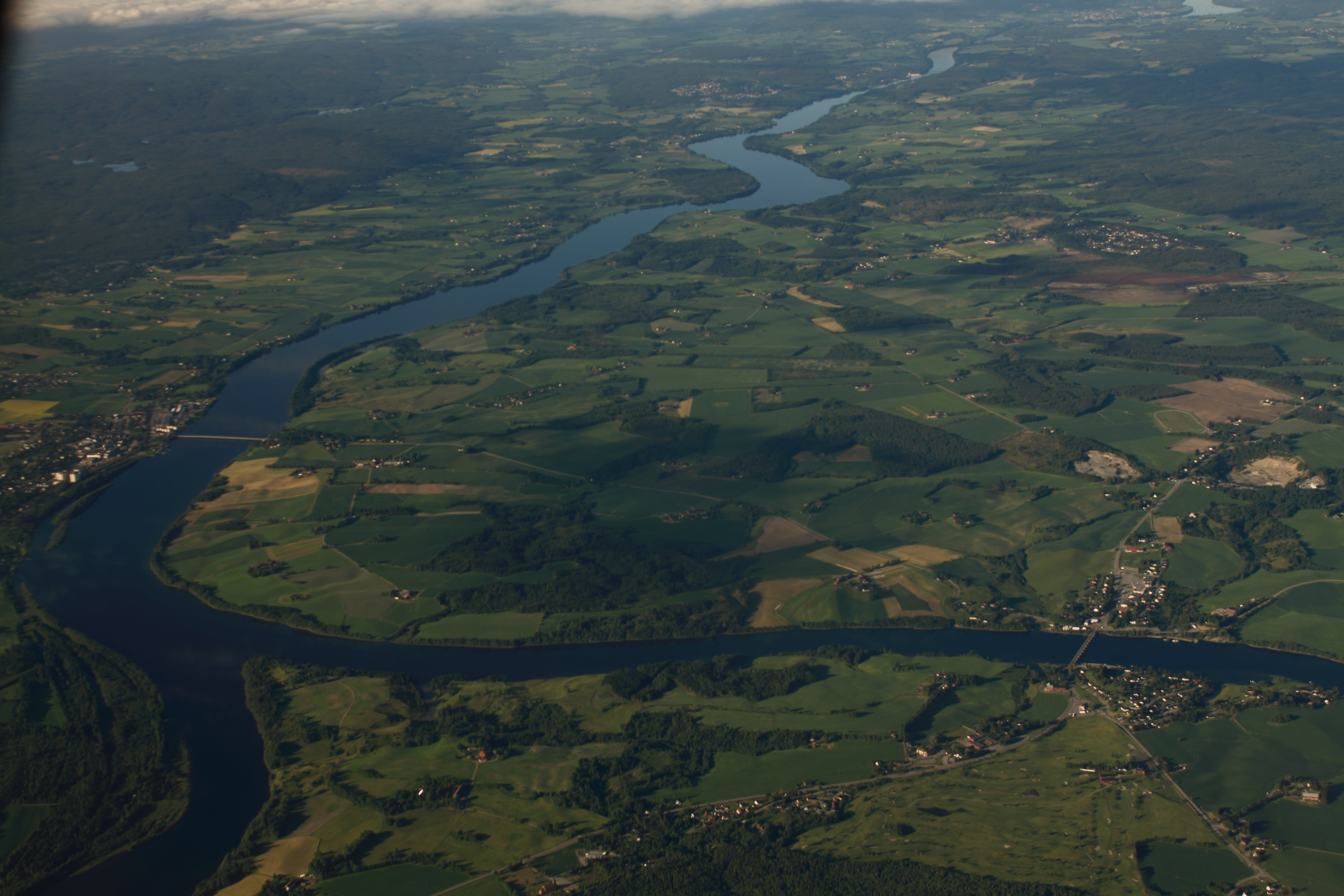
The Vorma, a major tributary, flows into the Glomma just north of Årnes

At its fullest length, the river runs from the lake Aursunden in Røros Municipality in Trøndelag county and runs into the Oslofjord at the town of Fredrikstad in Fredrikstad Municipality in Østfold county. Major tributaries include the Vorma River, which drains Lake Mjøsa, joining the Glomma River at Årnes in Nes Municipality. The large river Lågen flows into Lake Mjøsa, draining the large Gudbrandsdalen valley and significantly increasing the Glomma's flow.

Because it flows through some of the richest forest districts, it has historically been Norway's leading log-floating river. The combination of raw materials, water power, and easy transport has over the centuries encouraged industry along the Glomma. Some of the country's largest manufacturing and processing concerns are found around its mouth, where supplies of timber and hydropower have been backed by excellent port facilities.

The upper limit of the Glomma valley farms is variable, but typically runs about 500 metres (1,600 ft) in Østerdalen, slightly lower than in the Gudbrandsdalen, which reflects the colder climate. The treeline, with a light birch forest, rises to about 900 metres (3,000 ft) in Østerdalen. North of Røros, the forested areas are only on the valley floor.

The upper river valleys of Norwegian rivers have distinctive names which are vestiges of earlier cultural distinctions such as building styles, traditional clothing or bunad and domestic crafts. The upper valley of the Glomma is the Østerdalen (lit. 'the East Valley').

Upon entering Lake Øyeren at Fetsund, the Glomma has formed Europe's largest inland delta which reaches the opposite side of the lake, across its short axis. Some of the vast amount of silt that the Glomma deposits in Lake Øyeren is extracted to manufacture LECA building blocks widely used in the construction of foundations in Norway.

== Name ==
The form Glomma is used in Østfold and Akershus counties, while in Innlandet and Trøndelag counties the river is called (and written) Glåma. An older form was Glaumr; another, in Old Norse, was Raumelfr, meaning a "loud noise" or "thunder" + "river".

Several places are named after the river, for instance Glåmdal and Glåmos.

== See also ==
- Category:Populated places on the Glomma River
