= Aursunden =

Lake in Røros, Norway

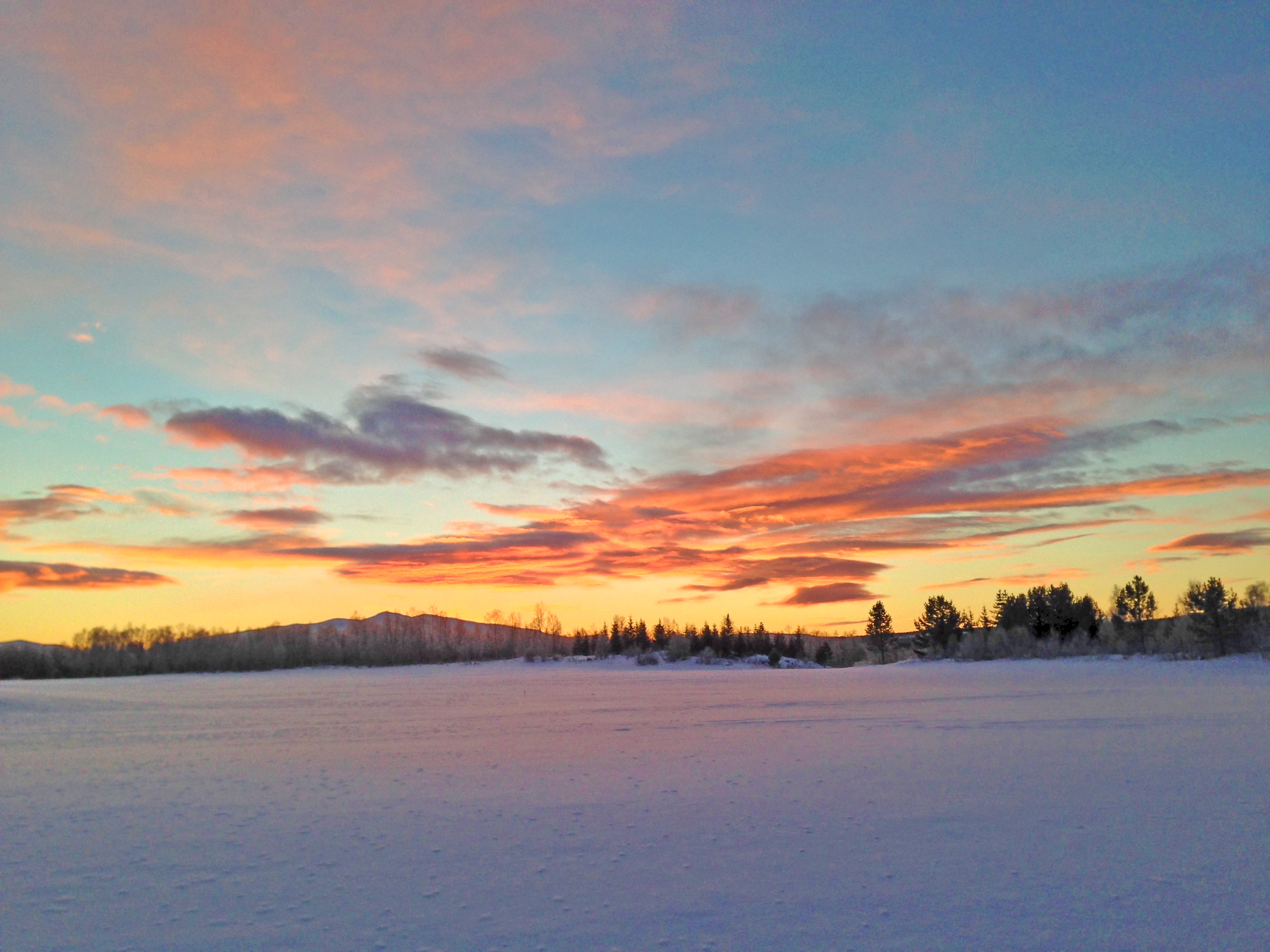
- Aursunden covered in snow
- Interactive map of the lake
- Location: Røros Municipality, Trøndelag
- Coordinates: 62.6678°N 11.6448°E
- Basin countries: Norway
- Max. length: 22 kilometres (14 mi)
- Max. width: 5 kilometres (3.1 mi)
- Surface area: 46.04 km^{2} (17.78 sq mi)
- Max. depth: 52 metres (171 ft)
- Shore length^{1}: 102.98 kilometres (63.99 mi)
- Surface elevation: 690 metres (2,260 ft)
- References: NVE
- ^{1} Shore length is not a well-defined measure.

Aursunden is a lake in Røros Municipality in Trøndelag county, Norway. The village of Brekken lies along the eastern shore and the village of Glåmos lies along the western shore.

There are several inflows to the 46-square-kilometre (18 sq mi) lake including the lakes Rien, Riasten, and Bolagen. The outflow is regulated by a hydropower dam through which water passes into the river Glomma. The lake is about 22 kilometres (14 mi) long and about 5 kilometres (3.1 mi) wide. The deepest part of the lake reaches a depth of 52 metres (171 ft).

Aursunden is often cited as the source of the river Glomma, the longest and largest river in Norway. The actual headwaters are near Aursunden near the start of the Glommadal valley. The locals claim that the headwater of the Glomma river is Mustjønna, a tiny lake about 30 kilometres (19 mi) north of Aursunden.

== See also ==
- List of lakes in Norway
