= Røros (town) =

Town in Trøndelag, Norway

Røros (Norwegian); Plaassja (Southern Sami)
- Municipality; Bergstad
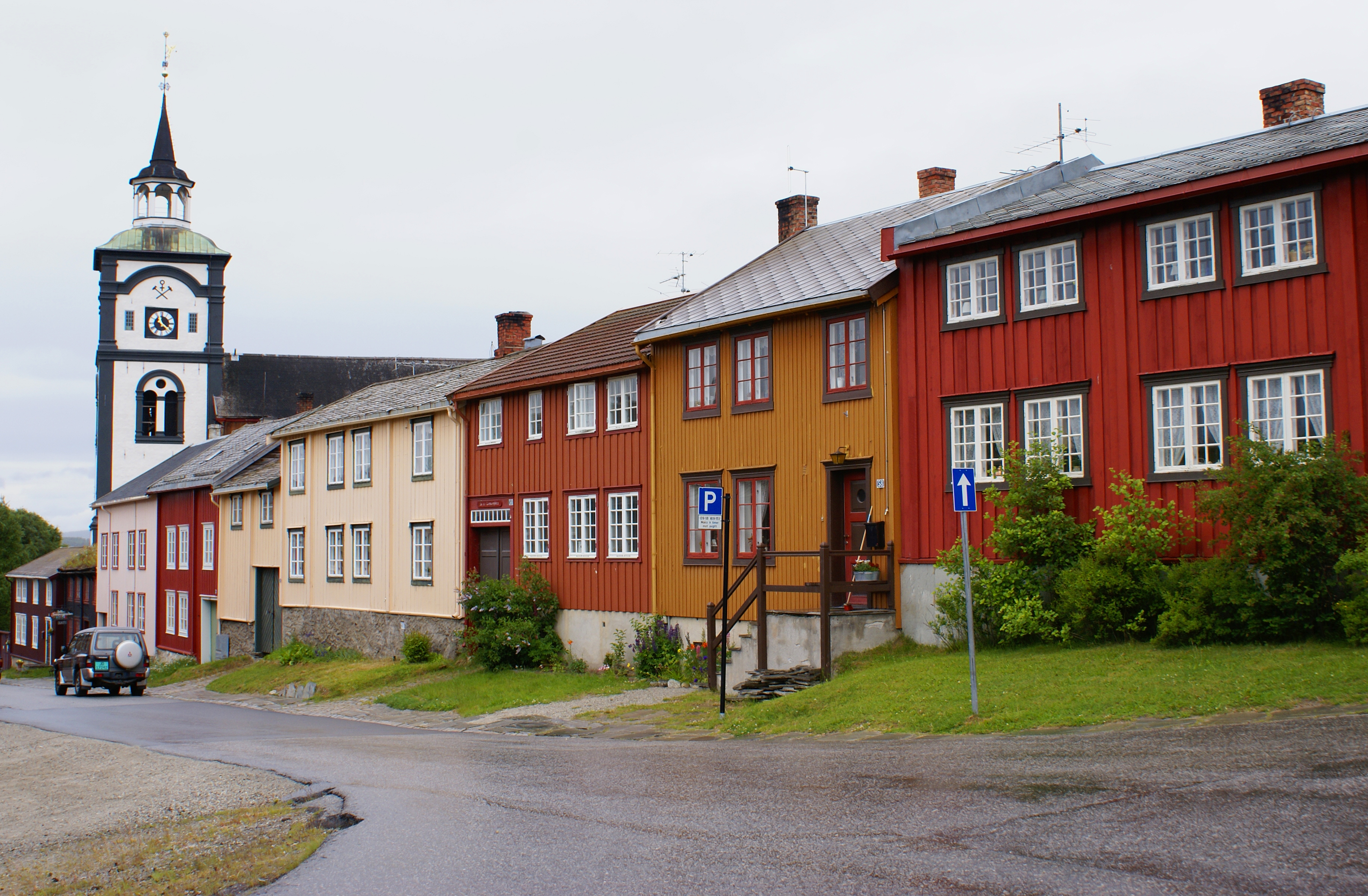
- View of the central part of the town
- Interactive map of: Røros (Norwegian); Plaassja (Southern Sami)
- Coordinates: 62.57427°N 11.38339°E
- Country: Norway
- Region: Central Norway
- County: Trøndelag
- District: Gauldalen
- Municipality: Røros Municipality
- Established as
- Bergstaden: 1646

Area
  - Total: 3.31 km^{2} (1.28 sq mi)
- Elevation: 630 m (2,070 ft)

Population (2025)
  - Total: 5,665
  - Density: 1,181/km^{2} (3,060/sq mi)
- Demonym: Rørosing
- Time zone: UTC+01:00 (CET)
  - Summer (DST): UTC+02:00 (CEST)
- Post Code: 7374 Røros

UNESCO World Heritage Site
- Official name: Røros Mining Town and the Circumference
- Criteria: Cultural: iii, iv, v
- Reference: 55
- Inscription: 1980 (4th Session)
- Extensions: 2010
- Area: 16,510 hectares (64 mi^{2})
- Buffer zone: 481,240 hectares (1,858 mi^{2})

Røros or Plaassja (Southern Sami) is the administrative centre of Røros Municipality in Trøndelag county, Norway. The town is located along the river Hyttelva and along the Rørosbanen railway line, about 10 kilometres (6.2 mi) south of the village of Glåmos and about the same distance north of the village of Os i Østerdalen in neighboring Innlandet county.

The 3.31-square-kilometre (820-acre) town has a population (2024) of 3,909 and a population density of 1,181 inhabitants per square kilometre (3,060/sq mi).

The mining town of Røros is sometimes called Bergstaden, which means "the rock town", due to its historical copper mining. It is one of two towns in Norway that were historically designated as a bergstad or "mining town", along with the "silver-town" of Kongsberg in Buskerud county. The bergstad formerly had special rights as a mining town, slightly different from those of other towns/cities in Norway. Because of this, it is sometimes referred to as a town, despite the actual classification being a bergstad.

Many modern-day inhabitants of Røros still work and live in the characteristic 17th- and 18th-century buildings which have led to its designation as a UNESCO World Heritage Site in 1980. The town of Røros has about 80 historic wooden houses, most of them standing around courtyards. Many retain their dark pitch-log facades, giving the town a medieval appearance. There are also two churches in the town. The large and historic Røros Church and the relatively new, but unique-looking Røros Chapel.

== History ==
The Røros area has been used by the Southern Sami people for reindeer herding throughout history. The area is well known for its copper mines, and Røros is one of Norway's two nationally significant mining towns, known as a bergstad, with activity starting in the 17th century (the other one being the "silver-town" Kongsberg where the Kongsberg Silver Mines were located). In 1646, the town was designated as a bergstad, a classification that is similar to a town, but specifically geared towards mining.

The town of Røros was burned to the ground in 1678 and 1679 by the Swedish Army during the Scanian War. In 1718, during the Great Northern War, the town was once again taken by the Swedish Army, led by General De la Barre, who made up the southern arm of the main Swedish Army under Carl Gustaf Armfeldt. De la Barre took the town and all their mined copper at gunpoint.

When King Carl XII was killed near Fredriksten on 30 November 1718, De la Barre retreated north to join the bulk of the army. However, this ended in tragedy, when over 3,000 rather unprepared soldiers perished in the harsh weather conditions in the mountains northwest of Røros.

Røros and its people were made famous to Norwegians at the turn of the 20th century by semi-fictional author Johan Falkberget, who told the story of the mining community from the perspective of the hard-tested miners at the bottom of the social ladder.

With its authentic wooden buildings, Røros was added to the UNESCO World Heritage Site list in 1980.

=== Røros copper works ===
In 1644, the general manager of the mine at Kongsberg gave permission to exploit one lode of copper in the mountains near Rauhaammaaren. Storvola and Gamle Storwartz became some of the company's most important mines. Nordgruve, another important mining area, was situated to the north east of the town of Røros.

Starting in 1740 and onwards, there was a period of greatness for the Røros Copper Works with several mines yielding well. Dynamite was used from 1870 and later drilling machines. The electrical generating station built high-tension power lines to supply the mines starting in 1897. The Bessemer process was introduced at the end of the 1800s. The Rørosbanen railway line was completed in 1877. High prices for both copper and zinc gave good results, but then the prices dropped and there were several years with large losses. After 333 years, mining activity in Røros ceased in 1977.

== Name ==
The town is named after the old Røros farm (Old Norse: Røyðaróss) since this was the site where the mining town of Røros was built. The first element comes from the local river name Røa (Røyðr) which has an unknown meaning. The last element comes from óss which means "mouth of a river" (the small river Røa runs into the great river Glåma here). There is no available interpretation of the Southern Sami language name, Plassja.

== Culture ==
During winter, a traditional market called "Rørosmartnan" is organized and that draws an average of 60,000–70,000 tourists each year. The market begins on the last Tuesday in February and lasts five days.

There is also an outdoor musical theatre performance played in Røros to commemorate the tragedy when the Swedish soldiers froze to death. This show has been played since 1994.

The town of Røros was the filming location for Henrik Ibsen's play "A Doll's House", directed by Joseph Losey.

== Media gallery ==
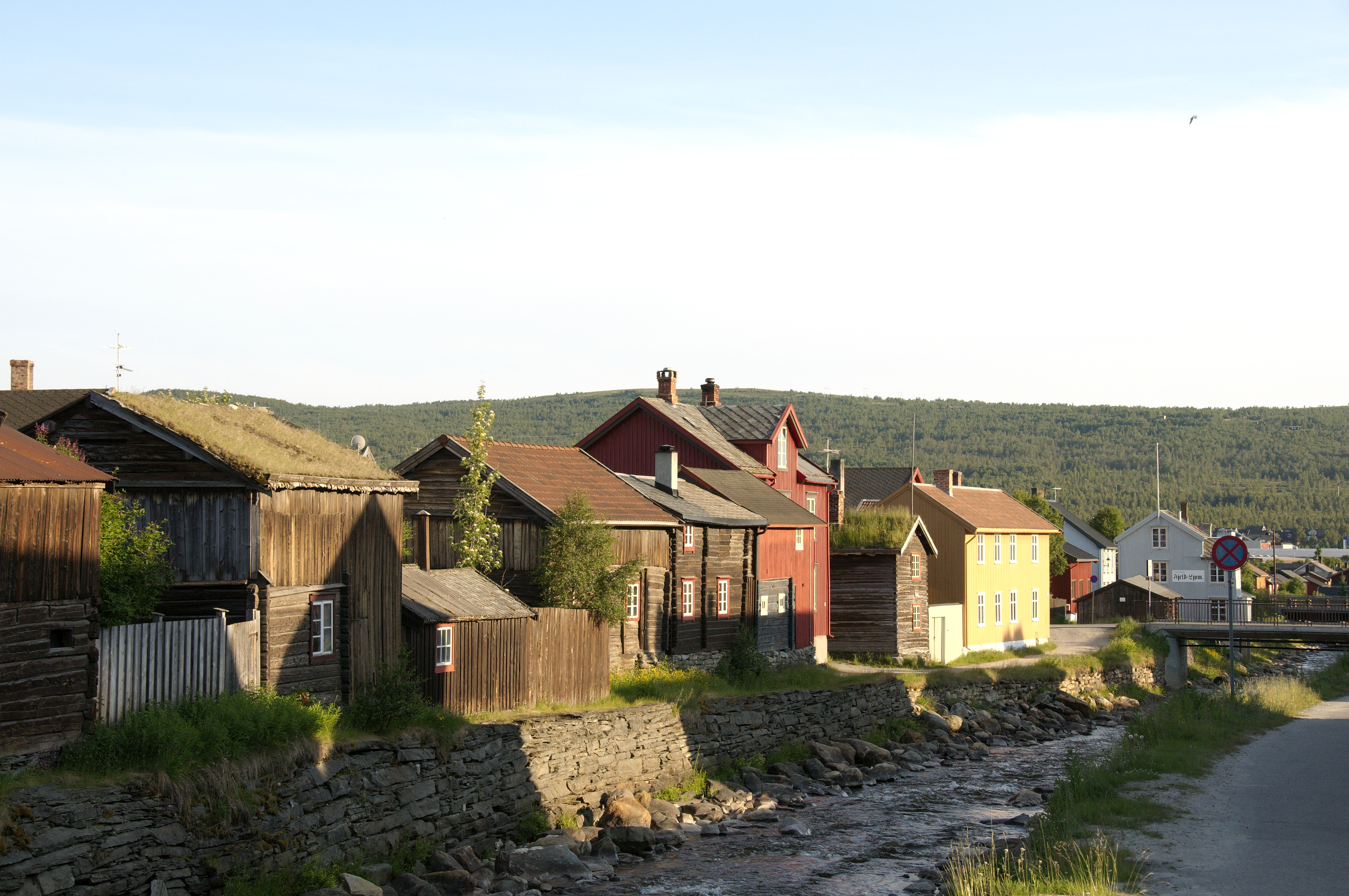

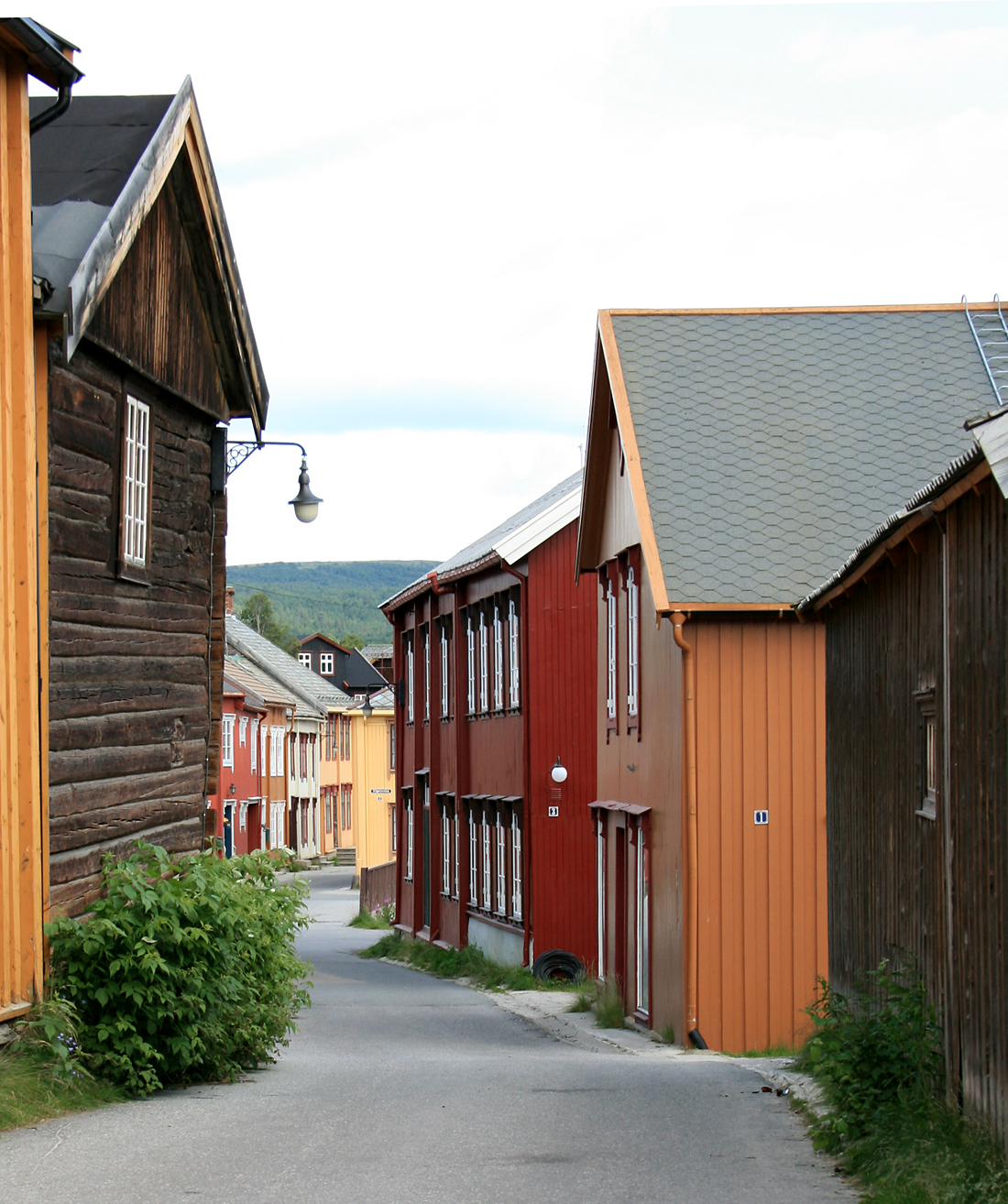

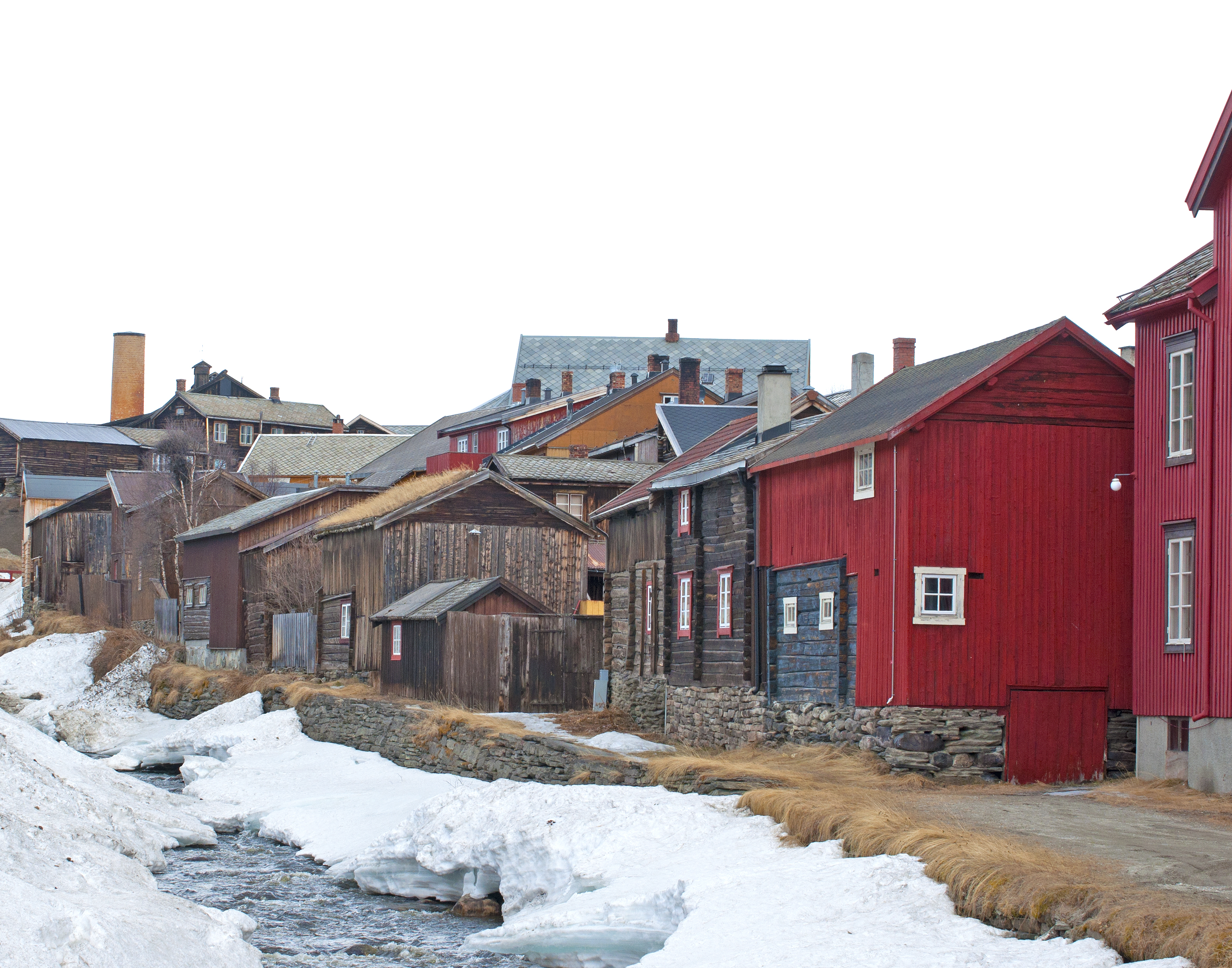

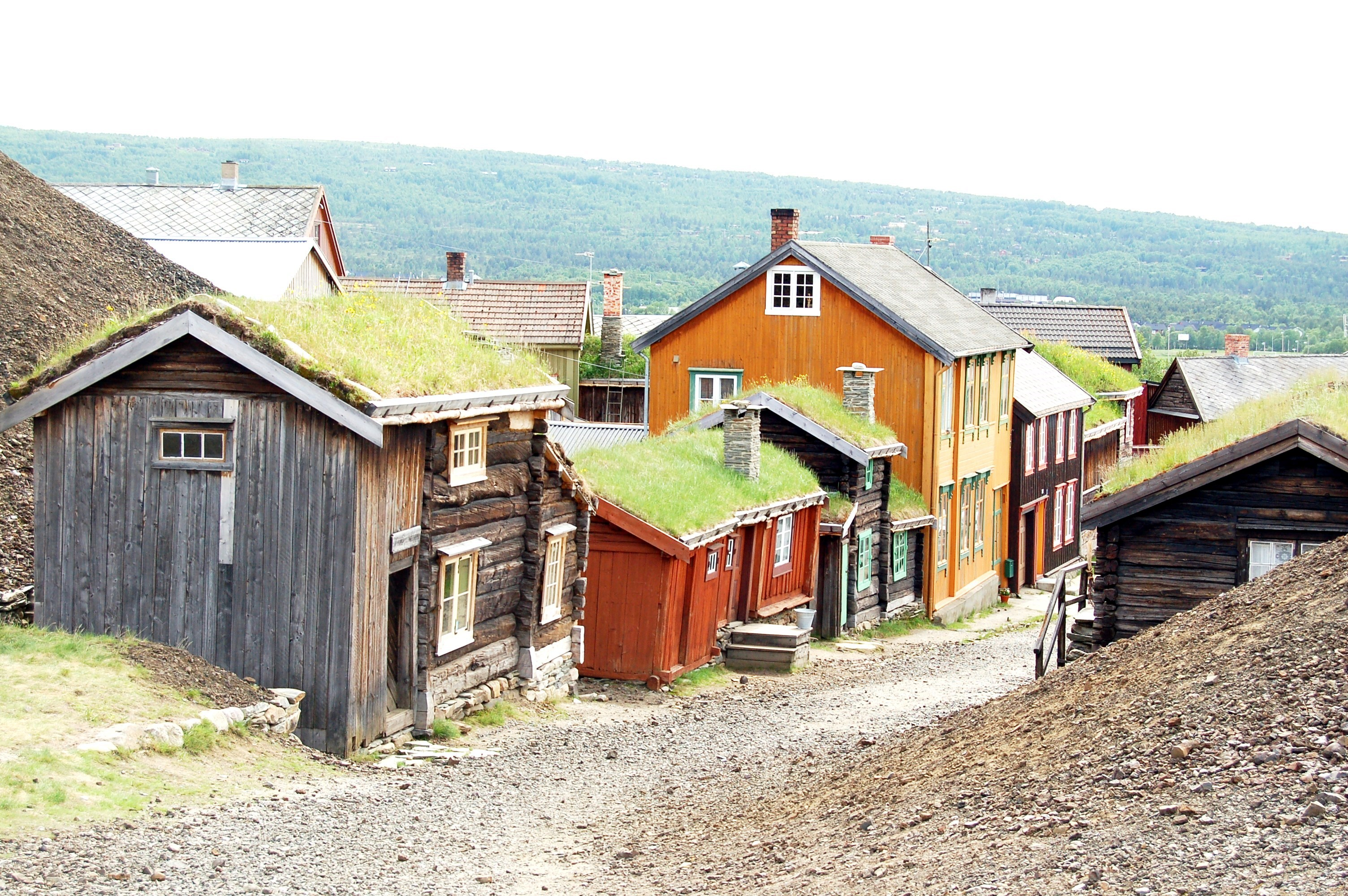

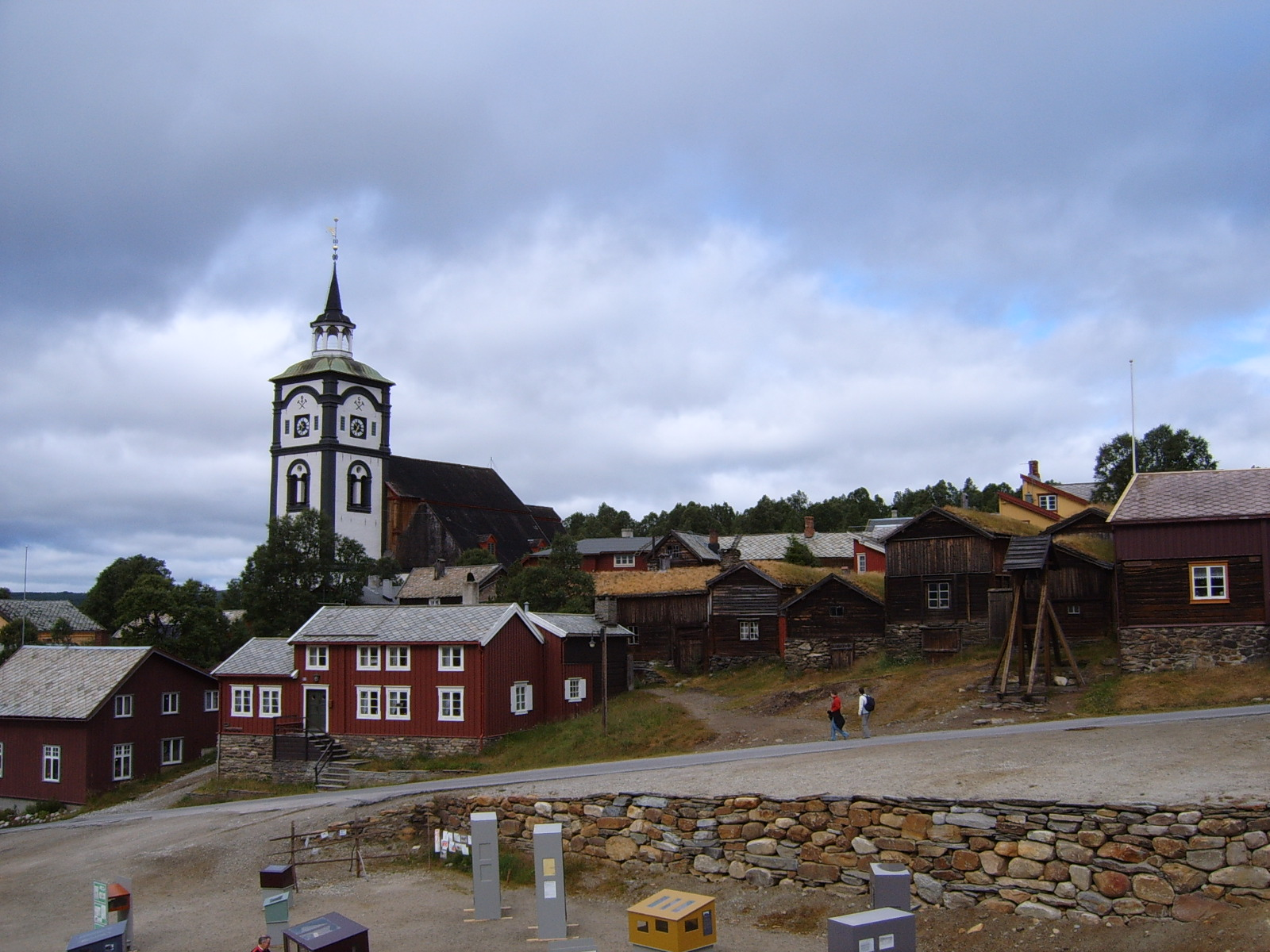

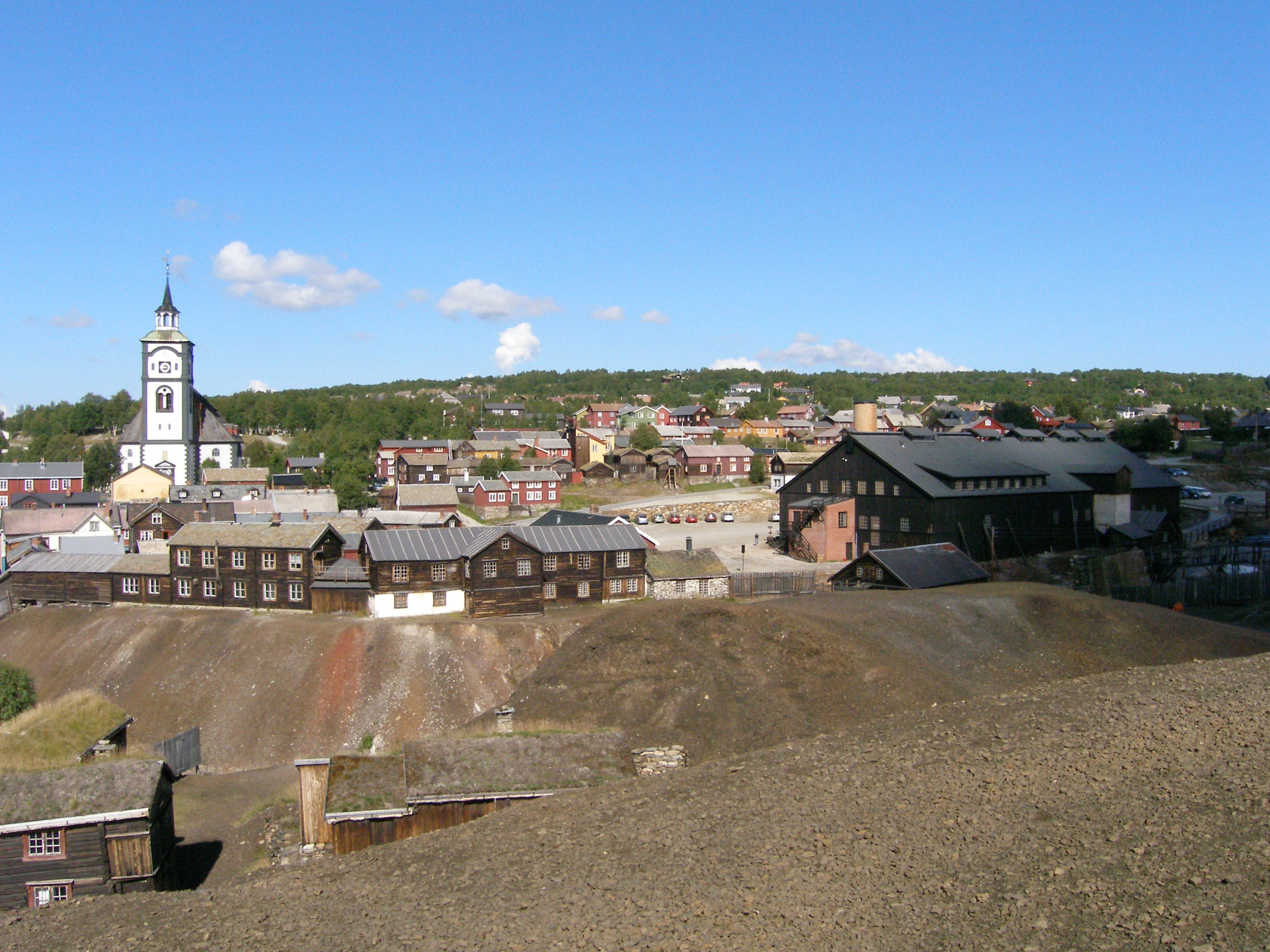

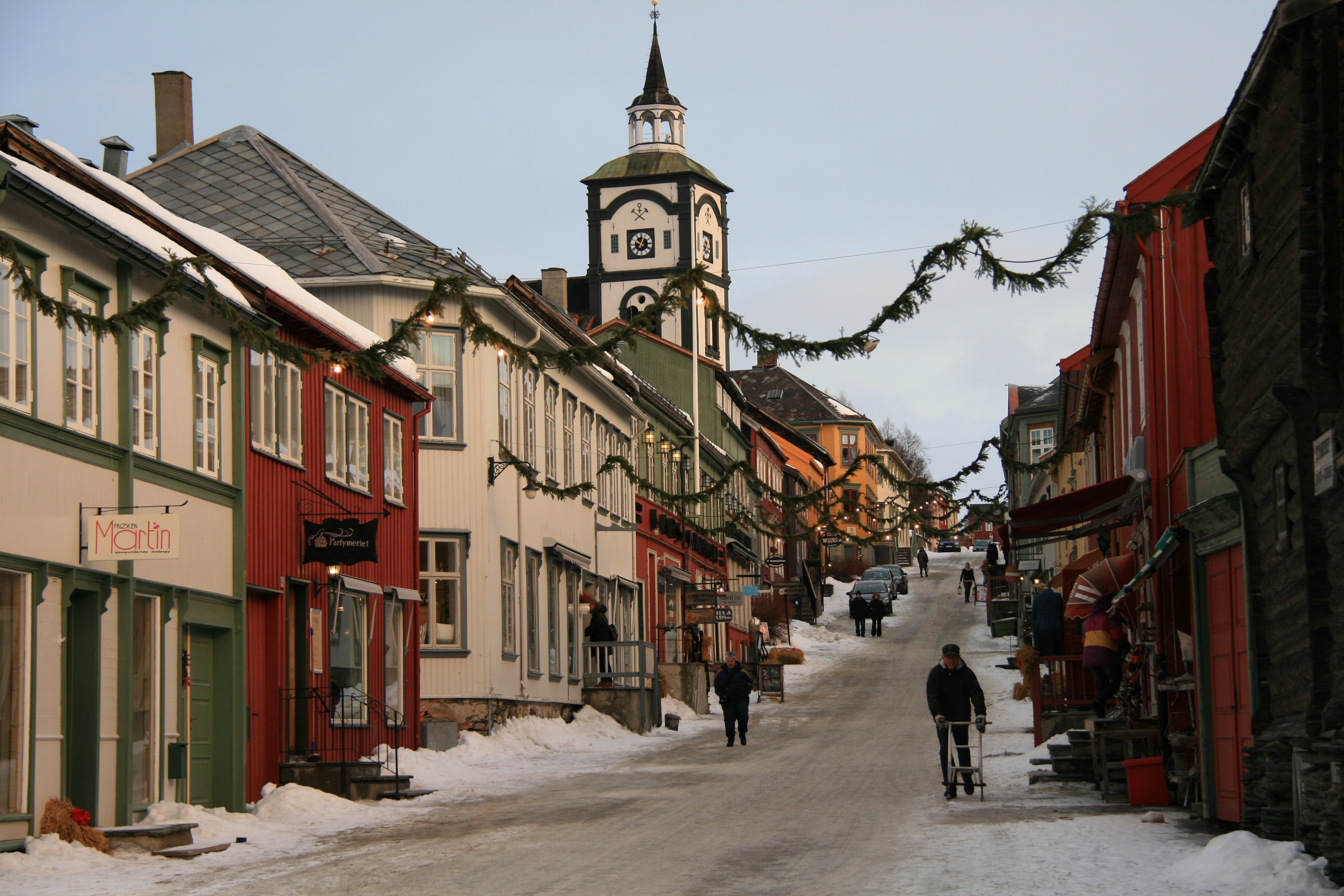

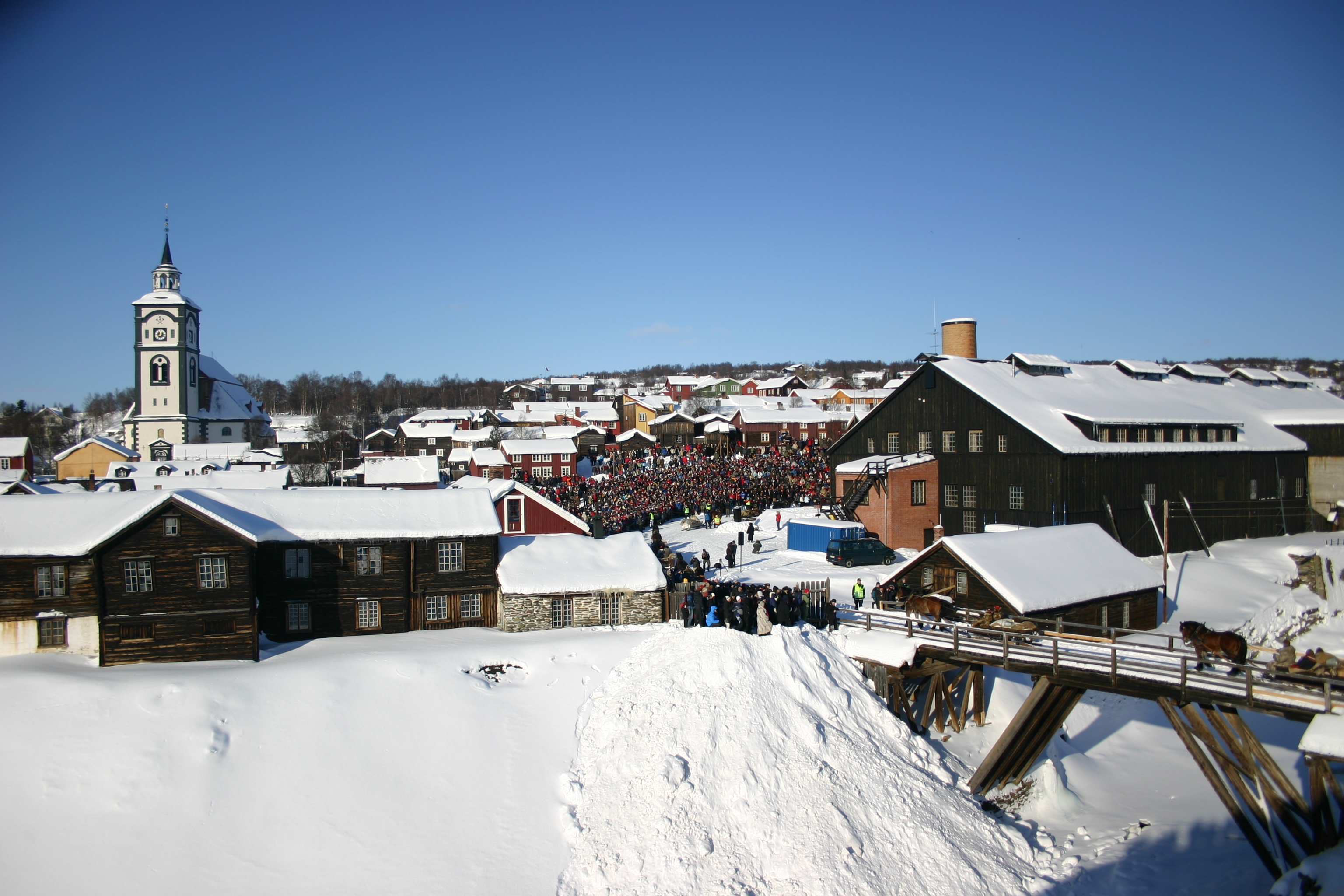

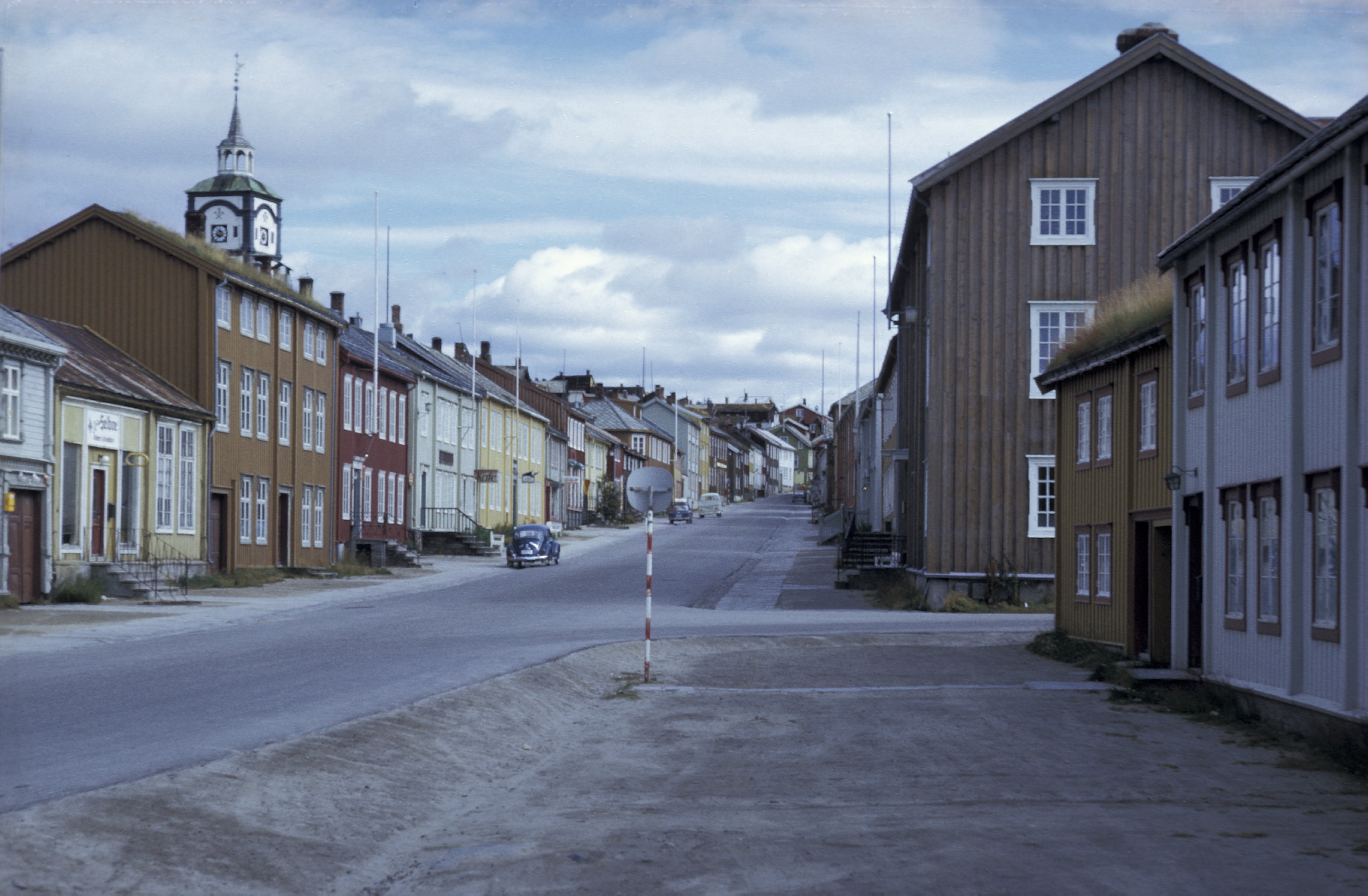

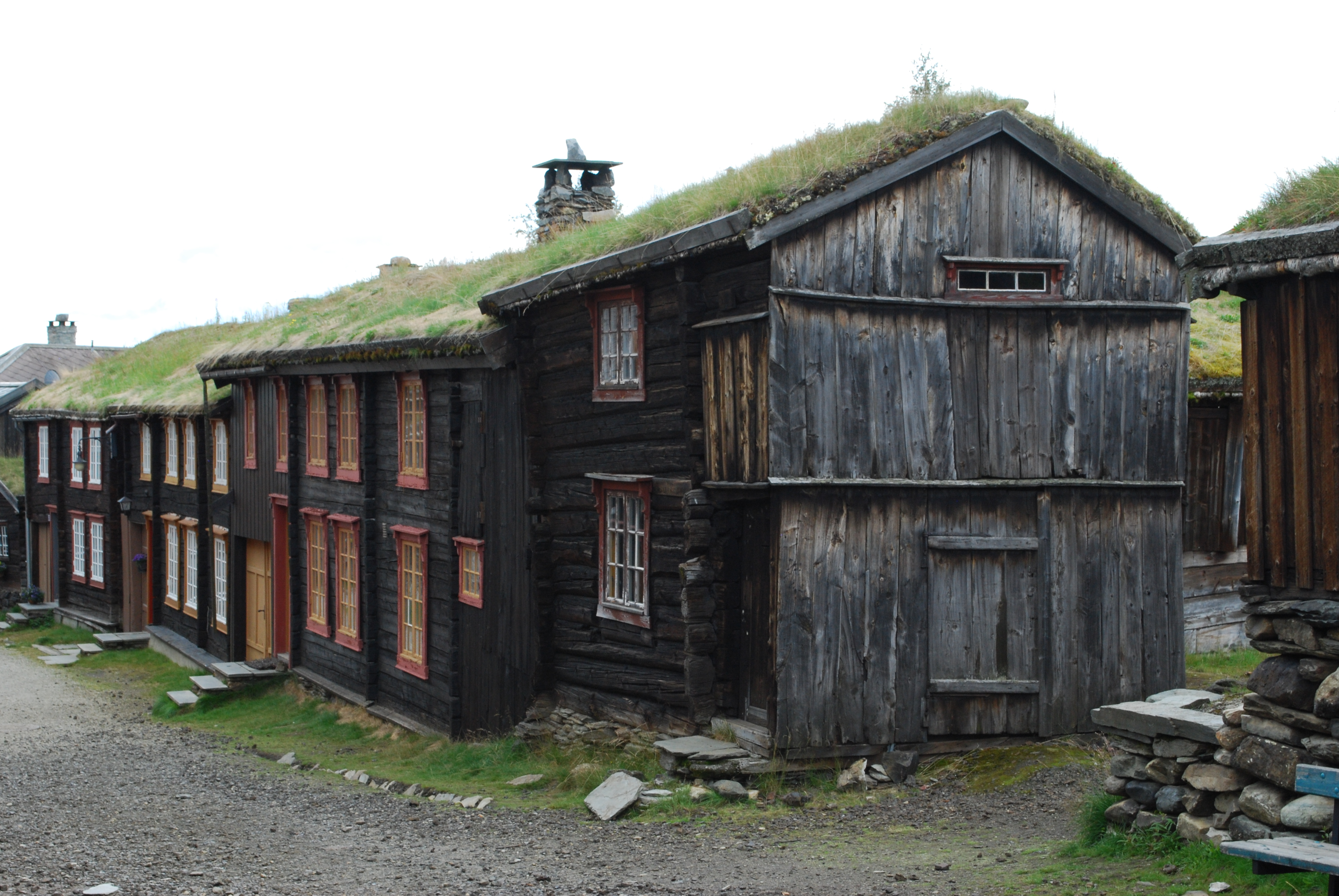

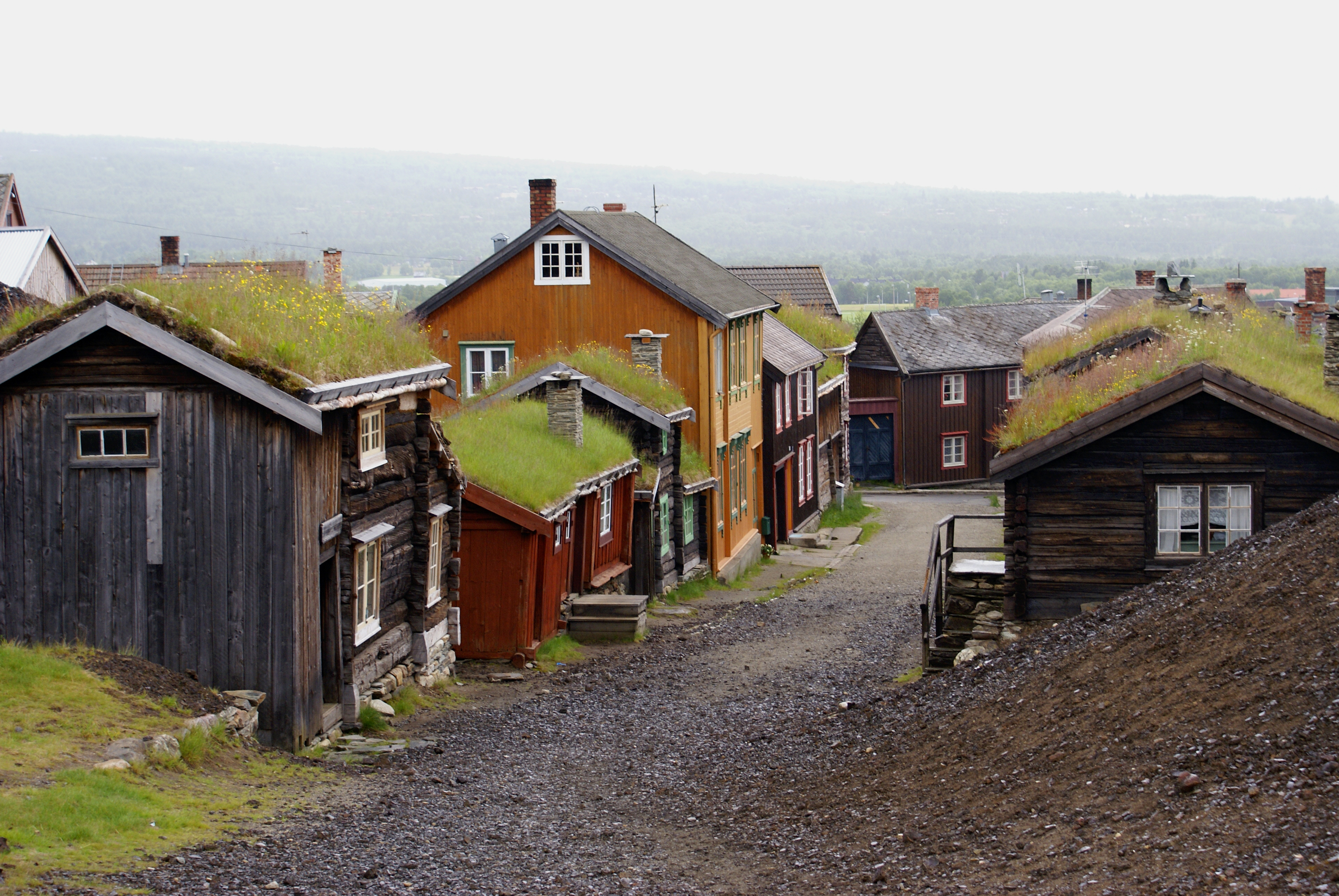

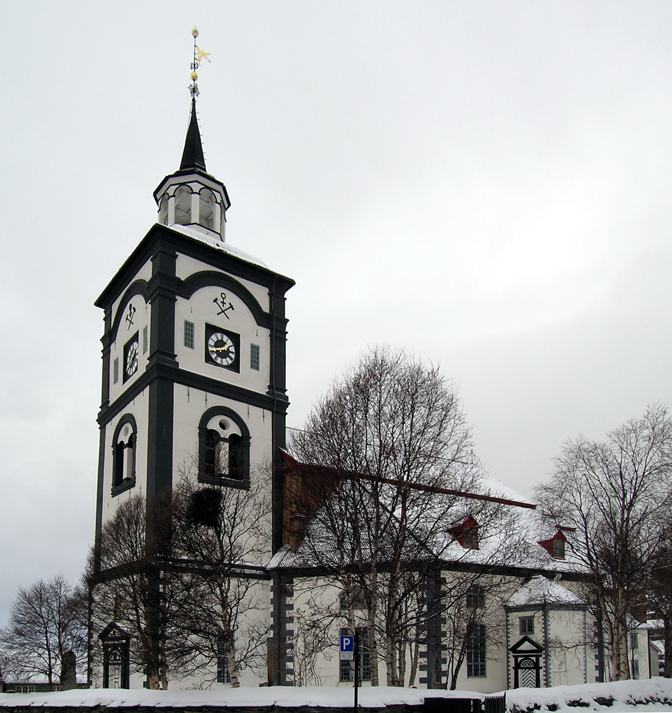

== See also ==
- List of towns and cities in Norway
