= Røros =

Røros may refer to:

== Places ==
- Røros Municipality, a municipality in Trøndelag county, Norway
- Røros (town), a town within Røros Municipality in Trøndelag county, Norway
- Røros Church, a church in Røros Municipality in Trøndelag county, Norway
- Røros Chapel, a chapel in Røros Municipality in Trøndelag county, Norway
- Røros landsogn, a former municipality in the old Sør-Trøndelag county, Norway
- Røros Mining Town and the Circumference, a UNESCO world heritage site in Røros Municipality in Trøndelag county, Norway

== Transportation ==
- Røros Airport, an airport in Røros Municipality in Trøndelag county, Norway
- Røros Station, a railway station in Røros Municipality in Trøndelag county, Norway
- Røros Line, a railway line in Trøndelag county, Norway
- Røros Flyservice, a Norwegian aircraft ground handling company operating at nine airports

== Other ==
- Røros IL, a sports club based in Røros Municipality in Trøndelag county, Norway
- Røros Winter Market, an annual market held in Røros Municipality in Trøndelag county, Norway
- Røros Copper Works, a defunct copper mining company in Røros, Norway
