= Korssjøen =

Lake in Røros, Trøndelag, Norway

- Interactive map of the lake
- Location: Røros Municipality, Trøndelag
- Coordinates: 62.4328°N 11.5411°E
- Basin countries: Norway
- Max. length: 7.5 kilometres (4.7 mi)
- Max. width: 3 kilometres (1.9 mi)
- Surface area: 8.22 km^{2} (3.17 sq mi)
- Shore length^{1}: 759 kilometres (472 mi)
- Surface elevation: 22.31 metres (73.2 ft)
- References: NVE
- ^{1} Shore length is not a well-defined measure.

Korssjøen is a lake in Røros Municipality in Trøndelag county, Norway. The lake is located about 16 kilometres (9.9 mi) southeast of the town of Røros. The lake Rambergsjøen lies about 5 kilometres (3.1 mi) to the north and the lake Flensjøen lies about 10 kilometres (6.2 mi) to the east.

== See also ==
- List of lakes in Norway
