= Galåen =

Galåen may refer to:

- Alternative name of Galåa
- Jens Galaaen
