= Flensjøen =

Lake in Røros, Norway

- Interactive map of the lake
- Location: Innlandet and Trøndelag
- Coordinates: 62.3849°N 11.7681°E
- Basin countries: Norway
- Max. length: 2.5 kilometres (1.6 mi)
- Max. width: 2 kilometres (1.2 mi)
- Surface area: 3.41 km^{2} (1.32 sq mi)
- Shore length^{1}: 12.89 kilometres (8.01 mi)
- Surface elevation: 780 metres (2,560 ft)
- References: NVE
- ^{1} Shore length is not a well-defined measure.

Flensjøen is a lake on the border of Innlandet and Trøndelag counties in Norway. The 3.41-square-kilometre (1.32 sq mi) lake lies in Røros Municipality (in Trøndelag county) and Os Municipality (in Innlandet county). The lake lies about 30 kilometres (19 mi) southeast of the town of Røros, about half-way between the lakes Korssjøen and Femunden, and about 8 kilometres (5.0 mi) south of Håsjøen.

== See also ==
- List of lakes in Norway
