= Stein Erik Gullikstad =

Norwegian Nordic combined skier (born 1952)

Personal information
- Born: 6 February 1952 (age 73); Røros Municipality, Norway

Sport
- Sport: Nordic combined skiing

Stein Erik Gullikstad (born 6 February 1952) is a Norwegian Nordic combined skier. He was born in Røros Municipality, and represented the club Røros IL. He competed at the 1976 Winter Olympics in Innsbruck, where he placed 22nd.
