= Feragen =

Lake in Røros, Norway

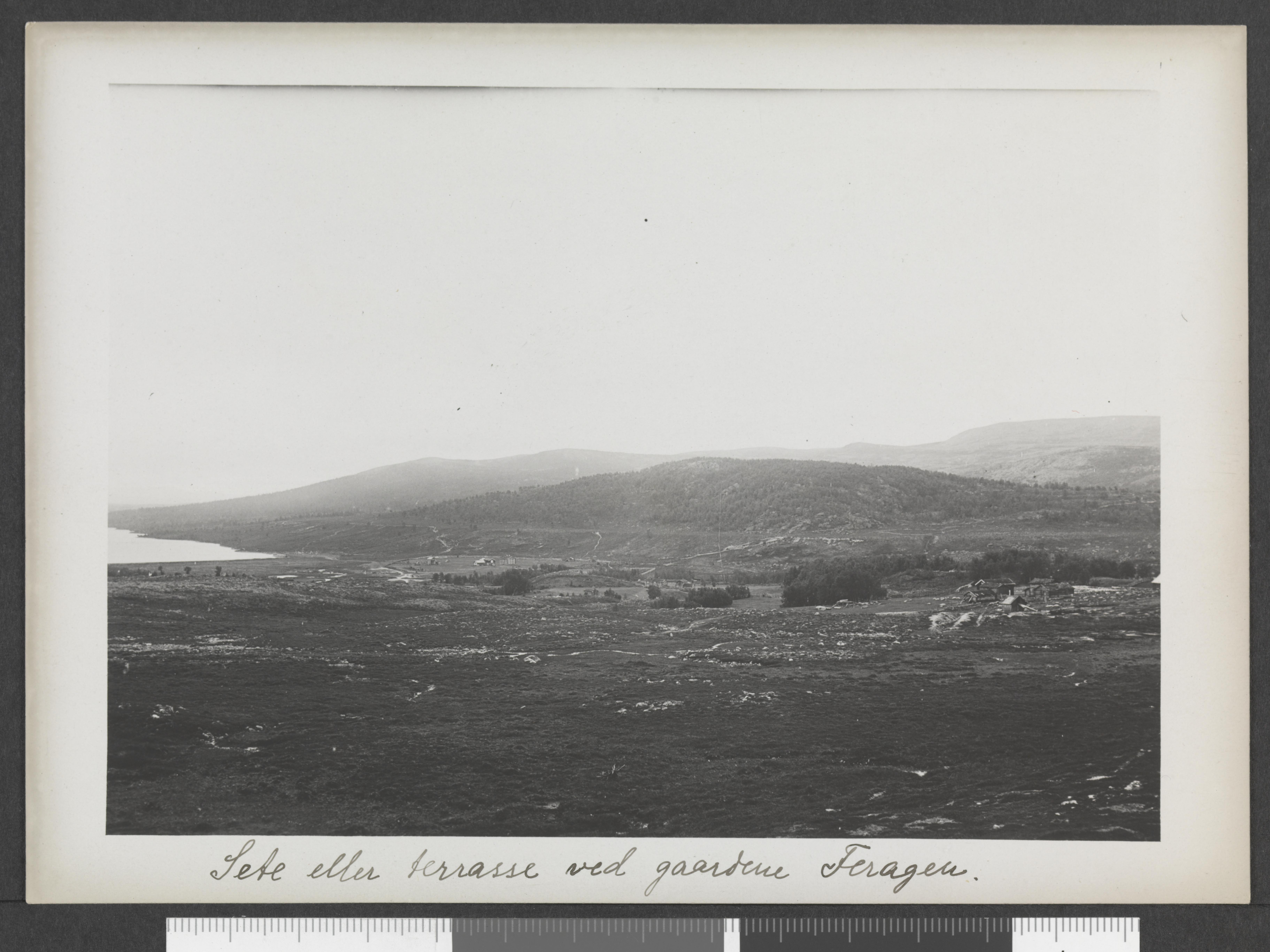
- View of the Feragen farm and lake (c. 1911)
- Interactive map of the lake
- Location: Røros Municipality, Trøndelag
- Coordinates: 62.4907°N 11.8818°E
- Primary outflows: Feragselva river
- Catchment area: Glommadal
- Basin countries: Norway
- Max. length: 10 kilometres (6.2 mi)
- Max. width: 3 kilometres (1.9 mi)
- Surface area: 15.78 km^{2} (6.09 sq mi)
- Shore length^{1}: 37.63 kilometres (23.38 mi)
- Surface elevation: 654 metres (2,146 ft)
- References: NVE
- ^{1} Shore length is not a well-defined measure.

Feragen is a lake in Røros Municipality in Trøndelag county, Norway. The 15.78-square-kilometre (6.09 sq mi) lake is located about 25 kilometres (16 mi) east of the town of Røros. The lake flows out into the lake Håsjøen and the Håelva river. There is a canal connecting the lake Feragen to the nearby lake Femunden.

The village of Feragen is a very small village situated at the northern end of the lake, about 11 kilometres (6.8 mi) south of the village of Brekken.

== See also ==
- List of lakes in Norway
