= Even Erlien =

Norwegian politician (born 1955)

Even Erlien (born 16 January 1955) is a Norwegian politician for the Centre Party.

He served as a deputy representative in the Norwegian Parliament from Sør-Trøndelag during the terms 1993–1997 and 1997–2001.

On the local level, Erlien was mayor of Røros Municipality until 1999.
