= Sør-Trøndelag =

County of Norway (1804–2018)

Sør-Trøndelag County Sør-Trøndelag fylke
- Former County
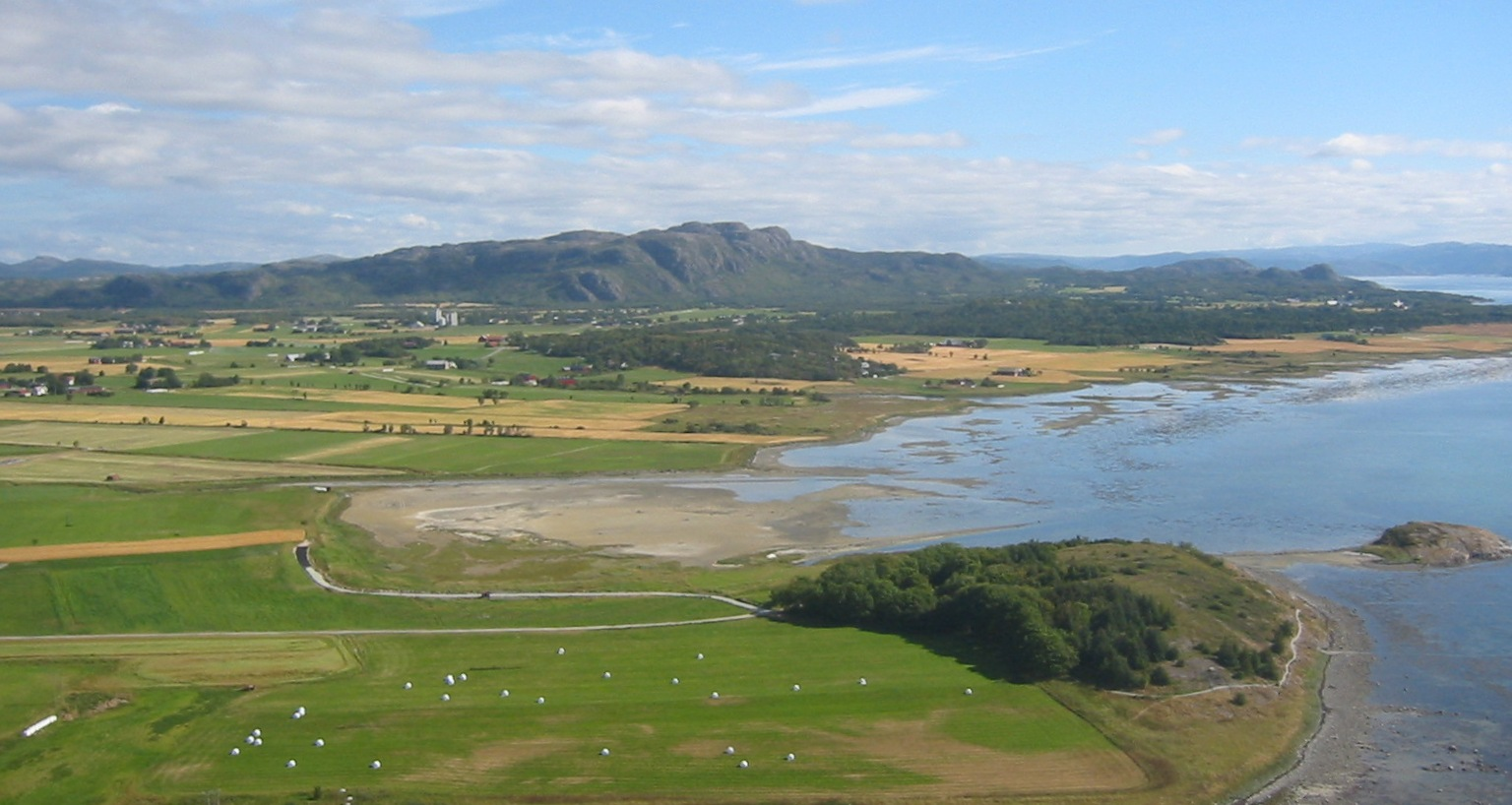
- Isle Bruholmen with parts of Austrått and Rusaset by the mid-2000s

- Flag Coat of arms

- Location within Sør-Trøndelag Location within Norway
- Coordinates: 63°10′N 10°20′E
- Country: Norway
- County: Sør-Trøndelag
- District: Trøndelag
- Established: 1804
  - Preceded by: Trondheims amt
- Disestablished: 1 Jan 2018
  - Succeeded by: Trøndelag county
- Administrative centre: Trondheim

Government
  - Body: Sør-Trøndelag County Municipality
  - Governor (2015-2017): Brit Skjelbred
  - County mayor: Tore O. Sandvik (Ap)

Area (upon dissolution)
  - Total: 18,848 km^{2} (7,277 sq mi)
  - Land: 17,830 km^{2} (6,880 sq mi)
  - Water: 1,018 km^{2} (393 sq mi) 5.4%

Population (2017)
  - Total: 317,363
  - Rank: #5 in Norway
  - Density: 15/km^{2} (39/sq mi)
  - Change (10 years): ▲ +5.8%
- Demonym: Sørtrønder

Official language
  - Norwegian form: Neutral
- Time zone: UTC+01:00 (CET)
  - Summer (DST): UTC+02:00 (CEST)
- ISO 3166 code: NO-16
- Income (per capita): 139,200 kr (2001)
- GDP (per capita): 243,281 kr (2001)
- GDP national rank: #5 in Norway (4.23% of country)

Sør-Trøndelag (Urban East Norwegian: [ˈsø̂ːˌʈrœndəlɑːɡ]; lit. 'South Trøndelag') was a county comprising the southern portion of the present-day Trøndelag county in Norway. It bordered the old Nord-Trøndelag (lit. 'North Trøndelag') county as well as the counties of Møre og Romsdal, Oppland, and Hedmark. To the west is the Norwegian Sea (Atlantic Ocean), and to the east is Jämtland in Sweden. The county was separated into a northern and southern part by the Trondheimsfjorden. Slightly over 200,000 of the county's population (or around 55%) lives in the city of Trondheim and its suburbs. The Norwegian dialect of the region is Trøndersk.

The region was divided into two administrative counties in 1804. In 2016, the two county councils voted to merge into a single county, which became effective 1 January 2018.

== Name ==
Historical population
Year	Pop.	±%
1951	197,687	—
1961	211,819	+7.1%
1971	234,022	+10.5%
1981	244,760	+4.6%
1991	251,076	+2.6%
2001	264,865	+5.5%
2011	294,066	+11.0%
Source: SSB.no, Statistics Norway.

The name Sør-Trøndelag was created in 1919. It means '(the) southern (part of) Trøndelag'.

Until 1919, the name of the county was Søndre Trondhjems amt. The meaning of this name was '(the) southern (part of) Trondhjems amt'. (The old Trondhjems amt, created in 1662, was divided in 1804. Trondhjem is the old form of Trondheim.)

See also Nord-Trøndelag

== Coat of arms ==
The coat of arms was from modern times (1983) - but it had old roots: it was the seal of Gaute Ivarsson, archbishop of Trondheim 1475–1510.

== Geography ==
Sør-Trøndelag consisted of 25 municipalities and had a total area of 18,848 square kilometres (7,277 sq mi). Trondheim is the largest city and the county's administrative center.

The broad and long Trondheimsfjord is at the center of this county, although the coastal areas stretch somewhat further north. The mountain ranges Dovrefjell and Trollheimen are located in the south, while the Fosen peninsula is located north of the fjord. The highest mountain is the 1,985-metre (6,512 ft) tall Storskrymten, which is located in the county border between Møre og Romsdal, Oppland, and Trøndelag. Its longest river is Orkla which runs through Trøndelag and the old county of Hedmark which is now part of Innlandet county.

Several of the best salmon rivers in Europe are located in the county, the largest and most famous being Gaula and Orkla. Dovrefjell–Sunndalsfjella National Park, Forollhogna National Park, Skarvan and Roltdalen National Park and Femundsmarka National Park are located, or partly located, in the county.

== History ==
People have lived in this region for thousands of years (see Rock carvings in Central Norway, Nøstvet and Lihult cultures and Corded Ware culture). The fertile lowland bordering the Trondheimsfjord was probably the most important power centre in the Viking Age. Oretinget was an assembly hall located alongside the Nid River in Trondheim that served as the coronation place for Viking kings such as Harald Fairhair (865 to 933 AD) and his son Haakon I the Good. Nidaros (the former name of Trondheim) served as Norway's capital during the Viking era up until the early part of the 13th century.

Trondheim was the seat of the archbishop for several centuries, and an important pilgrimage destination following the death of St Olav in 1030.

Røros, in the southeastern part of the county, is a well-preserved mining town on a mountain plateau, and is a UNESCO World Heritage Site.

== Economy ==
Mining in Røros and Løkken in Meldal lasted for about 300 years, and Thamshavnbanen, the old electric railway from Orkdalen to Løkken, is still usable. The constant fires used to crack the rock in the mines demanded vast amounts of firewood; the montane forests on the mountain plateau near Røros still have not fully recovered. Along the coast, fishing has always been important. Farming was and still is important in the whole county, with the most economical important agriculture taking place in the fertile lowland valleys, such as in Melhus, Orkdal, Skaun, Midtre Gauldal, Malvik and Trondheim, but also near the outer seaboard, such as in Ørland and Rissa. The city of Trondheim has always been at the centre of this area, with administrative functions, as well as industry based on agricultural produce, and more recently education, high-tech business and healthcare.

== Transportation ==
Sør-Trøndelag is connected to the other counties by the European Route 6 (E6) which passes by Trondheim and connects Oslo in the south and runs north along the coast and terminates just east of Kirkenes in Finnmark. European route E39 connects Sør-Trøndelag to Møre og Romsdal.

There are two airports in Sør-Trøndelag: Røros Airport and Ørland Airport. Trondheim's airport, Værnes, was actually located in Stjørdal Municipality in neighboring Nord-Trøndelag county.

There are local trains that connect several municipalities; there are also trains that connect Trondheim to Oslo, Bodø, Røros, and Steinkjer in Norway, as well as Storlien in Sweden.

Hurtigruten's coastal liner has daily, early- to mid-morning stops in Trondheim on both north- and south-bound trips. There are also frequent commuter boats that connect smaller communities including some that connect Trondheim to Vanviken as well as other ports of call including: Brekstad; Kjørsvikbugen; Volden, Hitra; and Kristiansund.

Additionally, during the summer months larger cruise ships stop in Trondheim.

== Climate ==
The weather is very much decided by the direction of the wind; southerlies and easterlies bring sunny weather, while westerlies bring precipitation with mild weather in winter and cool rainy weather in summer. Northwesterlies bring the worst weather with snow in winter (often sleet or rain on the coast). Average yearly precipitation varies from 2,000 millimetres (79 in) in some areas of Fosen, to 850 millimetres (33 in) in Trondheim and only 500 millimetres (20 in) in Oppdal Municipality.

The interior areas at somewhat higher elevations have cold winters with reliable snow cover, while the coastal areas have a maritime climate with mild and more windy winters. Sula in Frøya Municipality has an average of 1.5 °C (34.7 °F) in the coldest month. Røros, at an altitude of 628 metres (2,060 ft), has a January average of −11.2 °C (11.8 °F) Summer temperatures do not differ that much; sheltered lowlands a bit inland will have the warmest summers. Base period 1961-1990.

== Gallery ==
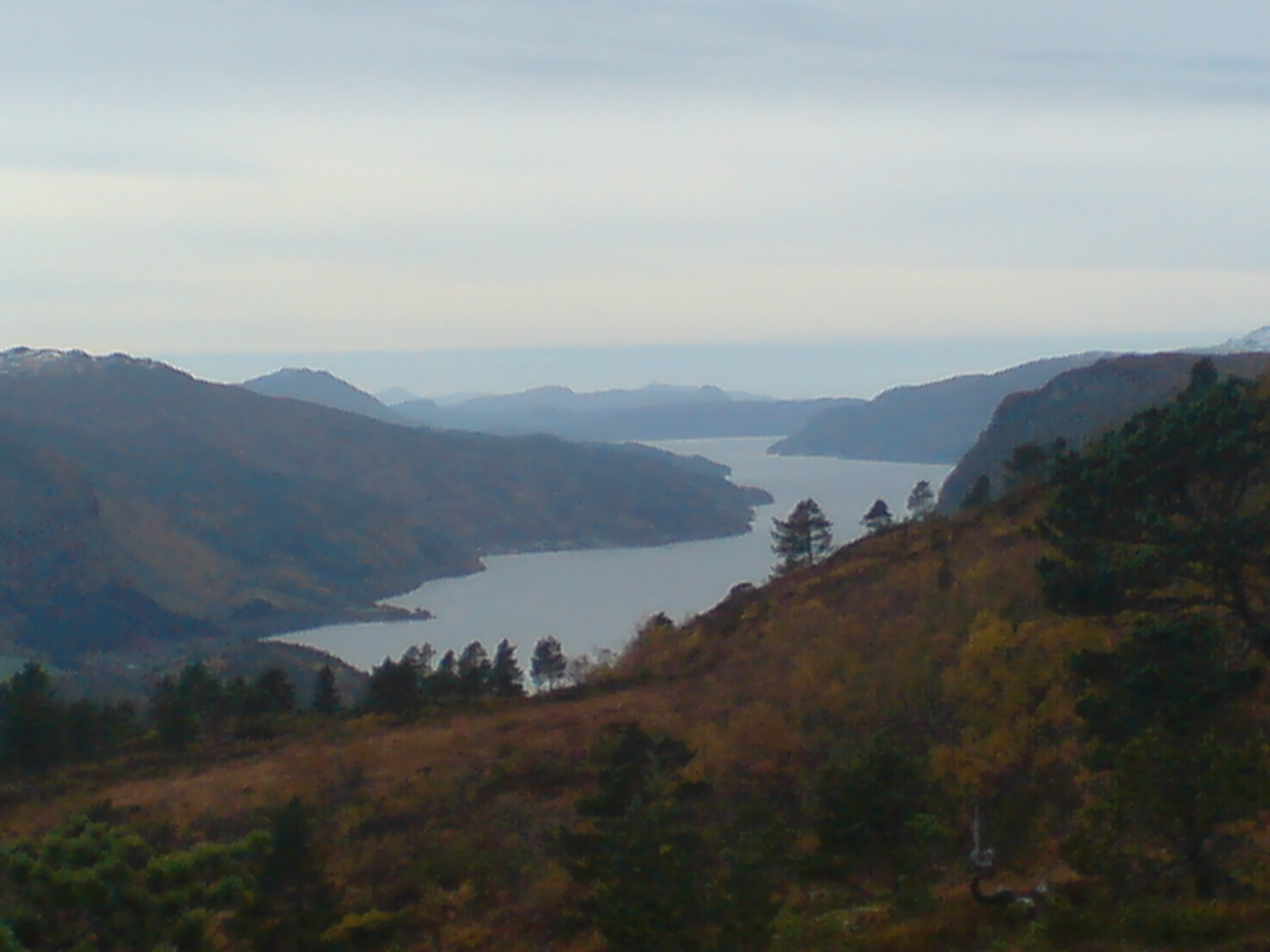
Vinjefjorden in Hemne Municipality.

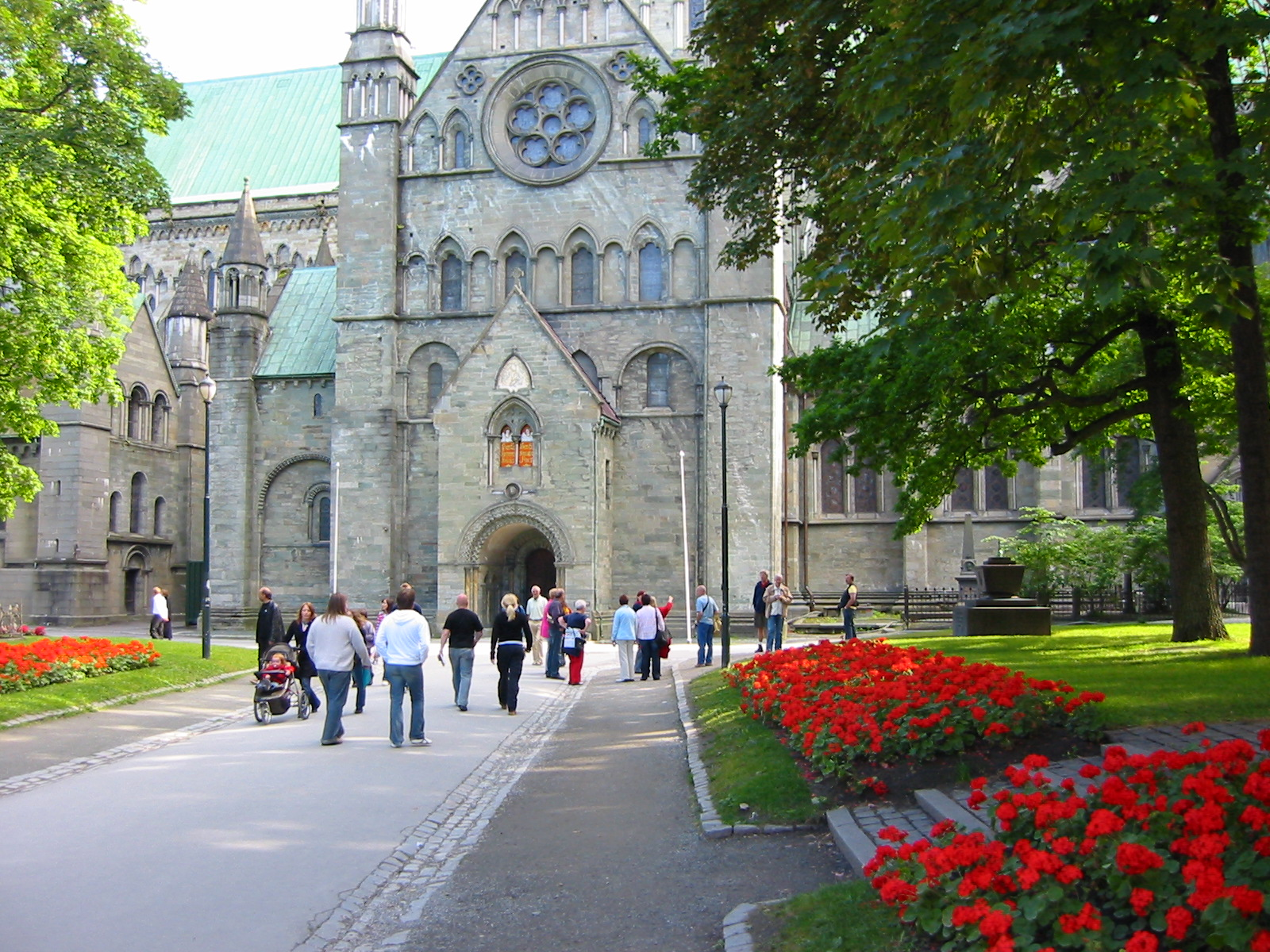
Nidaros Cathedral, Trondheim

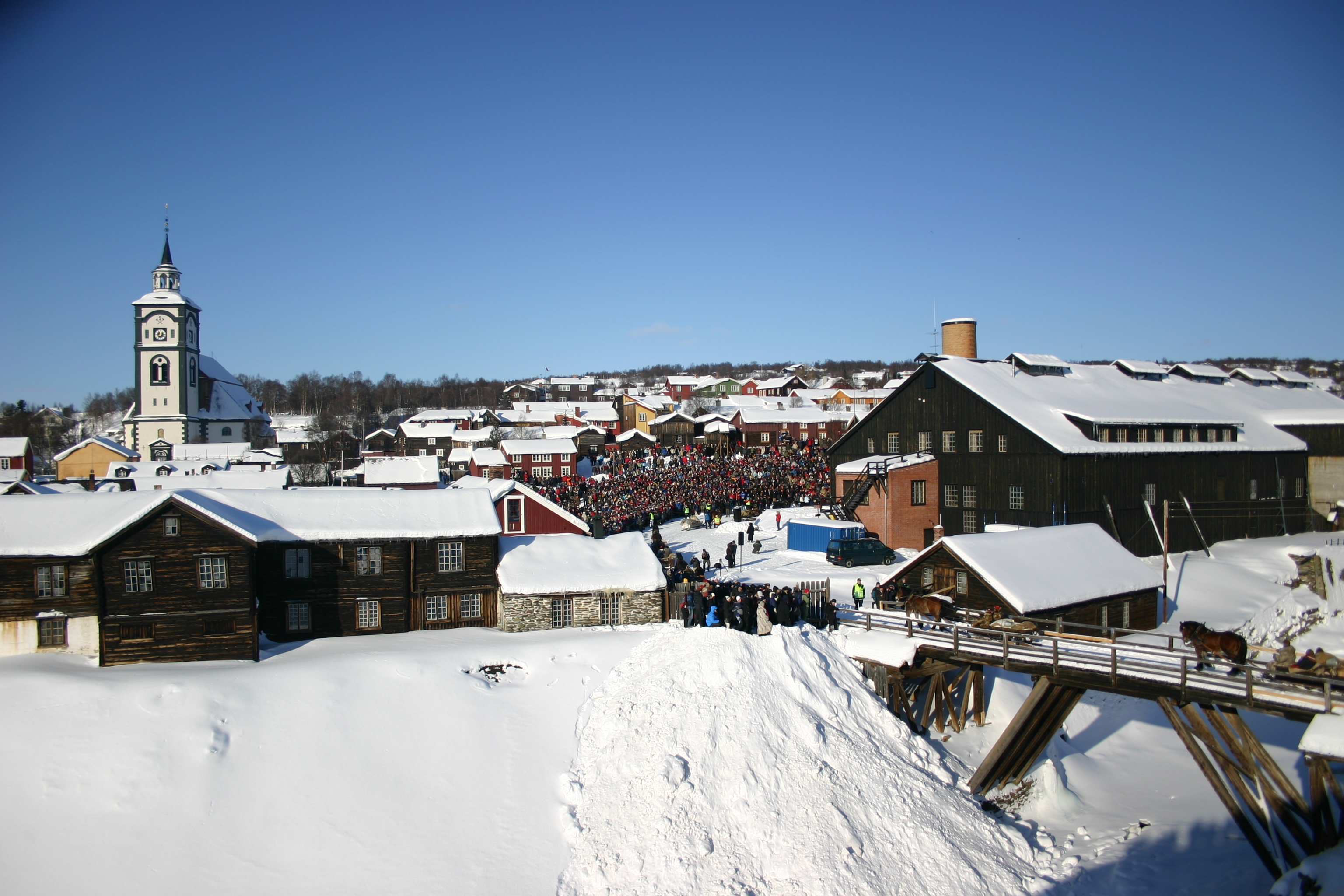
Rørosmartnan - Røros winter market; February 2007

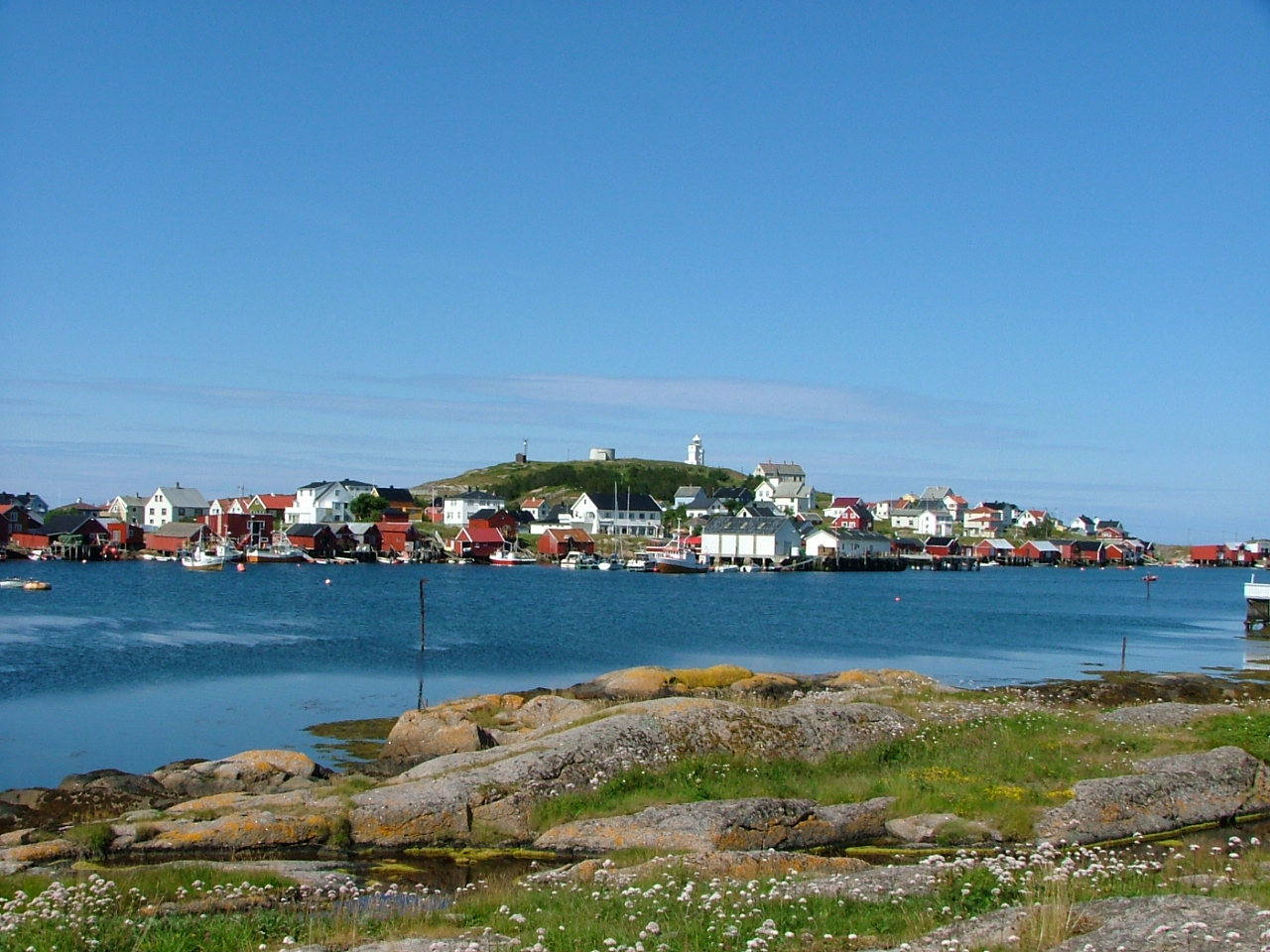
Sula island in Frøya municipality

== Municipalities ==
Religion in Sør-Trøndelag
religion	percent
Christianity	86.79%
Islam	0.92%
Buddhism	0.30%
Other	11.99%

Rank	Name	Inhabitants	Area km^{2}
1	Trondheim	176,008	324
2	Melhus	14,841	660
3	Malvik	12,550	162
4	Orkdal	11,276	567
5	Skaun	6,626	213
6	Oppdal	6,603	2,207
7	Rissa	6,442	590
8	Midtre Gauldal	6,012	1,817
9	Klæbu	5,801	177
10	Røros	5,576	1,764
11	Ørland	5,121	73
12	Bjugn	4,548	356
13	Frøya	4,314	230
14	Hitra	4,256	646
15	Hemne	4,207	638
16	Selbu	4,004	1,147
17	Meldal	3,929	597
18	Åfjord	3,220	900
19	Rennebu	2,622	929
20	Holtålen	2,064	1,177
21	Agdenes	1,719	297
22	Osen	1,033	371
23	Roan	999	357
24	Snillfjord	998	490
25	Tydal	859	1,221
Total	Sør-Trøndelag	290,547	18,848
