= Hitterdalen =

Village in Røros Municipality, Norway

- Village
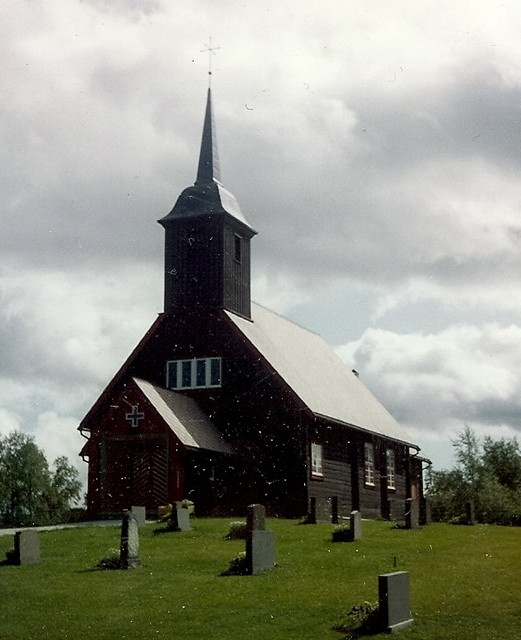
- View of the chapel in the village
- Interactive map of Hitterdalen
- Location within Trøndelag Location within Norway
- Coordinates: 62.6100°N 11.6369°E
- Country: Norway
- Region: Central Norway
- County: Trøndelag
- District: Gauldalen
- Municipality: Røros Municipality
- Elevation: 726 m (2,382 ft)
- Time zone: UTC+01:00 (CET)
  - Summer (DST): UTC+02:00 (CEST)
- Post Code: 7374 Røros

Hitterdalen is a village in Røros Municipality in Trøndelag county, Norway. The village is located on the road between the town of Røros and the village of Brekken, about halfway between the two places. It sits about 3 kilometres (1.9 mi) south of the lake Aursunden. Hitterdal Chapel is located in the village.
