= Hitterdal Chapel =

Church in Trøndelag, Norway

Hitterdal Church
- Hitterdal kirke
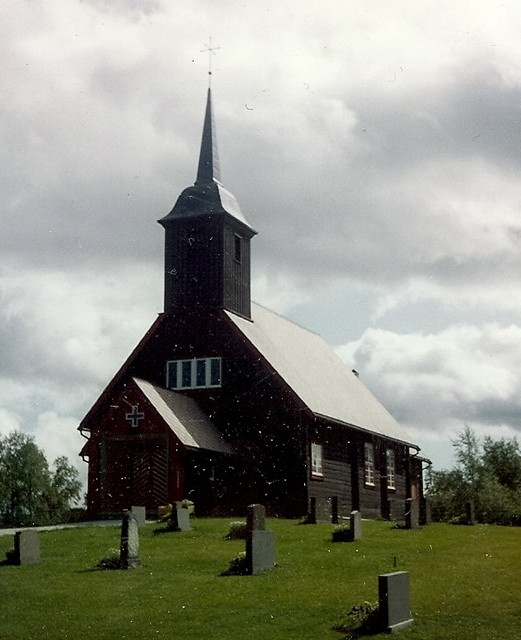
- View of the church
- Hitterdal Church
- 62.609161963°N 11.631400197°E
- Location: Røros Municipality, Trøndelag
- Country: Norway
- Denomination: Church of Norway
- Churchmanship: Evangelical Lutheran

History
- Status: Parish church
- Founded: 1959
- Consecrated: 1959

Architecture
- Functional status: Active
- Architect: John Egil Tverdahl
- Architectural type: Long church
- Completed: 1959 (67 years ago)

Specifications
- Capacity: 130
- Materials: Wood

Administration
- Diocese: Nidaros bispedømme
- Deanery: Gauldal prosti
- Parish: Hitterdalen
- Norwegian Cultural Heritage Site
- Type: Church
- Status: Not protected
- ID: 84580

Hitterdal Chapel (Norwegian: Hitterdal kapell) is a parish church of the Church of Norway in Røros Municipality in Trøndelag county, Norway. It is located in the village of Hitterdalen, about 15 kilometres (9.3 mi) northeast of the town of Røros. It is the church for the Hitterdalen parish which is part of the Gauldal prosti (deanery) in the Diocese of Nidaros. The brown, wooden church was built in a long church style in 1959 using plans drawn up by the architect John Egil Tverdahl. The church seats about 130 people. The church was consecrated in 1959.

== See also ==
- List of churches in Nidaros
