= Rambergssjøen =

Lake in Røros, Norway

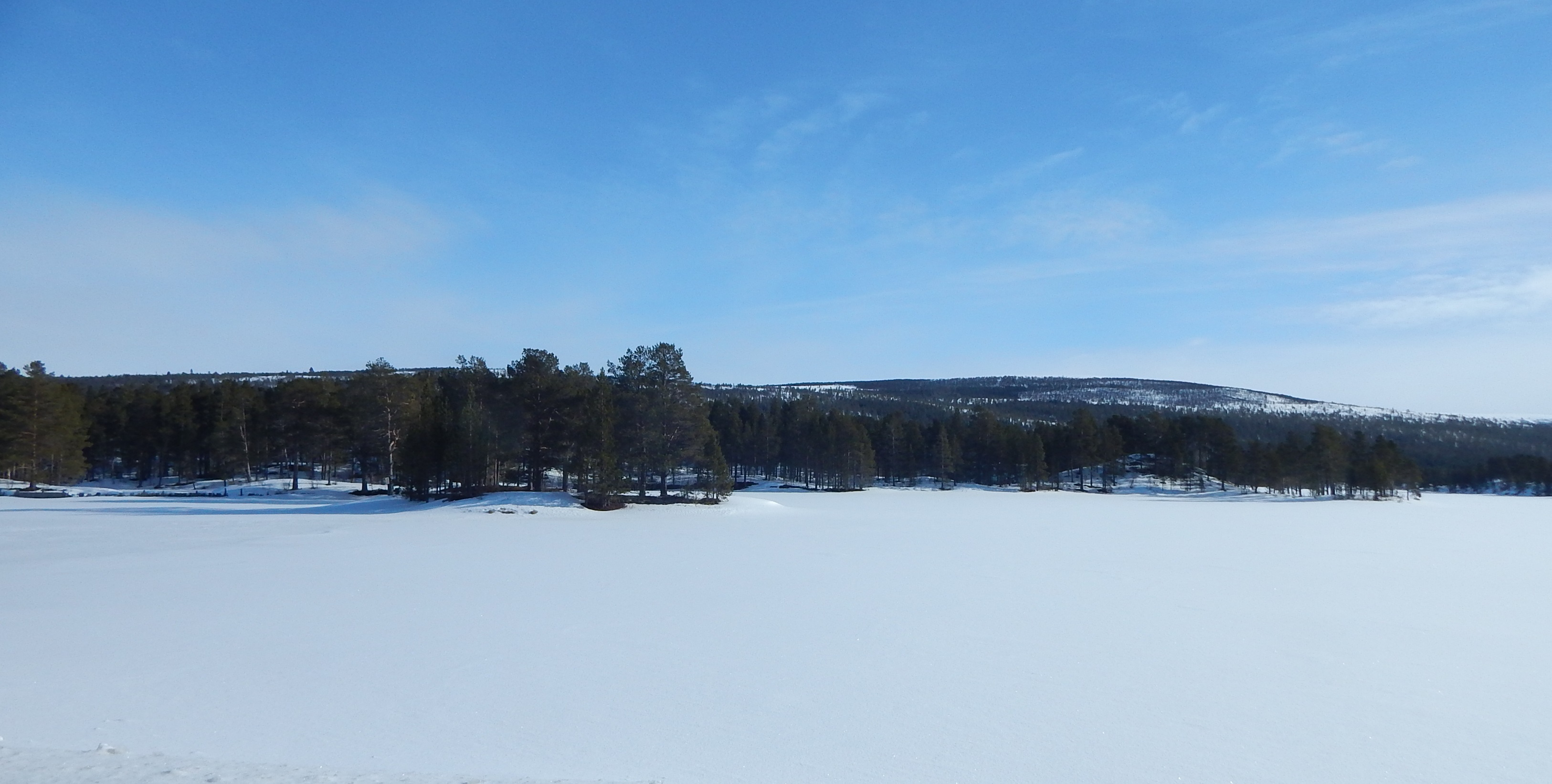
- Interactive map of the lake
- Location: Røros Municipality, Trøndelag
- Coordinates: 62.4964°N 11.5880°E
- Primary inflows: Håsjøen
- Primary outflows: Håelva river
- Catchment area: Glommadal
- Basin countries: Norway
- Max. length: 5.5 kilometres (3.4 mi)
- Max. width: 1 kilometre (0.62 mi)
- Surface area: 3.1 km^{2} (1.2 sq mi)
- Shore length^{1}: 18.58 kilometres (11.55 mi)
- Surface elevation: 646 metres (2,119 ft)
- References: NVE
- ^{1} Shore length is not a well-defined measure.

Rambergssjøen is a lake in Røros Municipality in Trøndelag county, Norway. The lake is located along the river Håelva, just downstream from the lake Håsjøen. The 3.1-square-kilometre (1.2 sq mi) lake is located about 12 kilometres (7.5 mi) southeast of the town of Røros.

== See also ==
- List of lakes in Norway
