= Røros Chapel =

Church in Trøndelag, Norway

- Røros kapell
- Røros gravkapell
- Røros Chapel
- 62.579107090°N 11.386783272°E
- Location: Røros Municipality, Trøndelag
- Country: Norway
- Denomination: Church of Norway
- Churchmanship: Evangelical Lutheran

History
- Status: Chapel
- Founded: 1962
- Consecrated: 1962

Architecture
- Functional status: Active
- Architect: Erik Guldahl
- Architectural type: Circular
- Completed: 1962 (64 years ago)

Specifications
- Capacity: 220
- Materials: Stone

Administration
- Diocese: Nidaros bispedømme
- Deanery: Gauldal prosti
- Parish: Røros

Røros Chapel (Norwegian: Røros kapell) is a chapel in Røros Municipality in Trøndelag county, Norway. It is located in the town of Røros at the north end of the Røros churchyard (and the large Røros Church sits at the south end). It is a chapel in the Røros parish which is part of the Gauldal prosti (deanery) in the Diocese of Nidaros. The stone chapel was built in a circular style inspired by the Goahti of the Sami people in 1962 using plans drawn up by the architect Erik Guldahl. The church seats about 220 people. It is called a gravkapell in Norwegian which translates to "grave chapel" meaning that it is primarily used for funerals and burials in the nearby cemetery.

== Media gallery ==
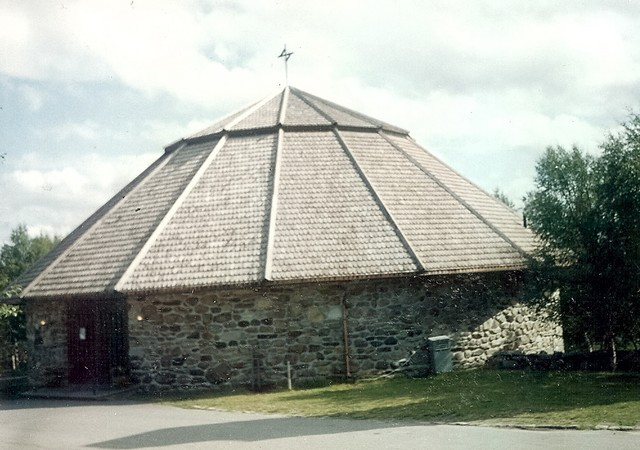
Exterior view of the church

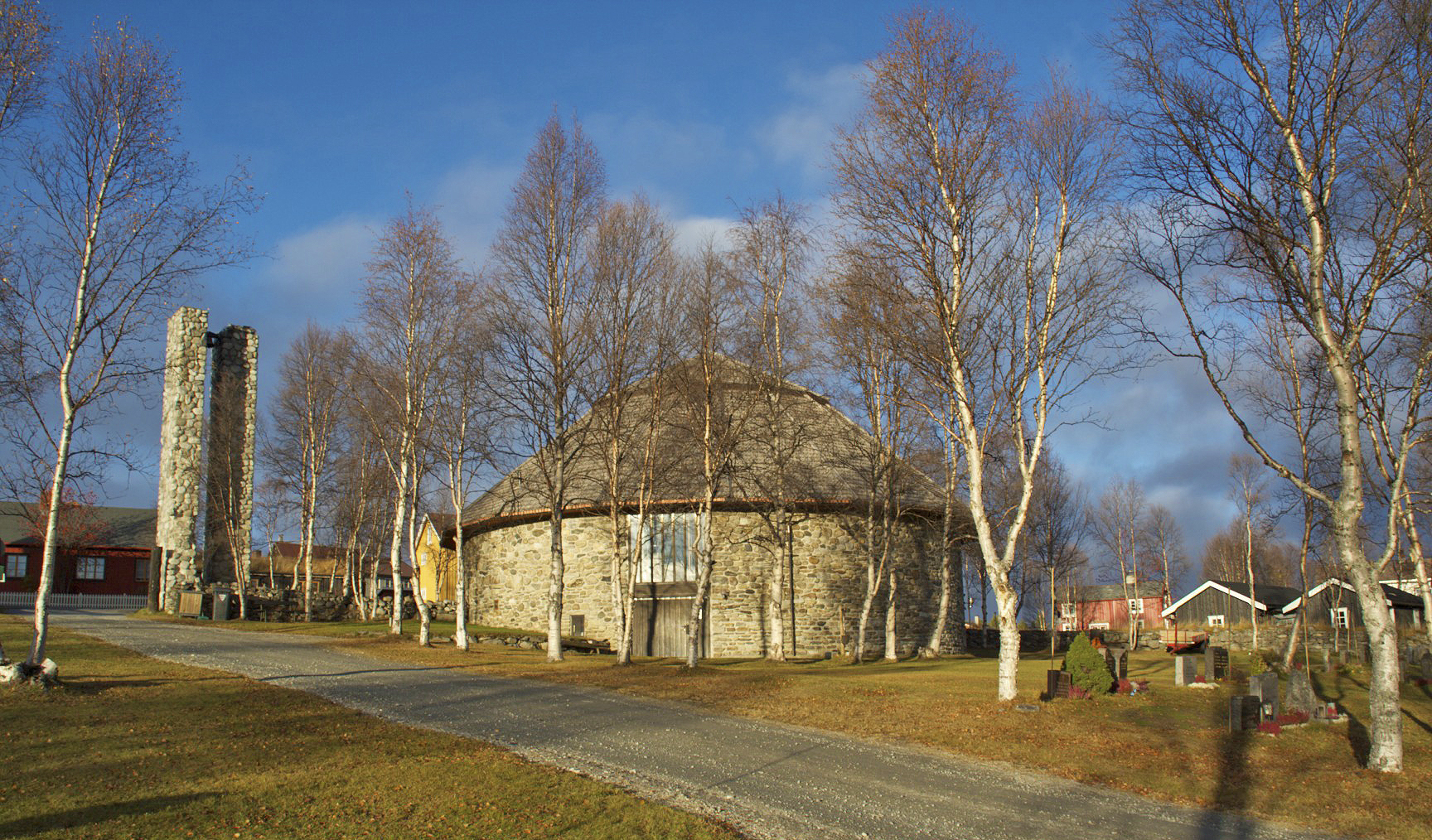
Another view of the church

== See also ==
- List of churches in Nidaros
