= Håsjøen =

Lake in Røros, Norway

- Interactive map of the lake
- Location: Røros Municipality, Trøndelag
- Coordinates: 62.4779°N 11.6778°E
- Primary inflows: Feragselva river
- Primary outflows: Rambergsjøen
- Catchment area: Glommadal
- Basin countries: Norway
- Max. length: 6.5 kilometres (4.0 mi)
- Max. width: 850 metres (2,790 ft)
- Surface area: 2.61 km^{2} (1.01 sq mi)
- Shore length^{1}: 19.5 kilometres (12.1 mi)
- Surface elevation: 648 metres (2,126 ft)
- References: NVE
- ^{1} Shore length is not a well-defined measure.

Håsjøen is a lake in Røros Municipality in Trøndelag county, Norway. The lake is located between the lakes Feragen and Rambergssjøen along the river Håelva. The 2.61-square-kilometre (1.01 sq mi) lake lies about 20 kilometres (12 mi) southeast of the town of Røros.

== See also ==
- List of lakes in Norway
