= Rørosmartnan =

Annual winter market in Røros, Norway

Rørosmartnan is an annual market and cultural event in the town of Røros in Røros Municipality in Trøndelag county, Norway. It takes place annually from the second to last Tuesday in February and lasts until the following Saturday. Rørosmartnan is a unique event with a typical attendance of 70,000 to 80,000 visitors. The market is a significant event for Røros and the whole surrounding area. The opening day is a spectacle, as around 80 horse-drawn sleds arrive with visitors from Sweden and the surrounding mountain villages, adding a touch of tradition and charm to the event.

== History ==
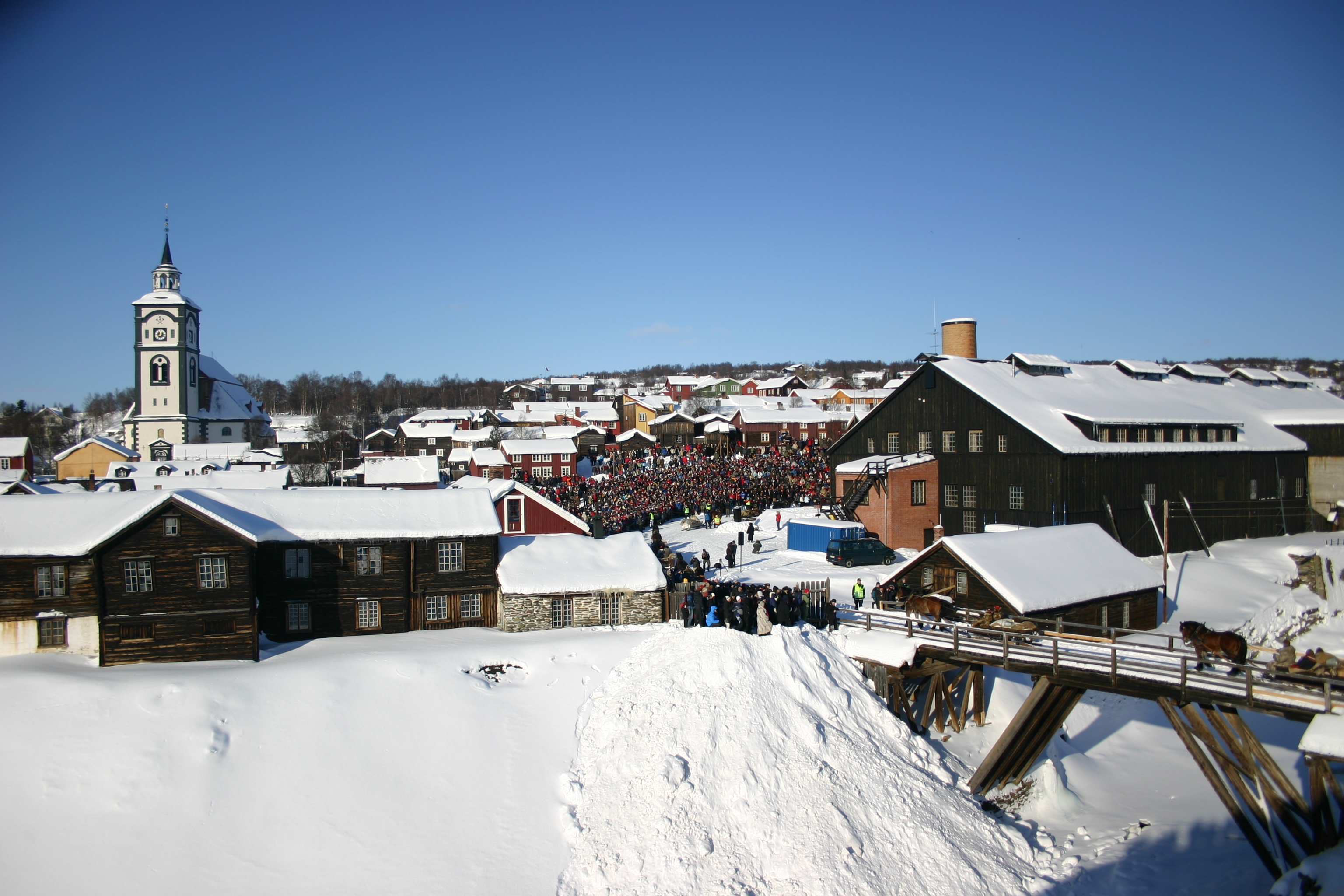
View of the opening of the Rørosmartnan on 20 Feb 2007

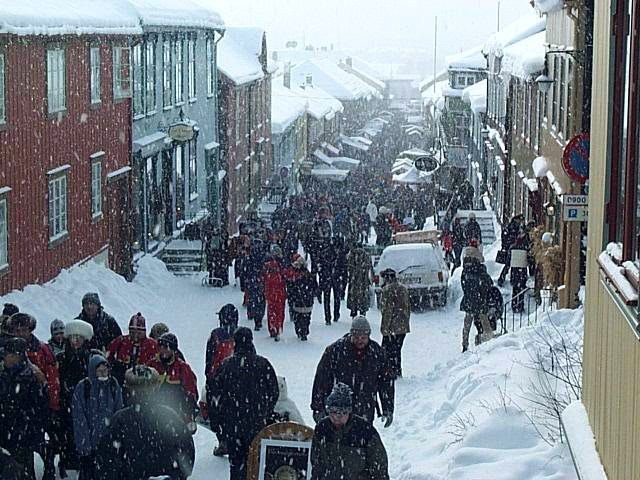
View of the market in 2001

Røros Copper Works originally monopolized all trade in the mining town of Røros. In the 1700s, the government stopped enforcing this monopoly as it was impossible to prevent the free exchange of goods. In 1801, a few merchants in Røros were granted permission to engage in trade for a fee. However, illegal trade in Røros only increased. In 1842, the merchants' trading privileges ended, which was largely meaningless when even the factory owners traded independently. After many years of pressure from Røros Municipality to the Ministry of the Interior, the first Rørosmartnan was held in 1854.

The market has a historical basis from a royal resolution from 1853 which stated: "From 1854 onwards, a market shall be held in Røros, starting on the next-to-last Tuesday in February and lasting until the following Friday." Later, the market was extended on more day to end on a Saturday.

In 1855, the market was visited by a couple of thousand people, mainly from the nearby areas, in addition to people from Gudbrandsdalen, Hedmark, and Sweden. Examples of goods traded included skins, grain and flour, fish, linen, and horses. Because so many people attended, the authorities needed the military to be present as security.

== Development ==
There existed a natural basis for the Rørosmartnan in the region, as people came to buy and sell their products, which contributed significantly to the economy. For this reason, Rørosmartnan developed independently during the initial years without planning or regulations. From the outset, there was a market fee that the vendors had to pay. It was the police's task to collect the fee, which can be described as an organizing function. Additional security was necessary to maintain peace and order during the market, and the guards were financed through the fees.

However, trade at Rørosmartnan declined around 1874, and after an application, a royal resolution was issued on 29 February 1877, stating that the market would be discontinued and no longer held after 1877. Many also believed that the opening of the Rørosbanen railway line would make the Rørosmartnan unnecessary, but the railroad instead sparked a revival for the market by bringing in more people and goods from new areas, and a new resolution was passed stating that the previous resolution for closure would not take effect. Eventually, it was seen that the organizing conditions changed as the local business community became more interested in Rørosmartnan.

After World War II, a new form of market committee emerged to plan the event. This included some members of the Røros Merchants' Association who cooperated. Interest in the Rørosmartnan again declined throughout the 1960s, after which the Røros Tourist and Travel Association (now called Opplev Røros AS) took over the entire event with several representatives from the business community and the municipality, gradually rekindling interest in the event.

== Development into the 21st Century. ==
Over the years, the Rørosmartnan has continued to grow and the variety of goods traded has expanded. Each year, more sales booths are set up, and the event is filled with the hustle and bustle of trade. In cafes and venues, old dance music sets the mood from early in the day until late at night, adding to the festive atmosphere of the market.

In 2015, an unofficial estimate of the number of visitors was made, and the organizers assumed that as many as 80,000 people had visited Rørosmartnan from the 17th through 21st of February that year.

== Opening ceremony ==
Rørosmartnan often has prominent guests to deliver the opening speech.

Year	Person	Position
2000	Stephan Tschudi-Madsen	Director of the Cultural Heritage fund, 1978 - 1991
2001	Paul Ottar Haga	Norwegian actor
2002	Thorbjørn Berntsen	Former Norwegian Minister of Climate and the Environment, 1990 - 1997
2003	Kåre Gjønnes	County Governor of Sør-Trøndelag County
2004	Marvin Wiseth	Executive Chief of Communications and Public Relations for Sparebank 1 SMN
2005	Jens Stoltenberg	Parliamentary leader for the Labour Party, 2001 - 2005
2006	Eva Zätterlund	Member of the Forbonden Kløvsjø
2007	Tore O. Sandvik	County Mayor of Sør-Trøndelag county, 2003 - 2018
2008	Åse Kleveland	Former Norwegian Minister of Culture, 1990 - 1996
2009	Heidi Sørensen	State Secretary in the Norwegian Ministry of Climate and Environment, 2007 - 2012
2010	Jørn Holme	Director of the Cultural Heritage Fund, 2009 - 2018
2011	Erling Aas-Eng	Mayor of Tolga Municipality, 2007 - 2011
2012	Per Edgar Kokkvold	Journalist and general secretary of the Norwegian Press Association
2013	Torbjørn Røe Isaksen	Parliamentary Representative for Conservative Party, 2009 - 2017
2014	Hans Vintervold	Mayor of Røros Municipality
2015	Tine Sundtoft	Current Norwegian Minister of Climate and Environment, 2013 - 2015
2016	Cathrine Pia Lund	Executive Director for the brand: Norge
2017	Linda Hofstad Helleland	Current Norwegian Minister of Culture, 2015 - 2018
2018	Axel Wernhoff	The Swedish ambassador to Norway, 2014 - 2018
2019	Hanna Geiran	Current Director of the Cultural Heritage Fund
2020	Iselin Nybø	Current Norwegian Minister of Trade, 2020 - 2021
2021	Cancelled due to the COVID-19 pandemic	
2022	Cancelled due to the COVID-19 pandemic	
2023	Tore O. Sandvik	Current County Mayor of Trøndelag County
2024	Jonas Gahr Støre	Current Prime Minister of Norway
