= Galåa =

Village in Røros Municipality, Norway

- Village
- Interactive map of Galåa
- Location within Trøndelag Location within Norway
- Coordinates: 62.55426°N 11.28733°E
- Country: Norway
- Region: Central Norway
- County: Trøndelag
- District: Gauldalen
- Municipality: Røros Municipality
- Elevation: 665 m (2,182 ft)
- Time zone: UTC+01:00 (CET)
  - Summer (DST): UTC+02:00 (CEST)
- Post Code: 7374 Røros

Galåa is a village in Røros Municipality in Trøndelag county, Norway. The village is located about 7 kilometres (4.3 mi) southwest of the town of Røros, along the river Glåma. It lies just 2.5 kilometres (1.6 mi) north of the municipal and county border with Os Municipality in Innlandet county.
