= Røros Municipality =

Municipality in Trøndelag, Norway

Røros Municipality Røros kommune Rossen tjïelte
- Municipality
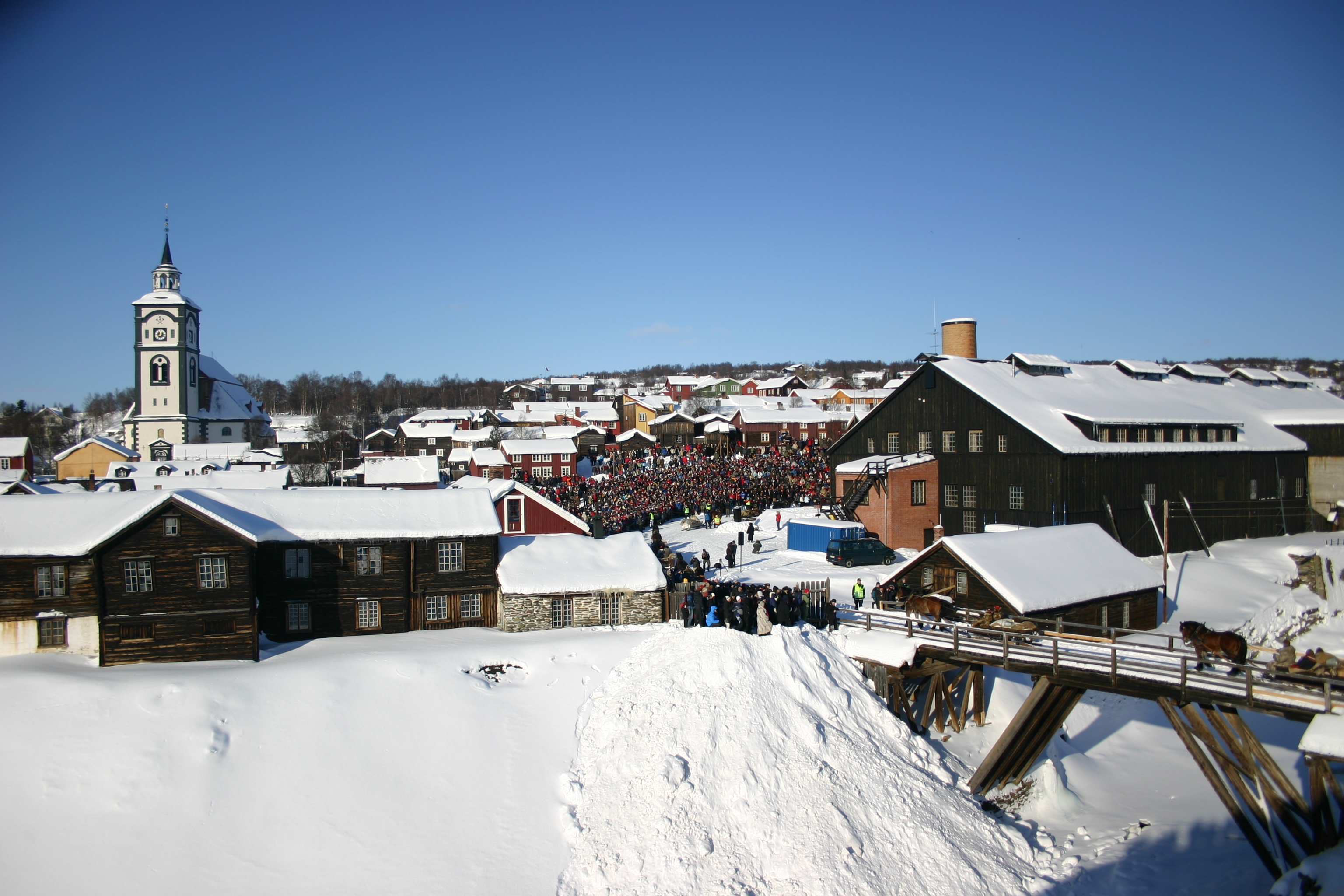
- View of the mining town of Røros

- Coat of arms

- Trøndelag within Norway

- Røros within Trøndelag
- Coordinates: 62°34′27″N 11°22′59″E
- Country: Norway
- County: Trøndelag
- District: Gauldal
- Established: 1 Jan 1838
  - Created as: Formannskapsdistrikt
- Administrative centre: Røros

Government
  - Mayor (2025): Sadmira Buljubašić (Ap)

Area
  - Total: 1,956.53 km^{2} (755.42 sq mi)
  - Land: 1,756.45 km^{2} (678.17 sq mi)
  - Water: 200.08 km^{2} (77.25 sq mi) 10.2%
  - Rank: #39 in Norway
- Highest elevation: 1,561.38 m (5,122.6 ft)

Population (2024)
  - Total: 5,685
  - Rank: #170 in Norway
  - Density: 2.9/km^{2} (7.5/sq mi)
  - Change (10 years): ▲ +1.8%
- Demonym: Rørosing

Official language
  - Norwegian form: Neutral
- Time zone: UTC+01:00 (CET)
  - Summer (DST): UTC+02:00 (CEST)
- ISO 3166 code: NO-5025
- Website: Official website
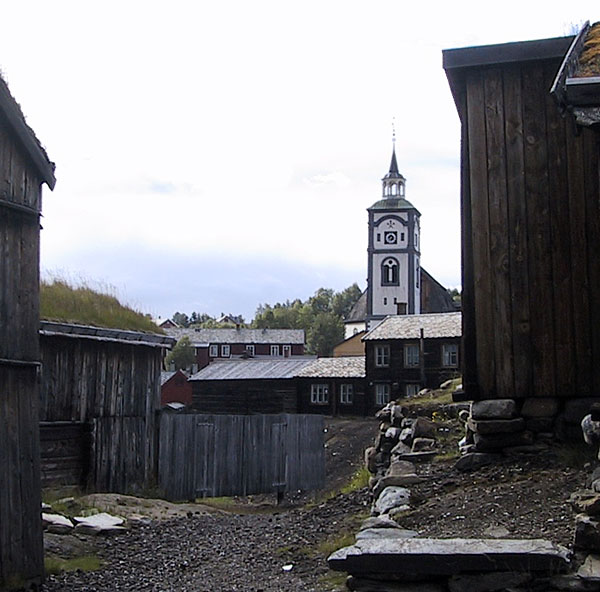
- The old Røros in front of the church

UNESCO World Heritage Site
- Official name: Røros Mining Town and the Circumference
- Criteria: Cultural: iii, iv, v
- Reference: 55
- Inscription: 1980 (4th Session)
- Extensions: 2010
- Area: 16,510 ha (64 mi^{2})
- Buffer zone: 481,240 ha (1,858 mi^{2})

Røros or Rosse (Southern Sami) is a municipality in Trøndelag county, Norway. The administrative centre of the municipality is the town of Røros. Some of the villages in Røros include Brekken, Glåmos, Feragen, Galåa, and Hitterdalen.

The 1,957-square-kilometre (756 sq mi) municipality is the 39th largest by area out of the 357 municipalities in Norway. Røros Municipality is the 170th most populous municipality in Norway with a population of 5,685. The municipality's population density is 2.9 inhabitants per square kilometre (7.5/sq mi) and its population has increased by 1.8% over the previous 10-year period.

The mining town of Røros (the administrative centre of the municipality) is sometimes called Bergstaden which means "mountain town" due to its historical renown for copper mining. It is one of two towns in Norway that were historically designated "mining towns", along with the "silver-town" of Kongsberg. Many of the modern-day inhabitants of the town of Røros still work and live in the characteristic 17th and 18th century buildings which led to its designation as a UNESCO World Heritage Site in 1980. The town of Røros has about 80 historic wooden houses, most of them standing around courtyards. Many retain their dark pitch-log facades, giving the town a medieval appearance.

== General information ==
The parish of Røros was established as a municipality on 1 January 1838 (see formannskapsdistrikt law). On 1 January 1875, an unpopulated area of the neighbouring Ålen Municipality was transferred to Røros Municipality. On 1 January 1926, Røros Municipality was divided into four separate municipalities: Røros landsogn (population: 701) in the south and west, Brekken Municipality (population: 1,098) in the east, and Glåmos Municipality (population: 983) in the north. The remaining part of Røros, mostly areas surrounding and including the town of Røros (population: 2,284) remained as a much smaller Røros Municipality.

During the 1960s, there were many municipal mergers across Norway due to the work of the Schei Committee. On 1 January 1964, Røros Municipality (population: 3,063) was merged with its three neighbors: Glåmos Municipality (population: 700), Brekken Municipality (population: 964), and Røros landsogn (population: 482) to recreate the large Røros Municipality that existed prior to 1926. On 21 April 1989, an unpopulated part of Røros Municipality was transferred to the neighbouring Holtålen Municipality.

On 1 January 2018, the municipality switched from the old Sør-Trøndelag county to the new Trøndelag county.

=== Name ===
The municipality (originally the parish and town) is named after the old Røros farm (Old Norse: Røyðaróss) since this was the site of the mining town of Røros. The first element comes from the local river name Røa (Røyðr) which has an unknown meaning. The last element comes from óss which means "mouth of a river" (the small river Røa runs into the great river Glåma here).

On 9 September 2022, the national government approved a resolution to add a co-equal, official Sami language name for the municipality: Rosse. The spelling of the Sami language name changes depending on how it is used. It is called Rosse when it is spelled alone, but it is Rossen tjïelte when using the Sami language equivalent to "Røros municipality".

=== Coat of arms ===
The coat of arms was granted on 29 October 1992. The blazon is "Gules, a venus symbol over a crossed hammer and chisel Or" (Norwegian: I rødt, en gull kobber (venus-symbol) over korslagt bergjarn og feisel). This means the arms have a red field (background) and the charge is a venus symbol over a crossed hammer and chisel. The charge has a tincture of Or which means it is commonly colored yellow, but if it is made out of metal, then gold is used. The design symbolizes the copper mining industry in Røros. The venus symbol is the old symbol for copper, which was heavily mined in Røros for centuries. The arms were designed by Sverre Ødegaard. The municipal flag has the same design as the coat of arms.

=== Churches ===
The Church of Norway has four parishes (sokn) within Røros Municipality. It is part of the Gauldal prosti (deanery) in the Diocese of Nidaros.

Churches in Røros Municipality
| Parish (sokn) | Church name | Location of the church | Year built |
|---|---|---|---|
| Røros | Røros Church | Røros | 1784 |
| Røros | Røros Chapel | Røros | 1962 |
| Brekken | Brekken Church | Brekken | 1878 |
| Glåmos | Glåmos Church | Glåmos | 1926 |
| Hitterdalen | Hitterdal Chapel | Hitterdalen | 1959 |

== History ==
Røros Municipality has historically been used by the Southern Sami people for reindeer herding. Known for its copper mines, the town of Røros is one of Norway's two nationally significant mining towns with activity starting in the 17th century (the other one being the "silver-town" Kongsberg since it is the location of the Kongsberg Silver Mines). The Røros Copper Works was in operation in the area for over 330 years.

Røros and its people were made famous to Norwegians at the turn of the 20th century by semi-fictional author Johan Falkberget, who told the story of the mining community from the perspective of the hard-tested miners at the bottom of the social ladder.

With its authentic wooden buildings, Røros was added to the UNESCO World Heritage Site list in 1980.

== Government ==
Røros Municipality is responsible for primary education (through 10th grade), outpatient health services, senior citizen services, welfare and other social services, zoning, economic development, and municipal roads and utilities. The municipality is governed by a municipal council of directly elected representatives. The mayor is indirectly elected by a vote of the municipal council. The municipality is under the jurisdiction of the Trøndelag District Court and the Frostating Court of Appeal.

=== Municipal council ===
The municipal council (Kommunestyre) of Røros Municipality is made up of 27 representatives who are elected to four-year terms. The tables below show the current and historical composition of the council by political party.

Røros kommunestyre 2023–2027
| Party name (in Norwegian) | Number of representatives |
|---|---|
| Labour Party (Arbeiderpartiet) | 12 |
| Conservative Party (Høyre) | 5 |
| Red Party (Rødt) | 1 |
| Centre Party (Senterpartiet) | 3 |
| Socialist Left Party (Sosialistisk Venstreparti) | 3 |
| Liberal Party (Venstre) | 2 |
| Røros List (Røroslista) | 1 |
| Total number of members: | 27 |

Røros kommunestyre 2019–2024
| Party name (in Norwegian) | Number of representatives |
|---|---|
| Labour Party (Arbeiderpartiet) | 11 |
| Conservative Party (Høyre) | 4 |
| Centre Party (Senterpartiet) | 6 |
| Socialist Left Party (Sosialistisk Venstreparti) | 4 |
| Liberal Party (Venstre) | 1 |
| Røros List (Røroslista) | 1 |
| Total number of members: | 27 |

Røros kommunestyre 2015–2019
| Party name (in Norwegian) | Number of representatives |
|---|---|
| Labour Party (Arbeiderpartiet) | 11 |
| Conservative Party (Høyre) | 5 |
| Centre Party (Senterpartiet) | 3 |
| Socialist Left Party (Sosialistisk Venstreparti) | 4 |
| Liberal Party (Venstre) | 2 |
| Røros List (Røroslista) | 2 |
| Total number of members: | 27 |

Røros kommunestyre 2011–2015
| Party name (in Norwegian) | Number of representatives |
|---|---|
| Labour Party (Arbeiderpartiet) | 14 |
| Progress Party (Fremskrittspartiet) | 1 |
| Conservative Party (Høyre) | 4 |
| Centre Party (Senterpartiet) | 2 |
| Socialist Left Party (Sosialistisk Venstreparti) | 3 |
| Liberal Party (Venstre) | 1 |
| Røros List (Røroslista) | 2 |
| Total number of members: | 27 |

Røros kommunestyre 2007–2011
| Party name (in Norwegian) | Number of representatives |
|---|---|
| Labour Party (Arbeiderpartiet) | 12 |
| Progress Party (Fremskrittspartiet) | 2 |
| Conservative Party (Høyre) | 4 |
| Centre Party (Senterpartiet) | 2 |
| Socialist Left Party (Sosialistisk Venstreparti) | 3 |
| Liberal Party (Venstre) | 1 |
| Røros List (Røroslista) | 3 |
| Total number of members: | 27 |

Røros kommunestyre 2003–2007
| Party name (in Norwegian) | Number of representatives |
|---|---|
| Labour Party (Arbeiderpartiet) | 12 |
| Progress Party (Fremskrittspartiet) | 2 |
| Conservative Party (Høyre) | 2 |
| Pensioners' Party (Pensjonistpartiet) | 1 |
| Socialist Left Party (Sosialistisk Venstreparti) | 5 |
| Joint list of the Centre Party (Senterpartiet) and the Liberal Party (Venstre) | 3 |
| Røros List (Røroslista) | 2 |
| Total number of members: | 27 |

Røros kommunestyre 1999–2003
| Party name (in Norwegian) | Number of representatives |
|---|---|
| Labour Party (Arbeiderpartiet) | 14 |
| Conservative Party (Høyre) | 4 |
| Pensioners' Party (Pensjonistpartiet) | 1 |
| Socialist Left Party (Sosialistisk Venstreparti) | 2 |
| Joint list of the Centre Party (Senterpartiet) and the Liberal Party (Venstre) | 3 |
| Røros List (Røroslista) | 3 |
| Total number of members: | 27 |

Røros kommunestyre 1995–1999
| Party name (in Norwegian) | Number of representatives |
|---|---|
| Labour Party (Arbeiderpartiet) | 10 |
| Conservative Party (Høyre) | 2 |
| Socialist Left Party (Sosialistisk Venstreparti) | 2 |
| Joint list of the Centre Party (Senterpartiet) and the Liberal Party (Venstre) | 10 |
| Røros List (Røroslista) | 3 |
| Total number of members: | 27 |

Røros kommunestyre 1991–1995
| Party name (in Norwegian) | Number of representatives |
|---|---|
| Labour Party (Arbeiderpartiet) | 11 |
| Conservative Party (Høyre) | 4 |
| Socialist Left Party (Sosialistisk Venstreparti) | 4 |
| Joint list of the Centre Party (Senterpartiet) and the Liberal Party (Venstre) | 5 |
| Cross-party environment list (Tverrpolitisk miljøliste) | 3 |
| Total number of members: | 27 |

Røros kommunestyre 1987–1991
| Party name (in Norwegian) | Number of representatives |
|---|---|
| Labour Party (Arbeiderpartiet) | 14 |
| Conservative Party (Høyre) | 5 |
| Red Electoral Alliance (Rød Valgallianse) | 1 |
| Socialist Left Party (Sosialistisk Venstreparti) | 3 |
| Joint list of the Centre Party (Senterpartiet), Christian Democratic Party (Kristelig Folkeparti), and Liberal Party (Venstre) | 4 |
| Total number of members: | 27 |

Røros kommunestyre 1983–1987
| Party name (in Norwegian) | Number of representatives |
|---|---|
| Labour Party (Arbeiderpartiet) | 16 |
| Conservative Party (Høyre) | 5 |
| Red Electoral Alliance (Rød Valgallianse) | 1 |
| Centre Party (Senterpartiet) | 2 |
| Socialist Left Party (Sosialistisk Venstreparti) | 2 |
| Liberal Party (Venstre) | 1 |
| Total number of members: | 27 |

Røros kommunestyre 1979–1983
| Party name (in Norwegian) | Number of representatives |
|---|---|
| Labour Party (Arbeiderpartiet) | 14 |
| Conservative Party (Høyre) | 5 |
| Christian Democratic Party (Kristelig Folkeparti) | 1 |
| Red Electoral Alliance (Rød Valgallianse) | 1 |
| Centre Party (Senterpartiet) | 3 |
| Joint list of the Liberal Party (Venstre) and New People's Party (Nye Folkepartiet) | 2 |
| Joint list of the Socialist Left Party (Sosialistisk Venstreparti) and the Communist Party (Kommunistiske Parti) | 1 |
| Total number of members: | 27 |

Røros kommunestyre 1975–1979
| Party name (in Norwegian) | Number of representatives |
|---|---|
| Labour Party (Arbeiderpartiet) | 14 |
| Conservative Party (Høyre) | 3 |
| Christian Democratic Party (Kristelig Folkeparti) | 1 |
| Centre Party (Senterpartiet) | 4 |
| Socialist Left Party (Sosialistisk Venstreparti) | 3 |
| Liberal Party (Venstre) | 2 |
| Total number of members: | 27 |

Røros kommunestyre 1971–1975
| Party name (in Norwegian) | Number of representatives |
|---|---|
| Labour Party (Arbeiderpartiet) | 15 |
| Conservative Party (Høyre) | 2 |
| Christian Democratic Party (Kristelig Folkeparti) | 1 |
| Centre Party (Senterpartiet) | 3 |
| Liberal Party (Venstre) | 3 |
| Socialist common list (Venstresosialistiske felleslister) | 3 |
| Total number of members: | 27 |

Røros kommunestyre 1967–1971
| Party name (in Norwegian) | Number of representatives |
|---|---|
| Labour Party (Arbeiderpartiet) | 16 |
| Conservative Party (Høyre) | 2 |
| Communist Party (Kommunistiske Parti) | 1 |
| Christian Democratic Party (Kristelig Folkeparti) | 1 |
| Centre Party (Senterpartiet) | 2 |
| Socialist People's Party (Sosialistisk Folkeparti) | 2 |
| Liberal Party (Venstre) | 3 |
| Total number of members: | 27 |

Røros kommunestyre 1963–1967
| Party name (in Norwegian) | Number of representatives |
|---|---|
| Labour Party (Arbeiderpartiet) | 18 |
| Conservative Party (Høyre) | 3 |
| Communist Party (Kommunistiske Parti) | 1 |
| Christian Democratic Party (Kristelig Folkeparti) | 1 |
| Liberal Party (Venstre) | 2 |
| Local List(s) (Lokale lister) | 2 |
| Total number of members: | 27 |

Røros herredsstyre 1959–1963
| Party name (in Norwegian) | Number of representatives |
|---|---|
| Labour Party (Arbeiderpartiet) | 10 |
| Conservative Party (Høyre) | 2 |
| Communist Party (Kommunistiske Parti) | 2 |
| Christian Democratic Party (Kristelig Folkeparti) | 1 |
| Liberal Party (Venstre) | 2 |
| Total number of members: | 17 |

Røros herredsstyre 1955–1959
| Party name (in Norwegian) | Number of representatives |
|---|---|
| Labour Party (Arbeiderpartiet) | 10 |
| Conservative Party (Høyre) | 2 |
| Communist Party (Kommunistiske Parti) | 2 |
| Christian Democratic Party (Kristelig Folkeparti) | 2 |
| Liberal Party (Venstre) | 1 |
| Total number of members: | 17 |

Røros herredsstyre 1951–1955
| Party name (in Norwegian) | Number of representatives |
|---|---|
| Labour Party (Arbeiderpartiet) | 9 |
| Communist Party (Kommunistiske Parti) | 3 |
| Liberal Party (Venstre) | 2 |
| List of workers, fishermen, and small farmholders (Arbeidere, fiskere, småbrukere liste) | 1 |
| Local List(s) (Lokale lister) | 1 |
| Total number of members: | 16 |

Røros herredsstyre 1947–1951
| Party name (in Norwegian) | Number of representatives |
|---|---|
| Labour Party (Arbeiderpartiet) | 8 |
| Communist Party (Kommunistiske Parti) | 3 |
| Liberal Party (Venstre) | 5 |
| Total number of members: | 16 |

Røros herredsstyre 1945–1947
| Party name (in Norwegian) | Number of representatives |
|---|---|
| Labour Party (Arbeiderpartiet) | 9 |
| Communist Party (Kommunistiske Parti) | 3 |
| Local List(s) (Lokale lister) | 4 |
| Total number of members: | 16 |

Røros herredsstyre 1937–1941*
| Party name (in Norwegian) | Number of representatives |
|---|---|
| Labour Party (Arbeiderpartiet) | 9 |
| Communist Party (Kommunistiske Parti) | 2 |
| Joint List(s) of Non-Socialist Parties (Borgerlige Felleslister) | 5 |
| Total number of members: | 16 |
Note: Due to the German occupation of Norway during World War II, no elections were held for new municipal councils until after the war ended in 1945.

=== Mayors ===
The mayor (Norwegian: ordfører) of Røros is the political leader of the municipality and the chairperson of the municipal council. Here is a list of people who have held this position:

- 1838–1845: Knud Olsen
- 1846–1847: Peter Ascanius Schult
- 1848–1850: Julius Begtrup
- 1851–1856: Diderik Iversen Tønseth
- 1857–1860: Johannes Berg
- 1861–1882: Diderik Iversen Tønseth (V)
- 1883–1901: Anders Bergan (V)
- 1902–1904: Marius Müller (H)
- 1905–1913: Lars T. Ormhaug (V)
- 1914–1919: Lars Tørres (Ap)
- 1920–1922: Johannes Iv. Ødegaard (Ap)
- 1923–1925: Anders O. Sandkjernan (Bp)
- 1926–1928: Johan Kvikne (Ap)
- 1929–1934: Aksel Selboe (Ap)
- 1935–1940: Olav Guldahl (Ap)
- 1941–1942: Henrik Grønn (NS)
- 1942–1945: Odd Johnsen (NS)
- 1945–1947: Olav Guldahl (Ap)
- 1948–1951: Ole Halden (Ap)
- 1952–1967: Ole J. Kværneng (Ap)
- 1968–1971: Per A. Strickert (Ap)
- 1972–1973: Rolf Køste (Ap)
- 1973–1975: Per A. Strickert (Ap)
- 1976–1979: Knut W. Larssen (Ap)
- 1980–1987: Erling Sven Busch (Ap)
- 1987–1987: Anders Døhl (Ap)
- 1988–1993: Arne Kokkvoll (Ap)
- 1993–1999: Even Erlien (Sp)
- 1999–2007: John Helge Andersen (Ap)
- 2007–2019: Hans Vintervold (Ap)
- 2019–2025: Isak Veierud Busch (Ap)
- 2025–present: Sadmira Buljubašić (Ap)

== Geography ==
Røros Municipality is located on a gently sloping plateau about 630 metres (2,070 ft) above sea level that is forested with mostly birch and some pine, but the tree line is never far away. The highest point in the municipality is the 1,561.38-metre (5,122.6 ft) tall mountain Storviglen. The largest lake within the municipality is Aursunden and the river Glåma has its origin here. The most northerly part of the lake Femunden, the third largest lake in Norway, is located in Røros, just west of Femundsmarka National Park. These lakes and others in Røros, such as Bolagen and Flensjøen, are well suited for kayaking and fishing. Other lakes include Feragen, Håsjøen, Rambergssjøen, Korssjøen, Nedre Roasten, Rogen, and Rien.

=== Climate ===
Røros has a subarctic climate. Mostly sheltered from oceanic influences, and located at ca 650 m amsl, Røros has recorded the coldest temperatures in the southern half of Norway with −50.3 °C (−58.5 °F) in early January 1914. In the European cold snap of January 2010 Røros recorded low of −42 °C (−44 °F). The coldest months recorded are January 1941 and January 1942, both with mean −20.6 °C (−5.1 °F), and average daily low −26.9 °C (−16.4 °F) in January 1941. Winters at Røros are reliably cold. The warmest January (1973) had mean −2.8 °C (27.0 °F), the warmest winter month on record was December 2006 with mean −0.5 °C (31.1 °F), and the warmest March (2012) had mean −0.3 °C (31.5 °F). The heat record 30.7 °C (87.3 °F) was recorded in July 2008. The warmest month on record is July 2014 with mean 16 °C (61 °F), while July 2018 had the warmest average daily high with 23.3 °C (73.9 °F).

Skiing conditions in winter are usually excellent, with the period from February to April being the optimum, as the sun is higher and the days longer than earlier in winter. The deepest snow depth recorded in Røros is 200 centimetres (79 in) in March 1956. In more recent years, 87 centimetres (34 in) snow on the ground was recorded in March 2009. Snow on the ground is virtually guaranteed in Røros from December to early April. Early May 1997 saw 76 cm snow on the ground (source: eklima/met.no).

Haugan, an unincorporated settlement situated 2 kilometres (1.2 mi) from Røros Airport, is the location of a weather station operated by the Norwegian Meteorologist institute. (Norwegian: Meteorologisk institutt).

All the record lows are old, the most recent (December) from 1978, while more than half of the monthly record highs are from year 2000 or later.

Climate data for Røros (625 m; 1981 - 2010; precipitation days 1961-90, extremes 1900 - 2018)
| Month | Jan | Feb | Mar | Apr | May | Jun | Jul | Aug | Sep | Oct | Nov | Dec | Year |
|---|---|---|---|---|---|---|---|---|---|---|---|---|---|
| Record high °C (°F) | 10.4 (50.7) | 10.8 (51.4) | 14.5 (58.1) | 19.0 (66.2) | 26.7 (80.1) | 29.5 (85.1) | 30.7 (87.3) | 29.8 (85.6) | 25.7 (78.3) | 21.2 (70.2) | 11.8 (53.2) | 7.6 (45.7) | 30.7 (87.3) |
| Mean daily maximum °C (°F) | −4.9 (23.2) | −3.6 (25.5) | 0.3 (32.5) | 4.8 (40.6) | 11 (52) | 15.2 (59.4) | 18.1 (64.6) | 16.4 (61.5) | 11.4 (52.5) | 5.1 (41.2) | −1 (30) | −4.8 (23.4) | 5.7 (42.2) |
| Daily mean °C (°F) | −9.6 (14.7) | −8.8 (16.2) | −4.8 (23.4) | 0.3 (32.5) | 5.8 (42.4) | 9.9 (49.8) | 12.7 (54.9) | 11.4 (52.5) | 7.1 (44.8) | 1.7 (35.1) | −4.5 (23.9) | −9.4 (15.1) | 1.0 (33.8) |
| Mean daily minimum °C (°F) | −14.4 (6.1) | −13.9 (7.0) | −9.9 (14.2) | −4.2 (24.4) | 0.6 (33.1) | 4.5 (40.1) | 7.2 (45.0) | 6.4 (43.5) | 2.6 (36.7) | −1.8 (28.8) | −8 (18) | −14 (7) | −3.7 (25.3) |
| Record low °C (°F) | −50.3 (−58.5) | −43.5 (−46.3) | −41.0 (−41.8) | −32.3 (−26.1) | −18.9 (−2.0) | −5.6 (21.9) | −3.4 (25.9) | −4.9 (23.2) | −11.3 (11.7) | −28.4 (−19.1) | −36.4 (−33.5) | −44.0 (−47.2) | −50.3 (−58.5) |
| Average precipitation mm (inches) | 39.3 (1.55) | 32 (1.3) | 25.9 (1.02) | 24.7 (0.97) | 33.6 (1.32) | 58.6 (2.31) | 75.8 (2.98) | 74.3 (2.93) | 50.8 (2.00) | 37.8 (1.49) | 36.4 (1.43) | 35 (1.4) | 524.2 (20.7) |
| Average precipitation days (≥ 1.0 mm) | 9 | 8 | 7 | 7 | 7 | 9 | 12 | 11 | 12 | 10 | 10 | 11 | 113 |
Source 1: Meteo climat stats
Source 2: met.no/eklima

== Transportation ==
The municipality is served by the Rørosbanen railway line at Røros Station. Røros Airport has a scheduled service to Oslo. Norwegian County Road 30 (Fylkesvei 30) connects Røros to the south to Tynset Municipality and northwest down the Gaula valley towards Trondheim. There is also the Norwegian County Road 705 going north to Selbu Municipality and Stjørdal Municipality, and the Norwegian County Road 31 (Fylkesvei 31) going east to Sweden.

== Culture ==
- During winter, a traditional market called "Rørosmartnan" is organized and that draws an average of 60,000–70,000 tourists each year. The market begins on the last Tuesday in February and lasts five days.
- The town of Røros was the filming location for Henrik Ibsen's play "A Doll's House", directed by Joseph Losey.

=== Media ===
The newspapers Arbeidets Rett and Fjell-Ljom are both published in Røros.

== Notable people ==
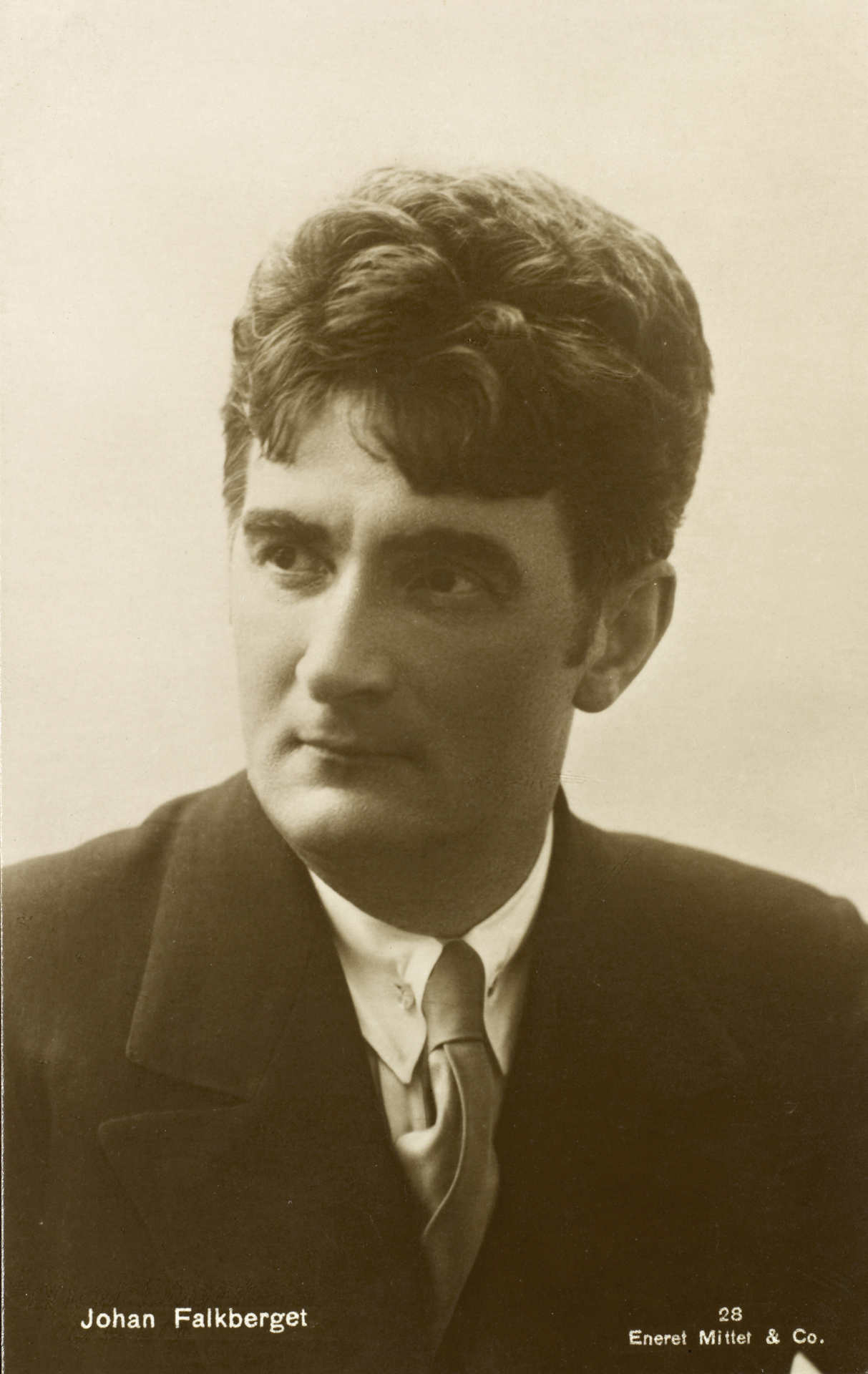
Johan Falkberget

- Ole Andreas Bachke (1830 in Røros – 1890), a jurist and Norwegian government minister
- Per Bergersen (1960–1990 in Røros), a musician
- Even Erlien (born 1955), a Norwegian politician and mayor of Røros Municipality until 1999
- Johan Falkberget (1879 in Røros – 1967), an author and nominee for the Nobel Prize in Literature
- Magnus Falkberget (1900 in Røros – 1957), an actor and theatre manager
- Per Edgar Kokkvold (born 1946 in Røros), a journalist and chair of the Norwegian Broadcasting Council
- Synnøve Korssjøen (born 1949 in Røros), a goldsmith
- Lorentz Lossius (1589–1654), a German-born, Norwegian mining engineer and founder of the Røros Copper Works (Røros Kobberverk)
- Sven Nyhus (born 1932 in Røros), a folk musician, fiddler, composer, and musicologist
- Dag Rune Olsen (born 1962 in Røros), a cancer researcher and professor of biomedical physics
- Michael Rosing (1756 in Røros – 1818), a Norwegian-Danish actor
- Johannes Smemo (1898 in Rugldalen – 1973), a theologian and Bishop of Oslo from 1951 to 1968

=== Sport ===
- Stein Erik Gullikstad (born 1952 in Røros), a Nordic combined skier who competed at the 1976 Winter Olympics
- Monicha Nergaard (born 1968), a Norwegian archer and Norwegian championship gold medalist
- Kjell Jakob Sollie (born 1953 in Røros), a cross-country skier who competed at the 1980 Winter Olympics

== Media gallery ==
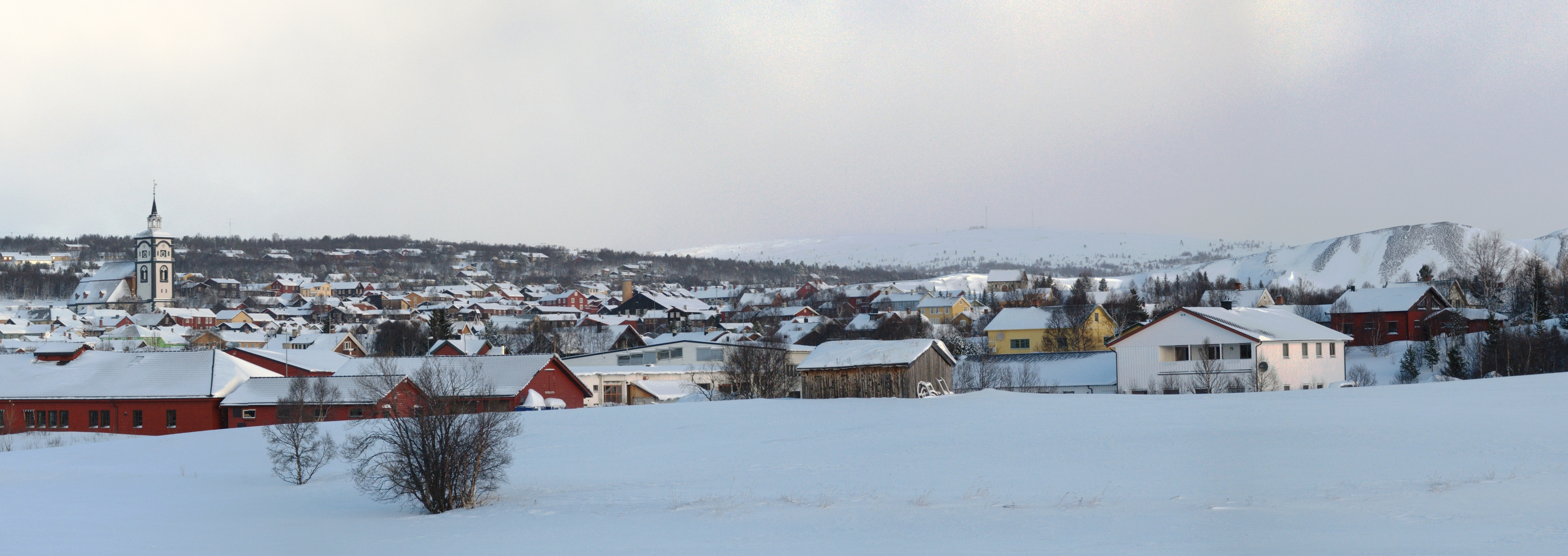
Overview Røros

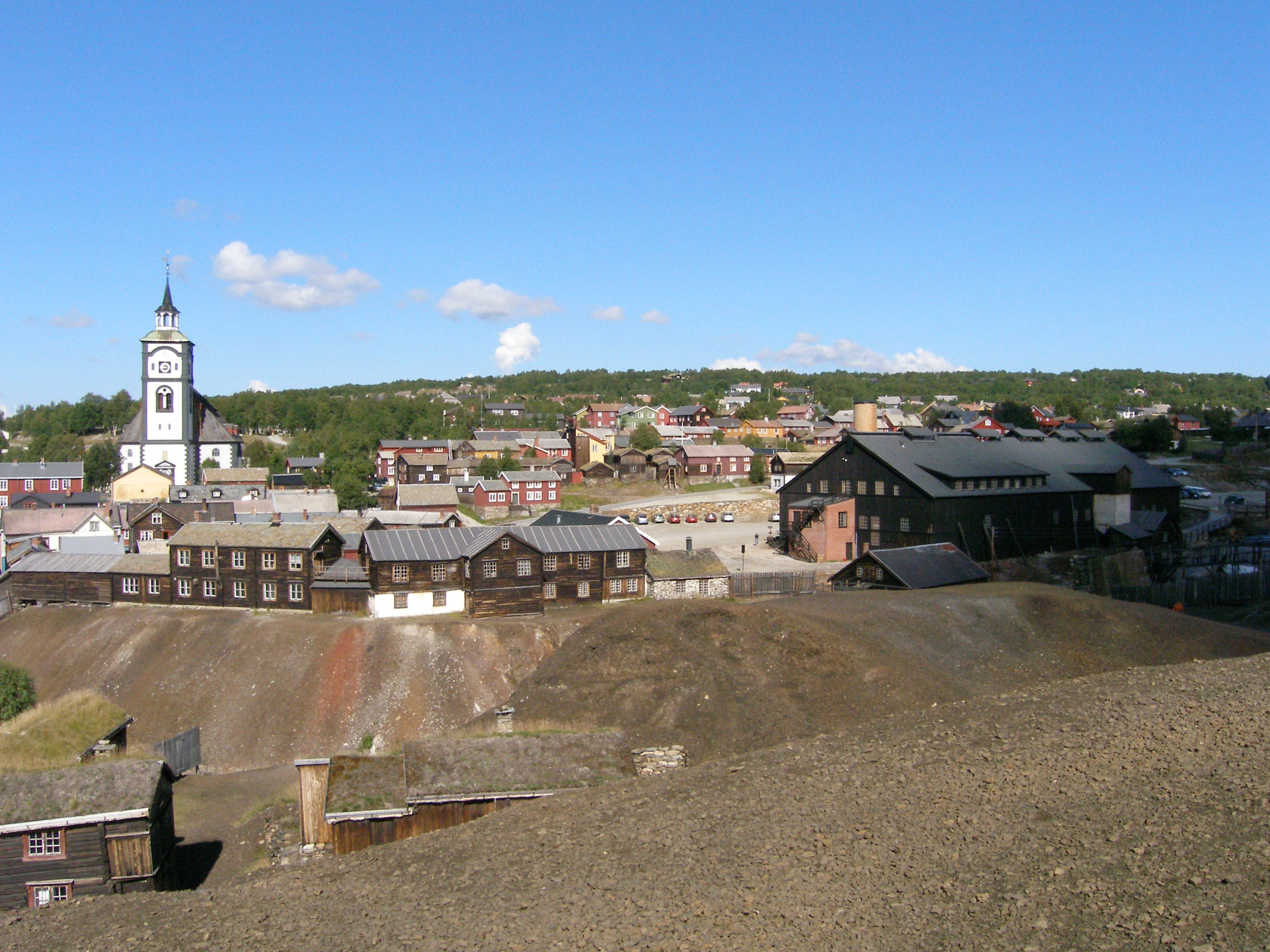
Røros in summer

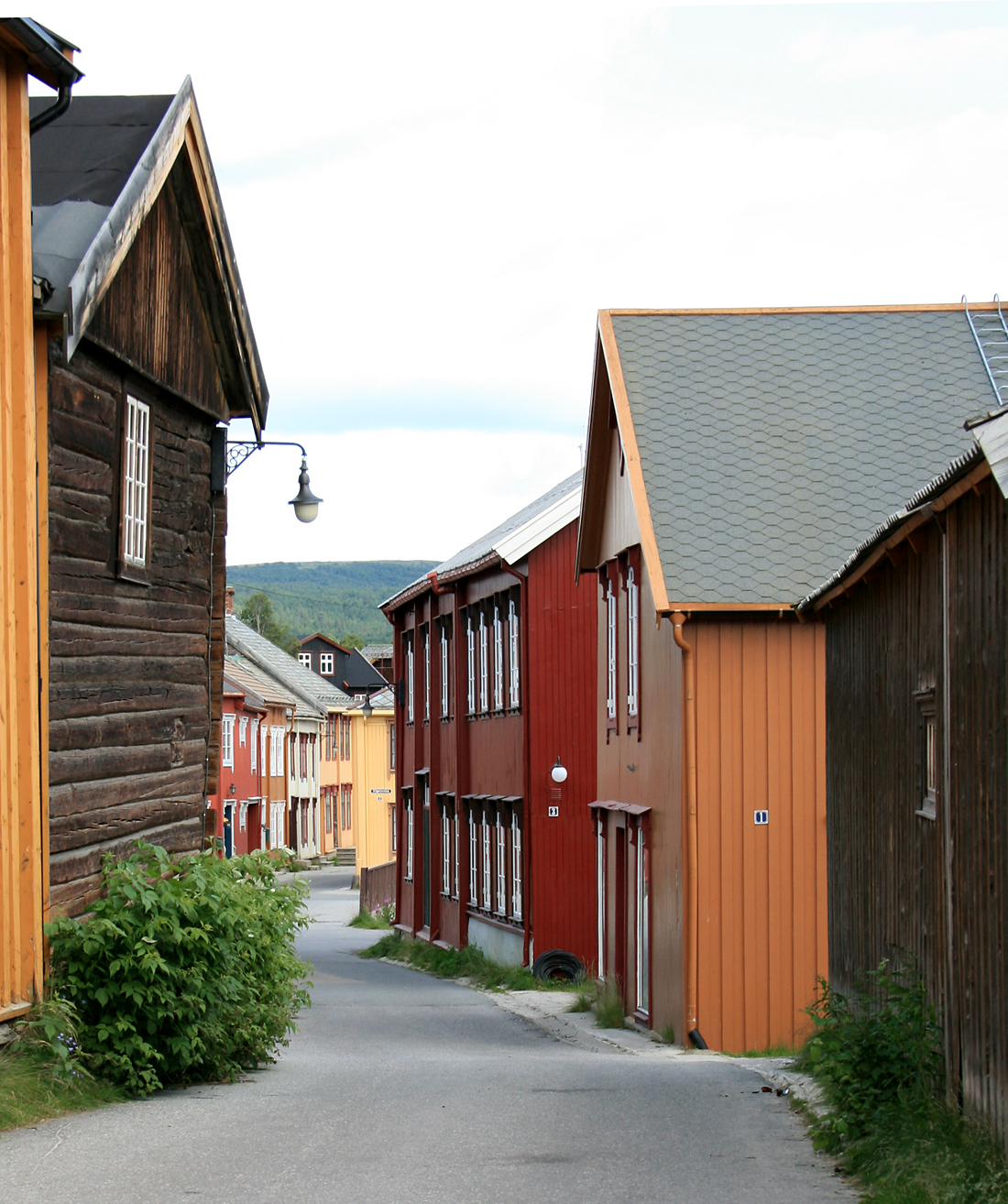
Finneveta, one of the narrow old streets in Røros

Røros filmed by WMNO Drone mai 2018

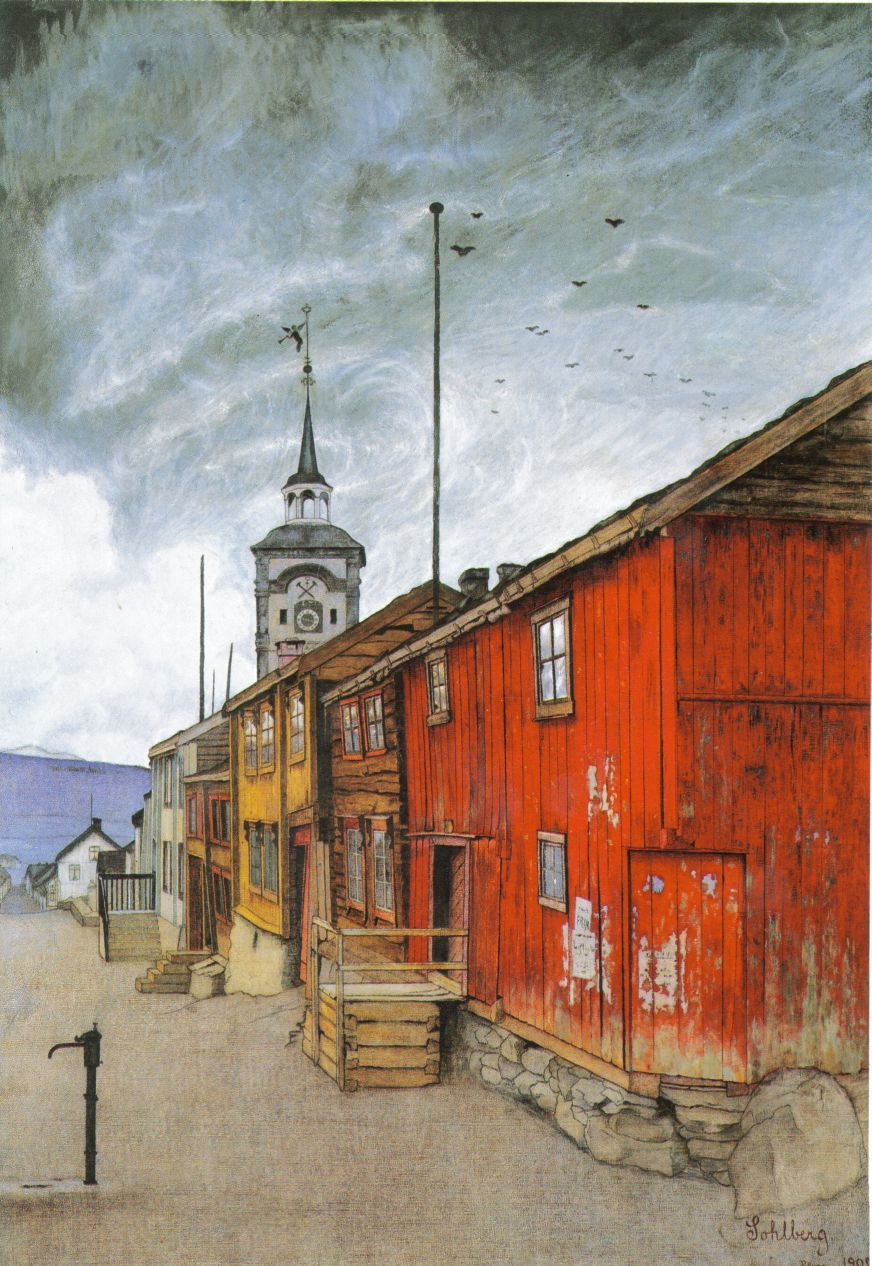
Fra Røros (Lillegaten), painting by Harald Sohlberg, 1902 (titled from Røros (side street))

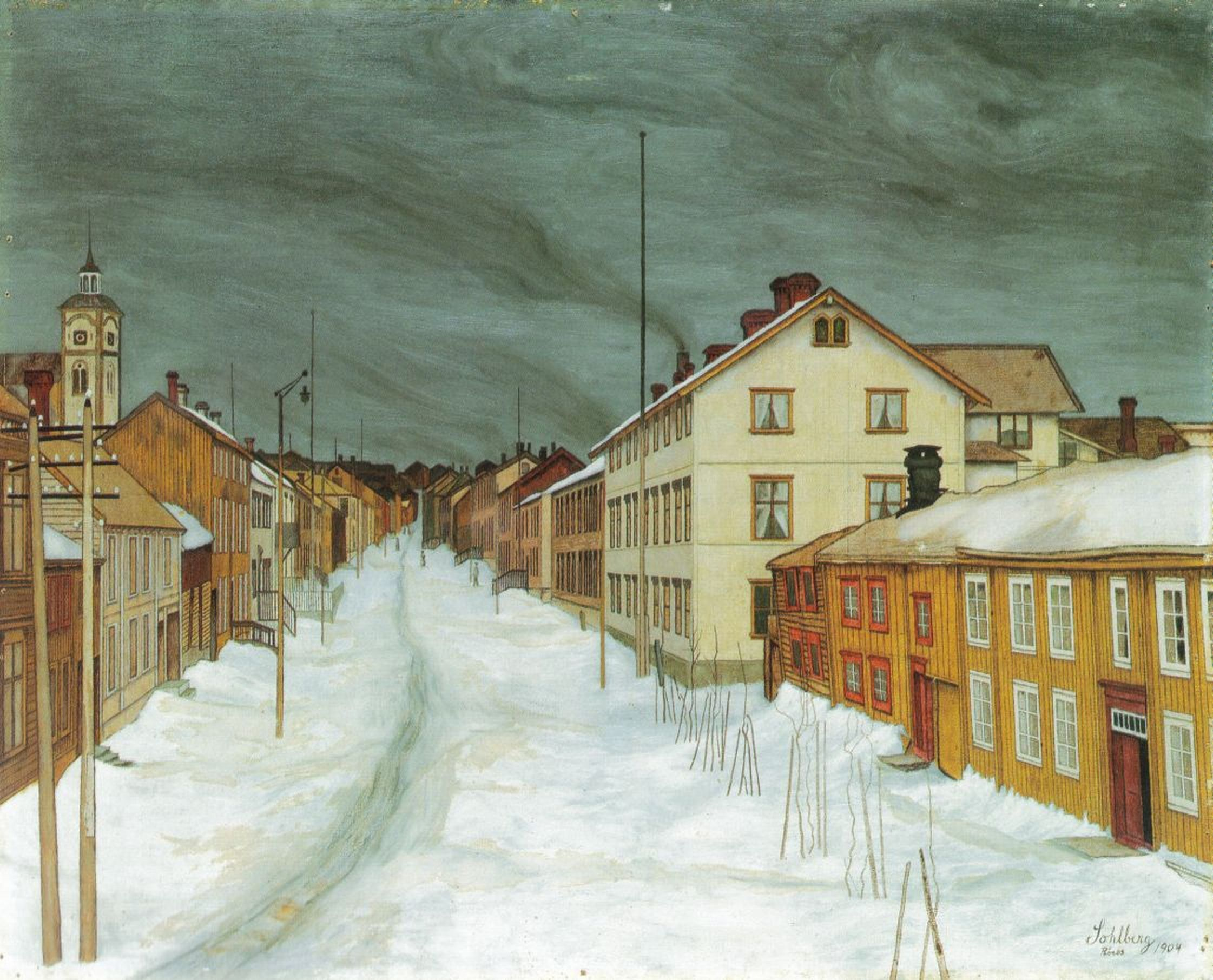
Storgaten Røros, painting by Harald Sohlberg from 1903 (titled Røros main street)

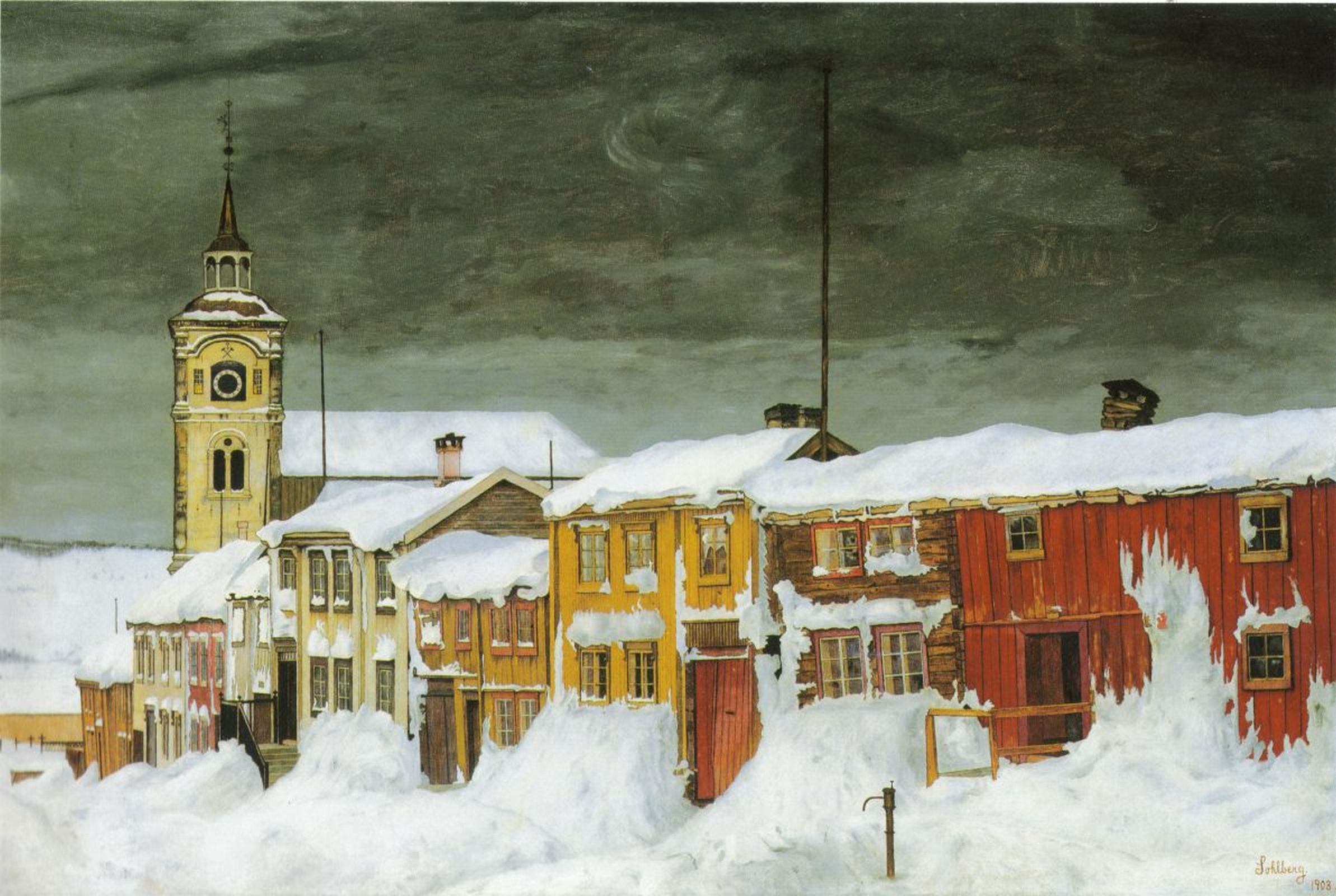
Efter snestorm, Lillegaten Røros, oil painting by Harald Sohlbeg from 1904 (titled After the snowstorm, Røros sidestreet)

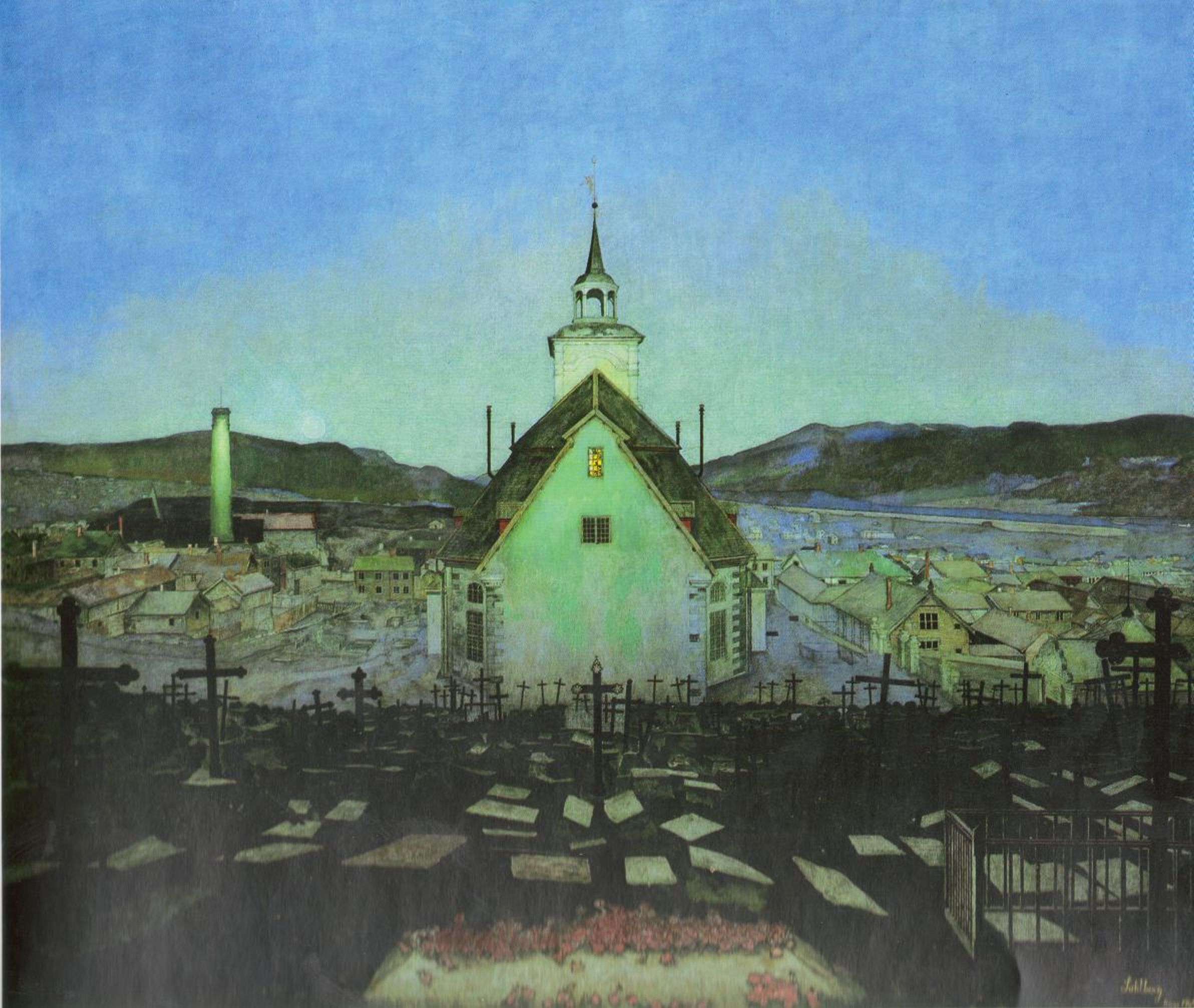
Natt painting by Harald Sohlberg from 1904 (titled Night)

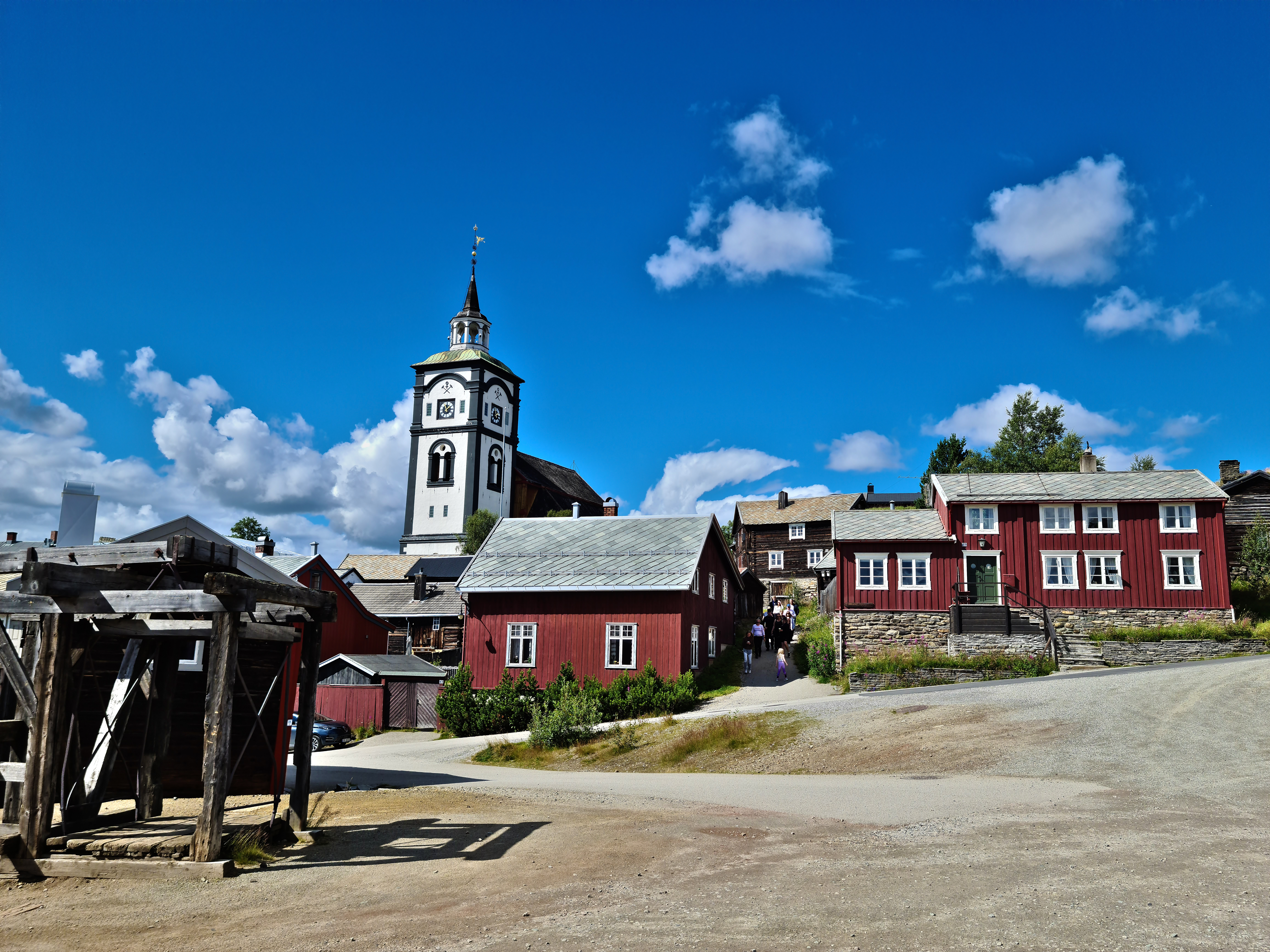
Malmplassen and Stangvekta

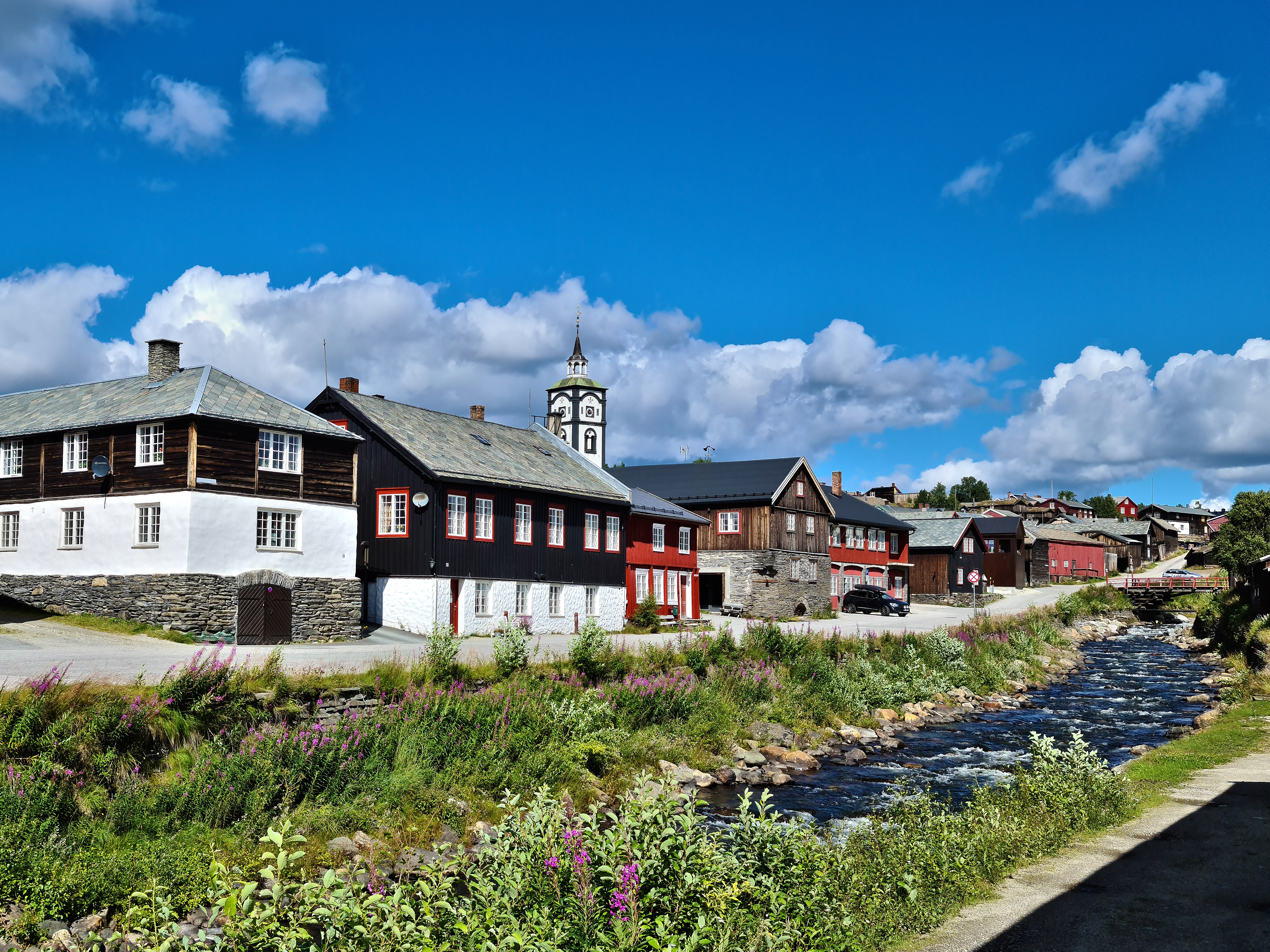
Town of Røros and river Hitterelva

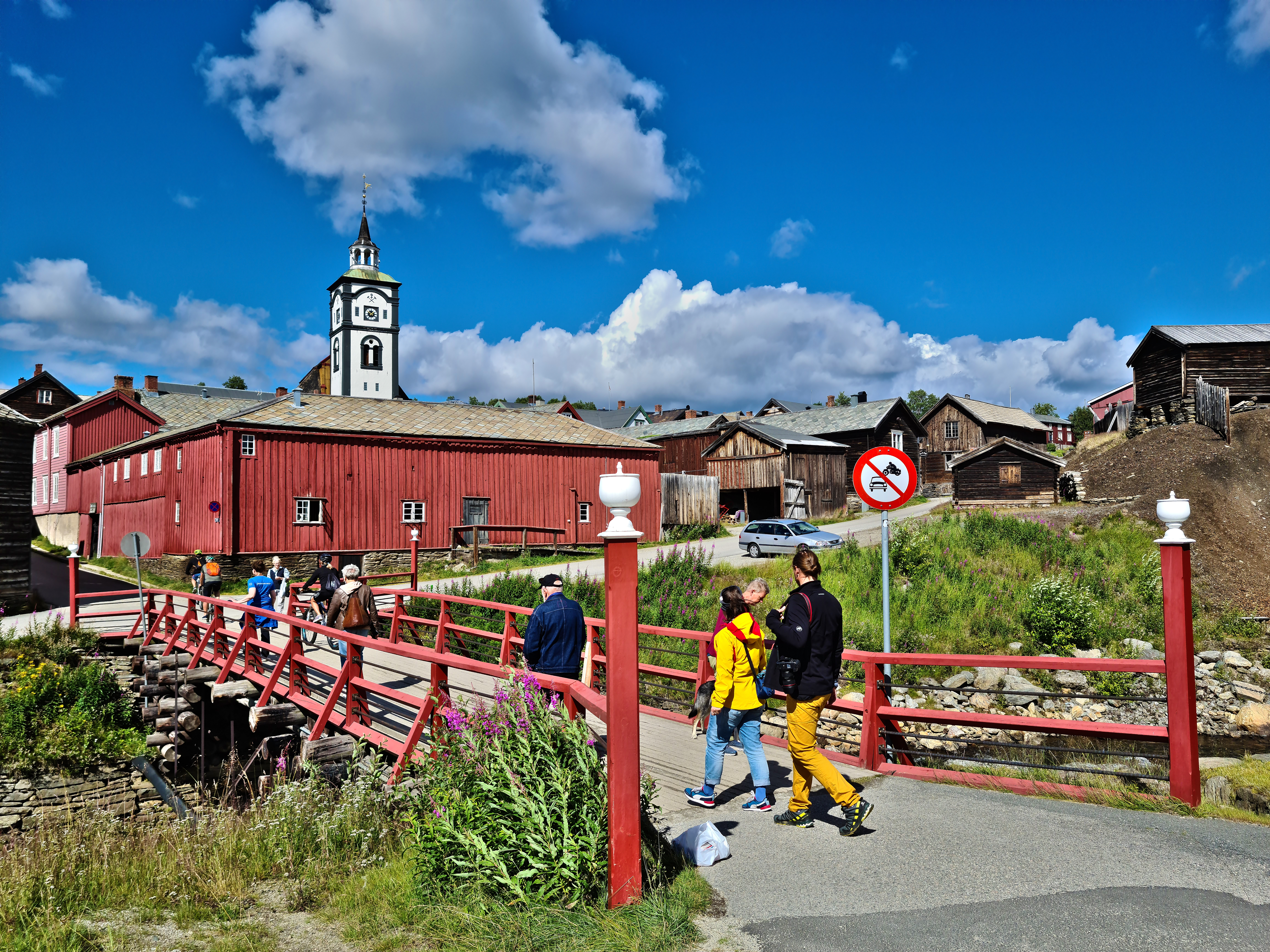
Town of Røros and Raubrua bridge

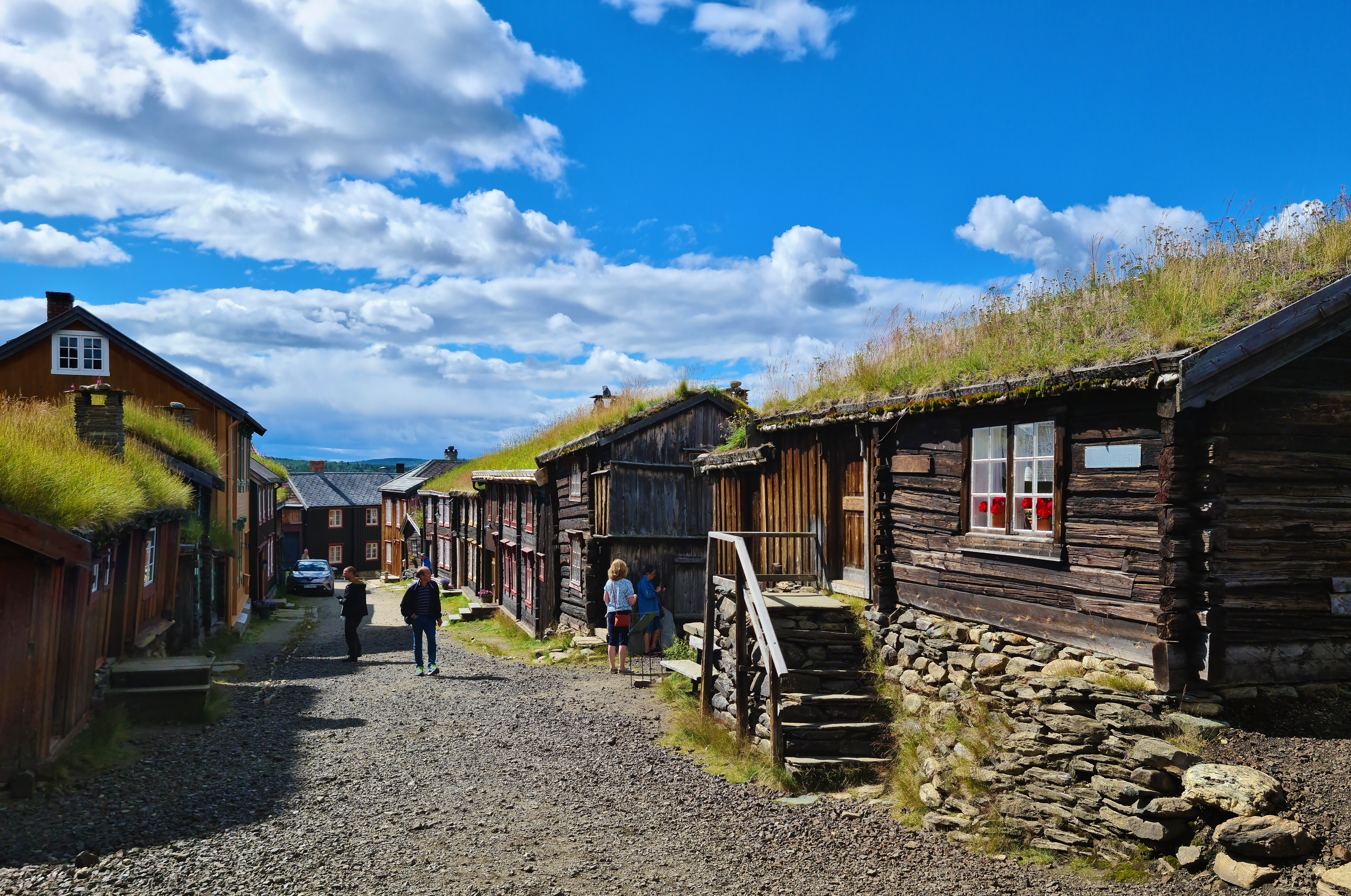
Røros and Sleggveien

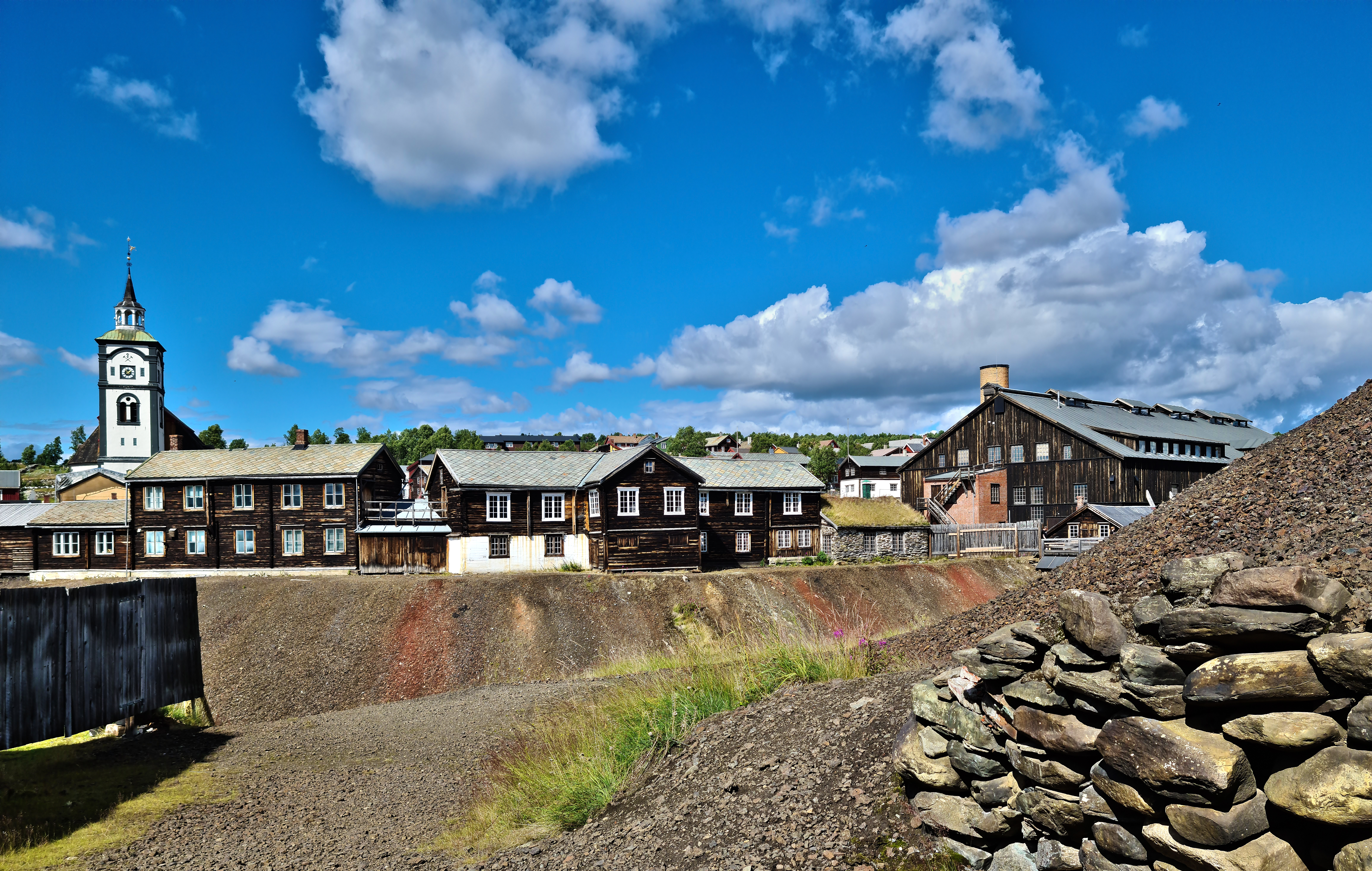
Røros and Bergstadens Ziir

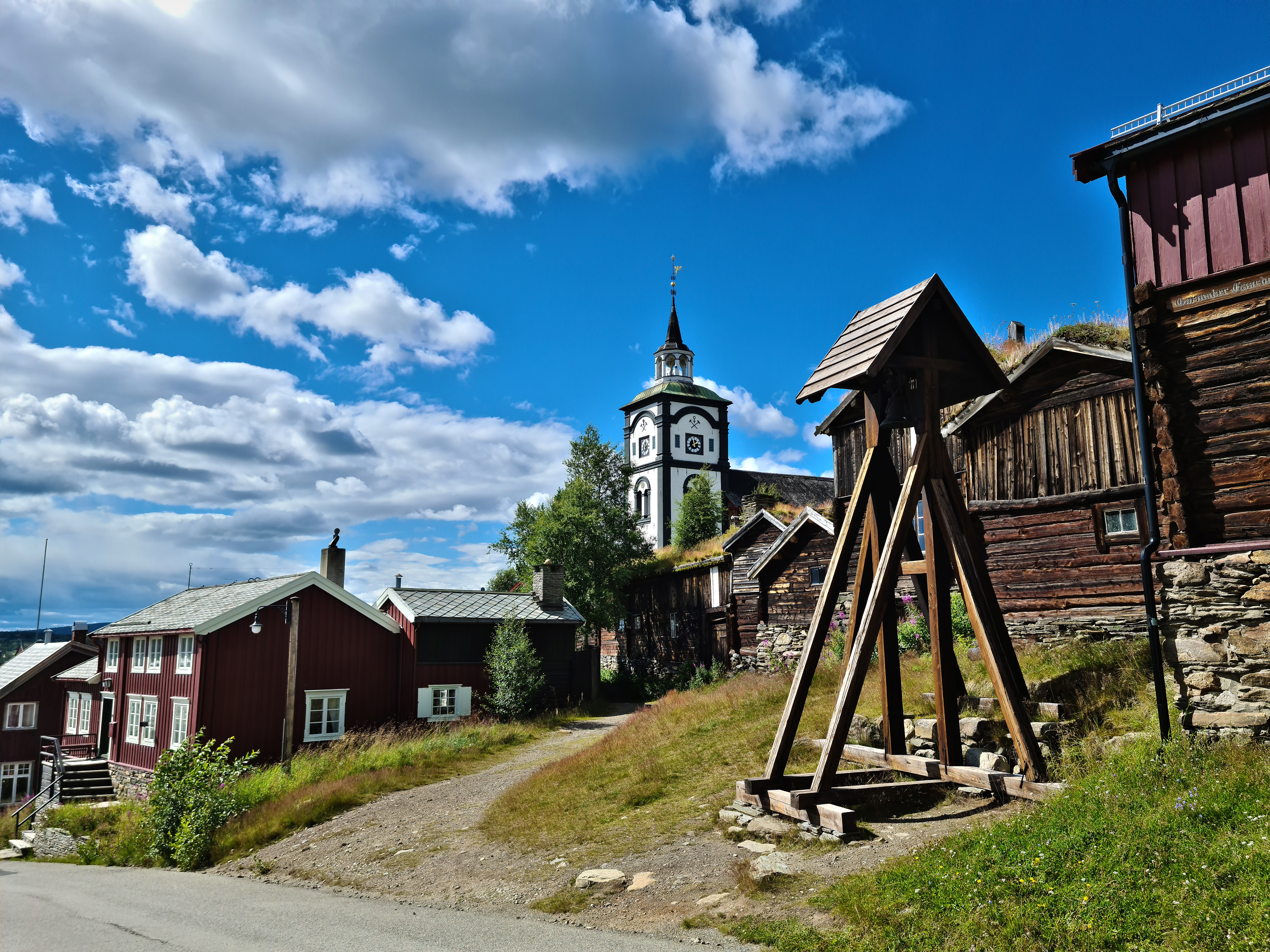
Røros - Hyttklokka and Bergstadens Ziir

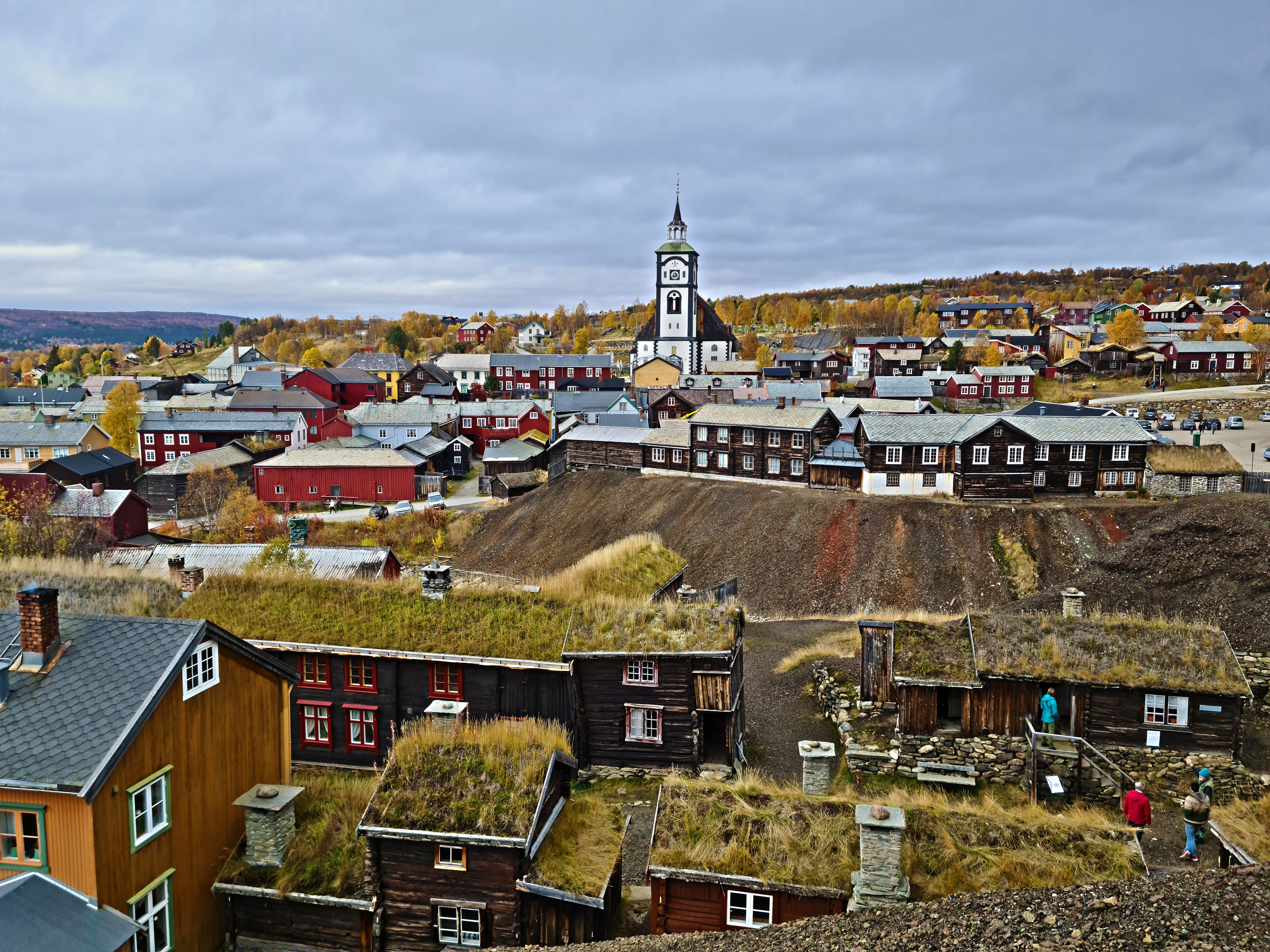
Røros in the autumn
