= Angel (disambiguation) =

Angels are a type of creature present in many mythologies and/or religions.

Angel or Angels may refer to:

== Places ==
- Angel (river), in North Rhine-Westphalia, Germany
- Angel, London, an area of London
  - Angel tube station
- Angel City, Florida, a populated place
- Angel Falls, a waterfall in Venezuela
- Angel Island (California), in San Francisco Bay
- Angel Mounds, Indiana, a Native American complex of earthworks and a National Historic Landmark
- Angeln or Angel (Danish), a peninsula in Germany
- Angels Camp, California, formerly called Angels
- Los Angeles, translation from Spanish (lit. 'The Angels')

=== Pubs and hotels ===
- The Angel Hotel, Abergavenny, Monmouthshire, Wales
- The Angel Inn, a public house in Andover, Hampshire, England
- Angels, Burnley, a former nightclub in Lancashire, England
- Angel Hotel, Bury St Edmunds, Suffolk, England
- Angel Hotel, Cardiff, Wales
- Angel Hotel, Chippenham, Wiltshire
- The Angel, Islington, a building in London, England from which the area is named
- The Angel Hotel, Monmouth, Monmouthshire, Wales
- Angel Inn, Stockport, a public house in Greater Manchester, England
- Angel and Royal, a hotel in Grantham, Lincolnshire, England

== People ==
=== Names ===
- Angel (given name)
- Angel (surname)

=== As a stage name or nickname ===
==== Music ====
- Angel (American singer) (born 1988), former member of No Secrets
- Angel (British musician) (born 1987), British hip hop singer-songwriter and rapper
- Ángel (Spanish singer), 1980s disco singer
- Angel Faith (born 1988), American singer and songwriter, stage name Angel

==== Professional wrestling ====
- Angel Medina (wrestler) (born 1972), known by the ring name "Angel"
- Angel Garza, shortened to Angel, Mexican professional wrestler (b. 1992)
- Jumping Bomb Angels, former female Japanese professional wrestling tag team
- The Blue Angel, stage name for Canadian professional wrestler Owen Hart (1965–1999)
- The French Angel (1903–1954), Russian-born French professional wrestler

==== Other fields ====
- The Angel (bushranger) (born c. 1858–1885), Australian bushranger
- Angel Melendez (Andre Melendez 1971–1996), a purported drug dealer murdered by his fellow Club Kids Michael Alig and Robert D. "Freeze" Riggs

== Art, entertainment, and media ==
=== Fictional entities ===
- Angel (The Amazing Digital Circus), a character from the animated series The Amazing Digital Circus
- Angel (Buffy the Vampire Slayer), a character from Buffy the Vampire Slayer and its spin-off Angel
- Angel (Dungeons & Dragons), a roleplaying game monster
- Angel (Evangelion), a race of divine beings in the Neon Genesis Evangelion series
- Ángel (The King of Fighters), a NESTS Team character
- Angel (Thomas Halloway), a golden age superhero in Marvel (Timely) Comics
- Angel (Lilo & Stitch), also known as Experiment 624, a character from the Lilo & Stitch franchise
- Angel O'Day, heroine of Angel and the Ape, a DC Comics title
- Angel Parrish, a Home and Away character
- Angel Salvadore, an X-Men character first appearing in 2001
- Warren Worthington III, also known as Angel or Archangel, a founding member of the X-Men
- Weeping Angels, a race of aliens from the sci-fi series Doctor Who

=== Films ===
- Angel (1937 film), an American comedy drama by Ernst Lubitsch and starring Marlene Dietrich
- The Angel (1958 film), a Chinese film by Li Han-hsiang
- Angel (1966 film), an animated short
- Angel (1982 Greek film), by Giorgos Katakouzinos
- Angel (1982 Irish film), an Irish drama by Neil Jordan
- The Angel (1982 film), a French film by Patrick Bokanowski
- Angel (1984 film), an American sexploitation film
- Angel (1987 film), a Hong Kong action film
- Angels (1990 film), a Spanish-Swiss drama by Jacob Berger
- The Angels (film), a 1991 Hong Kong film featuring Yukari Oshima
- Angel (2002 film), a pornographic film by David Aaron Clark
- Angel Rodriguez (film), an American TV film
- Angel (2007 film), a British drama by François Ozon
- Ángel (film), a 2007 Puerto Rican drama by Jacobo Morales
- The Angel (2007 film), a 2007 short film
- Angels (2007 film), a Filipino trilogy
- Angel (2009 film), a Norwegian drama
- Angel (2011 film), a Bollywood film
- Angels (2014 film), a Malayalam film
- Angel (2016 film), winner of several 2018 Magritte Awards
- Angel (2017 film), a Telugu film
- Un Ange, a Belgian film
- The Angel (2018 film), an Israeli-American spy thriller film
- El Angel (film), a 2018 Argentine film

=== Fine art ===
- Angel (Michelangelo), a sculpture in Italy
- Angels (statues), a group of busts in Slovenia
- El Ángel, a victory column in Mexico City
- The Angel (painting), 2013, by Michaël Borremans

=== Gaming ===
- Angels Online, massively multiplayer online role-playing game
- Wrestle Angels, wrestling-based video game series
  - Super Wrestle Angels
- Angel Roleplaying Game published 2003

=== Literature ===
- Angel (novel), by Elizabeth Taylor
- Angel, a novel by Cliff McNish
- Angel: A Maximum Ride Novel, a novel by James Patterson
- Angel Burn, the first novel of the Angel trilogy by L.A. Weatherly
- Angel series, a series of western novels by Frederick Nolan writing as Daniel Rockfern
- Angels (novel), by Denis Johnson
- Angels: God's Secret Agents, a book by Billy Graham
- "The Angel" (fairy tale), by Hans Christian Andersen
- "The Angel" (Songs of Experience), a poem by William Blake
- The Angel, the first novel in the Isabella Rose Series by Mark Dawson

=== Manga ===
- Angel (manga), a hentai manga series by U-Jin
- Angel, by Erica Sakurazawa

=== Music ===
==== Groups ====
- Angel (American band), 1975–present, an American rock band
- Angel (British band), 1973–1974
- Angel (Swedish band), an early 1990s pop group
- Angel, a 1989 band headed by Criss Angel
- The Angels (American group), a girl group
- The Angels (Australian band), a hard rock band

==== Albums ====
- Angel (Gina Jeffreys album), 2001
- Angel (Lizzy McAlpine album), 2026
- Angel (Amanda Perez album), or the title song, 2003
- Angel (Angel album), or the title song, 1975
- Angel: The Collection, a 2000 greatest-hits compilation by Angel
- Angel (Ohio Players album), or the title song, 1977
- The Angel, 2004, by Sol Invictus
- Angels (The 69 Eyes album), 2006
- Anges (album) (French: Angels), 2003, by Shunichi Miyamoto
- Angels E.P., a 1995 EP by Whiskeytown

==== Other uses in music ====
- Angel (musical), a 1978 Broadway musical
- Angel Records, an American record label

==== Songs ====
- "An Angel", a song by The Kelly Family
- "Angel" (A-ha song)
- "Angel" (Aerosmith song)
- "Angel" (Akon song)
- "Angel" (Amanda Perez song)
- "Angel" (Angela Winbush song)
- "Angel" (Aretha Franklin song)
- "Ángel" (Belinda Peregrín song)
- "Angel" (Chaka Khan song)
- "Angel" (Chiara song)
- "Angel" (Elvis Presley song), from the film Follow That Dream and later recorded by Cliff Richard
- "Angel" (Eurythmics song)
- "Angel" (Fifth Harmony song)
- "Angel" (Fleetwood Mac song)
- "Angel" (Gina Jeffreys song)
- "Angel" (Goldie song)
- "Angel" (Halle Bailey song)
- "Angel" (Helena Paparizou song)
- "Angel" (Jimi Hendrix song)
- "Angel" (JJ Cale song)
- "Angel" (Jon Secada song)
- "Angel" (Kate Voegele song)
- "Angel" (Kirsty MacColl song)
- "Angel" (Lionel Richie song)
- "Angel" (Lo-Tel song)
- "Angel" (Madonna song)
- "Angel" (Massive Attack song)
- "Angel" (Mika Newton song)
- "Angel" (Natasha Bedingfield song)
- "Angel" (Pharrell Williams song)
- "Angel" (PinkPantheress song)
- "Angel" (Sarah McLachlan song)
- "Angel" (Shaggy song)
- "Angel" (Taher Shah song)
- "Angel" (The Corrs song)
- "Angel" (Theory of a Deadman song)
- "Angel" (Tina Cousins song)
- "Angel" (Two Tricky song)
- "Angel" (Yoko Ono song)
- "Angel" (X Japan song)
- "Angel Pt. 1", by Kodak Black and NLE Choppa featuring Jimin, Jvke and Muni Long
- "Angels" (Amy Grant song)
- "Angels" (Chance the Rapper song)
- "Angels" (P-Money song)
- "Angels" (Robbie Williams song)
- "Angels" (The xx song)
- "Angels" (Within Temptation song)
- "Angels" (Michael W. Smith song)
- "The Angel" (song), by Bruce Springsteen
- "Angel" by 8mm, from Songs to Love and Die By
- "Angel" by Akcent
- "Angel" by Ala Boratyn, from Higher
- "Angel" by Amanda Perez, from Angel
- "Angel" by Amyl and the Sniffer, from Amyl and the Sniffers
- "Angel" by Anne Gadegaard, from Ini Mini Miny
- "Angel" by Anita Baker, from The Songstress
- "Angel" by Beverley Mitchell, from Beverley Mitchell
- "Angel" by Blue October, from Consent to Treatment
- "Angel" by Chancellor
- "Angel" by Cody Simpson, from Coast to Coast
- "Angel" by Dave Matthews Band, from Everyday
- "Angel" by David Gates, from Never Let Her Go
- "Angel" by Depeche Mode, from Delta Machine
- "Angel" by Devin Townsend Project, from Epicloud
- "Angel" by DMX, from …And Then There Was X
- "Angel" by Dru Hill, from Enter the Dru
- "Angel" by Erasure, from Erasure
- "Angel" by Everything but the Girl, from Love Not Money
- "Angel" by EXO, from Mama
- "Angel" by Fleetwood Mac, from Heroes Are Hard to Find
- "Angel" by Flipsyde, from We the People
- "Angel" by Brandon Flowers, from the album Thrasher
- "Angel" by Fra Lippo Lippi, from Light and Shade
- "Angel" by Golden Earring, from Face It
- "Angel" by Gothminster, from Gothic Electronic Anthems
- "Angel" by Gotthard, from Gotthard
- "Angel" by Happy Mondays, from Yes Please!
- "Angel" by Sault, from the EP 10
- "Angel" by Jack Johnson, from Sleep Through the Static
- "Angel" by Jay Chou, from Secret
- "Angel" by Judas Priest, from Angel of Retribution
- "Angel" by Kacey Musgraves, from Star-Crossed
- "Angel" by Kid Cudi, from Entergalactic
- "Angel" by Kings of Convenience, from Peace or Love
- "Angel" by Kodaline, from Politics of Living
- "Angel" by Leona Lewis, from Spirit
- "Angel" by Lilian Garcia, from the album ¡Quiero Vivir!
- "Angel" by Lionel Richie, from Renaissance
- "Angel" by Marty Friedman, from Scenes
- "Angel" by Misia, from Ascension
- "Angel" by Monica, from Miss Thang
- "Angel" by NCT 127, from the EP Limitless
- "Angel" by NewDad, from Madra
- "Angel" by Ne-Yo, from Because of You
- "Angel" by Nidji, from Breakthru'
- "Angel" by QueenAdreena, from Djin
- "Angel" by Riot, from Rock City
- "Angel" by Rod Stewart, from Never a Dull Moment
- "Angel" by Sarah Brightman, from Dreamchaser
- "Angel", by Sevdaliza, from ISON
- "Angel" by Stabbing Westward, from Stabbing Westward
- "Angel" by the Weeknd, from Beauty Behind the Madness
- "Angel (Come Walk with Me)" by Conception, from Flow
- "Angel (Footsteps)" by Jeff Beck, from Who Else!
- "Angel (What in the World Come Over Us)" by Atlanta Rhythm Section, from Third Annual Pipe Dream
- "Ángel" by Mecano, from Entre el cielo y el suelo
- "Angel 07" by Hubert Kah, from Angel 07
- "The Angel" by Buffy Sainte-Marie, from Illuminations
- "The Angel" by Heavenly, from Sign of the Winner
- "The Angel" by Ministry, from Twitch
- "The Angel" by Richard Wagner, from Wesendonck Lieder
- "Angels" by ASAP Rocky, from LONG.LIVE.A$AP
- "Angels" by Avenged Sevenfold, from The Stage
- "Angels" by Baboon, from We Sing and Play
- "Angels" by David Byrne, from his self-titled album
- "Angels" by Caroline's Spine, from Overlooked
- "Angels" by Chance the Rapper, from Coloring Book
- "Angels" by Crass, from The Feeding of the 5000
- "Angels" by Diddy, from Last Train to Paris
- "Angels" by Helloween, from Helloween
- "Angels" by Jessica Simpson, from In This Skin: Collector's Edition
- "Angels" by John Farnham, from Then Again
- "Angels" by Junkie XL, from Radio JXL: A Broadcast from the Computer Hell Cabin
- "Angels" by Khalid, from American Teen
- "Angels" by Limp Bizkit, from Gold Cobra
- "Angels" by Mayday Parade, from Monsters in the Closet
- "Angels" by Meghan Trainor, from Toy with Me
- "Angels" by MxPx, from Secret Weapon
- "Angels" by Nilüfer Yanya, from Miss Universe
- "Angels" by Owl City, from All Things Bright and Beautiful
- "Angels" by The Prom Kings, from the self-titled album
- "Angels" by The Tea Party, from The Interzone Mantras
- "Angels" by Threshold, from Clone
- "Angels" by Tori Amos, from Tales of a Librarian
- "Angels" by Warrant, from Born Again
- "Angels (Love is the Answer)" by Morandi, from N3XT

=== Television ===
==== Television series ====
- Angel (1960 TV series), an American sitcom
- Angel (1999 TV series), a 1999–2004 supernatural drama spin off from Buffy the Vampire Slayer
- Angel (2007 TV series), a South Korean series retitled Lobbyist
- Angel (2023 TV series), a 2023 BET+ series that is a prequel to Dutch (2021 film)
- Angels (TV series), a 1975–1983 British drama
- No Angels (TV series), British comedy-drama television series
- The Angel (game show)
- Touched by an Angel, an American TV series starting Della Reese

==== Television episodes ====
- "Angel" (7th Heaven)
- "Angel" (Buffy the Vampire Slayer episode)
- "Angel" (Casualty)
- "Angel" (Law & Order)
- "Angel" (So Weird)
- "Angel" (The Bill)
- "Angel" (The Red Green Show)
- "Angel" (The Rookies)
- "Angel" (Wainy Days)
- "Angel" (Walker, Texas Ranger)
- "Angel" (The Wonder Years)
- "Angels" (Breeze Block)
- "Angels" (Law & Order: Special Victims Unit)

== Brands and enterprises ==
=== In arts and media ===
- Angel (St. Paul's Churchyard), a historical bookseller in London
- Angel Studios, a video streaming service and media company
- Angel Recording Studios
- Rockstar San Diego, formerly Angel Studios, a video game developer
- Angel, a video game publisher (subsidiary of Bandai) whose games include Shatterhand
- Angels Costumes, a London-based company founded in 1840, which supplies costumes to the film, theatre and television industries, and to the general public

=== In other industries ===
- Angel Bakeries
- Angel Incorporated, a telecommunications company
- Angel, a line of perfumes by Thierry Mugler
- ANGEL Learning, a software company
- Angel Paintball Sports

== Sports ==
- Angel City FC, and American soccer team in Los Angeles
- Angels Toruń, a Polish American Football League team
- Angel Garza, Mexican professional wrestler
- BC Angels, Lingerie Football League team
- Los Angeles Angels, an American Major League Baseball team
- Los Angeles Angels (PCL), defunct American Minor League Baseball team
- Pesaro Angels, an American football team in Italy
- Petro Gazz Angels, a Philippines women's volleyball team

== Other uses ==
- Angel (coin)
- Angel (Manx coin)
- Angel (paintball gun)
- Angel investor, an early-stage investor
- Angel, an alternative version of the name of Angul (mythology), a legendary ancestor of the Angles and Danes
- Altitude (military aviation brevity code "Angels")
- Hells Angels, a motorcycle club
- Victoria's Secret Angels, the brand's most prominent contracted models

== See also ==
- Angelic (disambiguation)
- Angela (disambiguation)
- Angèle, a given name
- Angeles (disambiguation)
- Angell (disambiguation)
- Angelle, a given name and surname
- Angelo (disambiguation)
- Anjali (disambiguation)
- Angle
- Angel of Death (disambiguation)
- Angels of Death (disambiguation)
- Angel of Darkness (disambiguation)
- Charlie's Angels (disambiguation)
- Dark Angel (disambiguation)
- Death angel (disambiguation)
- Destroying angel (disambiguation)
- Earth Angel (disambiguation)
- El Ángel (disambiguation)
- Engel (disambiguation)
- Evil Angel (disambiguation)
- Fallen angel (disambiguation)
- Guardian angel (disambiguation)
- Teen Angel (disambiguation)
- 天使 (disambiguation)
