= Angele =

Angele or Angèle may also refer to:

- Angele (deme), a deme of ancient Attica, in Greece
- Angèle, a given name
- Angèle (singer) (born 1995), Belgian singer
- Angèle (film), a 1934 drama written, directed and produced by Marcel Pagnol

== See also ==
- Sainte-Angèle, Quebec (disambiguation)
- Angel (disambiguation)
