= Angell =

The surname Angell may refer to:

== In arts and media ==
=== Architects ===
- Edward Angell (1857–1923), American architect
- Frank W. Angell (1851–1943), American architect
- Samuel Angell (1800–1866), British architect and archaeologist
- Thomas Gravely Angell, architect, of Imrie and Angell
- Truman O. Angell (1810–1887), Church Architect for The Church of Jesus Christ of Latter-day Saints

=== Painters and sculptors ===
- Carleton W. Angell (1887–1962), American sculptor
- Helen Cordelia Angell (1847–1884), English watercolour painter
- Tony Angell (born 1940), American wildlife artist, environmental educator, and writer

=== Performers ===
- Barbara Angell (born 1935), Australian writer and actor
- Jeff Angell (born 1973), American musician
- Jones Angell (born 1979), play-by-play radio announcer
- Katie Angell, Australian trapeze artist and later a musical theatre actress
- Lisa Angell (born 1968), French singer
- Olav Angell (1932–2018), Norwegian writer and jazz musician

=== Writers ===
- Barbara Angell (born 1935), Australian writer and actor
- Ernest Angell (1889–1973), American lawyer and author
- Henrik Angell (1861–1922), Norwegian military officer, sportsman, and writer
- Marcia Angell (born 1939), American physician and author
- Norman Angell (1872–1967), British member of parliament, writer, and winner of the Nobel Peace Prize (1933)
- Olav Angell (1932–2018), Norwegian writer and jazz musician
- Roger Angell (1920–2022), fiction editor and regular contributor at The New Yorker
- Tony Angell (born 1940), American wildlife artist, environmental educator, and writer

=== In other arts ===
- Danita Angell, American model
- David Angell (1946–2001), American producer of sitcoms
- Peitor Angell, American composer, arranger, lyricist, and record producer

== In politics ==
- Albert Angell (1660–1705), Norwegian civil servant, landowner and businessman
- Alexis C. Angell (1857–1932), American federal judge
- David Angell (diplomat), Canadian diplomat
- Erik Must Angell (1744–1814), Norwegian jurist and politician
- Ernest Angell (1889–1973), American lawyer and author
- Homer D. Angell (1875–1968), Republican U.S. congressman from Oregon
- Norman Angell (1872–1967), British member of parliament, writer, and winner of the Nobel Peace Prize (1933)

== In science and academia ==
- Anna A. Angell (1844–1906), American physician
- Austen Angell (1933–2021), chemist
- Emerson C. Angell (1822–1903), American dentist
- Frank Angell (1857–1939), American psychologist
- George Thorndike Angell (1823–1909), founder of the American Humane Education Society, philanthropist, criminologist
- James Burrill Angell (1829–1916), president of the University of Michigan
- James Rowland Angell (1869–1949), psychologist, President of Yale
- Marcia Angell (born 1939), American physician and author
- Martin F. Angell (1878–1930), American football and baseball coach and physics and mathematics professor
- Robert Cooley Angell (1899–1984), American sociologist
- Wayne Angell (1930–2025), American economist and politician

== In sport ==
- Bjarne Angell (1888–1938), Norwegian tennis player
- Brett Angell (born 1968), English association football coach
- Darren Angell (born 1967), English football defender
- Henrik Angell (1861–1922), Norwegian military officer, sportsman, and writer
- Jim Angell (1883–1960), English footballer
- Les Angell (1922–2014), English cricketer
- Martin F. Angell (1878–1930), American football and baseball coach and physics and mathematics professor
- Nicholas Angell (born 1979), American professional ice hockey player
- Peter Angell (1932–1979), football defender
- Simon Angell (born 1970), New Zealand rugby league footballer
- Tommy Angell (1924–2022), American fencer

== In other fields ==
- George Thorndike Angell (1823–1909), founder of the American Humane Education Society, philanthropist, criminologist
- Israel Angell (1740–1832), soldier of the American Revolutionary War
- Katharine Cramer Angell (1890–1983), a founder of the Culinary Institute of America
- Kenneth Angell (1930–2016), American Roman Catholic bishop
- Lorentz Mortensen Angell (1626–1697), merchant and landowner in Norway
- Mary Ann Angell (1808–1882), wife of Latter Day Saint leader Brigham Young
- Thomas Angell (1618–1694), founding settler of Providence, Rhode Island

== Families ==
- Angell (family), in Norway

== See also ==
- Angell (disambiguation)
- Angel (disambiguation)
