= Cringe pop =

Genre of pop music

- Stylistic origins: Pop; cyberculture; cringe comedy
- Cultural origins: Early 2010s, United States

Other topics
- Comedy; Denpa

Cringe pop is a broad "genre" of pop music, which is written intentionally to be cringeworthy. It encompasses songs and music videos that are essentially awkward in nature. This awkwardness is intentionally produced for the purpose of gaining attention from people and going viral.

The element of how cringeworthy the music is determines the virality of the song.

== History ==
Cringe pop has spread due to the advancement of technology, essentially allowing anyone with a laptop to be able to produce a song and a music video. The rise of social media and streaming sites, especially YouTube have provided a platform for cringe-pop writers to publish their work and these platforms are fundamental for their existence.

While the origins of cringe pop are unknown, an Indian magazine credited Rebecca Black's song "Friday" as giving birth to the genre. The song, which was released in 2011, has over 149.6 million views and 3.8 million dislikes on YouTube as of January 2021.

Black was soon followed by Taher Shah, a Pakistani singer. His music video "Angel" went viral. His first music video, "Eye to Eye", was released in 2013, and "Angel" was released in 2016.

== Examples ==
Jacintha Morris, an Indian civil servant, released "Is Suzainn the Sinner" in 2016, which was labelled a cringe pop song. Morris herself denied that the song was intended to be cringe pop.

Other examples include "Aunty Ki Ghanti" by Indian rapper Omprakash Mishra released in 2015 and "PPAP (Pen-Pineapple-Apple-Pen)" by Japanese comedian Pikotaro, and the "Pokémon Go Song" by Czech child singer Misha/Mishovy Silenosti, both released in 2016.

Tony Kakkar, an Indian singer and composer, is often called out for cringe-worthy lyrics.

== Reception ==
Such songs are described as being "so bad, that you can't stop watching them".

== See also ==
- List of music considered the worst
- Trolling
- Novelty song
- Outsider music
- Cringe culture
