= Angèle =

Name list

Angèle is a given name. Notable people with the name include:

- Angèle (singer) (Angèle Van Laeken, born 1995), Belgian singer
- Angele Anang, Thai drag queen
- Angèle Dola Akofa Aguigah (born 1955), Togolese archaeologist
- Angèle Arsenault (1943–2014), Canadian-Acadian singer, songwriter and media host
- Angèle Bassolé-Ouédraogo (born 1967), Ivorian born Canadian poet and journalist
- Angèle Dubeau (born 1962), Canadian Québécoise violinist
- Angèle Etoundi Essamba (born 1962), Cameroonian photographer
- Angèle Pompéi (1898–1990), French Corsican scientist who worked at the Curie laboratory from 1929
- Angèle Rawiri (1954–2010), Gabonese novelist
- Angéle de la Barthe (1230–1275), prosperous woman of Toulouse, France; tried for witchcraft and condemned to death by the Inquisition

== See also ==
- Angel (given name)
- Angelle
