= Angels of Death =

Angels of Death may refer to:

- Angels of Death (Hawkwind album), 1986
- Angels of Death (Jennifer Castle album), 2018
- Angels of Death (Representativz album), 1999
- Angels of Death (video game), a Japanese horror adventure game
- Lainz Angels of Death, four Austrian nurses who confessed to 49 murders between 1983 and 1989
- Engelen des doods or Angels of Death, a 1998 documentary by Leo de Boer
- The Angels of Death MC, a fictional biker gang in Grand Theft Auto IV: The Lost and Damned

== See also ==
- Angel of Death (disambiguation)
- Death angel (disambiguation)
