= Exterminating Angel =

Extermination Angel, The Exterminating Angel or Exterminating Angels may refer to:

- The Exterminating Angel, a 1962 Mexican film by Luis Buñuel
- The Exterminating Angel (opera), a 2015 opera by Thomas Adès based on the 1962 film
- The Exterminating Angels, a 2006 French film by Jean-Claude Brisseau
- Society of the Exterminating Angel, a 19th-century Catholic group, established to kill Spanish liberals
- "Exterminating Angel", a song and single by The Creatures from the album Anima Animus
- "The Exterminating Angel", a 1995 episode of the British comedy series One Foot in the Grave
- A nickname for 16th century French pirate Jacques de Sores

== See also ==
- Angel of Death (disambiguation)
- Destroying angel (disambiguation)
