= Angeles =

Angeles means "angels" in Spanish. It may also refer to:

== Places ==
- Los Angeles, the largest city in California and the Western US
- Angeles City, a highly urbanized city in Central Luzon, Philippines
- Angeles National Forest, a national forest on the outskirts of Los Angeles
  - Angeles Crest Highway, a road in said forest
- Angeles River, Puerto Rico
- Port Angeles, a city in the US State of Washington
- Mount Angeles, Washington

== Music ==
- Angeles (band), an American rock band
- "Angeles", a 1991 song by Enya from her album Shepherd Moons
- "Angeles", a 1993 song by Engelbert Humperdinck from his album Yours: Quiereme Mucho
- "Angeles", a 1997 song by Elliott Smith from his album Either/Or
- Angeles Records, an American hip hop label

== Other uses ==
- Angeles (name), including a list of people with the name
- Ángeles S.A., a 2007 Spanish film

== See also ==
- Angel (disambiguation)
- Los Angeles (disambiguation)
