= Avenging Angel =

Avenging Angel may refer to:

- Avenging Angel (1985 film), a 1985 film starring Betsy Russell
- Avenging Angel (2007 film), a 2007 TV film starring Kevin Sorbo
- Avenging Angel (album), a 2011 album by Craig Taborn
- "Avenging Angels" (song), a 1997 single by Space
- The Avenging Angel, a 1995 TV movie directed by Craig R. Baxley
- Saboteur II: Avenging Angel, a 1987 computer game for the ZX Spectrum
- Avenging Angel, a 1990 novel by Kwame Anthony Appiah
- Avenging Angel, a member of the Mormon Danite
- An early moniker for Warren Worthington III, an antihero in the Marvel Comics universe

== See also ==
- Angel of Vengeance (disambiguation)
- Angel's Revenge (disambiguation)
- Destroying angel (disambiguation)
- "Revenging Angel" (TV episode), a 2001 season 3 number 16 episode 60 of Farscape
- Revenging Angels (novel), a novel in the Morgan Kane series
