= Tenshi =

Tenshi is another term for a tennin, a spiritual being in Japanese Buddhism. It may also refer to:

- Tenshi, a title of the emperor of Japan
- Tenshi, a 2006 Japanese film based on a manga series Angel Nest
- "Tenshi", a song by Kokia from the 2002 album Trip Trip
- Tenshi Hinanai, a fictional character in Scarlet Weather Rhapsody from the video game series Touhou Project
- Kanade Tachibana, or Tenshi, a fictional character in the anime television series Angel Beats!

== See also ==
- Tianzi (disambiguation)
- 天使 (disambiguation)
