= Lilian Garcia =

American ring announcer and singer (born 1966)

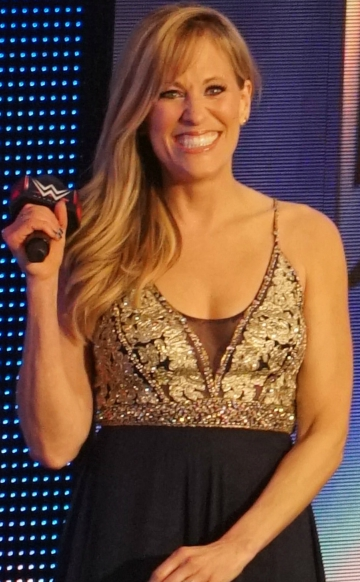
- Garcia in 2018

Personal information
- Born: Lilián Annette Garcia; August 19, 1966 (age 60) Panama Canal Zone, U.S.
- Education: University of South Carolina
- Spouse: Patrick Ellrich (m. 2026)
- Website: liliangarcia.com

Professional wrestling career
- Ring name: Lilian Garcia
- Billed height: 5 ft 5 in (1.65 m)
- Billed weight: 110 lb (50 kg)
- Billed from: New York City
- Debut: August 23, 1999
- Musical career
- Genres: Pop, dance, rock
- Years active: 2007–present

YouTube information
- Channel: Lilian Garcia
- Years active: 2007–present
- Genre: Professional wrestling
- Subscribers: 41 thousand
- Views: 3 million

Lilián Annette Garcia (born August 19, 1966) is an American ring announcer, singer and podcaster. She is signed to WWE as a ring announcer for Saturday Night’s Main Event and other company projects.

== Early life and career ==
Garcia was born on August 19, 1966, in the Panama Canal Zone. At three months old, she moved to Spain. She then spent eight years of her life in Spain due to her Puerto Rican father's employment as a Lt. Colonel with the American Embassy, and was educated on an American military base, leading her to describe herself as a "military brat". She is fluent in English and Spanish.

Upon returning to the United States, Garcia graduated from Irmo High School in Columbia, South Carolina. She went on to attend the University of South Carolina, graduating cum laude.

Garcia was a top-ten finalist in the Miss South Carolina beauty pageant. Garcia was also one-half of a popular morning show on radio station WYYS, YES 97 in Columbia, South Carolina, with Chuck Finley in the early '90s and later had her own drive time show. She was a VJ in Atlanta, Georgia for WTLK-TV. She also served as karaoke host at the Nitelites nightclub in the Embassy Suites Hotel in Columbia, South Carolina.

== Singing career ==
Garcia began singing when she was a child in Madrid, Spain. She participated in singing contests with her sister starting when she was five years old. In her early teens, she sang with a band at clubs around Columbia, South Carolina. Garcia's mother chaperoned so she could sing. She appeared in the 1990 film Modern Love as a singer.

In addition to her announcing duties with WWE, Garcia sang the national anthem of the United States before most Monday Night Raw shows from February 14, 2000, until her departure on August 1, 2016. She sang "America the Beautiful" at WrestleMania 2000, WrestleMania 21 and WrestleMania XXVIII, joining a list of recording artists that includes Aretha Franklin, Ray Charles, Reba McEntire, Gladys Knight and Willie Nelson. With her performance at WrestleMania XXVIII, she surpassed Franklin for most musical performances at WrestleMania. Garcia now holds the record for most musical performances at WrestleMania with three.

After joining WWE, Garcia became a fixture in professional sports with performances for the National Football League, the National Basketball Association, the National Hockey League and Major League Baseball. She also performed at the 1996 Summer Olympics, the Macy's Thanksgiving Day Parade, Live with Regis and Kathie Lee, Dancing with the Stars and as an opening act for James Brown.

García's first single, "Shout", debuted at No. 69 on the Billboard Hot 100 in October 2002. On her reaction to the news, Garcia said in 2007, "When my single came out years ago, and it was just a single, I remember the very first week it charted No. 69, and I was screaming as I grabbed Billboard, running down the streets of New York City, holding it up and screaming, 'I made Billboard! I made Billboard!' I'm dreaming for that moment again."

Garcia recorded Torrie Wilson's entrance theme, "Need A Little Time", for WWE Anthology, a compilation album WWE released in November 2002. She co-wrote "You Just Don't Know Me At All" with producers Doug Kistner and Anthony Krizan, which WWE released in January 2004 on the WWE Originals album and became her entrance theme.

Garcia began work on a solo album in 2005 with Grammy award-winning record producers George Noriega and Tim Mitchell, who worked with multi-platinum artists such as Shakira, Ricky Martin and Jennifer Lopez. Her album ¡Quiero Vivir! (Spanish for "I Want to Live!") got released on October 9, 2007, via Universal Music Latino. Garcia co-wrote 11 songs on the album, including three with Jon Secada, who she duets ,with on "Adonde". The album features 10 Spanish language tracks, and two English translations; "Under in Love" ("Desenamorada") and "Where Did Love Go?" ("Adonde"). The title track, "¡Quiero Vivir!", became her entrance theme.

After leaving WWE in August 2016, Garcia began work on a follow-up album. She reunited with Noriega and Mitchell to record the first song in Miami, Florida in February 2011. Garcia also recorded tracks with Grammy-nominated producer Oh, Hush!. On August 17, 2012, Garcia released an EP titled My Time. The EP features six English tracks: "U Drive Me Loca", "Ur Girl (til the end of the world)", "Fix You", "Over & Over", "Tell Me", and "My Time." To promote the release of My Time, Garcia made her music video debut in December 2011 with "U Drive Me Loca." The second song off the album, "Ur Girl ('Til the End of the World)", was her entrance theme during her return to WWE. She released a music video for the track in March 2012. In January 2013, Garcia released a music video for "Over & Over".

Garcia appeared at the 53rd annual Grammy Awards on February 13, 2011, at the Staples Center in Los Angeles, California. Her appearance on the red carpet got shown the following night on Jimmy Kimmel Live!.

On May 27, 2014, Garcia announced that she and her band, The Fuse, would be performing at Club Madrid in the Sunset Station Casino in Henderson, Nevada, near Las Vegas. She performed her first show on June 14, 2014.

== Announcing career ==
=== World Wrestling Federation/Entertainment (1999–2010) ===
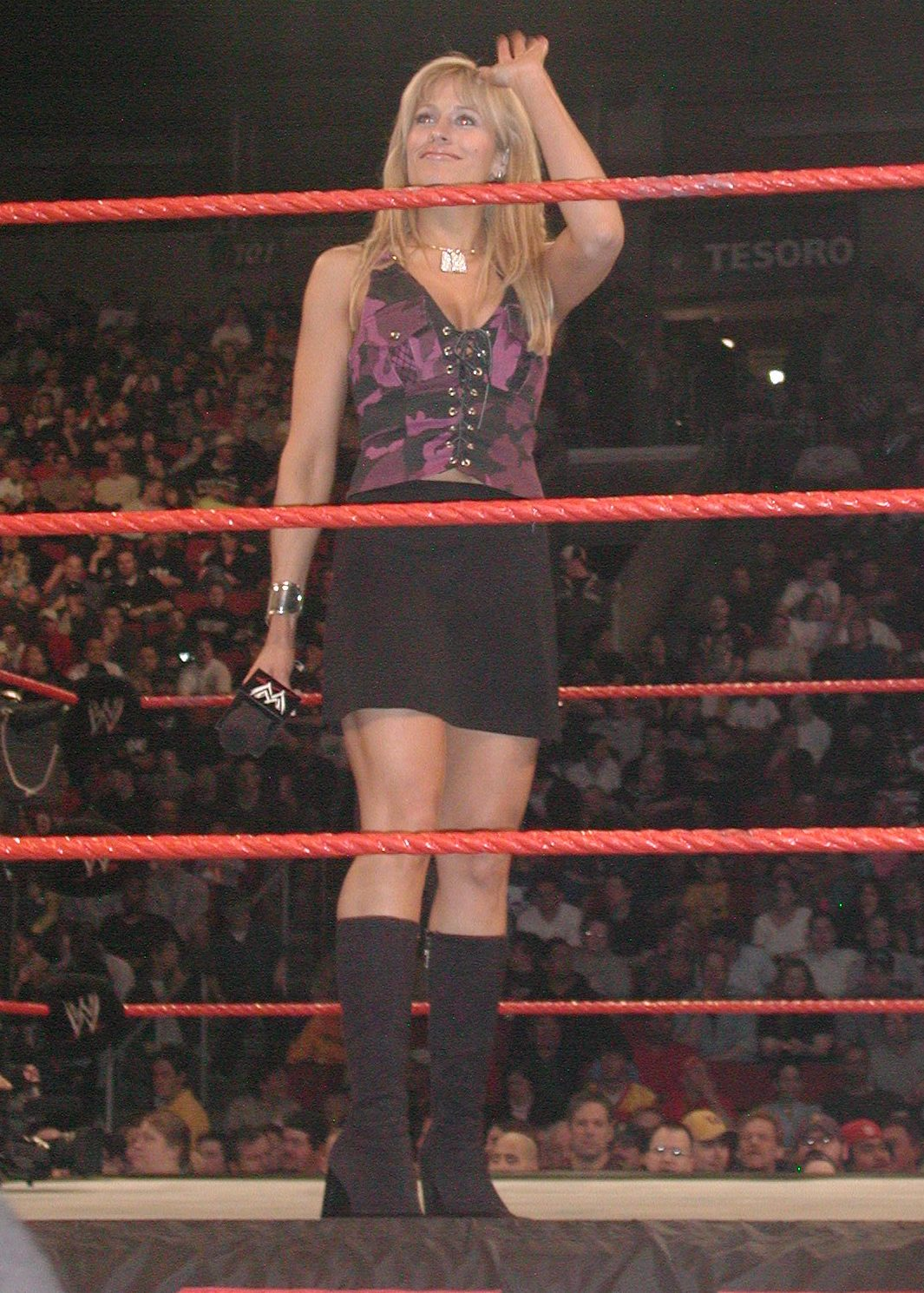
Garcia in 2003

In 1999, Garcia was hired by World Wrestling Federation (WWF) as a ring announcer. She made her debut on the August 23, 1999, episode of Raw is War in Ames, Iowa. She was involved in her first angle on the September 13 episode of Raw is War, when Jeff Jarrett applied a figure four leglock to her after she angered him by announcing his loss by disqualification to Luna Vachon.

Garcia's second angle occurred on the December 13, 1999, episode of Raw. She introduced Miss Kitty for a Women's Championship chocolate pudding pool match. After Garcia announced her, Miss Kitty grabbed the mic and informed Garcia that she was now to be known as "The Kat". Her opponent, Tori, came out for their match and right after the two women began, X-Pac came poolside in a skin diving suit complete with snorkel, flippers, and goggles. As he was adjusting his goggles Tori jumped on his back causing both of them to fall into the pool with X-Pac landing up on top of Tori, giving Miss Kitty an easy pinfall. Garcia announced the winner as "Miss Kitty", which infuriated The Kat, who threw Garcia into the pool of pudding.

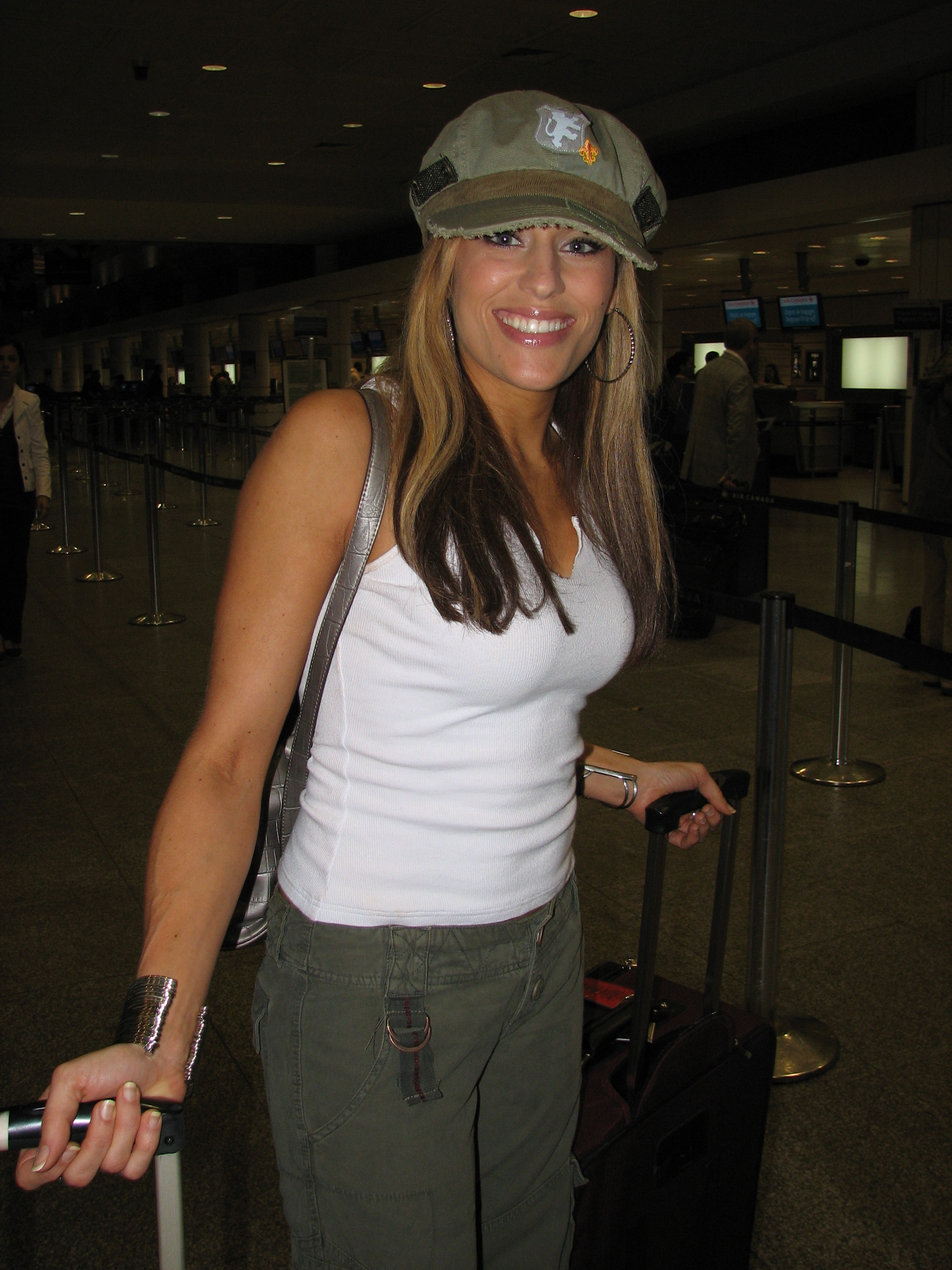
Garcia in 2006

Garcia sang the national anthem of the United States for the first time on February 11, 2000, at a house show in Denver, Colorado. After hearing that she did a great job, Chairman and CEO Vince McMahon had her sing the anthem before Raw went on the air on February 14, 2000, in San Jose, California. Impressed with her performance, McMahon then had Garcia sing the anthem every week before Raw. Her first televised performance aired on April 2, 2000, where she opened WrestleMania 2000 in Anaheim, California. Following the September 11 attacks, Garcia sang "The Star-Spangled Banner" on the September 13, 2001, episode of SmackDown!. In the course of the evening, Garcia commented on the attacks, saying "Well, to say the least, this has been a real roller coaster of a week. And especially because I live in New York City. I have loved ones there, and I'm just very fortunate and very glad that a specific one didn't get to go to his meeting at 8:30 in the morning that he was supposed to be at the Twin Towers, and so I thank God for that, and I still don't know about a lot of my friends. I have, we'll be finding out, I guess, little by little. I pray for everybody there..."

In August 2002, García briefly feuded with rival announcer Howard Finkel after Finkel left her to be decimated by 3-Minute Warning, culminating in an "evening gown versus tuxedo match" that Garcia won with the assistance of Stacy Keibler and Trish Stratus. During the Memorial Day episode of Raw on May 26, 2003, Garcia was singing "America the Beautiful" to the crowd when she was interrupted by La Résistance members Sylvain Grenier and René Duprée as they insulted America saying they should've been more like the French and they mocked the American people by calling them "fat and ugly". Just then, Garcia's friend, co-general manager Stone Cold Steve Austin came down to the ring and tossed Grenier out of the ring and delivered a Stunner to Duprée. After the two Frenchmen walked out of the ring, Austin sang "America the Beautiful" with Garcia and the two celebrated with a beer bash. During the November 24 episode of Raw, Garcia announced Trish Stratus as the winner of a bra and panties match over Jackie Gayda. Infuriated, Gayda stripped Garcia down to her black bra.

In June 2005, García began an on-screen romance with wrestler Viscera. The angle saw García propose to Viscera, stating that she wanted to marry him during the Vengeance pay-per-view on June 26. The angle ended at Vengeance, when Viscera rejected Garcia in favor of The Godfather's Hos. The angle was briefly resurrected eleven months later when Viscera proposed to Garcia on the May 22, 2006, episode of Raw, but was interrupted by Umaga and his manager Armando Estrada before receiving an answer. Garcia took part in her first major Diva publication in 2005 with the release of the Divas 2005 swimsuit magazine and related DVD Viva Las Divas of the WWE.

On the June 5, 2006, episode of Raw, Garcia (legitimately) suffered a sprained wrist when wrestler Charlie Haas inadvertently knocked her to the ground as she stood on the ring apron. One week later, the accident was metamorphosed into a storyline, with Haas incurring the wrath of Viscera. The storyline ended on the July 10, 2006, episode of Raw, when Viscera accidentally performed a Samoan drop on Garcia while confronting Haas. Garcia was removed from television for several weeks to sell the Samoan drop.

Garcia took part in her second major Diva publication in 2007 with the release of WWE Divas Do San Antonio, in honor of the WWE being in San Antonio for the Royal Rumble. On the April 2, 2007, episode of Raw, Garcia was humiliated in the ring when her blue satin frilled skirt was torn off by Bobby Lashley, revealing her black lycra bikini panties after Vince McMahon attempted to hide his newly shaven bald head under her skirt. The incident resulted in a large surge in searches for Garcia on the Internet, with searches for "Lilian Garcia" jumping 301% and becoming the fourth most searched-for term on the search engine Yahoo!. She returned to announcing on the July 2, 2007, episode of Raw after taking time off to recover from a skiing injury in which she tore the ACL in her right knee. She was not fully recovered as was evident from her only announcing the first two matches from the ring and the rest from the floor. On the August 6, 2007, episode of Raw, Garcia announced her new album entitled ¡Quiero Vivir!. Garcia then started a feud with Jillian Hall, who claimed to be a better singer than he. The next week, she competed in WWE Idol, a parody of American Idol, in which she sang "New York, New York" by Frank Sinatra before being interrupted by Santino Marella. In addition to announcing on Raw and pay-per-view matches, Garcia also announced on Superstars, making her first appearance on April 23, 2009. During the last week of August 2009, Garcia celebrated ten years with WWE, becoming the organization's first and only "Decade Diva".

On the September 21, 2009, episode of Raw from Little Rock, Arkansas, Jerry Lawler announced to the live audience that it was Garcia's final night with WWE. Garcia then made an emotional speech in the ring, thanking the fans and all of her colleagues. The final match she announced live featured Randy Orton, Chris Jericho, and Big Show taking on the team of John Cena, Montel Vontavious Porter, and Mark Henry, although a match between Primo and Chris Masters was taped earlier that evening and aired three days later on WWE Superstars, marking her final television appearance. Garcia made a special appearance before the Madison Square Garden audience on November 16, 2009, singing "The Star-Spangled Banner" prior to the evening's Raw telecast. Garcia filled in for Raw ring announcer Justin Roberts on April 19, 2010, due to being stranded in Europe with other WWE Superstars and crew as a result of the Eyjafjallajökull volcanic eruption. Her appearance caused a surge in online searches, resulting in the term "Lilian Garcia" becoming the eighth most searched-for term on Google that evening and into the next day.

=== Return to WWE (2011–2019) ===
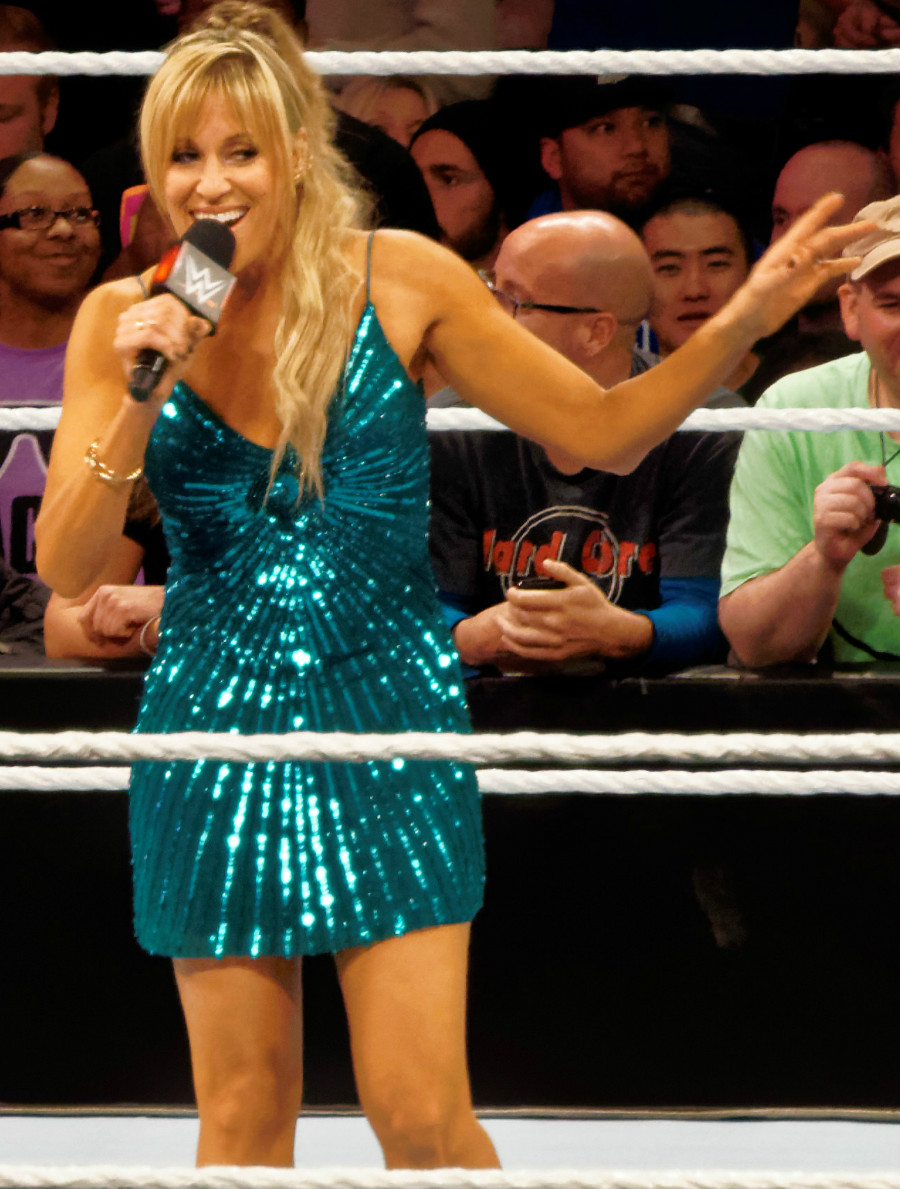
Garcia in 2015

On December 5, 2011, WWE announced that Garcia would be returning to ring announcing full-time, appearing on SmackDown. She returned at the December 6 tapings of the show. She also served as the ring announcer for Main Event and pay-per-views. Garcia suffered accidents prior to SmackDown tapings in 2012. While heading to the ring prior to the March 13 taping in Columbus, Ohio, the strap on her left shoe broke. One month later, during the April 17 taping in London, England, she tripped over pyrotechnic equipment on the top of the stage and fell down on the ramp, landing on her knees. On the April 19, 2013, episode of SmackDown, Garcia was instructed dance steps by Fandango and insulted.

On the June 6, 2014, episode of SmackDown, she was involved in a confrontation with Alicia Fox after Fox lost a match to Natalya. On October 20, 2014, after Justin Roberts was released from WWE, Garcia returned as the full-time ring announcer for Raw. Lilian returned from knee surgery on May 31 at Elimination Chamber. On August 1, 2016, Garcia announced her departure from WWE. Garcia made a one-night return on December 14, 2016, at WWE Tribute to the Troops where she sang the American national anthem.

She made another special appearance before the Talking Stick Resort Arena audience in Phoenix, Arizona, on July 4, 2017, singing "The Star-Spangled Banner" prior to the evening's SmackDown Live telecast. She was also the ring announcer for the finals of the Mae Young Classic on September 12, 2017.

On January 22, 2018, in the Raw 25 Years special episode, Garcia was honored as part of a segment involving women considered legends that contributed to the company's success, including the Bella Twins, Maryse, Kelly Kelly, Torrie Wilson, Michelle McCool, Terri Runnels, Maria Kanellis and the Hall of Famers Jacqueline and Trish Stratus. She announced the first-ever WrestleMania Women's Battle Royal in WrestleMania 34's pre-show on April 8, 2018. On October 28, 2018, she announced the first-ever WWE Women's Pay Per View WWE Evolution. On the July 22, 2019, episode of Raw, Garcia made a special appearance at the Raw Reunion.

=== Professional Fighters League (2019–2023) ===
Around the end of May 2019, Garcia announced on her Chasing Glory podcast that she had joined the mixed martial arts organization, the Professional Fighters League (PFL), as a ring announcer.

In an interview with Chris Van Vliet, Garcia revealed that late in 2023 she found she was unable to use her announcing voice and due to this, PFL informed her that they would not be renewing her contract for the 2024 PFL season. It was later discovered that her voice was being affected due to a severe gas leak that was in her old family home in South Carolina. Once she had moved from that home to her current residence in Atlanta, her singing and announcing voice recovered and returned, which led to her current return to part-time announcing with WWE.

=== Second return to WWE (2024–present) ===
On May 13, 2024, Garcia made a one-night return on Raw where she was asked by ring announcer Samantha Irvin to help introduce a King of the Ring Quarterfinal tournament match between Gunther and Kofi Kingston. On the October 21, 2024, episode of Raw, Garcia would serve as announcer for the entire night in place of Irvin, who had announced her departure from WWE earlier that day. It was later announced that she had re-signed with the company on a full-time basis.

From January 3, to March 14, 2025, Garcia served as the SmackDown ring announcer once again, switching roles with Alicia Taylor. After the March 14 episode of SmackDown, she announced it was her last as full-time announcer of the brand, though would continue working with WWE as the ring announcer for Saturday Night's Main Event and other roles within the company.

On June 7, 2025, Garcia sang the American National Anthem that opened the WWE and Lucha Libre Asistencia Asesoría y Administración (AAA) event Worlds Collide and was also the ring announcer.

On the September 22 and October 20, 2025, episodes of Raw, Garcia replaced Alicia Taylor as ring announcer.

On July 14, 2026, Garcia returned as the ring announcer for NXT.

== Other media ==
=== Television ===
On March 31, 2017, Garcia appeared on CBS daytime game show The Price Is Right as a contestant during the show's College Rivals special (taped February 12, 2017, aired on March 31, 2017) representing her alma mater University of South Carolina. She won a trip to London along with some fashion accessories.

Garcia appears as a wrestling ring announcer in NBC comedy series A.P. Bio, in an episode entitled "Aces Wild".

=== Podcasting ===
After leaving WWE, Garcia began hosting two podcasts, Making Their Way to the Ring and the Spanish-language Luchando Con Lilian Garcia, distributed by Maria Menounos' AfterBuzz TV network. On July 31, 2017, Garcia debuted her new podcast Chasing Glory with Lilian Garcia on PodcastOne.

== Personal life ==
Garcia is a devout Christian. Garcia credits wrestler Molly Holly with reconnecting her with God.

She was previously married, but had it annulled through the Catholic Church. In November 2025, Garcia announced her engagement to her fiancée, but did not disclose his identity, although she stated that he was a former professional wrestler. In April 2026, Garcia married Patrick Ellrich, who wrestled for NWA Anarchy under the ring name Hayden Young, and was a former tag team partner of Xavier Woods.

Garcia maintains a close, friendship with fellow WWE alumnus "Stone Cold" Steve Austin, a relationship both parties have frequently described as sibling-like. They first met during their overlapping tenures on the Raw brand in the early 2000s, where they routinely collaborated on televised storylines—such as a 2003 segment involving La Résistance—as well as unscripted post-show "dark segments" featuring Austin's signature beer celebrations. Austin also formed a deep personal relationship with her father, U.S. Army Lieutenant Colonel Eduardo Garcia, prior to his death in 2016. Following her departure from full-time touring, the two became neighbors in Marina Del Rey, California. Austin served as a primary source of emotional and rehabilitation support for Garcia following a near-fatal pedestrian accident in Los Angeles in October 2012, where she suffered severe spinal trauma after being struck by an SUV. They have remained frequent media collaborators, with Austin appearing on early episodes of Garcia's podcast, Chasing Glory, and Garcia regularly guesting on The Steve Austin Show.

She also shares a close friendship with seven-time WWE Women's Champion Trish Stratus, whom she first knew during both their early days at WWE.

On March 17, 2007, Garcia twisted her knee in heavy snow while skiing in Killington, Vermont, incurring a torn anterior cruciate ligament. She underwent surgery on her knee on April 5, 2007, in New York City under Armin Tehrany. She returned to Raw on July 2. On November 6, 2009, Garcia almost got robbed during the New York Yankees' 2009 World Series ticker-tape parade. She said that a "punk kid" came up to her and tried to steal her phone. When Garcia wouldn't relinquish the phone, the assailant threw her to the ground and ran away. Garcia suffered a scraped elbow. On October 26, 2012, Garcia was struck by a car in Los Angeles, causing multiple contusions and lacerations on the left side of her body. Doctors immobilized Garcia's neck, after which she was said to be in a stable condition. She was released from the hospital two days later.

On December 26, 2016, Garcia announced that her father had died on Christmas Day, who was battling two different unidentified types of cancer.

== Discography ==
- WWE Anthology (2002)
- WWE Originals (2004)
- ¡Quiero Vivir! (2007)
- 2008 Año de Exitos Pop (2008)
- My Time (2012)
