= Angel of Vengeance =

Angel of Vengeance may refer to:

== Film ==
- Ms .45, a 1981 revenge film also known as Angel of Vengeance
- Angel of Vengeance (1987 film), a 1987 revenge film directed by Ted V. Mikels and Ray Dennis Steckler
- Angel of Vengeance (Miao jie shi san mei), a 1993 Taiwan-Hong Kong film starring Alex Fong

== Television ==
- Angel of Vengeance (TV series), a 1993 Singaporean series starring Chen Tianwen
- Acrata, a DC Comics character known as the Angel of Vengeance in the TV series Smallville

== Other uses ==
- Angels of Vengeance (Birmingham novel), the third book in John Birmingham's Disappearance series

== See also ==
- Vengeance (Angel novel), 2002 novel set in the Buffyverse concerning the character Angel
- Avenging Angel (disambiguation)
- Angel's Revenge (disambiguation)
