= Angelle =

Angelle is a surname and given name. Notable people with the name include:

- Angelle (singer) (Sarah Bennett, born c. 1980), British singer
- Angelle Sampey (born 1970), American motorcycle racer
- Angelle Tymon (born 1983), American journalist
- Felecia Angelle (born 1986), American voice actor
- Lisa Angelle (born 1965), American musician
- Scott Angelle (born 1961), American politician

== See also ==
- Angel (disambiguation)
- Angell (disambiguation)
