= El Ángel (disambiguation) =

El Ángel commonly refers to the Angel of Independence in Mexico City.

El Ángel may also refer to:

- El Ángel (wrestler) (born 1997), Mexican luchador
- El Ángel, Ecuador, Carchi province
- El Angel (film), a 2018 Argentine-Spanish film
- El Ángel metro station, in Lima, Peru
- El Ángel (Mexico City Metrobús)

== See also ==
- Ángel, a given name
- Angel (disambiguation)
