= Angell (disambiguation) =

Angell may refer to:

== People ==
- Angell, a list of people with the surname
- Angell (family), in Norway
- Angell Conwell (born 1983), American actress and model

== Fictional characters ==
- Jessica Angell, a fictional detective in CSI: NY

== Places ==
- Angell Woods
- Angell Hall, building at the University of Michigan in Ann Arbor, US
- Angell Street, a major one-way thoroughfare in Providence, Rhode Island

== Other uses ==
- MSPCA-Angell, an American humane society
- Order of Angell, an honorary society at the University of Michigan
- Angell Hall Observatory, an astronomical observatory at the University of Michigan
- Angell Park Speedway, a dirt racetrack in Sun Prairie, Wisconsin
- Angell Treaty of 1880
- An archaic spelling of angel
- Angell (Lambeth ward)

== See also ==
- Angel (disambiguation)
