= Angel's Revenge =

Angel's Revenge may refer to:

- Angels Revenge, a 1979 American film
- Angel's Revenge (TV series), a 2014 South Korean TV series

== See also ==
- Angel of Vengeance (disambiguation)
- Avenging Angel (disambiguation)
- Revenging Angels (novel), a novel in the Morgan Kane series
- "Revenging Angel" (TV episode), a 2001 season 3 number 16 episode 60 of Farscape
