= Anna A. Angell =

American physician

- Born: February 13, 1844; New Jersey
- Died: June 8, 1906 (aged 62)
- Occupation: Medical doctor

Anna Adelia Angell (February 13, 1844 – June 8, 1906) was an American physician.

Born in New Jersey, February 13, 1844, she graduated from the New York Infirmary School in 1871 and soon after became a resident physician at Mt. Sinai Hospital, at the instance of several members of the medical staff. This was the first general hospital in the country to confer a regular hospital appointment on a woman. She served three years very acceptably.

In conjunction with Dr. Mary Putnam Jacobi, she founded a dispensary at Mt. Sinai Hospital, which has since had women on the staff.

Upon leaving Mt. Sinai, she studied in Europe for a couple of years and returning took up work in the tenement house districts.

In January, 1877, she became resident physician of the New York Infant Asylum. There during her three years of service the death rate among the children was materially lowered. Soon after leaving the Infant Asylum, ill health forced Dr. Angell to retire from practice, to her a blow and disappointment not light to bear, but her many years of invalidism were endured with a fortitude only born of a strong character. She died June 8, 1906.

== Sources ==
- Withington, Alfreda Bosworth. "Angell, Anna A." . In Kelly, Howard A.; Burrage, Walter L. (eds.). American Medical Biographies . Baltimore: The Norman, Remington Company. p. 31.
