= 天使 =

天使, meaning "angel" in Chinese, may refer to:

- Amatsuka, a Japanese surname
  - Moe Amatsuka (born 1994), Japanese actress and singer
  - Megumi Amatsuka, the protagonist of the manga series Cheeky Angel
- Tenshi, a spiritual being in Japanese Buddhism
- Zhong Tianshi (born 1991), Chinese track cyclist

== See also ==
- Angel (disambiguation)
- Tenshi (disambiguation)
