= Tianzi =

Tianzi may refer to:

- Son of Heaven, a title of the Chinese sovereign
- Tianzi Mountain, a mountain in Hunan, China
- Empress Tianzi, a character in the anime television series Code Geass
- Tianzi, a Taoist treatise by Tian Pian

== See also ==
- Tenshi (disambiguation)
