= Earth Angel (disambiguation) =

Earth Angel, is a song by American doo-wop group the Penguins

It may also refer to:

- Earth Angel, a 1991 TV movie starring Cindy Williams
- "Earth Angel" (Runaways), an episode of Runaways
- "Earth Angel", an episode of the American TV series Married... with Children
- "Earth Angels", an episode of the American sitcom sequel The New Leave It to Beaver

== See also ==
- Angel (disambiguation)
- The Earth Angels, a Spanish doo-wop vocal group
