= Koutammakou =

Landscape

Koutammakou, the Land of the Batammariba
UNESCO World Heritage Site
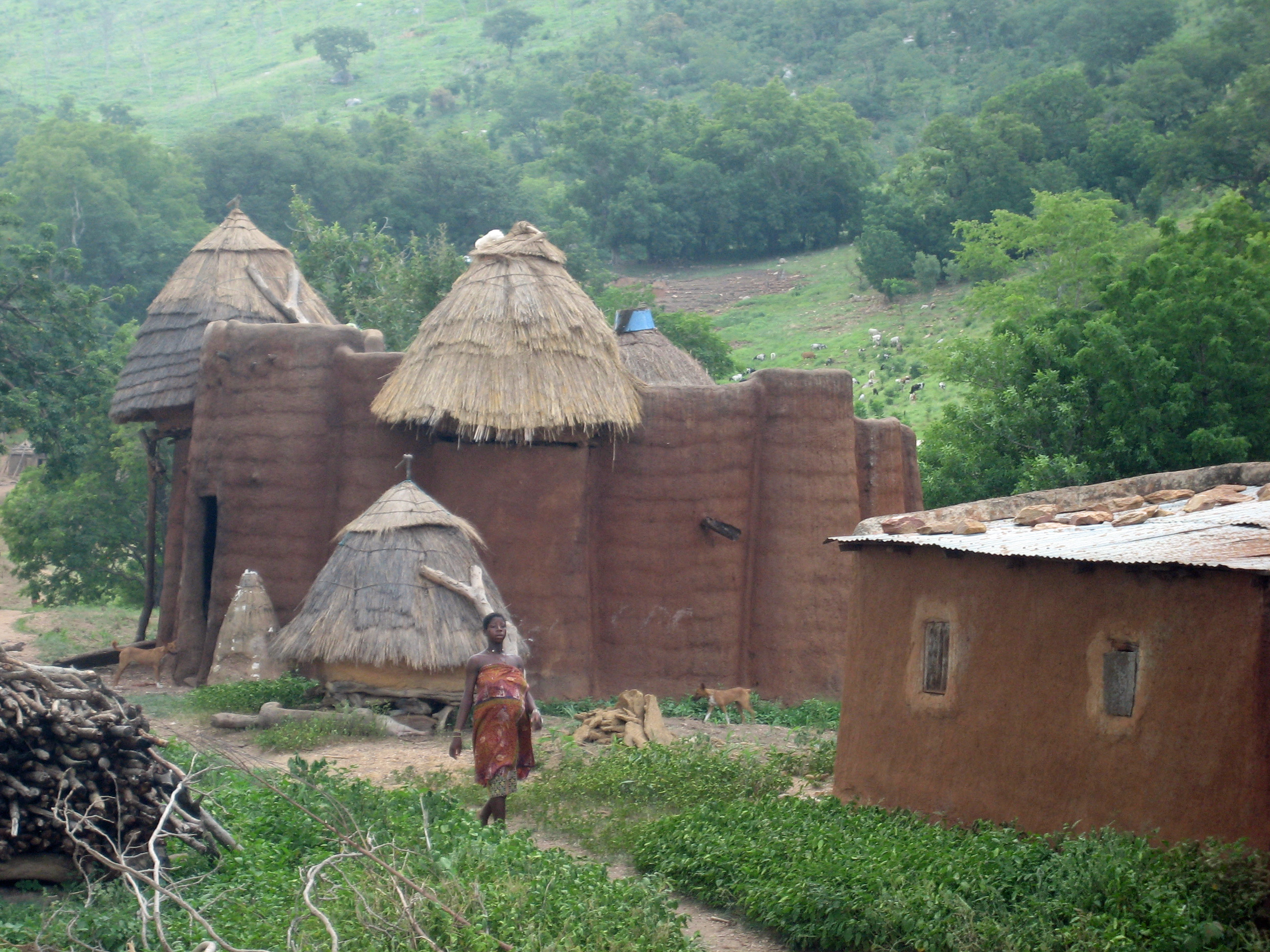
- Interactive map of Koutammakou, the Land of the Batammariba
- Official name: Koutammakou, the Land of the Batammariba
- Location: Kara Region, Togo / Atakora Department, Benin
- Criteria: Cultural: (vi), (v)
- Reference: 1140
- Inscription: 2004 (28th Session)
- Extensions: 2023
- Area: 271,826 ha (671,700 acres)
- Coordinates: 10°4′N 1°8′E

Koutammakou, the Land of the Batammariba (French: Koutammakou, le pays des Batammariba) is a cultural landscape designated in 2004 and expanded in 2023 as a UNESCO World Heritage Site at the border between northern Togo and Benin. The area features traditional mud tower-houses which remain the preferred style of living. The traditional mud houses are known as a national symbol of Togo. Many of the mud houses have two floors and some of them have flat roofs.

In 2008, to complete the inscription of the site to World Heritage, the Department of Intangible Cultural Heritage (ICH) of UNESCO, headed by Rieks Smeets, set up the "Safeguarding of the Cultural Intangible Heritage of Batammariba" from the 2003 Convention. The goal was to promote sustainability in Intergenerational transmission and preservation of skills and knowledge in all the essential areas of their culture, such as the manufacture of everyday and ceremonial objects, traditional healing and useful plants, takyentas construction, dance, music, archery, oral traditions, promotion of tourism respecting local traditions, mapping sacred areas, accumulation of data on the intangible cultural heritage and creation of access to it, recordings, films and photos.

This program was coordinated by the Ministry of Culture and the Ministry of Primary Education of Togo, led by minister Angèle Dola Akofa Aguigah. Dominique Sewane, whose groundwork and her research and publications on the Batammaribas’ ceremonial life, had an important role in the designation.

From 19 to 24 October 2018, UNESCO organized an emergency mission to assess the damage caused by the August 2018 rains in Koutammakou on habitat and intangible heritage. The report was prepared by three international experts: Ishanlosen Odiaua, Dominique Sewane and Franck Ogou.

== History ==
The Tammari peoples, for which Koutammakou is inhabited, have lived on this site for hundreds of years. They migrated to the area sometime during the 17th or 18th century.

Koutammakou was designated as a UNESCO World Heritage Site in 2004, inscribing it as the Land of the Batammariba. The site was extended in 2023.

The traditional houses of Koutammakou are known as Siken and are the official national symbol of Togo. They reflect the unique animistic beliefs and traditions of the community.

== Bibliography ==
- Philippe et Marie Huet, Koutammakou : portraits en pays somba, Nord Bénin, Hesse, Saint-Claude-de-Diray, 2012, 155 p. (ISBN 978-2-35706-021-0)
- Albert-Marie Maurice, Atakora : Otiau, Otammari, Osari, peuples du Nord-Bénin (1950), Académie des sciences d'outre-mer, Paris, 1986, 481 p. (ISBN 2-900098-11-4)
- Paul Mercier, Tradition, changement, histoire. Les “Somba” du Dahomey septentrional, Anthropos, Paris, 1968, 538 p. (texte remanié d'une thèse)
- Suzanne Preston-Blier, The Anatomy of Architecture – Ontology and metaphor in Batammaliba architectural expression, Cambridge University Press, Cambridge, 1987, 314 p. (ISBN 0-226-05861-1)
- Dominique Sewane Rapport final en vue de l’inscription du Koutammakou, pays des Batammariba au Togo sur la liste des sites classés du Patrimoine mondial de l’Unesco, décembre 2002, 102 pages
- Dominique Sewane Rapport de coordination du Programme de sauvegarde du Patrimoine culturel immatériel des Batammariba du Koutammakou – Première Phase (novembre 2008- novembre 2009)
- Dominique Sewane, La nuit des grands morts : l’initiée et l’épouse chez les Tamberma du Togo (préface de Jean Malaurie), Economica, Paris, 2002, 272 p. + pl. (ISBN 2-7178-4484-8) (texte remanié d'une thèse)
- Dominique Sewane, Le souffle du mort : la tragédie de la mort chez les Batãmmariba du Togo, Bénin, Plon, « Collection Terre humaine », 2007, 849 p. + pl., 2020, collection Terre Humaine, Plon (ISBN 978-2-266-17579-1) (prix Robert Cornevin)
- Dominique Sewane, Les Batãmmariba, le peuple voyant : carnets d’une ethnologue, éditions de La Martinière, Paris, 192 p. (ISBN 2-7324-3209-1)
- Dominique Sewane, « Rites et pensée des Batammariba » pour les écoles primaires du Togo, Ministère des Enseignements Primaire Secondaire et de l’Alphabétisation duTogo, Patrimoine Culturel Immatériel de l’UNESCO, éditions Haho, Lomé (Togo), Éditions Haho, Togo, 2009 (in Programme de sauvegarde du Patrimoine immatériel des Batammariba – Unesco-Japan)
- Dominique Sewane, Bantéé N’Koué, Bakoukalébé Kpakou, Koutammakou - Lieux sacrés, Préface de Jean Malaurie, éditions Hesse, 2018, (ISBN 978-2-35706-041-8)
- Jean Pierre Vallat (dir.), Le Togo : lieux de mémoire et sites de conscience, L’Harmattan, Paris, 2013, 204 p. + pl. (ISBN 978-2-336-29117-8)
