= Angels (statues) =

Group of three monumental, primitive busts in the city of Maribor, Slovenia

Coordinates: 46°34′05″N 15°37′39″E

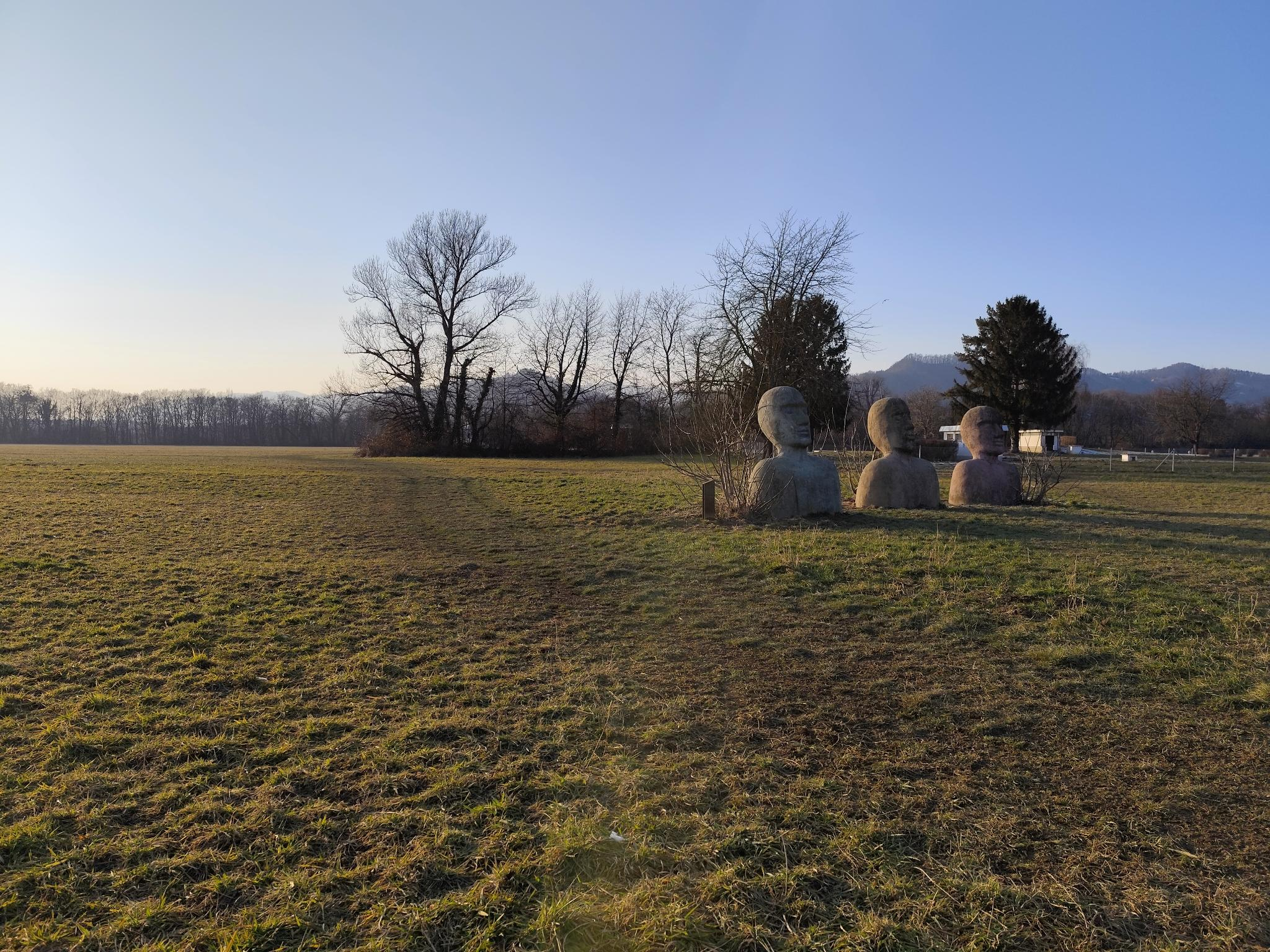
The Angels in Urbani-Plateau

The Angels (Slovene: Angeli) are a group of three monumental, primitive busts, located in a park near Kalvarija Hill in the city of Maribor, Slovenia. The statues are made of colored concrete and are approximately three metres tall. Each is a different color (pale green, pale yellow, pink) and has slightly different facial proportions. They represent angels, a common theme of their sculptor Lučka Koščak.

They were erected in 2004, with the support of the municipality of Maribor and the Sculpture Institute from Ljubljana. Local residents have nicknamed them "Sveta Trojica" (Holy Trinity).
