= Taher Shah =

Pakistani comedian and singer-songwriter

- Born: Karachi, Pakistan
- Occupations: Singer, songwriter, music producer, internet personality, businessman
- Years active: 2013–present
- Website: tahershah.com

Taher Shah is a Pakistani-born singer-songwriter, music producer, internet personality, and businessman who is best known for his songs "Eye to Eye" and "Angel". He has been described as "Pakistan's most spectacular internet celebrity" by Dawn newspaper. It was thought that he left singing after receiving death threats, but he released an animated Urdu song,"Farishta", (Children are the angels of the earth) in April 2020.

== Career ==
Shah became famous in 2013 when he released his first song "Eye to Eye". In an interview, he stated that it took him a year and half to write the lyrics for the song and to complete the whole project. According to Indian Express, the song achieved "enormous success", and according to The Atlantic the song made him an "overnight pop sensation". The song went viral on social media, and many artists dedicated their covers to the singer. In 2016, Shah's new video for the song "Mankind's Angel" was released, causing what the BBC described as a "social media frenzy".

In December 2016, it was announced that Shah had left Pakistan after receiving death threats. He currently resides in the United States with his family.

In April 2020, he released an animated Urdu music video named "Farishta" ("Angel").

In June 2023, his management team announced the creation of a "Hollywood movie" titled "Eye to Eye".

In June 2025, Taher Shah unveiled his latest project titled "Peace" (Humans Can Create a World of Peace). This release is described as a "cosmic peace anthem" and a "cosmic call to humanity." It's an animated odyssey with hypnotic visuals and Taher Shah's unique voice delivering a message about humans destroying the only planet known to harbor life while searching for it elsewhere. The song aims to promote harmony and understanding, especially in a world grappling with various conflicts. It emphasizes that "humans can create a world that is a cradle of peace instead of ending it through war." This release aligns with his consistent theme of spreading messages of love and humanity through his art.
