= Alfreda Bosworth Withington =

American physician

- Born: August 15, 1860; Germantown, Pennsylvania, U.S.
- Died: October 1, 1951 (aged 91); Pittsfield, Massachusetts, U.S.
- Education: Cornell University
- Occupation: Physician
- Medical career
- Notable works: Mine eyes have seen: a woman doctor's saga OCLC 2139718

Alfreda Bosworth Withington (August 15, 1860 – October 1, 1951) was an American physician and author.

== Biography ==
Withington was born in Germantown, Pennsylvania in present-day Philadelphia, where her father, James Hervey Withington, was headmaster of Germantown Academy. She was named for her mother, Alfreda Bosworth. She attended Cornell University in Ithaca, New York from 1877 to 1881. She then interned at the New York Infirmary for Women and Children, but was refused a position at the Infirmary, since none of the directors would agree to let her take the entrance examination.

At the age of 63, she obtained a Kentucky medical license and traveled to work as a medical settlement physician for seven years, between 1924 and 1931, ordinarily making calls on horseback. Withington wrote her memoir titled Mine Eyes Have Seen in 1941.

== Death ==
On October 1, 1951, she died.
