= Angèle Aguigah =

Togolese archaeologist and politician

- Born: Angèle Dola Akofa Aguigah; 4 December 1955 (age 70)
- Citizenship: Togolese
- Occupations: Archaeologist; Government Minister

Academic background
- Education: University of Paris I, Pantheon-Sorbonne

Academic work
- Discipline: Archaeology
- Institutions: University of Lomé

Angèle Dola Akofa Aguigah (born 4 December 1955) is a Togolese archaeologist and politician. She was the first female archaeologist from Togo, and in 2017 she was given the honor of “Human Living Treasure of Togo“.

== Biography ==
Angèle Dola Akofa Aguigah was born on 4 December 1955 in Lomé, Togo, where she grew up. She studied at the University of Paris I, Pantheon-Sorbonne from 1978 to 1986, where she graduated with degrees in: License in Archaeology and History of Art; MA in African Archaeology; Diploma of Advanced Studies; PhD in African Archaeology. She is one of the few academics in West Africa to hold two PhDs - she graduated with her second in 1995 under the supervision of Jean Devisse at the University of Paris 1 Pantheon-Sorbonne.

== Career ==
In addition to a successful career in archaeology, Aguigah has also held high political offices in the Government of Togo.

=== Archaeology ===
Aguigah is head of the Archaeological Programme of Togo and is a senior lecturer at the University of Lomé and University of Kara. She is an international consultant on cultural heritage and has lectured widely. She researched traditional floor coverings in Togo. This research concentrated on a survey of potsherd floorings at Tado. This research also demonstrated that archaeo-metallurgical activities had taken place there since the eleventh century.

She has directed archaeological excavations at Notsé, Tado, Dapaong, Nook (Togo), and Bè sites. Her research at Notsé demonstrated that the earthworks built there were not used for defence, but to define the space as socially distinct. As a result of her collaboration with Nicoue Gayibor, their excavations were able to demonstrate that the thirty-three neighbourhoods at Notsé were made up of family enclosures. She coordinated World Heritage Site applications for Togo, with particular concern for the cave sites of Nook and Mamproug.

=== Politics ===
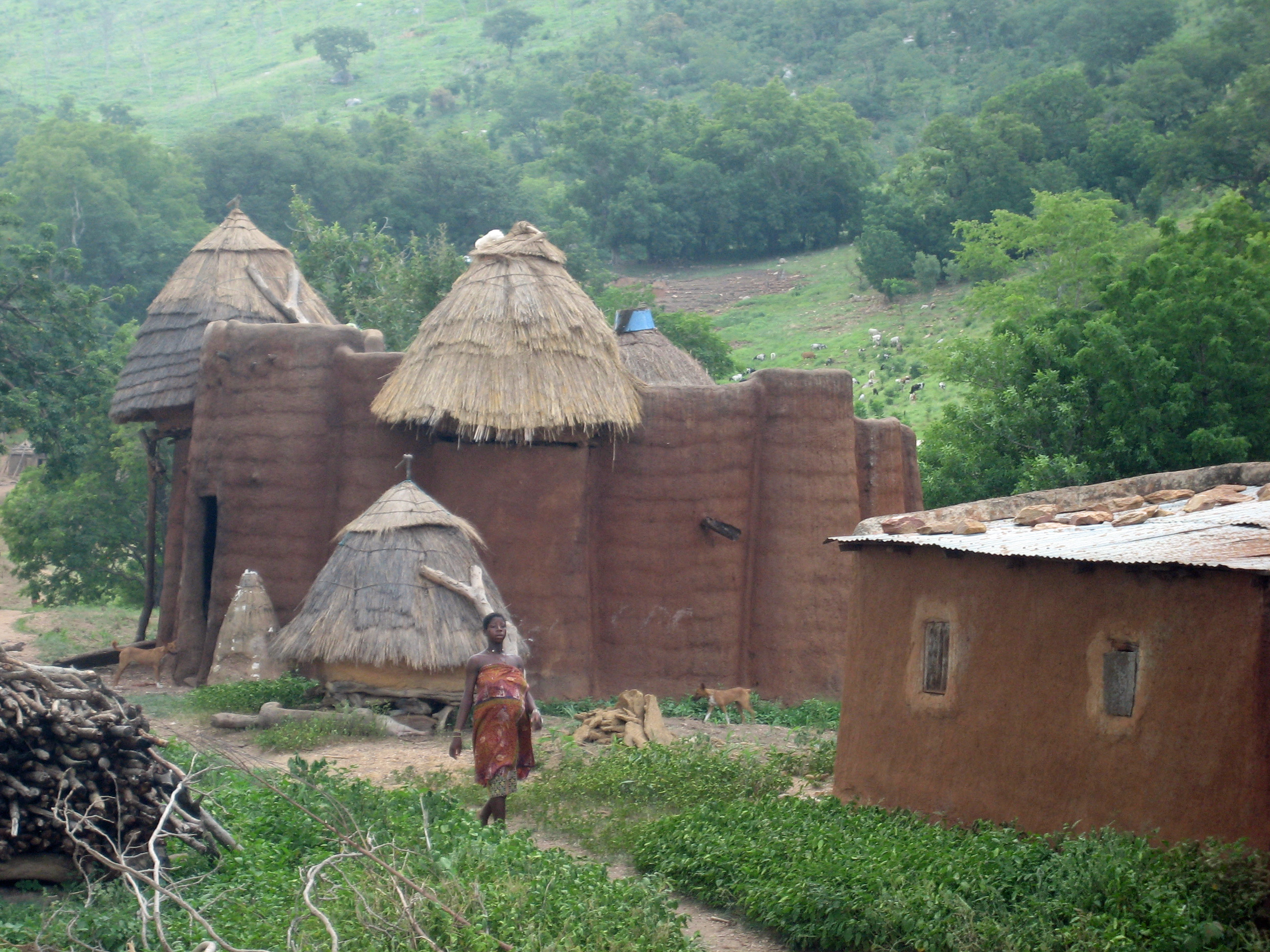
Taberma house in Koutammakou, Togo

Aguigah's experience in archaeology and heritage meant that work in government became a second phase of her career. From 2000 to 2003 she was Minister Delegate to the Prime Minister's Office in charge of Private Sector of Togo. From 2003 she was Minister of Culture of Togo. During her ministry the Cultural Landscape of Koutammakou was registered as a World Heritage Site and a programme of public engagement. She also encouraged a decentralisation of cultural industries in Togo, in order to create more regional opportunities.

In 2012, Aguigah became director of the Independent National Electoral Commission (CENI) in Benin. Her time at CENI was not without controversy: she announced that elections could be ready in May 2013, ahead of the government's expected date of October, which caused opposition from the government. She had previously been an RTP candidate in the 2007 legislative elections. She has been outspoken about the need for internal and external investment on the archaeological heritage of Togo.

== Publications ==
- Le site de Notsé : problématique de son importance historique des premiers résultats archéologiques, 1981
- Le site de Notsé : contribution à l'archéologie du Togo, 1986
- Les problèmes de conservation des pavements en tessons de poterie du Togo, 1993
- Pavements et terres damées dans les régions du Golfe du Bénin : enquête archéologique et historique, 1995
- Approche ethnoarchéologique survivances d'unetechnique ancienne d'aménagement du sol chez les Kabiye au Nord Togo, 2002
- L'archeologie a la recherche du royaume de Notse, 2004
- Archéologie et architecture traditionnelle en Afrique de l'Ouest : le cas des revêtements de sols au Togo : une étude comparée, 2018
