= Angele (deme) =

Coordinates: 37°53′55″N 23°57′47″E

Angele (Ancient Greek: Ἀγγελή) was a deme of ancient Attica, of the phyle of Pandionis, sending two, three, or four delegates to the Athenian Boule. Its site is located near modern Angelisi.
