= The Angel (bushranger) =

Australian bushranger (1858 - 1885)

Thomas Hobson (c. 1858 – 11 April 1885), alias the Angel, was an Australian bushranger active in northern New South Wales. Imprisoned for cattle theft, he shot dead a constable to effect an escape with a fellow inmate, and they were both killed one month later in a shootout with the police.

== Life ==
Hobson worked as a butcher in Coonamble before engaging in cattle duffing, going by the alias Thomas Angel, later shortened simply to the Angel. In October 1884, he was arrested for stealing cattle belonging to pastoralist Henry White, receiving a four-year prison sentence. He was initially imprisoned at Bathurst Gaol before being transferred back to Coonamble Gaol.

On 12 March 1885, Hobson, along with fellow prisoners William White and a third inmate, beat a warder named Michael Langby unconscious and seized his revolver. Constable John Mitchell overheard the struggle and confronted Hobson, who fatally shot him in the chest. Hobson and White escaped into the bush, taking up bushranging in the Warrumbungles and surrounding areas. The Government of New South Wales offered a £400 reward for their capture with police and volunteers from Pilliga, Coonabarabran, Gulargambone and other townships in the region joining the manhunt.

Over the following month, Hobson and White gradually made their way north as they raided isolated settlers' houses and stores. They planned to continue into Queensland but decided to stay in New South Wales in order to murder a particular constable they had a grudge against. In September 1885, while holding up a store outside Gulgong, Hobson and White were ambushed by three policemen. Upon realising they were cornered, Hobson shot dead the store owner Charles Stewart. In the ensuing shootout, Hobson and White received fatal gunshot wounds. White died almost instantly while Hobson lingered for several more hours, dying at Gulgong Hospital the following day.

== Bibliography ==
- Haydon, Arthur Lincoln (1911). The Trooper Police of Australia: A Record of Mounted Police Work in the Commonwealth from the Earliest Days of Settlement to the Present Time. A. Melrose.
