= Sainte-Angèle, Quebec =

The following places in Quebec, Canada are named Sainte-Angèle:

- Sainte-Angèle-de-Laval, Quebec
- Sainte-Angèle-de-Mérici, Quebec
- Sainte-Angèle-de-Prémont, Quebec
- Sainte-Angèle-de-Monnoir, Quebec
