= Angel (Taher Shah song) =

Song by Taher Shah
- Language: English
- Released: April 8, 2016
- Recorded: 2016
- Length: 5:44
- Songwriter: Taher Shah
- Producer: Taher Shah

Music video
- "Angel" on YouTube

"Angel" is a 2016 song and music video written, produced and performed by Pakistani singer-songwriter Taher Shah. It was released in April 2016.

Angel is Shah's second song. Like his first song, "Eye to Eye", "Angel" caused a social media frenzy and made #TaherShah a trending topic on Twitter in Pakistan, India and the UK. Since its release on April 8, 2016, Angel has been viewed more than 6 million times on Shah's YouTube channel. The music video also features his son.

== Lyrics ==
The song's simple lyrics, "I am like an angel, mankind's angel, lonely for you", attracted listeners who both mocked Shah's talent and also praised his confidence.

== Public reception ==
The song has received immense popularity, both good and bad, worldwide. It hit 1 million views within a week of release, owing to Taher Shah's popularity from his previous song, "Eye to Eye". The song has been trending on all social platforms, with multiple YouTube channels and Facebook pages creating parodies of the song within 12 hours of release.
