= Angel of Death =

Angel of Death may refer to:

== Arts, entertainment and media ==
=== Fictional characters ===
- Adam or Andrew, in Touched by an Angel
- Azrael, in Lucifer
- Loki, in the film Dogma
- Grim Reaper, a popular personification of death

=== Gaming ===
- Broken Sword: The Angel of Death, a 2007 computer game
- Angels of Death (video game), a Japanese horror computer game, 2015

=== Literature ===
- Angel of Death (novel), by Jack Higgins, 1995
- Angel of Death, a novel by Alane Ferguson

=== Music ===
- "Angel of Death" (Hank Williams song), 1954
- "Angel of Death" (Slayer song), 1986
- "Angel of Death" (Thin Lizzy song), 1982
- "Angel of Death", a song by Angel Witch on Angel Witch (album), 1980
- "Angel of Death", a song by Helstar on the album Remnants of War, 1986
- Angel of Death, a symphonic poem by George Whitefield Chadwick, 1918
- "Angel of Death", a song by Manchester Orchestra on The Million Masks of God, 2021
- "Angel of Death", track 15 in M3GAN (soundtrack) composed by Anthony Willis, 2022

=== Television ===
- "Angel of Death" (NCIS), a 2007 TV episode
- "The Angel of Death", a 2007 episode of Robin Hood
- "The Angel of Death" (Dexter), a 2011 episode of Dexter
- "Angel of Death", a season 2 episode of Castlevania: Nocturne, 2025
- Angel of Death (web series), 2009
- Angel of Death, a 2005 BBC dramatization of the life of Beverley Allitt
- Angel of Death (Polish TV series), a 2020 television series

== People ==
- Angel of Death (wrestler) (David Sheldon, 1953–2007), American wrestler
- Common media nickname for health care professionals convicted of murdering patients, including
  - Beverley Allitt (born 1968), British nurse who murdered four children in 1991
  - Charles Cullen (born 1960), American nurse who murdered at least 29 patients in Pennsylvania and New Jersey medical centers over a 16-year career
  - Kristen Gilbert (born 1967), American nurse who murdered four patients in Massachusetts, U.S.
  - Donald Harvey (1952–2017), American orderly and convicted serial killer who claims to have murdered 87 people
  - Orville Lynn Majors (1961–2017), American nurse who murdered at least 6, possibly 130, elderly patients
  - Josef Mengele (1911–1979), German SS officer and Nazi concentration camp doctor
  - Colin Norris (born 1976), British nurse and serial killer
  - Harold Shipman (1946–2004), British doctor who murdered up to 250 elderly patients
- Allison Black, American military officer who fought in Afghanistan during Operation Enduring Freedom
- August Miete (1908–1987), German SS officer and Nazi extermination camp officer
- Robledo Puch (born 1952), Argentine serial killer
- Louis Antoine de Saint-Just (1767–1794), French revolutionary organizer of the Reign of Terror
- Charles Heatherly (born 1942), American bureaucrat who fired six regional administrators who opposed plans for elimination of the agency

== Religion ==
- Azrael, or Malak al-Maut, in Islam
- Destroying angel (Bible) in the Hebrew Bible
- Dumah (angel), in Rabbinical and Islamic literature
- Michael (archangel), in some religions
- Mot (god), an angel of death from the Hebraic Book of Habakkuk
- Nasirdîn and Sejadin, in Yazidism
- Samael, in Talmudic and post-Talmudic lore
- Saureil, in Mandaeism
- Sariel in some understandings
- Remiel in some understandings

== Other uses ==
- Angel of death (criminology), a type of serial killer
- Amanita ocreata or angel of death, a species of poisonous mushroom
- "Angel of Death", AC130 gunship's nickname
- "Angel of Death", putative vector of the 1995 Dungarvan AIDS panic

== See also ==
- Angels of Death (disambiguation)
- Personifications of death
- Death angel (disambiguation)
- Destroying angel (disambiguation)
- Exterminating Angel (disambiguation)
- Alfredo Astiz (born 1951), Argentine Navy officer known as the "Blond Angel of Death"
- Death and the Sculptor, also known as Angel of Death and the Sculptor, a sculpture by Daniel Chester French
- Santa Muerte, a sacred figure venerated primarily in Mexico
- Shinigami, god or spirit of death in Japanese mythology
- Thanatos, the personification of death in Greek mythology
- Yama, lord of death, in early Rigvedic Hinduism
