= Kalvarija (hill) =

Hill in Maribor, Slovenia

Coordinates: 46°34′8.9″N 15°38′23.32″E

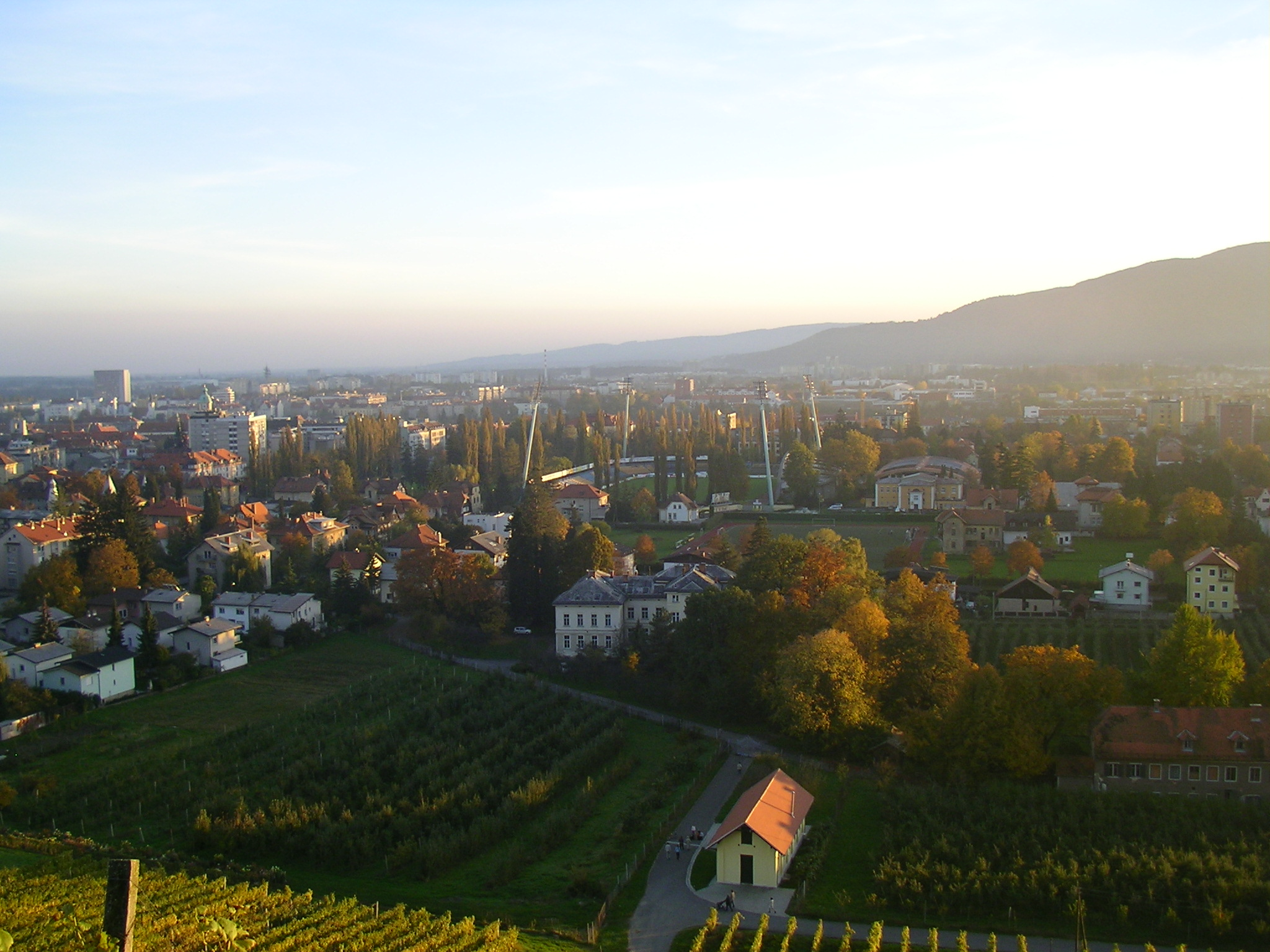
View of the city from the hill

Kalvarija is a hill overlooking the city of Maribor in Slovenia. It has an elevation of 375 meters (1,230 ft).
