= Angéle de la Barthe =

French woman accused of witchcraft (1230–1275)

Angéle de la Barthe (c. 1230–1275) was allegedly a woman from Toulouse, France, who was tried for witchcraft and condemned to death by the Inquisition in 1275. She has been popularly portrayed as the first person to be put to death for heretical sorcery during the witch persecutions. Recent scholars have proven that her story, and trial, were fabricated by a 15th-century writer.

== Narrative ==
According to the account of her trial, Angéle de la Barthe was accused by Inquisitor Hugues de Beniols (the supreme chief of the Toulouse Inquisition) of having habitual sexual intercourse with the Devil and giving birth, seven years prior at age 53, to a monster with a wolf's head and a serpent's tail. The monster's sole food consisted of babies, which were either slain by Angéle de la Barthe or dug up from their graves in remote churchyards. She confessed to having fed it babies for two years, before the monster ran away in the middle of the night. She also boasted of having had commerce with the Demon, and of being a constant attendant at the Sabbat. Hugues de la Beniols did not inquire if it was true that for two years a large number of babies had disappeared. Angéle de la Barthe was found guilty and burned alive at Place Saint Stephen, in Toulouse.

== Legacy ==
Contemporary scholars have cast doubt on the truth of the Angèle de la Barthe story since there is no mention of her trial in the Toulouse records of the time. Additionally, in 1275, congress with demons was not yet considered a crime. Ultimately, the fifteenth-century chronicle from which her story derives is considered fictional.
