= Super Wrestle Angels =

1994 video game

- Cover art
- Developer(s): Great
- Publisher(s): Imagineer
- Composer(s): Masaki Tanimoto; Masanaga Matsuoka; Shingo Shimizu
- Series: Wrestle Angels
- Platform(s): Super Famicom
- Release: JP: December 16, 1994
- Genre(s): Card; Sports (Wrestling)
- Mode(s): Single-player; Multiplayer

Super Wrestle Angels (スーパーレッスルエンジェルス) is a Japan-exclusive wrestling-based video game published by Imagineer in 1994, for the Super Famicom.

== See also ==
- Bishōjo game
- List of licensed wrestling video games
