= Angel Hotel, Bury St Edmunds =

Hotel in Bury St Edmunds

Coordinates: 52°14′41″N 0°42′56″E

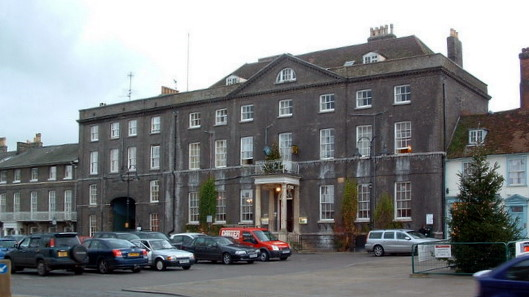
The Angel Hotel

The Angel Hotel is a grade II* listed hotel in Angel Hill, Bury St Edmunds, Suffolk, England.
