= Tony Angell =

American wildlife artist, environmental educator, and writer

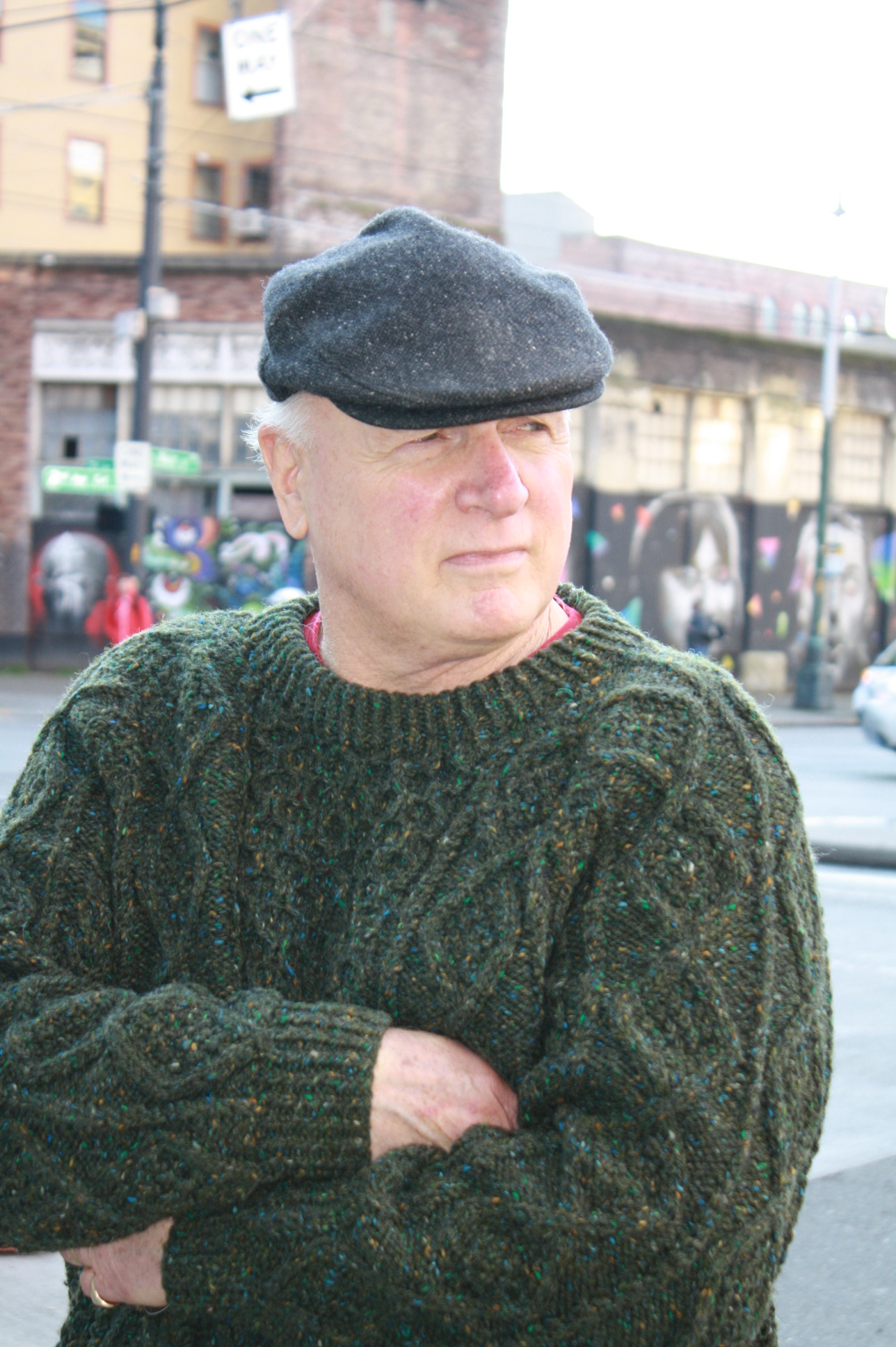
- Angell in front of Foster/White Gallery in historic Pioneer Square Seattle
- Born: 1940 (age 85–86); Los Angeles, California
- Known for: bird illustration, sculpture
- Awards: V&A Illustration Awards, 2006
- Elected: American Ornithologists Union, member; National Sculpture Society, fellow; Explorers Club, fellow

Tony Angell is an American wildlife artist, environmental educator, and writer. He has lived in Seattle, Washington, since 1959.

== Life ==
Angell was born in Los Angeles, California, in 1940. His father was a private eye, and his mother a painter and teacher. Angell grew up in the San Fernando Valley. As a child, he explored the Los Angeles River to hunt and fish, as well as the local beaches to surf and skin dive. This early exposure to nature instilled in him a life-long respect for the outdoors and native animals. He went to Seattle in 1959 on an athletics scholarship and obtained a BA in Speech Communications and a MA degree from the University of Washington.

Angell taught high school and junior college communication courses before assuming the position of State Supervisor in the Office of Environmental Education for the Office of Superintendent of Public Instruction of Washington state. He remained in this position for over thirty years.

He was active in the Nature Conservancy, with time as chairman and as a member of the board of its Washington chapter. He received the national organization's highest award, the Golden Oak Leaf, for his work in establishing the Skagit River Bald Eagle Natural Area. He was recognized as a Champion of Puget Sound by the Puget Sound Keeper's Alliance in 2014. His outreach with both his writing and artwork resulted in his election into the Hall of Fame of the Department of Communications at the University of Washington.

== Artwork ==
Angell makes sculptures in bronze and stone and has shown them regularly for some forty years. He has worked in chlorite, granite, marble, sandstone, serpentine, slate and soapstone.

Among his many public commissions are Seattle's Woodland Park Zoo, the Seattle Aquarium, the City of Redmond, WA, the Mount Baker Ski Area, Sleeping Lady in Leavenworth, WA and the public libraries of Bainbridge and Lopez Island. His work is part of the Harborview Medical Center and the public collection of the Seattle Business Center. His sculptural work is included in the collections of the Museum of Northwest Art, the Seattle Art Museum, the Frye Art Museum, the Tacoma Art Museum, the Gilcrease Museum of Art in Tulsa, Oklahoma, and the National Museum of Wildlife Art in Jackson Hole, Wyoming. Cornell University has his paintings in their collections, as does the Victoria and Albert Museum in London, England.

Awards for his artwork include the Master Artist Medal from the Leigh Yawkey Woodson Art Gallery of Wausau, Wisconsin, and a first prize award in illustration from the Victoria and Albert Museum in 2006. His sculpture Stretching Kestrel received the Chilmark Award from the National Sculpture Society, an organization of which he is an elected Fellow.

In 2016, the Museum of Northwest Art awarded a Northwest Luminaries award in Angell's name. The award is named in honor of those who have left a lasting impact on the Pacific Northwest region (including Patti Warashina and art historian Bill Holm). The award is then given to artists of promise, as chosen by a distinguished nominating panel and jury.

Angell acknowledges a number of influences on his work: the bird illustrators Don Eckelberry and Morris Graves, the carvings of the Haida, Tlingit and Tsimshian peoples of the Pacific Northwest Coast, and a Japanese Edo-period screen carved with crows in the Seattle Asian Art Museum.

== Publications ==
Writing and illustrating more than a dozen books related to nature, Angell has received the Washington State Writers Award for four of his works, including Birds of Prey of the Pacific Northwest Slope, Ravens, Crows, Magpies and Jays (University of Washington Press), and In the Company of Crows and Ravens (Yale University Press). His most recent book, The House of Owls (Yale University Press), received the 2015 National Outdoor Book Award for nature and the environment writing. His book Puget Sound Through an Artist's Eye (University of Washington Press) is a collection of his artistic works in stone, bronze and line along with a narrative that describes his artistic response to the region he lives in.

As author and illustrator:

- Birds of Prey on the Pacific Northwest Slope. Seattle: Pacific Search Press, 1972
- Owls. Seattle; London: University of Washington Press, 1974
- Ravens, Crows, Magpies and Jays. Seattle; London: University of Washington Press, 1978
- (with Kenneth Balcomb) Marine Birds and Mammals of Puget Sound. Seattle: Washington Sea Grant Publication; distributed by the University of Washington Press, 1982
- The Artist as Advocate for Nature: A Dialogue of Necessity. Bainbridge Island, WA: Arbor Fund, [1994]
- (with John Marzluff) In the Company of Crows and Ravens. New Haven; London: Yale University Press, 2005
- Puget Sound Through an Artist's Eye. Seattle; London: University of Washington Press, 2009
- (with John Marzluff) Gifts of the Crow: How Perception, Emotion, and Thought Allow Smart Birds to Behave Like Humans. New York: Simon & Schuster, 2012
- The House of Owls. New Haven: Yale University Press, 2015

As illustrator

- Gordon H. Orians (1985). Blackbirds of the Americas. Seattle; London: University of Washington Press
- Bender, Bert (1988). Sea Brothers: American Sea Fiction since Moby Dick. Philadelphia: University of Pennsylvania Press – via Questia.
- John Marzluff, Russell Balda (1992). T he Pinyon Jay: Behavioral ecology of a colonial and cooperative corvid. London: Poyser
- Hal Opperman (2003). A Birder's Guide to Washington. Colorado Springs: American Birding Association

Over the past half century the artist and his work has been featured in a number of newspaper and magazines articles. Among the most recent in news are:

- "Tony Angell: Through Wild Rock," Western Art and Architecture Magazine, May 2015
- "Tony Angell: Liberating the Spirit," Art of the West, May/June 2016
- "Tony Angell: Artist's new exhibit opens Thursday," Seattle Times blog, December 2011

== Links ==
- Artist website: www.tonyangell.net
- "Tony Angell Artist," film produced by Fidget.tv and underwritten by the Seattle Arts Commission, 2010
