= Charlie's Angels (disambiguation) =

Charlie's Angels is an American live-action television series which ran from 1976 through 1981 on the ABC television network, which revolved around three chosen women who worked for a private investigation agency founded by one man named Charlie.

Charlie's Angels may also refer to:

- Charlie's Angels (franchise), a series of films and television shows
  - Charlie's Angels (2000 film), a modern 2000 film spin-off to the original 1976–1981 television series
  - Charlie's Angels: Full Throttle, a 2003 sequel to the 2000 film spin-off
  - Charlie's Angels (2019 film), a spin-off of the television series and previous films
- Charlie's Angels (video game), a 2003 video game developed based upon the 2000 and 2003 film spin-offs.
- Behind the Camera: The Unauthorized Story of Charlie's Angels, a 2004 television docudrama
- Charlie's Angels (2011 TV series), a 2011 remake of the original 1976–1981 television series
