= George Blair Imrie =

English architect

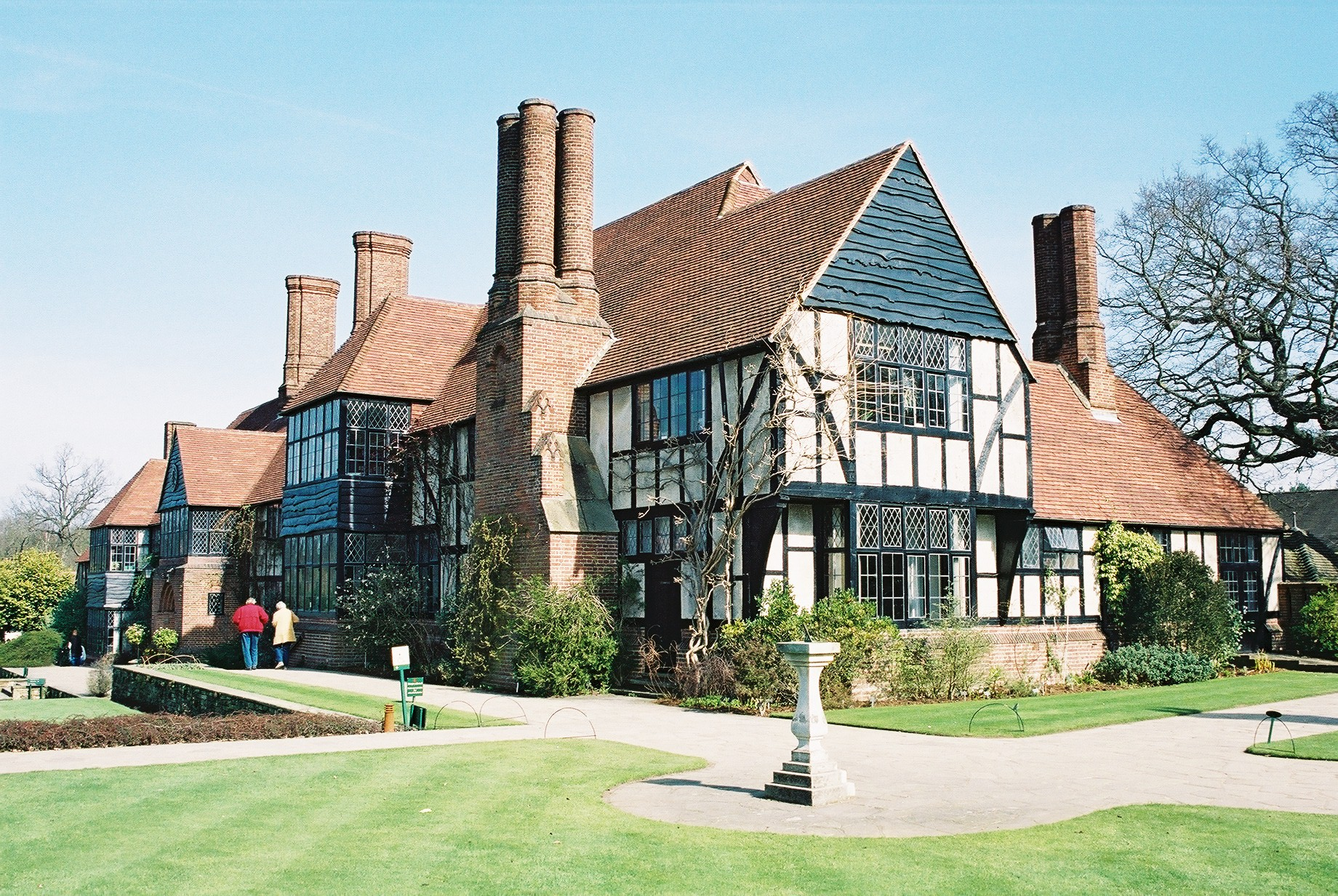
The Laboratory, Wisley (1916)

George Blair Imrie (1885–1952) was an English architect of the Arts and Crafts movement renowned for his sensitive and individual house designs.

Imrie was born in Virginia Water, Surrey in 1885, lived for many years in Esher with his wife, Helen Maud Harrison, whom he married in 1910, and died in Salisbury, Wiltshire in 1952. His parents were James Blair Imrie, clerk of works (who had been born in Edinburgh) and Alice Stallwood. (He is not the son of architect, surveyor and civil engineer, Benjamin B. Imrie of Castle Douglas, Kirkcudbrightshire, Scotland as was once thought.)

He is considered a proponent of the style now known as "Tudorbethan", along with architects such Norman Shaw, George Devey, Baillie Scott, Edwin Lutyens and the designer William Morris. His houses are renowned for their use of quality materials such as hand-made tiles and leaded lights, oak window frames and doors with wrought iron fittings yet often remain relatively modestly proportioned and low-key rather than showy and grand. Even at the time this "liveability" was noted; the 1924 book Small Family Houses by R. Randall Phillips mentions an Imrie and Angell house in Byfleet, Surrey. The aim of this book was "to bring together a collection of houses suited to the needs of the small family. It is difficult to define just what accommodation may properly be embraced by such a term, but in a general way it has been taken to mean a house with two living-rooms on the ground floor and four or five bedrooms on the first floor." Many of Imrie's houses included state-of-the-art comforts of the time such as electricity in every room and "fitted-lavatory basins" with both hot and cold running water in all the bedrooms.

His architectural practice, Imrie and Angell, was based at 2 Mitre Court Chambers in London with Thomas Gravely Angell. Prior to that he had been in partnership with E. H. Stodart and W. G. Pine-Coffin at Thanet House on the Strand and at Chipstead, Surrey, as architects, surveyors, land agents and valuers.

Much of his work was in Surrey, most notably the fine Arts and Crafts houses of Clive Road and Clair Hill in Esher, built in the 1920s, and the Chipstead area around Walpole Avenue and Chipstead Golf Course.

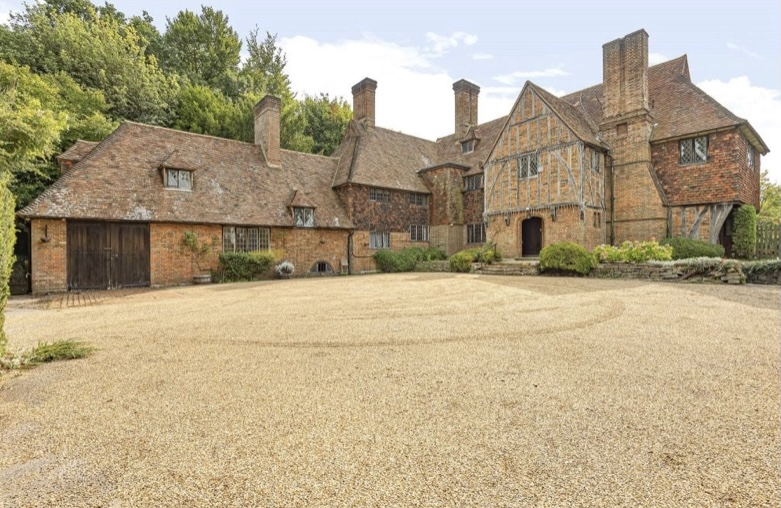

His other houses include:

- a converted barn moved from Sussex to Reigate Road, Leatherhead in 1921
- 85 Avenue Road, St John's Wood (1937)
- the Arts and Crafts gardens at Tusmore House in Oxfordshire
- the 1920s extension of Upper Terrace Lodge at Hampstead Heath
- a house in Chilmark, Wiltshire, 1936
- a large arts and crafts Grade II listed home in Chipstead which was featured in Country Life magazine in 1928

(A 1968 addition to the latter house was done by Warminster-based architects, Imrie, Porter and Wakefield, who practised mainly from the 1960s through to 1984. The firm's archive is held in the Wiltshire and Swindon Archives and includes G B Imrie's professional accounts books 1914-1937; G B Imrie's Petty Cash book 1937-1942; G B Imrie's Letters to the Times 1943-44, among others. Since Blair Imrie died in Salisbury in 1952, this firm may well have been his last professional partnership, which continued to use his name after his death. Another possibility is that a son or daughter continued in the practise.)

His firm, Imrie and Angell, was also involved in with the development from 1912 to the late 1920s of 964 acres (390 ha) of land on St George's Hill, Weybridge, into a private estate intended for wealthy businessmen, centred on a golf course.

Less known is that Blair Imrie was also the chosen architect for the close-by Burhill Estate. In 1929 sales literature included the following: "The company is fortunate in that Mr. G Blair Imrie is its architect and he has planned the whole property upon the 'close' and 'cul-de-sac' system. There will be no freak houses to disturb the eye. As his work is known far and wide." There were a number of designs created alongside this literature in 1930 for the Fairmile estate.

Most notably among his non-residential work, Imrie's architectural practice won the competition to design the main building for the Royal Horticultural Society's garden at Wisley which was designed in 1914 and completed in 1916. The purpose-built, half-timbered, Surrey-style building known as the Laboratory is a focal point of Wisley and one of the first buildings seen on entering the gardens. It is also an early example of conservationism as the building was designed to be in keeping with the garden and was built using recycled materials from derelict properties.
