= Wrestle Angels =

Video game series

- Genres: Women's professional wrestling, bishōjo
- Developers: Great (Plum); KSS; Success; Tryfirst
- Publishers: Great; Imagineer; NEC Home Electronics; KSS; Success; Tryfirst
- Platforms: PC-9800 series, FM Towns, X68000, Super Nintendo Entertainment System, TurboGrafx-16, PlayStation 2
- First release: Wrestle Angels; February 15, 1992
- Latest release: Wrestle Angels: Survivor 2 November 6, 2008

Wrestle Angels (レッスルエンジェルス, Ressuru Enjerusu) is a Japanese women's professional wrestling video game series.

== Games ==
Title	Platform	Publisher(s)	Release date
Wrestle Angels	PC-9800 series, FM Towns	Great	February 15, 1992
Wrestle Angels 2: Top Eventer	PC-9800 series, FM Towns	Great	December 24, 1992
Wrestle Angels 3	PC-9800 series, FM Towns, X68000	Great	October 15, 1993
Wrestle Angels Special: Mou Hitori no Top Eventer	PC-9800 series, FM Towns, X68000	Great	February 10, 1994
Super Wrestle Angels	Super Nintendo Entertainment System	Imagineer	December 16, 1994
Wrestle Angels: Double Impact	TurboGrafx-16	NEC Home Electronics	May 19, 1995
Wrestle Angels V1	PC-9800 series	KSS	August 25, 1995
Wrestle Angels V2	PC-9800 series	KSS	December 22, 1995
Bishoujo Wrestler Retsuden: Blizzard Yuki Rannyuu!!	Super Nintendo Entertainment System	KSS	March 29, 1996
Wrestle Angels V3	PC-9800 series	KSS	May 24, 1996
Wrestle Angels: Survivor	PlayStation 2	Success	August 24, 2006
Wrestle Angels: Survivor 2	PlayStation 2	Tryfirst	November 6, 2008
