= Lainz Angels of Death =

Quartet of Austrian nurses convicted of serial murders

- Named after: Lainz
- Founding location: Vienna, Austria
- Years active: 1983–1989
- Membership: Maria Gruber, Irene Leidolf, Stephanija Meyer, and Waltraud Wagner
- Activities: Murdered (possibly 200+) patients

Maria Gruber, Irene Leidolf, Stephanija Meyer, and Waltraud Wagner were four Austrian women who worked as nurse's aides at the Geriatriezentrum am Wienerwald in Lainz, Vienna, and who murdered scores of patients between 1983 and 1989. The group killed their victims with overdoses of morphine or by forcing water into the lungs. By 2008, all four of the women had been released from prison.

== Background ==
Wagner, 23, was the first to kill a patient with an overdose of morphine in 1983. She discovered in the process that she enjoyed playing God and holding the power of life and death in her hands. She recruited Gruber, 19, and Leidolf, 21, and eventually the "house mother" of the group, 43-year-old Stephanija Meyer. Soon they had invented their own murder method: while one held the victim's head and pinched their nose, another would pour water into the victim's mouth until they drowned in their bed. Since elderly patients frequently had fluid in their lungs, it was an unprovable crime. The group killed patients who were feeble, but many were not terminally ill.

Investigators criticized the hospital for meeting them with "a wall of silence" as they attempted to look into a suspicious 1988 death. The aides were caught after a doctor overheard them bragging about their latest murder at a local tavern. In total, they confessed to 49 murders over six years but may have been responsible for as many as 200. In 1991, Wagner was convicted of 15 murders, 17 attempts, and two counts of assault. She was sentenced to life in prison. Leidolf received a life sentence as well, on conviction of five murders, while Meyer and Gruber received 20 years and 15 years respectively for manslaughter and attempted murder charges.

In 2008, the Justice Ministry in Austria announced that it would release Wagner and Leidolf from prison due to good behaviour. Mayer and Gruber had been released several years earlier and had assumed new identities. At the time, their freedom caused public anger in Austria. While most Austrians opposed capital punishment, many felt that the woman had not served enough time in prison for their crimes.
