= The Angel (game show) =

- Genre: Business game show
- Presented by: Amanda Byram
- Starring: John Caudwell (The Angel)
- Country of origin: United Kingdom
- Original language: English
- No. of series: 1
- No. of episodes: 5

Production
- Running time: 60 minutes (inc. adverts)
- Production company: Twofour

Original release
- Network: Sky1
- Release: 24 July – 21 August 2012

The Angel is a British business game show that was broadcast on Sky1 from 24 July to 21 August 2012. It was hosted by Amanda Byram and John Caudwell played the role of "The Angel".
