= Angell Woods =

Canadian forest

- Location within Montreal
- Interactive map of Angell Woods

Geography
- Location: Beaconsfield, Quebec, Canada
- Coordinates: 45°26′01″N 73°53′40″W
- Area: 85 ha (210 acres)

Administration
- Status: 57% privately owned, 43% publicly owned

Angell Woods is an old-growth forest in Beaconsfield, Quebec, Canada. It is bordered by Quebec Autoroute 20 to the south, Quebec Autoroute 40 to the north, an industrial park in Baie-D'Urfé to the west, and a residential subdivision to the east.

The Angell Woods are the only remaining old-growth forest as well as the largest wetland on the Island of Montreal.

On March 12, 2019 the Quebec Court of Appeal rejected an appeal by Yale Properties Inc. of the decision of Aug. 7, 2017. Aug. 7, 2017, Quebec Superior Court judge Johanne Mainville ruled that Yale Properties had not been able to demonstrate that the bylaw put in place by the Beaconsfield administration had stepped over the line as to be called disguised expropriation.

== Ownership ==
The woods cover approximately 85 hectares (210 acres) of land. Less than half of the woods are owned by the City of Beaconsfield, the Government of Quebec and the City of Montreal, while the majority has been privately owned since the 1950s, and is currently owned by a real estate developer.

Owner	Land Area
Yale Properties Ltd.	32.62 ha (80.6 acres)
Seda Holdings Ltd.	18.06 ha (44.6 acres)
City of Montreal	16.91 ha (41.8 acres)
Government of Quebec	9.38 ha (23.2 acres)
Montreal St. Patrick's Foundation	5.11 ha (12.6 acres)
City of Beaconsfield	4.1 ha (10 acres)
Association for the Protection of Angell Woods	2.56 ha (6.3 acres)
SZR Beaconsfield Inc.	2.01 hectares (5.0 acres)
Ducks Unlimited Canada	1.22 hectares (3.0 acres)
