= The Angel Hotel, Abergavenny =

Hotel in Abergavenny, Monmouthshire, Wales

Coordinates: 51.82124°N 3.01749°W

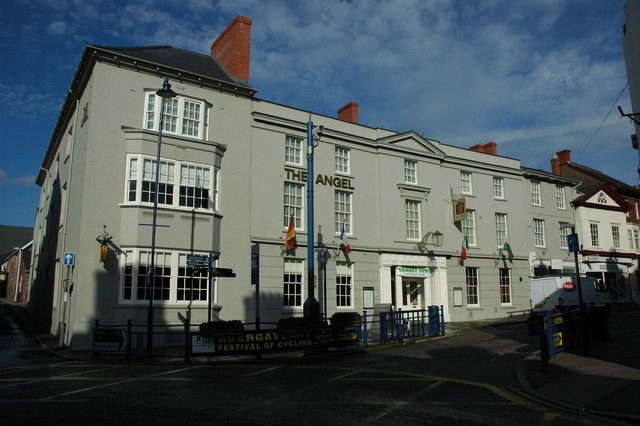
The Angel Hotel

The Angel Hotel is an AA 4-star Grade II listed hotel and inn at 15 Cross Street, in Abergavenny, Wales. It lies on the corner with Lower Castle Street and the main commercial street, Cross Street.

== History ==
During the Georgian period, The Angel served as a coaching inn. It dated to before 1736, as records indicate that a William Dunwoody passed it on to his son. The current building dates to later, mainly the early 19th century with a southeast wing probably of the late 18th century. An 1834 map reveals that there was once a carriageway through to the inn-yard at the central entrance, but by the early 20th century this had been altered, as shown in photographs of the period. During the 1830s, the Sovereign Light Coach service ran carriages back and forth daily from the Angel Hotel to Hereford, while the Mountaineer service ran from Merthyr Tydfil, through to Newport and the Angel Hotel, before going on to Worcester, Wolverhampton and Birmingham.

Renovations took place at the hotel in 1839. Later that year, the landlord, Charles Barrett, was found guilty under the Mutiny Act 1703 for failing to provide sufficient straw for two horses of the 12th Royal Lancers who were billeted at the hotel on 20 September. The landlord in 1840 is listed as a Thomas Morgan, who was succeeded by his son Vaughn Morgan in 1848. He had taken it on a three-year lease initially, but this was stretched out. Eventually, the owner of the land on which the hotel was located, Henry Somerset, 8th Duke of Beaufort, sold the property and Morgan continued as landlord under the new owner. In 1857, a Scotsman named Mr Mason took over as the landlord.

In September 1869 the hotel hosted the inaugural dinner ceremony of the Monmouthshire Polo Club.

The hotel became a Grade II listed building on 5 July 1952. In 1980–1, the hotel underwent a major renovation, with restructuring. Many of the furnishings date to that period, but several archways and dado panelling remain from earlier as does the main staircase, believed to be from the early 19th century.

Today The Angel is owned by the Griffiths family, who also run the Michelin-starred Walnut Tree restaurant in nearby Llanddewi Skirrid with Shaun Hill. It was voted AA Hotel of the year for Wales in 2016.

== Service ==
The hotel contains 34 rooms and two 2-bedroom cottages as of 2016, and has four conference rooms and a ballroom accommodating up to 180 people. The deluxe rooms of the hotel are fitted with designer Villeroy and Boch bathrooms.

The Angel is served by the Foxhunter Bar and the Oak Room restaurant, headed by chef Wesley Gregarious Lynford Hammond. As of 2016 it was one of only nine hotels outside London to be a part of the UK Tea Guild and host to "Afternoon Tea".

== Reception ==
The hotel is an AA 4-star hotel, with a restaurant which has been awarded an AA Rosette. In 2013, the hotel won the Award of Excellence from the Tea Guild's Top City and Country Hotel Awards. Fiona Duncan of The Daily Telegraph noted the "calm, stylish upstairs bedrooms with cream walls, snow-white beds dressed in pretty cashmere throws, quality brown furniture and smart bathrooms", awarding the hotel 8 out 10. The hotel was included in The Good Hotel Guide for 2016.
