= Mark Dawson (writer) =

English author

- Born: Lowestoft, Suffolk, England
- Occupation: Author
- Language: English
- Genre: Thriller

Mark Dawson is a British author. He writes the John Milton and Atticus Priest series of thriller and mystery novels.

== Personal life ==
Dawson was born and raised in Lowestoft, Suffolk, and studied law at Manchester University. Before becoming an author, he was a lawyer.

He lives in the Salisbury, Wiltshire area.

== Works ==
=== John Milton Series ===
1. The Cleaner (2013)
2. Saint Death (2013)
3. The Driver (2013)
4. Ghosts (2014)
5. The Sword of God (2014)
6. Salvation Row (2014)
7. Headhunters (2015)
8. The Ninth Step (2016)
9. The Jungle (2016)
10. Blackout (2017)
11. The Alamo (2017)
12. Redeemer (2018)
13. Sleepers (2018)
14. Twelve Days (2018)
15. Bright Lights (2019)
16. The Man Who Never Was (2020)
17. Killa City (2020)
18. Ronin (2020)
19. Never Let Me Down Again (2021)
20. Bulletproof (2021)
21. The Sandman (2021)
22. Uppercut (2023)
23. Bloodlands (2024)
24. Vultures (2025)
25. The Hanging Tree (2025)
26. Clearwater (2026)
27. Dope (to be released December 2026)

=== John Milton Novellas ===
0.5 1000 Yards (2013)
0.6 Tarantula (2014)

=== Beatrix Rose Series ===
Note: Book numbering appears to come from Goodreads and is not necessarily that of the publishers.

0.1-0.3. The Dragon and the Ghost (2019; previously published as Hong Kong Stories – Volume 1)
0A. Tempest (2019)
0B. Pistolero (2023)
1. In Cold Blood (2015)
2. Blood Moon Rising (2015)
3. Blood and Roses (2015)

=== Beatrix Rose Novellas ===
0.1 White Devil (2015)
0.2 Nine Dragons (2015)
0.3 Dragon Head (2015)

The above were originally published in the Hong Kong Stories – Volume 1 boxset and are now published as The Dragon and the Ghost novel.

3.5 Phoenix (2017)

=== Isabella Rose Series ===
1. The Angel (2015)
2. The Asset: Act II (2016)
3. The Agent (2017)
4. The Assassin (2018)
5. The Avenger (2022)
6. Pretty Face (2025)

=== Charlie Cooper Series ===
Not to be confused with the Charlie Cooper Mystery books by Deany Ray.

1. Sandstorm (2022)
2. The Chameleon (2023)
3. Blood Brothers (2024)
4. Dead of Winter (2024)
5. Code Blue (2024)
6. North Star (2024)
7. Collateral (2025)
8. Leverage (2025)
9. Burnout (2025)
10. Exposure (2025)
11. Heatwave (2026)
12. Hemlock (2026)
13. Terminal (2026)
14. Sanctuary (30 June 2026)

=== Group 15 Series ===
1. Scorpion (2017)
2. Witness X (2017)
3. Little Sister (2018)
4. The Vault (2020)
5. Wormwood (2022)

=== Soho Noir Thrillers ===
1. The Black Mile (2013)
2. The Imposter (2013)
.05 Gaslight (2014)

=== Standalone Novels ===
- The Art of Falling Apart (2001)
- Subpoena Colada (2001)

=== Atticus Priest Series ===
1. The House in the Woods (2020)
2. A Place to Bury Strangers (2021)
3. The Red Room (2023)
4. All the Devils Are Here (2024)
5. The Inheritance (2025)

=== The After-School Detective Club ===
1. The Case of the Smugglers Curse (2020)
2. The Secret of Ragnars Gold (2022)
3. The Mystery in the Marshes (2023)
4. The Case of the Dastardly Dognappers (2023)
5. The Legend of the Headless Horseman (2024)

== Sales figures for The Cleaner ==
In 2020, Dawson's book The Cleaner reached number 8 in the Hardback Fiction section of The Sunday Times' bestseller list after he purchased 400 copies of the book, seeing it to have previously been in position number 13. Nielsen BookScan initially approved the sales, believing them to have been part of a virtual book signing. The book was removed from the list and the list was recalculated after Dawson mentioned placing the order on his podcast The Self Publishing Show, his stated intention being to find overseas readers to purchase the book copies from him.
