= ¡Quiero Vivir! =

Studio album by Lilian Garcia
- Released: October 9, 2007
- Recorded: 2005–07
- Studio: Miami
- Genre: Latin pop
- Length: 46:16
- Language: Spanish
- Label: WWE; UMLE
- Producer: George Noriega; Tim Mitchell

¡Quiero Vivir! (transl. I Want to Live!) is the debut studio album by American ring announcer and singer Lilian Garcia. It was released on October 9, by WWE Music Group and Universal Music Latin Entertainment. The album is primarily a Spanish-language album within the genre of latin pop. It was produced by Tim Mitchell and George Noriega.

== Background ==
The idea for ¡Quiero Vivir! first emerged in 2005 after Garcia's performance of the United States national anthem in Spanish at WWE's New Year's Revolution. Following the performance, WWE chairman Vince McMahon suggested the concept of a Spanish-language album, which Garcia liked the idea of due to her being of Spanish and Puerto Rican heritage.

== Release and promotion ==
Recording took place in Miami with Latin pop producers Tim Mitchell and George Noriega. Garcia also collaborated on several tracks with Latin Grammy-winning artist Jon Secada, including two duets. Initial recording sessions were held separately, but later the two artists recorded together to finalize the tracks. Garcia co-wrote 11 of the album's 12 songs, and her family also contributed to the lyrics on some songs. Garcia performed the album's title track live on WWE's Raw on October 8, 2007, the day before the album's official release. She held a launch event at the Knitting Factory in New York City to promote the album and later appeared on television and radio programs. Garcia expressed her aim for ¡Quiero Vivir! to appeal to both Spanish-speaking and non-Spanish-speaking audiences.

== Track listing ==
No.	Title	Length
1.	"¡Quiero Vivir!"	3:12
2.	"Angel"	4:04
3.	"Adonde" (with Jon Secada)	4:00
4.	"Desenamorada"	3:58
5.	"Ya Veras"	4:20
6.	"Yo No Sé"	3:56
7.	"Estoy Endrogada"	3:33
8.	"Devastada"	3:32
9.	"Quiero Encontrarte"	4:04
10.	"Under In Love"	3:58
11.	"Where Did Love Go?" (with Jon Secada)	4:00
12.	"Que Seria"	3:44
