= Teen Angel =

Teen Angel may refer to:

== Film and TV ==
- Teen Angel (1989 TV series), a 1989 drama starring Jason Priestley
- Teen Angel (1997 TV series), a 1997 sitcom starring Corbin Allred
- "Teen Angel" (Cold Squad), a 2004 television episode
- Teen Angel, a one-scene character in Grease (see "Beauty School Dropout")

== Music ==
- Teen Angels (American band), 1994–1996
- Teen Angels, an Argentine pop music group

=== Songs ===
- "Teen Angel", a 1958 song by Dion and the Belmonts Singer, Patrick, Dimucci
- "Teen Angel" (song), a 1959 song performed by Mark Dinning, written by Red Surrey, Jean Surrey
- "Teen Angel", a 1968 song by Donovan, from The Hurdy Gurdy Man

== Comics ==
- Angel from the Time-displaced X-Men, referred to as such to distinguish him from the adult character

== See also ==
- Captain Caveman and the Teen Angels, a 1977 animated series starring Mel Blanc
- Teenangel, the alias for world record holder Roger Guy English
