= Guardian angel (disambiguation) =

A guardian angel is a spirit who is believed to protect and to guide a particular person.

Guardian angel(s) may also refer to:

== Churches and schools ==
- Holy Guardian Angels Church and Cemetery Historic District, listed on the National Register of Historic Places in Carroll County, Iowa, US
- Guardian Angels Church (Chaska, Minnesota), a Roman Catholic church and affiliated school in Chaska, Minnesota, U.S.
- Guardian Angel Cathedral, a Roman Catholic cathedral in Las Vegas, Nevada, U.S.
- Church of the Guardian Angel (Manhattan), in New York City
- Guardian Angel Parish School, a Manhattan school in the Roman Catholic Archdiocese of New York, U.S.
- Church of the Guardian Angel, in Wallis, Texas

== Literature ==
- Guardian Angel (comics) or Hop Harrigan, a fictional DC Comics character
- "Guardian Angel" (short story), a short story by Arthur C. Clarke
- Guardian Angel, a 2012 novel in Robert Muchamore's CHERUB series
- Guardian Angel, novel by Sara Paretsky

== Music ==
- "Guardian Angel" (Drafi Deutscher song), released under the band name of Masquerade, 1983
- "Guardian Angel" (K-System song), 2004
- Guardian Angel (album), a 1984 album by The Shadows
- "Guardian Angels" (Harpo Marx song), a 1945 song recorded by Mario Lanza
- "Guardian Angels" (The Judds song), a 1990 song by The Judds
- "Guardian Angel", a song by Abandon All Ships from Geeving
- "Guardian Angel", a song by Cinta Laura from Cinta Laura
- "Guardian Angel", a song by Juno Reactor from Beyond the Infinite
- "Guardian Angel", a song by the Vels from House of Miracles
- "Guardian Angel", a song by XXXTentacion from Skins
- Guardian Angel, a sub-label of the Dutch record label Basic Beat Recordings
- "Guardian Angel", a song by Carly Rae Jepsen from the 10th anniversary edition of her 2015 album Emotion

== Television and film ==
- The Guardian Angel (1934 film), a 1934 French comedy film
- The Guardian Angel (1942 film), a 1942 French comedy film
- Guardian Angel (TV series), a 2001 South Korean drama
- Guardian Angel (web series), a 2018–2019 Hong Kong insurance drama web series
- "Guardian Angel" (Diagnosis: Murder), an episode of Diagnosis: Murder
- "Guardian Angels" (House), an episode of House
- The Guardian Angel (1978 film) (L'Ange gardien), a Canadian film directed by Jacques Fournier
- Guardian Angel (1987 film) (Andjeo Cuvar), a Yugoslavian film directed by Goran Paskaljevic
- Guardian Angel (1994 film), an action-thriller drama starring Cynthia Rothrock
- Les Anges gardiens (Guardian Angels), a 1995 French crime-action comedy starring Gérard Depardieu
- The Guardian Angel (1990 film) (Skyddsängeln), a Swedish film directed by Suzanne Osten
- Guardian Angel (2014 film) (L'Ange gardien), a Canadian film directed by Jean-Sébastien Lord
- Murderous Trance, a 2018 psychological thriller also known as The Guardian Angel

== Other uses ==
- Angel Guardian (born 1998), Filipina actress and singer
- Guardian Angels, an international safety organization
- Guardian Angels, artworks by contemporary American artist Kris Neely
- Guardian Angel (wrestler), Ray Traylor, American professional wrestler (1963–2004)
- Holy Guardian Angel, an occult term
- Ida Nudel (born 1931), Israeli former refusenik and activist
