= Angel (British band) =

British glam rock band

- Origin: England
- Genres: Glam rock
- Years active: 1973–1975
- Label: Cube

Angel were a British glam rock band active from 1973 to 1975. They were managed and produced by The Sweet's Mick Tucker and Andy Scott for Cube Records. The band's first single was "Good Time Fanny". They also released the single "Little Boy Blue".
