= Death angel =

Death angel may refer to:

- Death-angel, common name for the herb Justicia pectoralis
- Amanita ocreata, a poisonous mushroom
- Death Angel, a thrash metal band from Concord, California
- Death Angels, a Nation of Islam splinter group involved in the Zebra murders
- B-9 Death Angel, a 1930s United States Army Air Corps bomber aircraft
- Death Angels (A Quiet Place), a fictional alien species
- Death Angels, nickname of United States Marine Corps squadron VMFA-235
- Nemesis 4: Death Angel, a 1996 American science fiction film
- Death Angel, a novel by Linda Fairstein
- Death's Angels, a novel by William King

== See also ==
- Angel of Death (disambiguation)
- Destroying angel (disambiguation)
- Personifications of death
