= Eye to Eye (Taher Shah song) =

Song by Taher Shah
- Released: April 2013
- Recorded: 2013
- Length: 4:58
- Songwriter: Taher Shah
- Producer: Taher Shah

Music video
- "Eye to Eye" on YouTube

"Eye to Eye" is a 2013 song and music video written and produced by, as well as starring Pakistani singer-songwriter Taher Shah. It was released in April 2013 and aired on various music channels in Pakistan and on YouTube. In June 2013 the song became popular on social media.

== Lyrics ==
According to Taher Shah, the song is about expressing and conveying feelings of love "eye to eye". The video of "Eye to Eye" features Shah, with his curly hair locks, dressed in a white suit with matching white shoes, against a white background with white furniture, where he sings about "sensational eyes, emotional eyes, colourful eyes, exciting eyes, fabulous eyes, spectrum eyes, human eyes, my eyes, your eyes..." etc.

== Music video ==
The music video, which gained notoriety for its unique English lyrics, shows Shah swaying side to side to the song while singing and blinking coyly at the screen. A duplicate of Shah, dressed in black with sleek hair, is also seen in the video, singing and swaying alongside the white-clad Shah. At one point in the video, the two Shahs share a short message: Eye to eye, makes epic era love, lifetime, once in a life. Substantial love is heaven for precise eyes. Spectacular eyes, our eyes, my eyes, and your eyes, eye to eye, eye to eye.

== Reviews ==
Shah was described as a musical 'genius' by the Pakistani newspaper The Express Tribune.

== In popular culture ==
Bollywood actor Hrithik Roshan dedicated the song to fellow actor Ranveer Singh on the latter's birthday in July 2015, posting a comment on Twitter: "One day I want you to outdo this!". Ranveer accepted the challenge and put up a 10-second dubsmash clip, syncing the song in Taher Shah getup. The clip garnered over 1.9 million views in just two days.
