= Destroying angel (disambiguation) =

A destroying angel is any of several closely related deadly species of Amanita mushrooms.

Destroying angel may also refer to:

== Religion ==
- Destroying angel (Bible), in various passages
- Destroying Angels, members of the Mormon Danites

== Books, film and television ==
- Destroying Angel (film), a 1923 American silent film directed by W. S. Van Dyke
- Destroying Angel, a 1987 Anglo-Yugoslavian film directed by Arne Mattsson, later retitled Sleep Well My Love
- "The Destroying Angel," a 1976 gay pornographic film directed by Peter De Rome and based loosely on Edgar Allan Poe's "William Wilson."
- "Destroying Angel" (Midsomer Murders), a 2001 television episode
- "Destroying Angel" (Van der Valk), a 1972 television episode
- Destroying Angel, a science fiction novel by Richard Paul Russo

== Songs ==
- "Destroying Angel", a song by Sneaker Pimps from Splinter
- "The Destroying Angel", a song by Anaal Nathrakh from Eschaton
- "Destroying Angels" (song), a song by Garbage with John Doe and Exene Cervenka of X

== See also ==
- Angel of Death (disambiguation)
- Angel of Destruction, a film
- Avenging Angel (disambiguation)
- Death angel (disambiguation)
