= Thomas Hammond =

Thomas, Tommy, or Tom Hammond may refer to:

- Thomas Hammond (regicide) (c. 1600–1658), officer in the New Model Army and a regicide
- Thomas Hammond (merchant) (1630–1681), English-born Norwegian merchant and landowner
- Thomas Hammond (Maryland politician) (1790–1874), American politician from Maryland
- Thomas Hammond (Indiana politician) (1843–1909), U.S. Representative from Indiana
- T. C. Hammond (Thomas Chatterton Hammond, 1877–1961), Irish Anglican cleric
- Thomas Hammond (athlete) (1878–1945), British track and field athlete
- Thomas S. Hammond (1883–1950), American business and political leader, soldier and football player and coach
- Tom Hammond (footballer) (1896–1966), Australian rules footballer for Collingwood
- Tom Hammond (born 1944), American sportscaster
- Thomas Hammond (field hockey) (born 1984), South African field hockey player
- Tommy Hammond, South African field hockey player

== See also ==
- Tom Hammonds (born 1967), American professional basketball player and drag racer
