= Morten Lyng Lossius =

Norwegian military officer and engineer

Morten Lyng Lossius (1819–1892) was a Norwegian military officer, engineer and politician.

He hailed from Hemne, and was the son of Captain Johan S. Lossius. He was a descendant of Lorentz Lossius, who migrated to Norway from Göttingen in the 17th century and became the first director of Røros Copper Works. He married Inger Marie Holtermann in 1845. He was the father of Knud H. Lossius, praeses of the Royal Norwegian Society of Sciences and Letters.

Morten Lyng Lossius took military education, reached the rank of lieutenant in 1840, and then had parallel careers in the military and engineering. He studied the latter field at the Polytechnical Institute in Copenhagen. He was the director of public road works north of Dovrefjell, and headed the construction of the Trondhjem–Støren Line, which opened in 1864. He retired from engineering in 1874, and served as mayor of Strinda Municipality from 1878 to 1881. He lived at Lade Mansion, which he inherited from his father-in-law in 1858. In his military career, he reached the rank of captain in 1857, major in 1874 and colonel in 1880.

He held the Royal Norwegian Order of St. Olav and the Knight Cross of the Order of Vasa and Order of the Sword. A road in Trondheim has been named after him.
