= Johan von Mangelsen =

- Born: 12 September 1694; Halden, Norway
- Died: 24 February 1769 (aged 74)
- Occupation(s): Military officer and businessperson
- Relatives: Sara Hammond (mother-in-law)

Johan von Mangelsen (12 September 1694 – 24 February 1769) was a Norwegian military officer and businessperson. He was born in Berg (current Halden), and was married to Cathrine Bugball, a daughter of Sara Hammond. He was Norways's principal representative at the border negotiations with Sweden between 1743 and 1751. He was promoted to the rank of lieutenant general in 1758. Through his marriage, Mangelsen became a significant shareholder of the Røros Copper Works, and took actively part in the business.
