= Lorentz Mortensen Angell =

Norwegian merchant and landowner

Lorentz Mortensen Angell (9 March 1626 – 30 July 1697) was a merchant and landowner in Norway.

He was born at Angeln east of Flensburg in Southern Schleswig. Around 1650, he settled in Trondheim when many merchants and traders from Flensburg were taking part in the fishing trade along the Norwegian coast. He built up a considerable fortune as a merchant and ship owner. He was co-owner of Røros Copper Works and significant landowner with numerous farms in Nordland county including Tjøtta estate (Tjøttagodset) on the island Tjøtta in what is now Alstahaug Municipality. In 1675, after the death of Joachim Irgens von Westervick he bought his properties in Helgeland.

== Personal life ==
Angell was married three time. In 1653, he married Margrethe Hansdatter Puls (1631–1670). She died in 1670 after giving birth to six sons, five of whom survived to adulthood. In 1671, he married Abel Jespersdatter (1651–1683). She died in 1683 after giving birth to ten children, six of whom survived to adulthood. In 1684, he married Margrethe Pedersdatter who died in 1713. They had a daughter. He was the father of Hans Angell (1658–1728) and Albert Angell (1660–1705). He was the grandfather of Thomas Angell.

== See also ==
- Angell (family)
