= Knut H. Lossius =

Norwegian educator

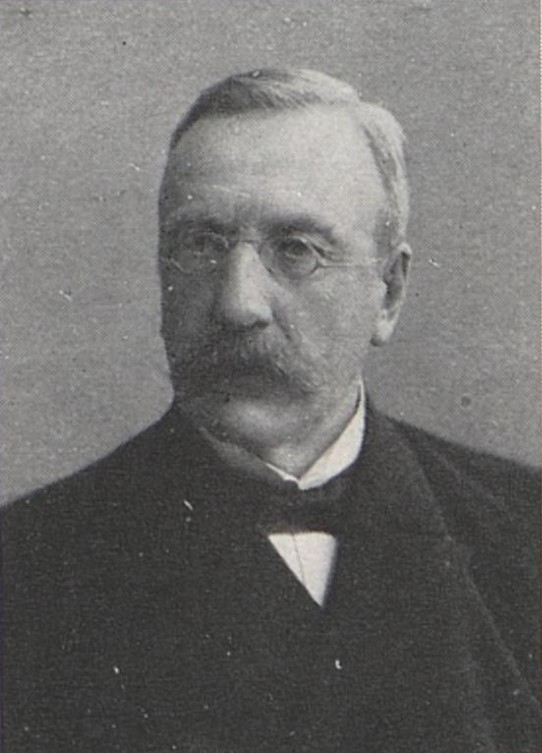
Knut H. Lossius

Knut Henrik Holtermann Lossius (23 September 1847 – 9 March 1915) was a Norwegian educator and archaeologist.

He was born in 1847 as the son of Morten Lyng Lossius from Lade in Trondhjem, and was named after his maternal grandfather Knud H. Holtermann. He was a descendant of Lorentz Lossius, who migrated to Norway from Göttingen in the 17th century and became the first director of Røros Copper Works.

He served as headmaster of Trondhjem Cathedral School, and served as praeses of the Royal Norwegian Society of Sciences and Letters from 1899 to 1902. Lossius received the Order of St. Olav in 1912. Lossiusvegen in Trondheim is named after him.

Academic offices
Preceded by Johannes Sejersted	Praeses of the Royal Norwegian Society of Sciences and Letters; 1899–1902	Succeeded by Bjarne Lysholm
