= Albert Angell =

Norwegian civil servant

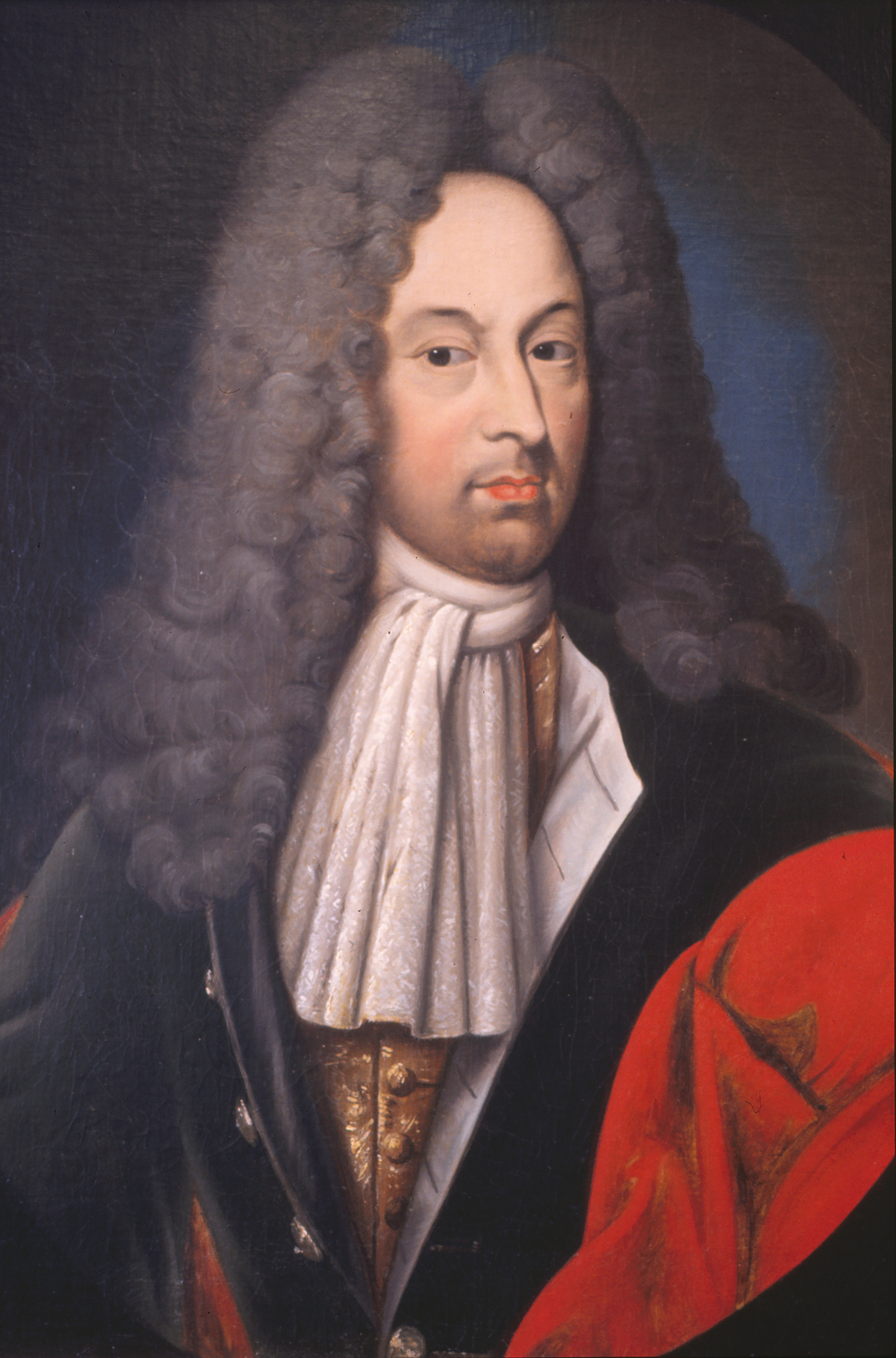
- Angell painting from the Urban Antiquities slide collection.
- Born: 4 November 1660; Trondheim, Norway
- Died: 13 September 1705 (aged 44)
- Occupations: Civil servant, landowner and businessman
- Spouse: Sara Hammond
- Children: Thomas Angell
- Parent: Lorentz Mortensen Angell
- Relatives: Thomas Hammond (father-in-law)

Albert Angell (4 November 1660 – 13 September 1705) was a civil servant, landowner and businessman. He served as Mayor of Trondheim, Norway.

== Biography ==
Angell was born in Trondheim, Norway. He was the son of merchant and landowner Lorentz Mortensen Angell (1626–1697) and Margrethe Hansdatter Puls (1631–1670). He was enrolled as a student at the University of Copenhagen in 1678 but did not graduate. Albert Angell acquired several sawmills and became one of the largest lumber dealers in Trondheim. He was also the owner of large forest and land properties, and had shares in the Røros Copper Works.

== Personal life ==
He was married in 1689 to Sara Hammond who was the daughter of Thomas Hammond, a timber merchant originally from England. She inherited agricultural and forestry properties and sawmills from parents. They had nine children, four of whom survived to adulthood, including endowment founder Thomas Angell.
