= Jacob de Petersen =

Danish and Brunswijker courtier (1622–1704)

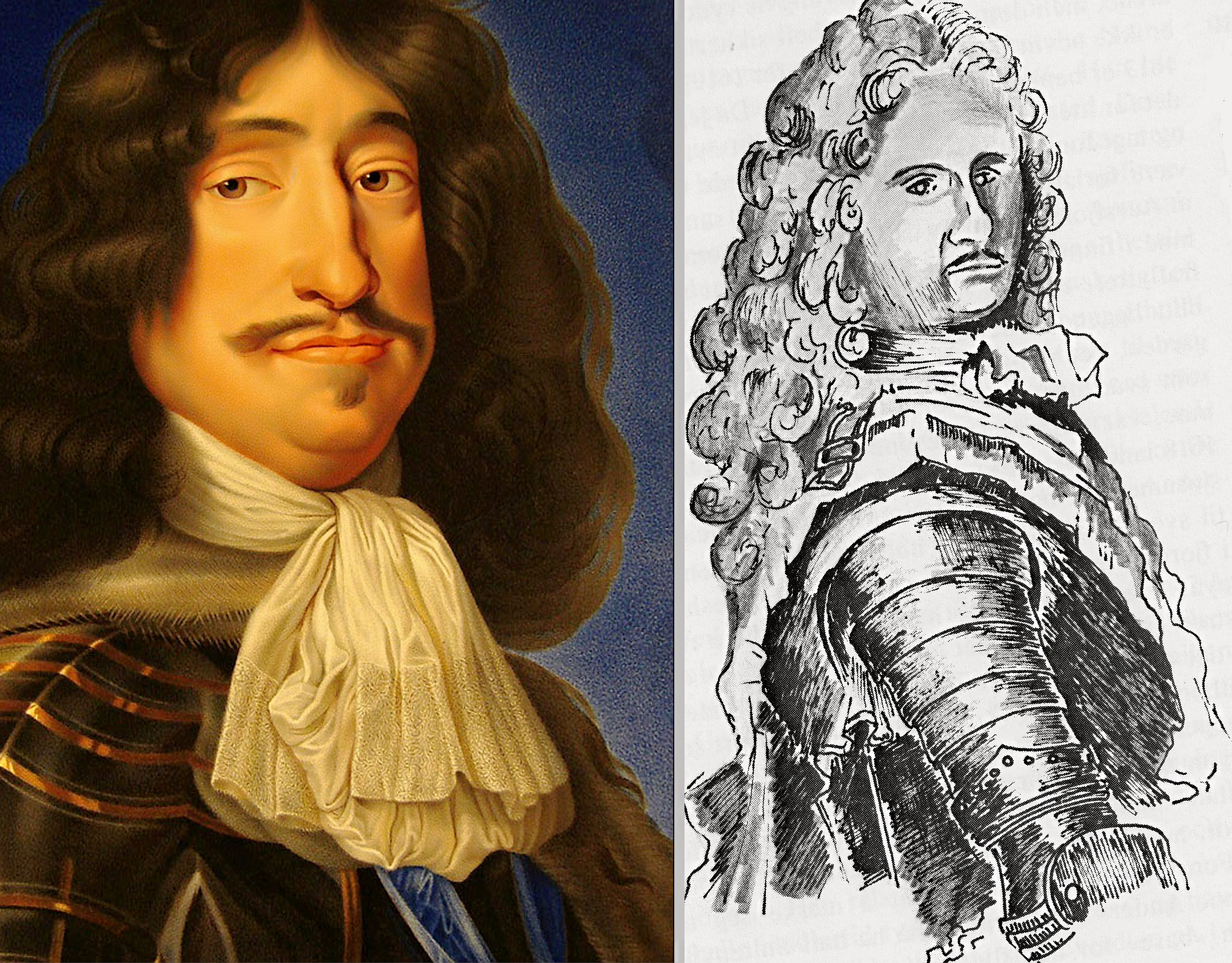
Jacob (de) Petersen (right), the king's darling of Frederick III of Denmark and Norway (left)

Jacob, Count Palatine and Baron de Petersen (before ennoblement Jacob Petersen) (born 26 September 1622 in Rendsburg; died 26 October 1704 in Leusden) was a Danish and Brunswijker courtier, politician and diplomat. He wore the dignity of Count Palatine (Comes Palatinus), imperial Baron, Lord of Engelenburg, Aschat and the house of Heiligenberg. At the end of the 17th century, De Petersen became the largest landowner in Northern Norway through inheritance.

== Life ==
=== Denmark-Norway ===
De Petersen's ancestors lived in Rendsburg, he himself is regarded as the ancestor of the imperial barons De Petersen who emigrated to the Netherlands. He was born under the name Petersen as son of unknown parents. After his tailoring apprenticeship, Petersen came into contact with Frederik Ahlefeldt, the later Grand Chancellor, whom he accompanied as a valet on his travels through Europe in 1647–53. In May 1654, during the court stay in Flensburg, Ahlefeldt was appointed chief valet, and it was apparently he who employed Petersen as a valet to the king Frederick III of Denmark and Norway before May 1655. In 1658, during the Swedish-Danish War, he was in Lübeck to issue one loan for the king and the other one for privateers. At the beginning of his career Petersen officially acted as the king's senior valet and secret valet, later as the king's chamberlain. After the coup d'état in 1660, he was described by a foreign envoy as the king's "darling", but he was particularly in the favor of Queen Sophie Amalie, to whom he was attached as "secret chamberlain". Politically, he played a major role in those years within the Queen's party, which included men like Hannibal Sehested.

Jacob Petersen belonged to the influential circle around Sehested, Ahlefeldt, Hans Svane, Peter Bülche and Theodor Lente, who became increasingly opposed to Frederick III's favorite Christoffer Gabel. Sehested called Petersen in a letter in 1662 as a "respected, particularly trusted, valued friend". Petersen was a factotum in terms of wardrobe and party arrangements and appeared in 1663 as court knight of the queen at the end of the ring at the Electoral Saxon presentation. He also assisted with her various installations in Dronninggård and the construction of the Princess Courtyard in Frederiksborg. In return for his services he was given the Østrup estate by Lake Esrum. In 1663 Petersen received a royal charter with the coat of arms of the southern Jutland noble family Von Petersen, also known as Von Dedens, to whom he was hardly related. Gabel's appointment as privy councilor and governor of Copenhagen in August 1664 spelled defeat for the queen and her circle, who had campaigned for Sehested to become prime minister. Probably fearing Gabel's revenge, Petersen, who had just been appointed as Gabel's successor as councillor, left Copenhagen in November on the pretext of a health trip. Petersen was unspecifically accused of being involved in "many intrigues".

=== Netherlands ===
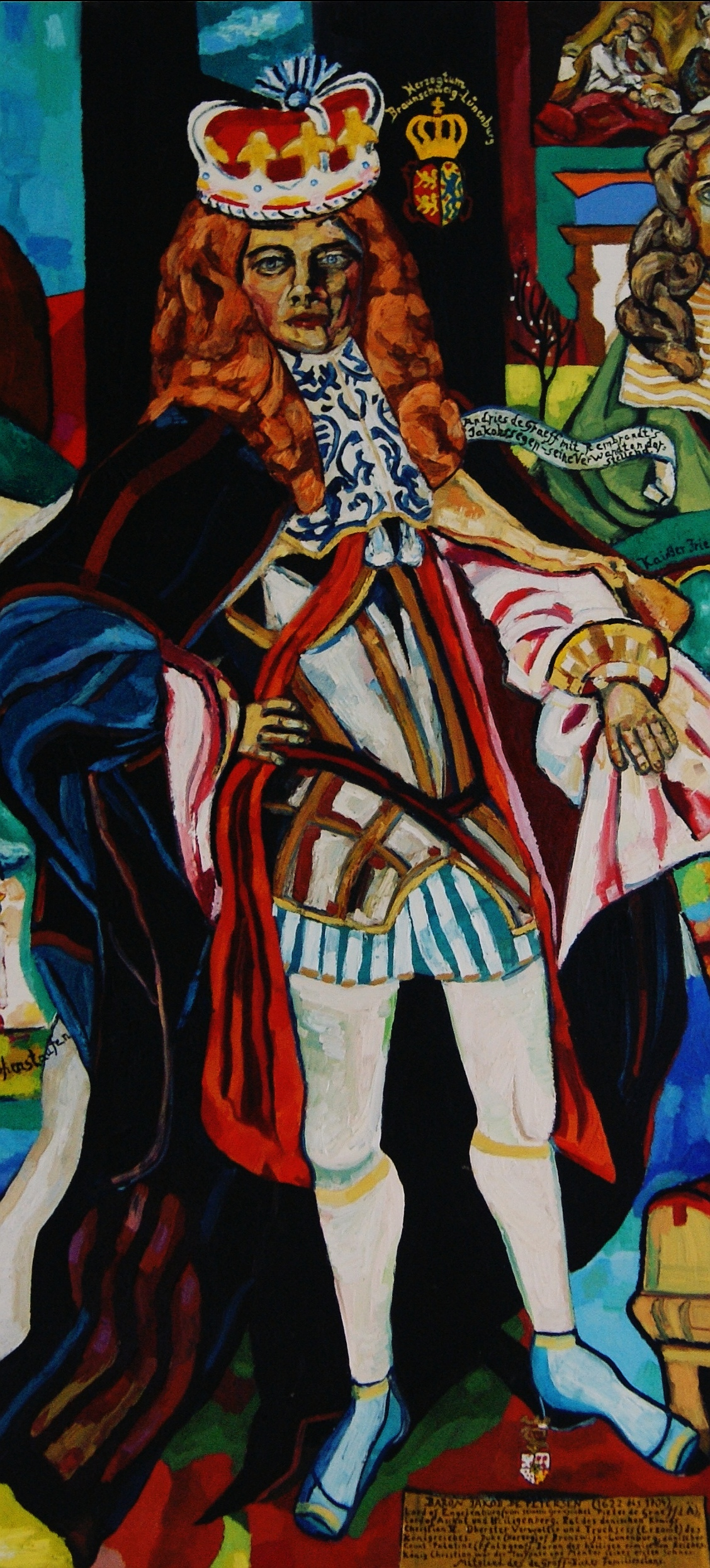
Jacob de Petersen (detail of a historical-allegorical painting from Matthias Laurenz Gräff, 2007)

Coat of arms De Petersen

Jacob Petersen sought refuge with the Dukes of Brunswick, the Queen's brothers, sought their intercession in vain, and then settled in The Hague, where he became ducal commissioner in The Netherlands end of 1664. Later he was appointed general commissioner, councillor, Minister-Resident (a sort of Ambassador) and political agent of Rudolph Augustus, Duke of Braunschweig-Wolfenbüttel in the Netherlands. He was also a canon at the Oud-Munster in Utrecht.

In 1669 Petersen married Catharina Bicker, Lady of Engelenburg (1642–1678), daughter of the knight Jacob Bicker (1612–1676) and Alida Bicker (a daughter of Andries Bicker). She may have introduced her eponymous cousin, a daughter of Andries Bicker, to Joachim Irgens von Westervick, the owner of several copper mines near Røros (Norway) and owner of the private Irgens Estate, which was huge part of Northern Norway. Afterwards Bicker get married by Irgens von Westerwich, and Irgens and Petersen become cousins-in-law.

As Frederik III. died in 1670 Queen Sophie Amalie dropped all charges against Petersen and when Gabel fell out of favor soon, Ahlefeldt had Petersen's sentence overturned because of his illegal stay abroad, his marriage and other crimes. The entire trial was erased from the court record. In 1675, Petersen tried unsuccessfully to get to Copenhagen through Peder Schumacher Griffenfeld. Perhaps the new King and his circle also feared his influence, for he still had friends in the highest offices. This was shown by the fact that his sons, who were baptized in Utrecht in 1674 and 1675, almost all had godparents from the Danish royal family, supplemented by his old friends Hans Schack and Frederik Ahlefeldt. The couple Jacob Petersen and Catharina Bicker had seven children, all of whom grew up in Utrecht, including his heir Jacob de Petersen. He operated Financial transactions in connection with Irgens von Westervick. Emperor Leopold I appointed him and his descendants Imperial barons De Petersen on 18 November 1676. The highest honor was the Palatinate, the title of Count Palatine, the title Wohlgeboren, the perpetual right to court at the Viennese Imperial Court and the right to inherit courtiers. That Was at the time when the Emperor, who needed money to pay his mercenary army, granted more titles for money. As a result, De Petersen's 2nd cousin Pieter de Graeff wrote a paper on the older genealogy of his family.

De Petersen was a wealthy man and owned the manor house De Heiligenberg in the Lordship of Asschat (Leusden), where he spent the summers and an estate near 's-Graveland. He spent the winters at the Janskerkhof in Utrecht. He was, also as a catholic, the biggest supporter for the construction of the Evangelical Lutheran Church in Amersfoort. The sacrament silver, in 1914 in use, with his coat of arms and initials was donated by him to the church.

== Large landowner in Norway ==
When Petersen's cousin-in-law Joachim Irgens von Westervick died in 1675, his estate was bankrupt and his widow, Cornelia Bicker, entered into multi-creditor proceedings. Lawspeaker Gjert Lange, who had been the manager of Irgens Estate, had a lien on all properties in North Troms, a total of about 120 company numbers and 80 to 90 fin spacings. Lange mortgaged the property in the years 1686–1705. By a Supreme Court ruling in 1705, Cornelia Bicker regained control of the estate by repurchasing Lange, and the sum was allegedly provided by Jacob de Petersen. De Petersen had also registered his claims to the estate by reference to a mortgage deed from 1677, but his heirs did not become owners of the Tromsø Estate until 1713. A Hans Graa managed this part of the estate around 1680, then Andreas Tønder in the years 1690–1710, and after him came Carsten Andersen Bernhoft. Also in Helgeland, Jacob de Petersen became the owner of some estates after Irgens von Westerwick a total of approx. 80 farm number. In addition, it came with a whole lot of tithes, management, patchwork tax, hunting trips, as well as sightings and cases. Bailiff Peder Christophersen Broch was for a time trustee for this part of De Petersen's estate. De Petersen himself apparently had no intention of becoming a landowner in northern Norway. He never set foot on Norwegian soil, and strangely enough, he never acquired a deed to the properties either.

== Literature ==
- Opmerkingen over de geslachten behandeld in Nederland's Adelsboek. 1949, p 127
- Van Kamerheer tot Binnenmoeder, De Rijksbaronen De Petersen in de Nederlanden 1550-1914. Resumé van de vcordracht van 23 januari 1995 door Dr. M.R. Doortmont (Amersfoort en Omstreken. Uitgave van de Nederlandse Genealogische Vereniging Afdeling Amersfoort en Omstreken. Jaargang 4, April 1995, Nummer 2)
- Matthias Laurenz Graeff: Jacob de Petersen (1622-1704). Leben im 17. Jahrhundert im Spannungsfeld zwischen Fürstendienst und internationalen Handelsunternehmungen, 2026
