= Jacob Peterson =

Jacob Peterson may refer to:

- Jacob Peterson (soccer) (born 1986), American soccer forward
- Jacob Peterson (ice hockey) (born 1999), Swedish ice hockey forward

== See also ==
- Jacob de Petersen (1622–1704), Danish and Brunswijker courtier, politician, and diplomat
- Jacob Petersen, American musician, guitarist for the Steve Miller Band
