= List of the largest landowners of Norway =

List of big landowners in Norway includes persons as well as private and public companies owning at least 100 square kilometers (39 sq mi) of land in Norway. The Government of Norway is, directly and indirectly, by far the largest landowner in the Kingdom. State-owned land is managed by Statskog, while a large portion was spun off to the Finnmark Estate. In Svalbard, the land is owned directly by the Minister of Trade and Industry as well as by several mining companies. The largest private owner on the mainland is Meraker Brug, which is owned by the Astrup family. Several larger landowners are commons (Norwegian: allmenning) and municipalities.

== List ==
The following is a list of all owners of minimum 100 square kilometers (39 sq mi) of land in Norway. It lists the name of the owner, the location in which the owning institution is registered, the area of land, the ultimate owner of the land, and the owner's sector.

List of the largest landowners of Norway
Owner	Based in	Area (km^{2})	Area (sq mi)	Ultimate owner	Sector	Ref
Statskog	Namsos	60,000	23,000	Government of Norway	State	
Ministry of Trade and Industry (Note: The ministry owns 95.2% of Svalbard directly.)	Oslo	59,782	23,082	Government of Norway	State	
Finnmark Estate	Lakselv	46,000	18,000	Finnmark County Municipality and Sami Parliament	Public	
Skjåk Almenning	Skjåk	2,106	813	—	Commons	
Store Norske Spitsbergen Kulkompani	Longyearbyen	2,006	775	Government of Norway	State	
Norwegian Defence Estates Agency	Oslo	1,441	556	Government of Norway	State	
Meraker Brug	Meråker	1,330	510	Astrup family	Private	
Værdalsbruket	Verdal	900	350	Storebrand	Private	
Opplysningsvesenets fond	Oslo	875	338	Government of Norway/Church of Norway	State	
Namdal Bruk	Trones	713	275	Ola Mæle and Øystein Stray Spetalen	Private	
Ulvig Kiær	Grong	700	270	Anne Kristin Ulvig and Anders Kiær	Private	
Plahtes Eiendommer	Terråk	675	261	Frithjof Møinichen Plahte	Private	
Oppdal Bygdealmenning	Oppdal	650	250	—	Commons	
Trysil Kommuneskoger	Trysil	640	250	Trysil Municipality	Municipal	
Treschow-Fritzøe	Larvik	615	237	Mille-Marie Treschow	Private	
Firma Albert Collett	Bangsund	570	220	Trygve Johan Collett Ebbing	Private	
Løvenskiold-Vækerø	Oslo	433	167	Carl Otto Løvenskiold	Private	
Thomas Angells Stiftelser	Trondheim	400	150	—	Foundation	
Mathiesen Eidsvold Værk	Hurdal	350	140	Haaken Eric Mathiesen	Private	
Maarfjell	Atrå	340	130		Private	
Løvenskiold-Fossum	Skien	330	130	Leopold Axel Løvenskiold	Private	
Mathiesen-Atna	Skien	330	130	Christian Pierre Mathiesen	Private	
Kings Bay	Ny-Ålesund	295	114	Government of Norway	State	
Arktikugol	Barentsburg	251	97	Government of Russia	Public	
Espedalen Bygdealmenning	Vinstra	251	97	—	Commons	
Pihl	Mesnali	250	97		Private	
Romedal Almenning	Vallset	245	95	—	Commons	
Cappelen Holding	Ulefoss	227	88	Carl Diderik Cappelen	Private	
Kiær Mykleby	Koppang	225	87	Anders Kiær	Private	
Løiten Almenning	Løiten	225	87	—	Commons	
Vang Almenning	Løten	225	87	—	Commons	
Ogndalsbruket	Steinkjer	220	85	Steinkjer Municipality	Municipal	
Austre Adventfjord	Bergen	217	84	Horn family	Private	
Stangeskovene	Aurskog	215	83	Christen Sveaas 28%, and others	Private	
Opdal Renkompani	Uvdal	206	80		Private	
Stor-Elvdal Kommuneskoger	Koppang	200	77	Stor-Elvdal Municipality	Municipal	
Bjørnøen	Ny-Ålesund	178	69	Government of Norway	State	
Gran Almenning	Løten	177	68	—	Commons	
Oslo Municipality	Oslo	166	64	Oslo Municipality	Municipal	
Kistefos Træsliberi	Dokka	160	62	Christen Sveaas	Private	
Laagefjeld Sameie	Rauland	146	56	Hermansen family	Private	
Brandbu og Tingelstad Almenning	Jaren	140	54	—	Commons	
Aall Ulefos	Ulefoss	130	50	Niels Cato Beckett Aall	Private	
Buskerud Landbruksselskap	Drammen	125	48		Private	
Stange Almenning	Vallset	125	48	—	Commons	
Furnes Almenning	Brumunddal	116	45	—	Commons	
Kasa og Strand Sameige	Øye	114	44		Private	
Leksvik Bygdeallmenning	Leksvik	100	39	—	Commons	

== See also ==
- List of Norwegian estates

== Notes and references ==
Notes

Bibliography

- Aune, Tormod (1995). Hilsen Nord-Trøndelag (in Norwegian). Namsos: Trønderbok. ISBN 82-993613-0-3.
