= Sara Hammond =

Norwegian landowner and businesswoman (1672–1716)

- Born: 1672; Trondheim, Norway
- Died: 1716 (aged 43–44)
- Occupations: Land owner and businesswoman
- Spouse: Albert Angell
- Children: Thomas Angell
- Parent: Thomas Hammond

Sara Hammond (1672 – May 1716) was a Norwegian landowner and businesswoman. She and her husband, Albert Angell, were prominent traders in Trondheim during its economic boom during the 17th-century.

== Life ==
Sara Thomasdatter Hammond was born in 1672 in Trondheim to Elisabeth Sommerschild (died 1682) and Thomas Hammond (1630–1681), a merchant who emigrated from England. Hammond's maternal grandfather had also emigrated from England. Her father died when she was 9, followed by her mother one year and she inherited a significant fortune and business properties. As a result, a guardian was appointed to care for her inherited assets, while Hammond was placed in her older sister Elisabeth's household, who was married to Morten Lorentzen Angell.

In 1689, at the age of 17, she married Albert Angell, a civil servant, landowner, and mine owner, who was her brother-in-law's younger brother. Together they had 9 children, however, only four survived infancy, including Thomas Angell. Hammond's inheritance from her parents, including a sawmill and other agricultural and forestry properties, was used as a foundation of the couple's business ventures. Her husband also later became the Mayor of Trondheim.

Albert Angell died in 1705 from gangrene in his feet, leaving Hammond widowed with five young children. She took over the administration of the family business, which included ownership of 29 out of 172 shares of the Røros Copper Works, forests, sawmills, and land properties in Selbu, Strinda and Høylandet. However, during her husband's probate, a dispute with Hammond and her siblings arose, as they were unhappy that Angell had been responsible for collecting debts in her parents' estates. Hammond addressed her brother's claims point by point and counter-claimed against them, arguing that they "should rather have helped me and my fatherless to justice, than by such dishonourable and inexplicable pretensions to weigh down my dignity and grief".

In 1709, she married for the second time to merchant and city manager Søren Bygball, who was also involved with the Røros Copper Works, and had two more children with him. Hammond died seven years later in May 1716 in Trondheim.
