= Angell (family) =

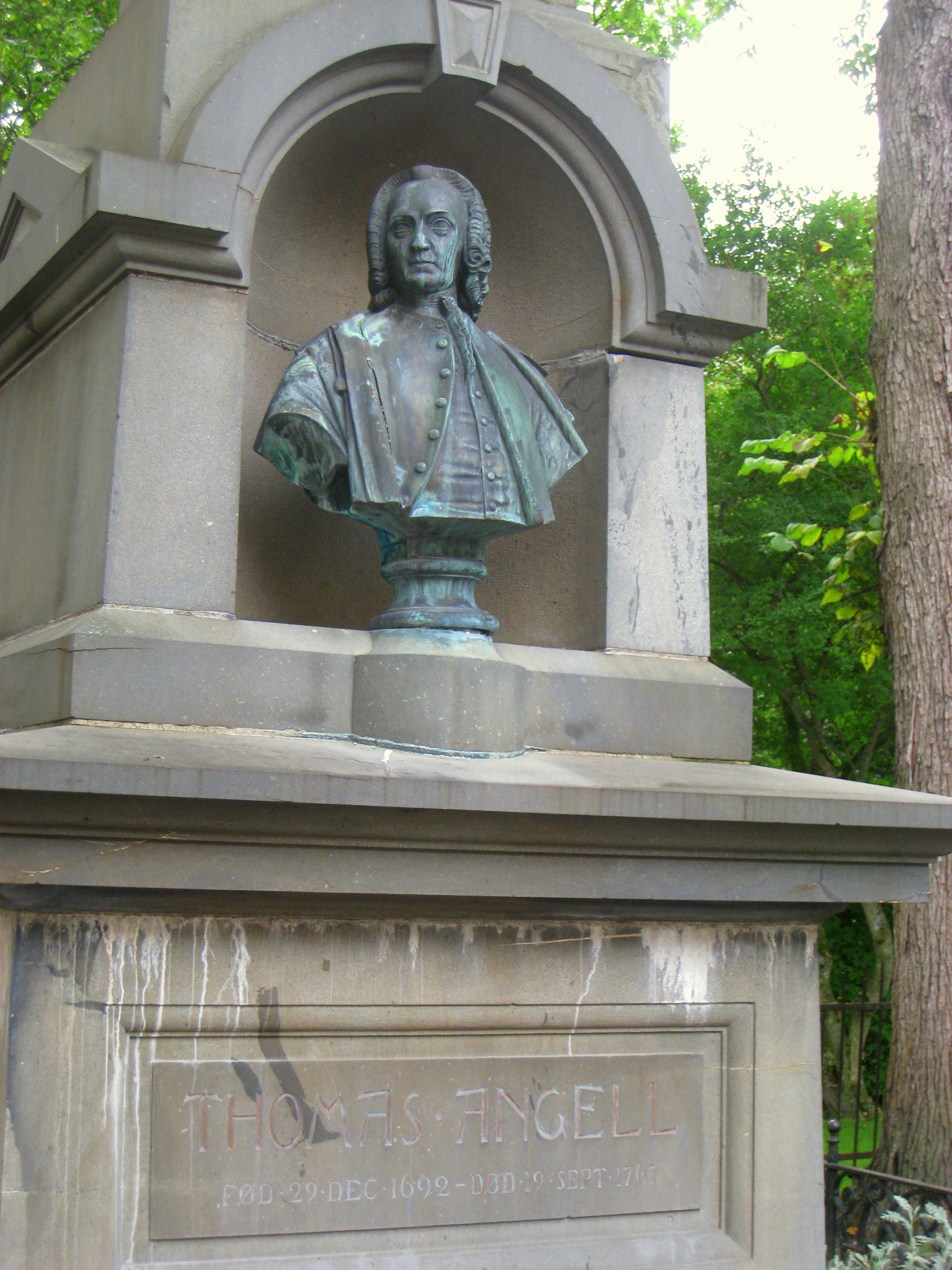
Bust of Thomas Albertsen Angell.

Angell is a family in Norway. In the 1650s the family came as merchants to Trondheim, where they took their current name. From there parts of the family entered the proprietarian aristocracy in Central und Northern Norway. The part of the family which remained in Trondheim gained a prominent position still visible in the city today, especially through the Thomas Angell Foundations, one of the biggest landowners in Trøndelag and among other activities running the charity Thomas Angell House.

The name in both England and the USA derives from "DeAngeli", an Italian name from Trento in the Lombardy region. Roger DeAngeli came over to England in 1485 to fight as a mercenary for Henry Tudor at Bosworth. His son Robert changed his name to the Anglicised "Angell" when Henry VIII broke with Rome, to lose the Roman Catholic connection. The family rose to prominence with key posts in local and national affairs throughout the next 200 years, notably Sir Thomas John Angell in the mid 1500s. The family seat was at Peakirk in Northamptonshire, although many family members ended up in Chippenham in Wiltshire and also Cambridgeshire later. John Angell (Chippenham) died in 1702 and bequeathed land for St. John's church, St. John's school and local housing in Brixton. The church and school are still there, the current Bishop of Croydon Dr. Rosemarie Mallett was the vicar at the church previously. The residential area is now the notorious "Angell Town" Estate, featured in David Cohen's article in the London Evening Standard some years ago. with all birth/death certificates and profile information.

Family motto "I stand in the track of my ancestors"

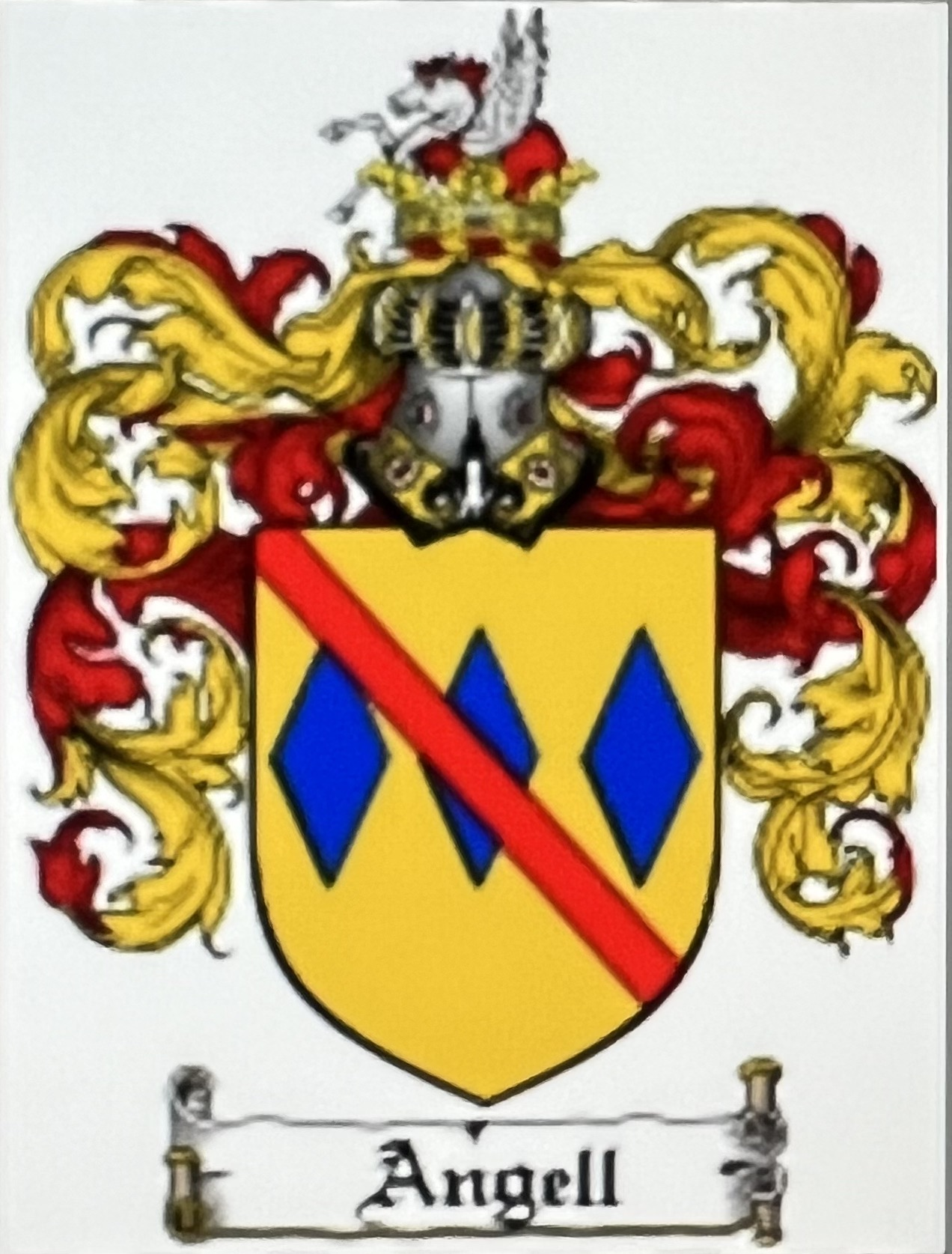
The Angell Family Coat of Arms

== Name and coat of arms ==
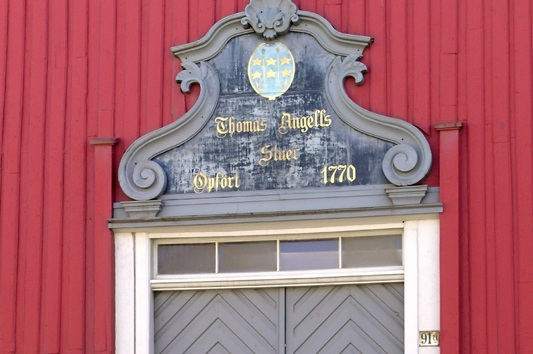
The Angell coat of arms.

The Norwegian name derives from Angel, the Danish variant of the landscape Angeln in today's Germany. In Norway the name was interpreted as angel, i.e. a fishhook. Hence the family arms: Between and on each of the outer sides of two fishhooks: a vertically ordered pair of five-pointed stars (note: photo within this article)

== Origin and immigration ==
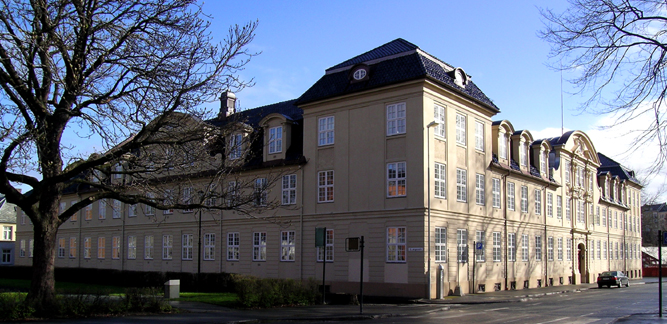
Thomas Angell's House in Trondheim.

The family came from the Nordgård Estate in Steinberg, Angeln. Possible relations to the family von Deden, who were the previous possessors of this estate, have been suggested, but remain unproven. Morten Pedersen and Anne Pedersdatter to Nordgård had the children Peter Mortensen († 1684), who took over the Nordgård Estate, Maren Mortensdatter († 1664), Morten Mortensen (1624–1688), and Lorentz Mortensen (1626–1697). Lorentz Mortensen established himself as a merchant in Flensburg. In the 1650s he and his siblings Morten and Maren, as well as their father, came by ship to Trondheim.

== Business and land estate ==
=== Business ===
In Norway Lorentz Mortensen Angell continued his profession as a merchant. Angell was involved also in shipping as well as in fisheries and whaling. Hereto he established connections with the main owner of the Røros Copperwork, Joachim Irgens (von Westerwick).

Morten Mortensen Angell was, like his younger brother, a merchant in Trondheim.

=== Land estate ===
When Joachim Irgens von Westerwick died he owed Lorentz Angell a bigger amount of money. As a payment Angell received big parts of the Irgens Estate. 487 farms in Helgeland, with a size of 525 våg, were transferred to Angell, thereafter being known as the Angell Estate. Angell later bought the Smøla Estate and collected several of farms in Trøndelag.

From Cornelia Irgens von Westerwick, the latter's widow, Angell received 53 of the 180 owner parts in the Røros Copperwork. He had not actively intended to become an owner of the copperwork, but accepted to receive the parts so that the widow should manage to cover her debt to him.

== Literature ==
- Norsk biografisk leksikon: Lorentz Mortensen Angell at snl.no.
- Thomas Angell Foundations: Velkommen til Thomas Angells Stiftelser, Thomas Angells Hus i Trondheim
- Hans Cappelen: Norske Slektsvåpen (Norwegian Family Coats of Arms) with an English Summary, Oslo 1969, p. 52
