= Thomas Hammond (merchant) =

English-Norwegian merchant and landowner (1630–1681)

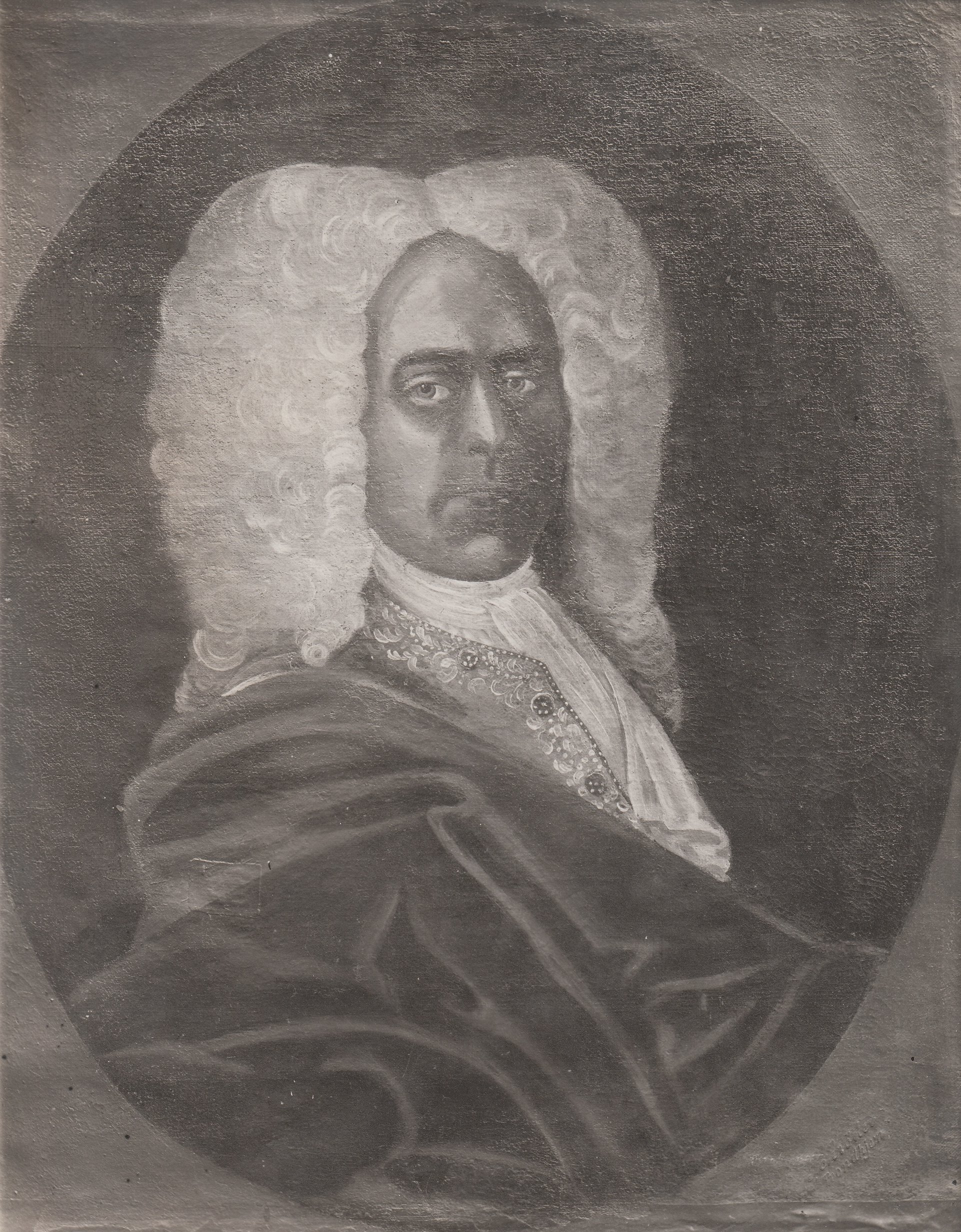
- Thomas Hammond (1630–1681)
- Born: 1630; Suffolk, England
- Died: 1681 (aged 50–51); Trondheim, Norway
- Occupation(s): Merchant and landowner
- Spouse: Elisabeth Henriksdatter Sommerschild (m. 1659)
- Children: 7, including Sara Hammond

Thomas Hammond (1630 – April 1681) was an English-born Norwegian merchant and landowner who specialised in the timber trade. He was one of the most prominent businessmen in Trondheim during the 17th century.

== Life ==
Hammond was born in 1630 in Suffolk, England to landowner Edward Hammond (c. 1595 – c. 1660). Hammond settled in Trondheim, following a growing timber trade between Norway and England. Hammond worked with his brother John, a merchant in London, in the timber trade. He eventually acquired land properties and forests, and was among the powerful merchants in Trondheim in the 17th century. He ran a lumber trading business and held agriculture and forests in central and northern Norway. He also ran a sawmill with wood from its own forests.

In 1659, he married Elisabeth Henriksdatter Sommerschild (1635–1682), who was the daughter of another English immigrant, Henrik Sommerschild (1584–1664). They had seven children including Sara Hammond who married Albert Angell, who were the parents of Thomas Angell.

== Death and legacy ==
Thomas Hammond died during the 1681 Trondheim fire (18–19 April 1681). After his death, Hammond was granted a certificate from a magistrate stating that he was an honest trader. At the time of his death, Hammond was owed money by various debtors, but the fire had destroyed most of the debtor's papers. Disputes between the heirs and the estate's debtors would persist for several years after Hammond's demise.

A year after his death, his wife Elisabeth died. It was speculated that she had deliberately thrown herself into a river. She was buried in Trondheim cathedral.
