= List of Norwegian estates =

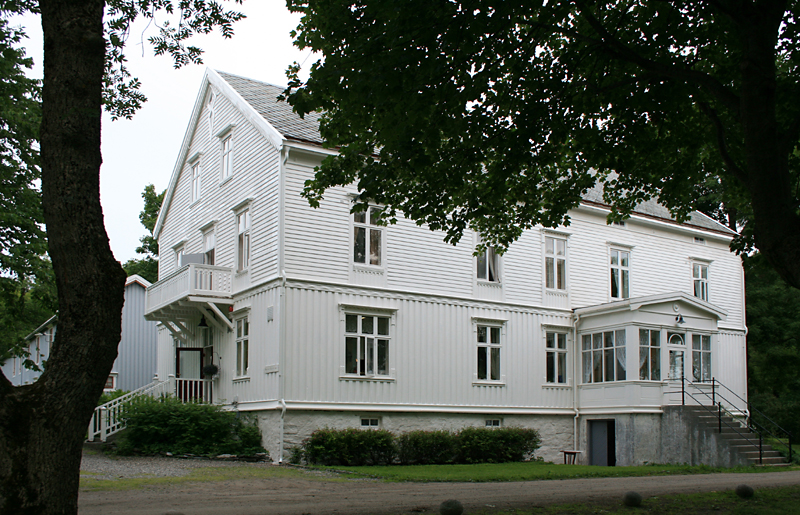
Tjøtta Farm, seat of the former Tjøtta Estate. Photograph: Commons user Mahlum

List of Norwegian estates contains former and present bigger gatherings of land in Norway of the Crown, of the Church, of the noble estate, and of commoners. See also the list of Norway's biggest landowners.

== Northern Norway ==
Northern Norway. Illustration: Commons user Marmelad

Central Norway. Illustration: Commons user Marmelad

Western Norway. Illustration: Commons user Marmelad

Southern Norway. Illustration: Commons user Marmelad

Eastern Norway. Illustration: Commons user Marmelad

Counties: Finnmark, Nordland, Troms.

Estate	Estate seat	County	Secondary names	Transferred or divided into estate(s)	Reference
Benkestok Estate	Meløya Farm	Nordland		No longer in existence.	
Bentsjord Estate	Bentsjord Farm	Troms	Moursundian Estate	Dissolved.	
Dønnes Estate	Dønnes Farm	Nordland		Dissolved in 1912.	
Helgeland Estate		Nordland			
Husby Estate	Husby Farm	Nordland		Still in existence.	
Inndyr Estate		Nordland		Crown Estate	
Inndyr Estate II		Nordland			
Irgens Estate		Nordland; Troms		Helgeland Estate; Inndyr Estate II; Tromsø Estate etc.	
Karnes Estate	Karnes Farm	Troms			
Rana and Vefsn Estate		Nordland			
Skjervøy Estate	Hamnnes Farm			Still in existence.	
Terråk Estate	Terråk Farm	Nordland		Still in existence.	
Tjøtta Estate	Tjøtta Farm	Nordland	Brodtkorbian Estate	Dissolved in 1929.	
Tromsø Estate	Karnes Farm	Troms		Bentsjord Estate; Karnes Estate; Skjervøy Estate	

== Central Norway ==
Counties: Nord-Trøndelag, Sør-Trøndelag.

Estate	Estate seat	County	Secondary names	Transferred or divided into estate(s)	Reference
Austrått Estate		Sør-Trøndelag			
Fosen Estate		Sør-Trøndelag			
Holla Estate		Sør-Trøndelag			
Reinskloster Estate		Sør-Trøndelag			
Verdal Estate		Nord-Trøndelag		Still in existence.	

== Western Norway ==
Counties: Hordaland, Møre og Romsdal, Rogaland, Sogn og Fjordane.

Estate	Estate seat	County	Secondary names	Transferred or divided into estate(s)	References
Giske Estate					
Kaupanger Estate	Kaupanger Farm	Sogn og Fjordane		Still in existence.	
Rosendal Estate		Hordaland			

== Southern Norway ==
Counties: Aust-Agder, Vest-Agder.

== Eastern Norway ==
Counties: Akershus, Buskerud, Hedmark, Oppland, Oslo, Telemark, Vestfold, Østfold.

Estate	Estate seat	County	Secondary names	Transferred or divided into estate(s)	References
Jarlsberg Estate	Jarlsberg Farm				
Refsnes Estate	Refsnes Farm				
Sudreim Estate	Sørum Farm	Akershus		No longer in existence.	

== Crown Estate ==
- Norwegian crown estate
- Finnmark Estate

== Church Estate ==
- Norwegian church estate

== See also ==
List of the largest landowners of Norway
