= Bentsjord Estate =

Estate in Troms, Norway

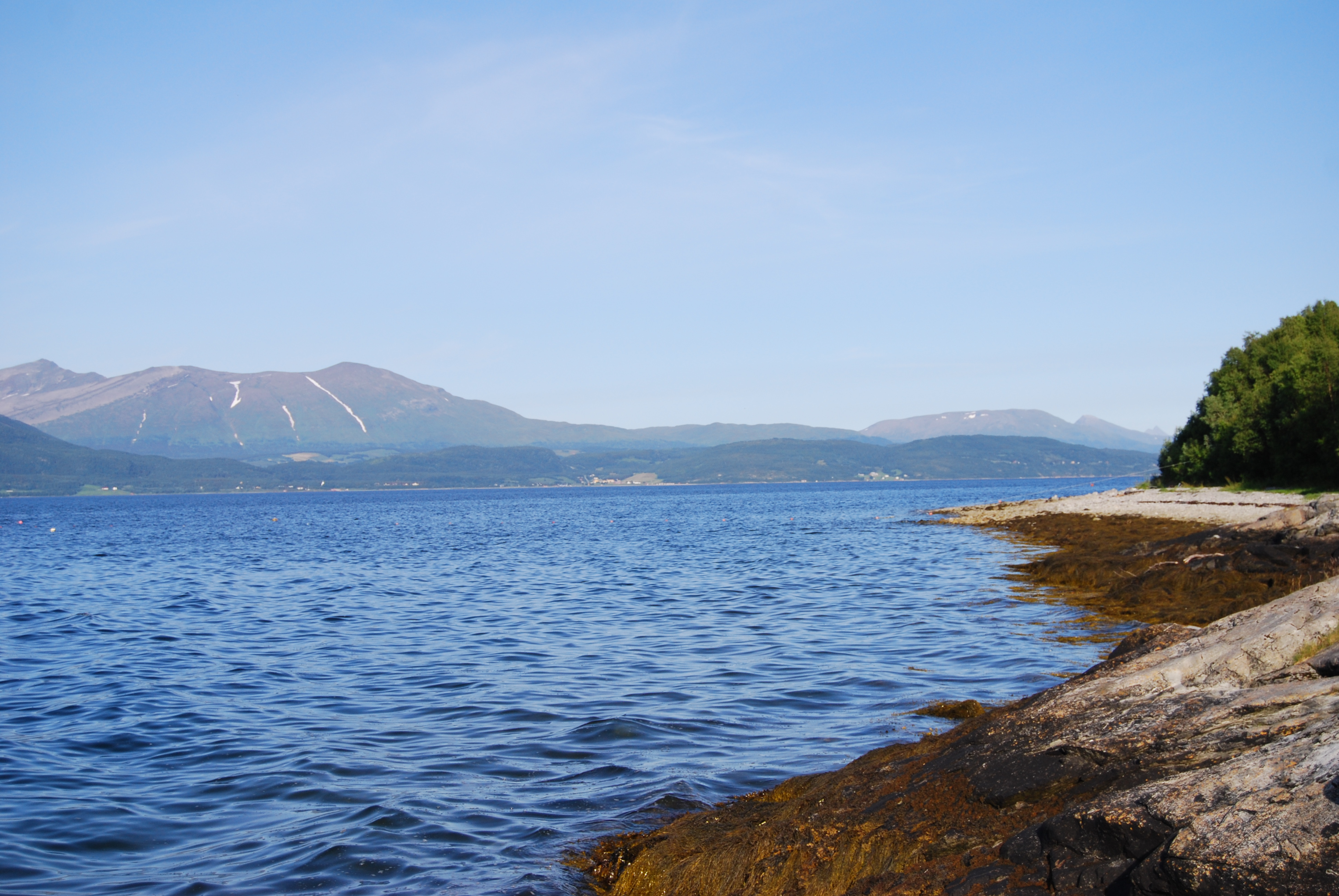
Malangen

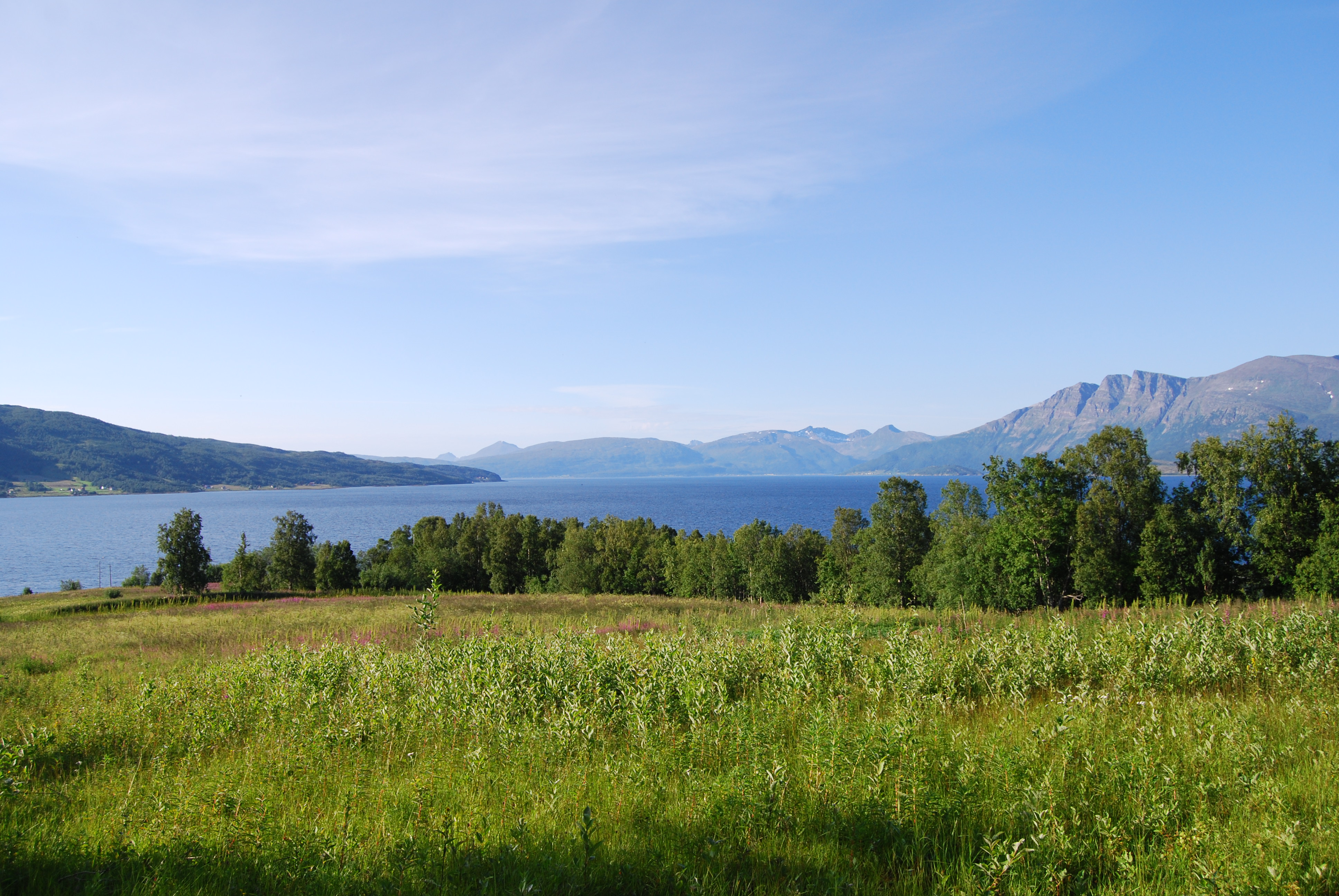
Malangen

The Bentsjord Estate (Norwegian: Bentsjordgodset), also known as the Moursund Estate (Norwegian: Det moursundske gods), was an estate in Troms, Norway.

== History ==
=== Owners ===
From 1783, the southern part of the Tromsø Estate belonged to the Moursund family, whose seat was the Bentsjord Farm. Through his marriage to Elisabeth Wasmuth, who was the heiress to part of the Tromsø Estate, Hans Andreas Moursund (died 1802) became the owner of this land. His son was Andreas Røst Moursund (died 1850), whose only son was Hans Andreas Moursund (1818–1880). Hans Andreas Moursund Jr. started selling off the estate.

=== Sale of farms and forest ===
In 1860, the estate consisted of approximately 300 farm parcels in Tromsøysund, Balsfjord, Malangen, and Hillesøy, and approximately 5,000 hectares (12,000 acres) of forest. Many farm parcels were sold to their respective tenant farmers in and after 1862. In 1892, the state bought the forest, which was subsequently sold to the tenant farmers. The Bentsjord Farm was sold at auction in 1890. By 1900, the Bentsjord Estate had been effectively dissolved.

== Notable people ==
Notable people born at the Bentsjord Estate include:

- Kristian Moursund (1853–1892), lawyer and Storting representative

== See also ==
- List of Norwegian estates

== Literature and sources ==
- Store norske leksikon: Moursund
- Store norske leksikon: Moursundske gods
