= Kristian Moursund =

Norwegian politician

Kristian Peder Moursund
- Born: July 20, 1853; Bentsjord Estate, Norway
- Died: April 16, 1892 (aged 38); Kristiania (Oslo), Norway
- Occupations: Politician, Liberal Party

Kristian Peder Moursund (July 20, 1853 – April 16, 1892) was a Norwegian lawyer and Storting representative. He was a member of the Liberal Party.

Moursund was the son of Hans Andreas Moursund (1818–1880), the owner of the Bentsjord Estate, where he was born. He began studying law in Tromsø in 1870 and received his Candidate of Law degree three years later. From 1876 to 1877 he was a district stipendiary magistrate (sorenskriver) in Hardanger, and he started working as a lawyer in Tromsø in 1878. Moursund was a member of the Tromsø town council from 1882 until he moved away in 1885. In 1886 he became the treasurer at the Hypotekbanken loan office in Tromsø. He became the chairman of the pastor's salary committee in 1891. In 1891 he also became a district stipendiary magistrate in Lofoten.

Moursund represented Troms county in the Storting from 1886 to 1892. He was a member of its second justice committee from 1886 to 1888, first nutrition committee in 1888, constitutional committee from 1889 to 1891, and electoral committee in 1892. From 1889 to 1892 he was also a member of the Lagting (upper house of the parliament), and in 1892 chairman of the constitution committee and secretary of the power of attorney committee. The Moursund Order of the Day (Moursundske dagsorden), an 1892 resolution that the Norwegian authorities alone should handle the establishment of Norwegian consular services, is named after him.

Moursund died in Kristiania in 1892.
