= Hans Michelsen =

Norwegian sculptor

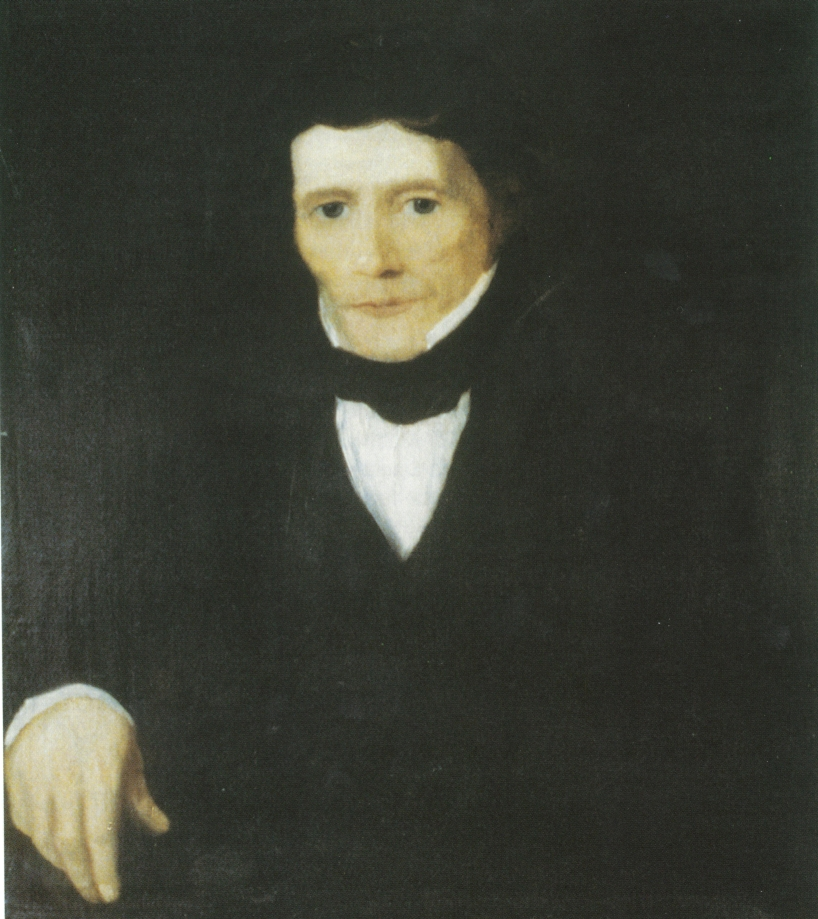
Hans Michelsen portrayed by Mathias Stoltenberg.

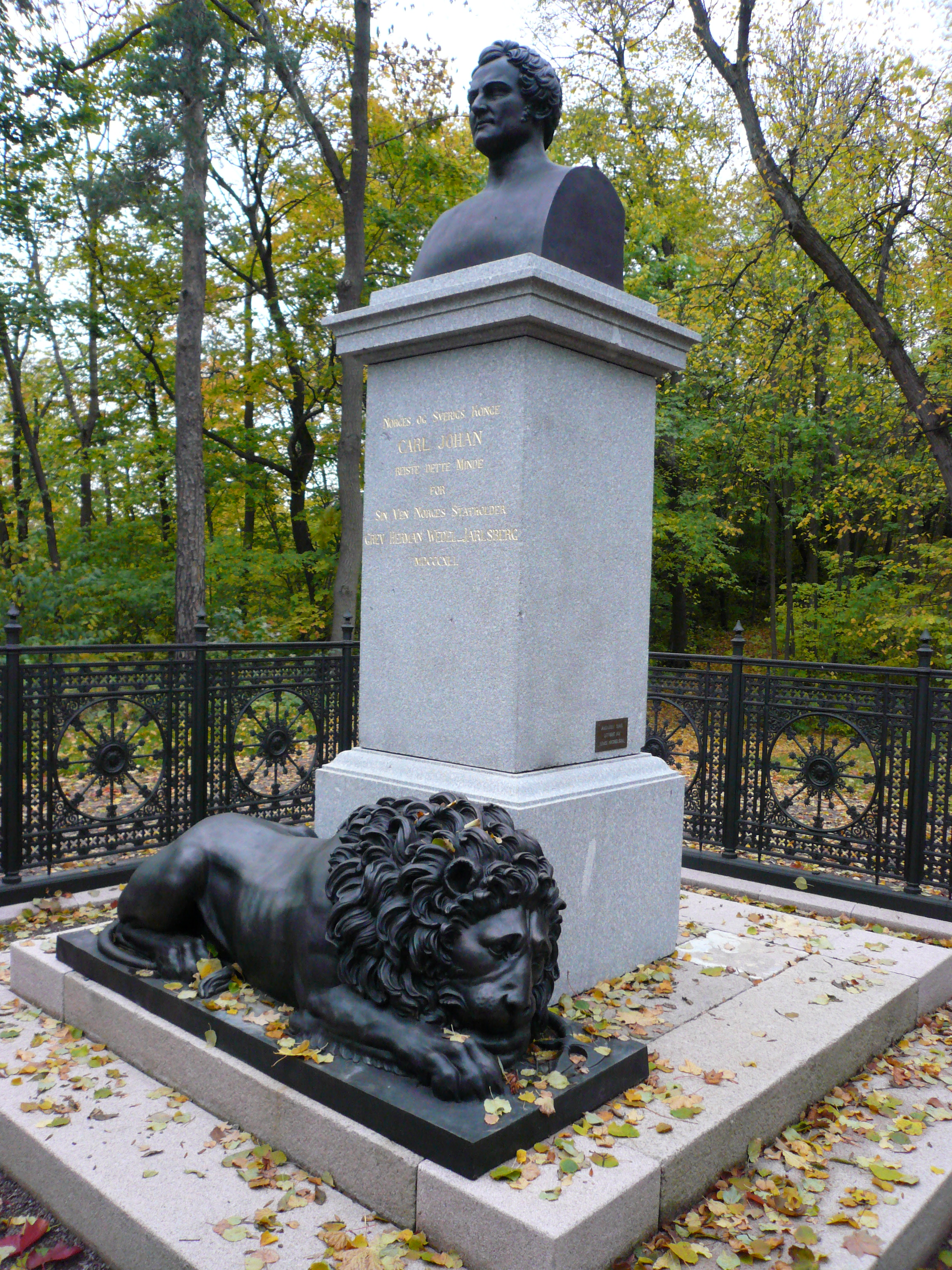
Michelsen's Wedel-Jarlsberg memorial.

Hans Michelsen (1789 – 20 June 1859) was a Norwegian sculptor.

He was born in Melhus; the son of farmer Michel Sørensen Hægstad and Abel Jonsdatter. He studied sculpture with Erik Gustaf Göthe in Stockholm from 1815, and from 1820 to 1826 with Bertel Thorvaldsen in Rome. Among his works are busts of Prime Minister Peder Anker, Charles XIII of Sweden, Charles XIV John of Sweden, Crown Prince Oscar and Thomas Angell.
