= Tromsø Estate =

Estate in Troms, Norway

Coordinates: 70°07′57″N 19°28′13″E

Tromsø Estate (Tromsøgodset) was an estate located in Troms, Norway. It was once part of the more sizable Irgens Estate.

== History ==
The estate had its origin in a crown property which in 1666 was transferred to Joachim Irgens von Westervick as part of his acquisition of all the crown estates located in Helgeland, Salten, Lofoten, Vesterålen, Andenes, Senja, and Troms. When Joachim Irgens von Westervick died in 1675, the Irgens Estate was divided to satisfy creditors. In 1677, the Tromsø properties were taken over by Chancellor Gjert Lange (1649–1732), co-owner of Røros Copper Works. The newly created estate consisted of approximately 120 farms and 90 Sami clearings (Norwegian: finnerydning).

In 1705, Baroness Cornelia de Bickers von Westervick (1629–1708), the widow of Baron Joachim Irgens von Westervick, bought the Tromsø estate. She sat as a proprietarian until her death in 1708. In 1713, her relative, Baron Ernst Jacob de Petersen, took over the estate. His sons sold it in 1751 to the estate to merchant Johan Christian Hvid (1714–1765) from Trondheim. His father, Michael Hvid (1680–1757), had been the estate manager since 1716 and remained so until his death in 1765. In 1764, Johan Hysing bought the estate, and he was in 1771 followed by his son, Ahlert Hysing. His brother-in-law, Andreas Røst, bought the estate in 1772, and in 1777 and 1781, it was sold to Georg Wasmuth (1724–1800).

On 10 June 1783, the Tromsø Estate was divided into three separate estates:

- Skjervøy Estate (Skjervøygodset) : The northern part, including Skjervøy and Kåfjord up to the border of Finnmark, was taken over by Ahlert Hysing.
- Karnes Estate (Karnesgodset): The middle part, including Helgøy, Karlsøy, Ullsfjord and Lyngen, was taken over by Georg Wasmuth and later his son Ulrik Wasmuth (ca. 1765 1801).
- Bentsjord Estate (Bentsjordgodset): The southern part, including Hillesø and Troms, was taken over by Hans Andreas Moursund (1738–1802), who was married to Georg Wasmuth's daughter Elisabeth Margrete Wasmuth (1749–1786).

== See also ==
- List of Norwegian estates
