= Lorentz Lossius =

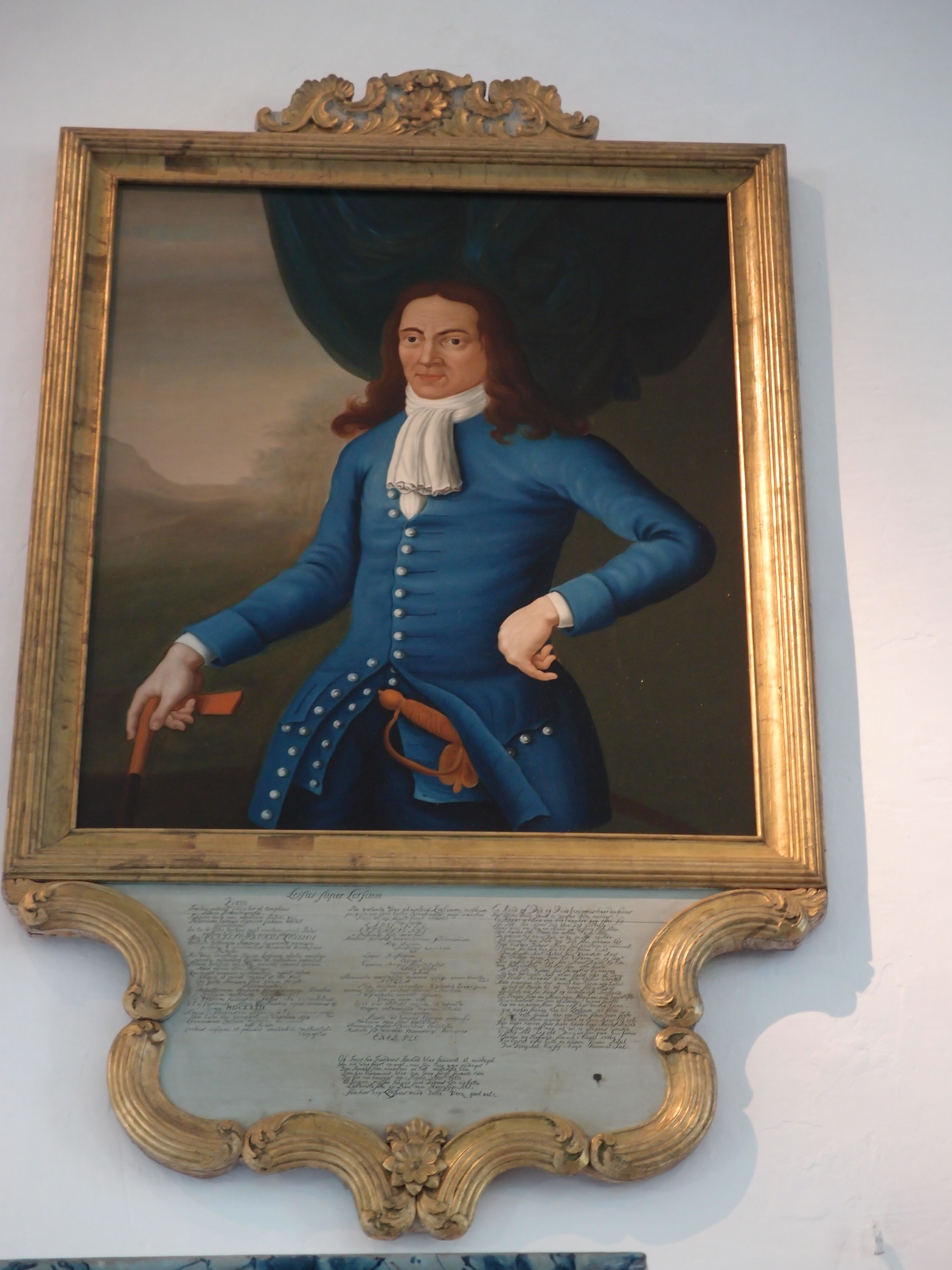
Lorentz Lossius, painted by Peder Andersen Lilje c. 1670

Lorentz Lossius (26 June 1589 – 1654) was a German-born Norwegian mining engineer. He was the founder and first director of the Røros Copper Works (Røros Kobberverk).

Lorentz Andreas Christophersen Lossius was born in the village of Lommatzsch in Saxony. He was a son of Lutheran priest Christopher Lossius (1560–1626). He studied character art and mathematics at the University of Leipzig. Lossius first worked for the Kongsberg Silver Mines where he started as an accountant (schichtmester) at the silver mine in 1631. In 1635, he relocated to the Kvikne Copper Works.

In 1644, he started test production at Rauhammaren in the Røros district, but initially the ore was poor. This led to the later discovery of the large deposit of copper ore at what became the Storwartz mines in the Røros Copper Works. Rights were issued in 1645 with Lossius as part-owner of the new company. Smelting was built, and promising test operations got underway in 1646. This is regarded as the establishment of the Røros Copper Works. Lossius remained as director of the Røros Copper Works (1646–1651), at which time he was replaced by Joachim Irgens von Westervick.
