= Irgens Estate =

Private estate in Norway

Northern Norway. Illustration: Commons user Marmelad

The Irgens Estate (Norwegian: Irgensgodset), which existed from 1666 and to c. 1675, was a private estate in Norway.

== History ==
=== Establishment ===
During King Frederick III of Denmark and Norway's wars in the 1650s Joachim Irgens, later ennobled as von Westervick, had provided the army with considerable amounts of deliveries. On 12 January 1666, as payment for this, the King gave Irgens all crown estate in Helgeland, Salten, Lofoten, Vesterålen, Andenes, Senja, and Troms. Thereby Irgens became the owner of big parts of Northern Norway minus Finnmark. It was and is the biggest single sale of land ever to happen in the Nordic countries.

In addition to the estate in Norway, Irgens owned land in Denmark, the Netherlands, and the Eastern Indies.

=== Bankruptcy and dissolution ===
When Joachim Irgens von Westervick died in 1675, it was stated that he was bankrupt due to debt to private creditors. The Irgens Estate was subsequently divided between the creditors, creating among others the following estates:

- Helgeland Estate
- Inndyr Estate
- Tromsø Estate

Later his widow, Cornelia Irgens von Westervick, managed to buy back some parts of the estate, among other the Tromsø Estate. After her death in 1708 her relative Baron Jacob de Petersen inherited some of this land.

== See also ==
- List of Norwegian estates
