= Tom Hammond (footballer) =

Australian rules footballer (1896–1966)

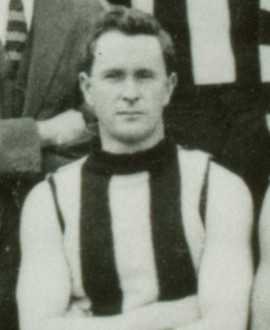
- Hammond in 1922

Personal information
- Full name: Tom Hammond
- Born: 22 November 1896
- Died: 16 July 1966 (aged 69)
- Original team: Public Service
- Height: 175 cm (5 ft 9 in)
- Weight: 80 kg (176 lb)

Playing career^{1}
| Years | Club | Games (Goals) |
| 1921–23 | Collingwood | 18 (4) |
- ^{1} Playing statistics correct to the end of 1923.

Tom Hammond (22 November 1896 – 16 July 1966) was a former Australian rules footballer who played with Collingwood in the Victorian Football League (VFL).
