= Thomas Angell (born 1692) =

Norwegian merchant

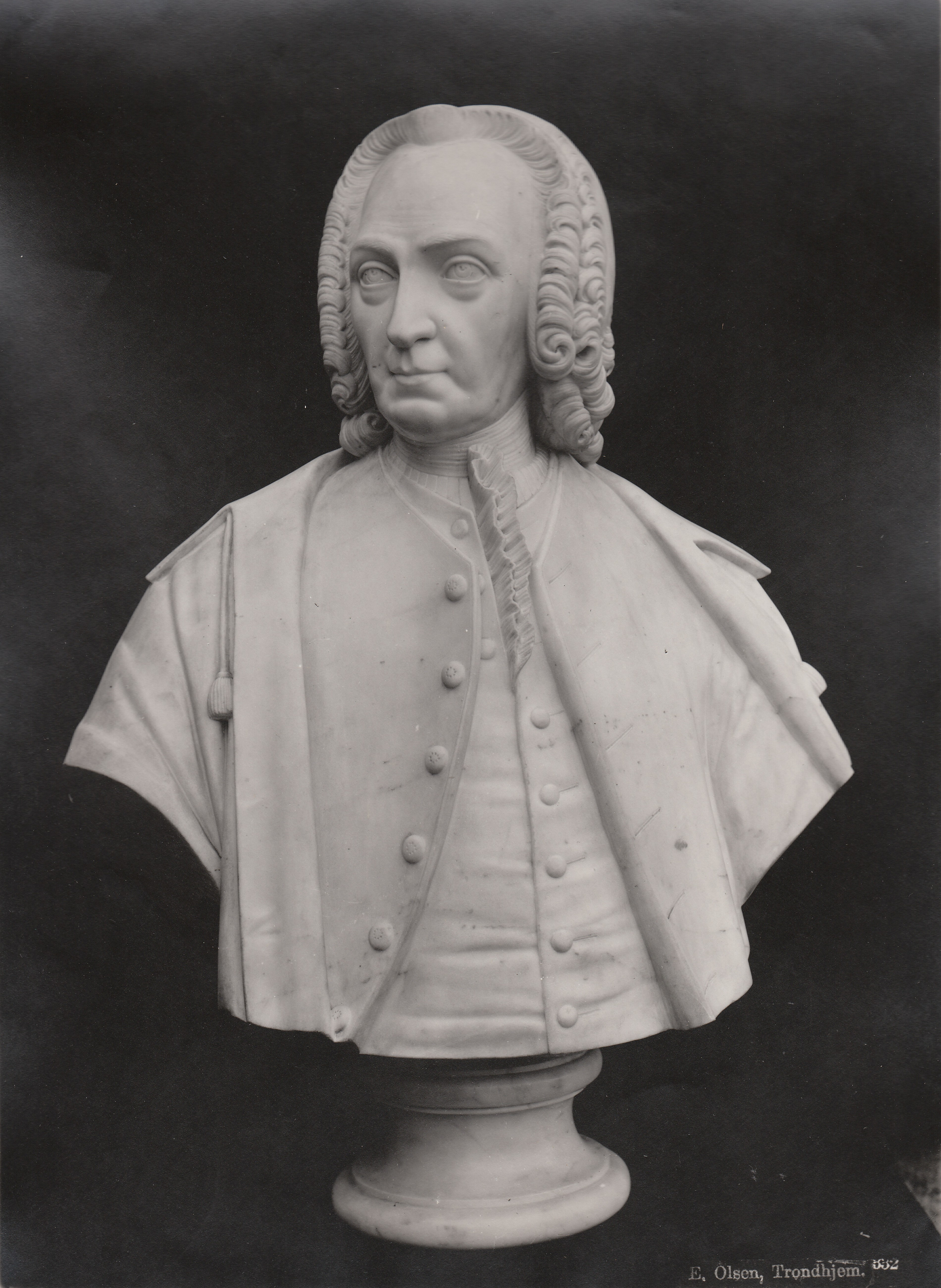
Marble bust of Angell from 1845 by Hans Michelsen.

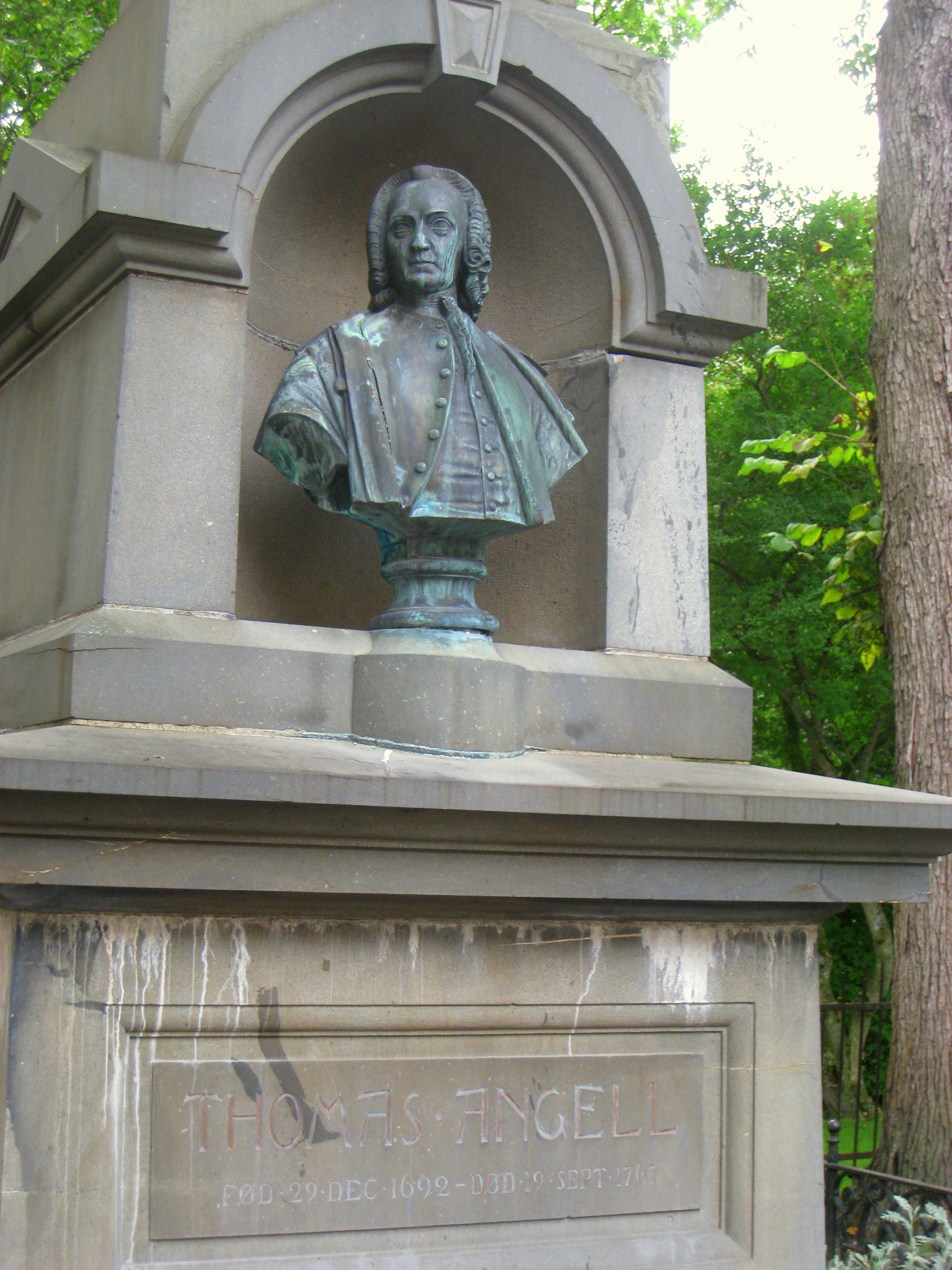
Bust of Thomas Angell.

Thomas Angell (29 December 1692 – 19 September 1767) was a Norwegian merchant, estate owner, mine owner and philanthropist.

== Biography ==
Thomas Angell was born in Trondheim, the son of merchant Albert Lorenzen Angell. He was educated in theology in Copenhagen. Angell inherited a large fortune from his parents, who belonged to a wealthy trading family with roots in Southern Schleswig. Together with his brother Lorentz Angell (1690–1751), Thomas Angell managed the estate of the Angell family. The business activities eventually included saw mills, shipping companies and the export of various commodities. In addition the Angell brothers owned and managed their interests in the Røros Copper Works.

Thomas Angell donated his fortune to a charity trust fund through his will. The trust fund is administered by the Thomas Angell Foundations (Thomas Angells Stiftelser). Thomas Angell House, a large building complex in Trondheim with apartments for the elderly, was built by the Thomas Angell Foundation between the years 1770 and 1772. The building also provides offices for administration of the Thomas Angell Foundation.

== Other sources ==
- Bull, Ida (1992) Thomas Angell – kapitalisten som ble hjembyens velgjører (Trondheim: Thomas Angells stiftelser) ISBN 8271640283

== Related Reading ==
- Thomas Angell by Olaf Kringhaug
- Ida Bull (2006) Immigrating Merchants to Trondheim in the 18th Century
