= Asschat =

- Hamlet
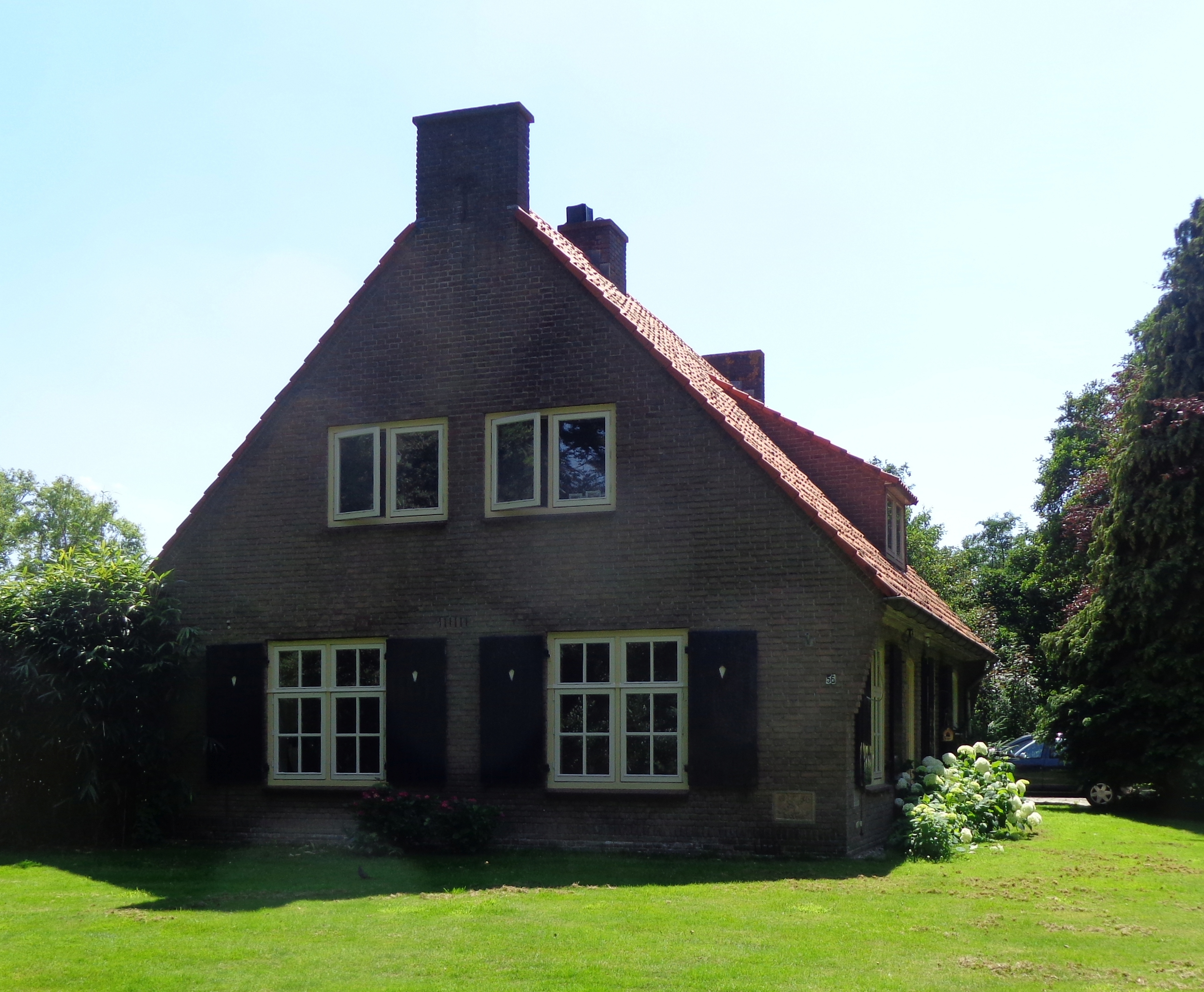
- Farm in Asschat

- Location in the Netherlands Asschat (Netherlands)
- Coordinates: 52°7′54″N 5°27′1″E
- Country: Netherlands
- Province: Utrecht
- Municipality: Leusden
- Time zone: UTC+1 (CET)
  - Summer (DST): UTC+2 (CEST)
- Postal code: 3431
- Dialing code: 033

Asschat is a hamlet in the municipality Leusden, in the Dutch province of Utrecht.

The hamlet is separated from the village of Leusden in the west by the Valleikanaal canal, and it borders the hamlet Snorrenhoef in the east. The name Asschat (1696) derives from af-schede, afscheiding: partition, indicating an old border.

Asschat is not a statistical entity, and the postal authorities have placed it under Leusden. It used to have place name signs, however they have been removed. In 1840, Asschat was home to 172 people. At the outbreak of World War II, it was the scene of heavy fighting. All the farms were set on fire to slow the German advance. The animals were set free, but some returned to their farm. Nowadays, it consists of about 20 houses.

The family Scholten van Aschat is named after the hamlet.

== Gallery ==
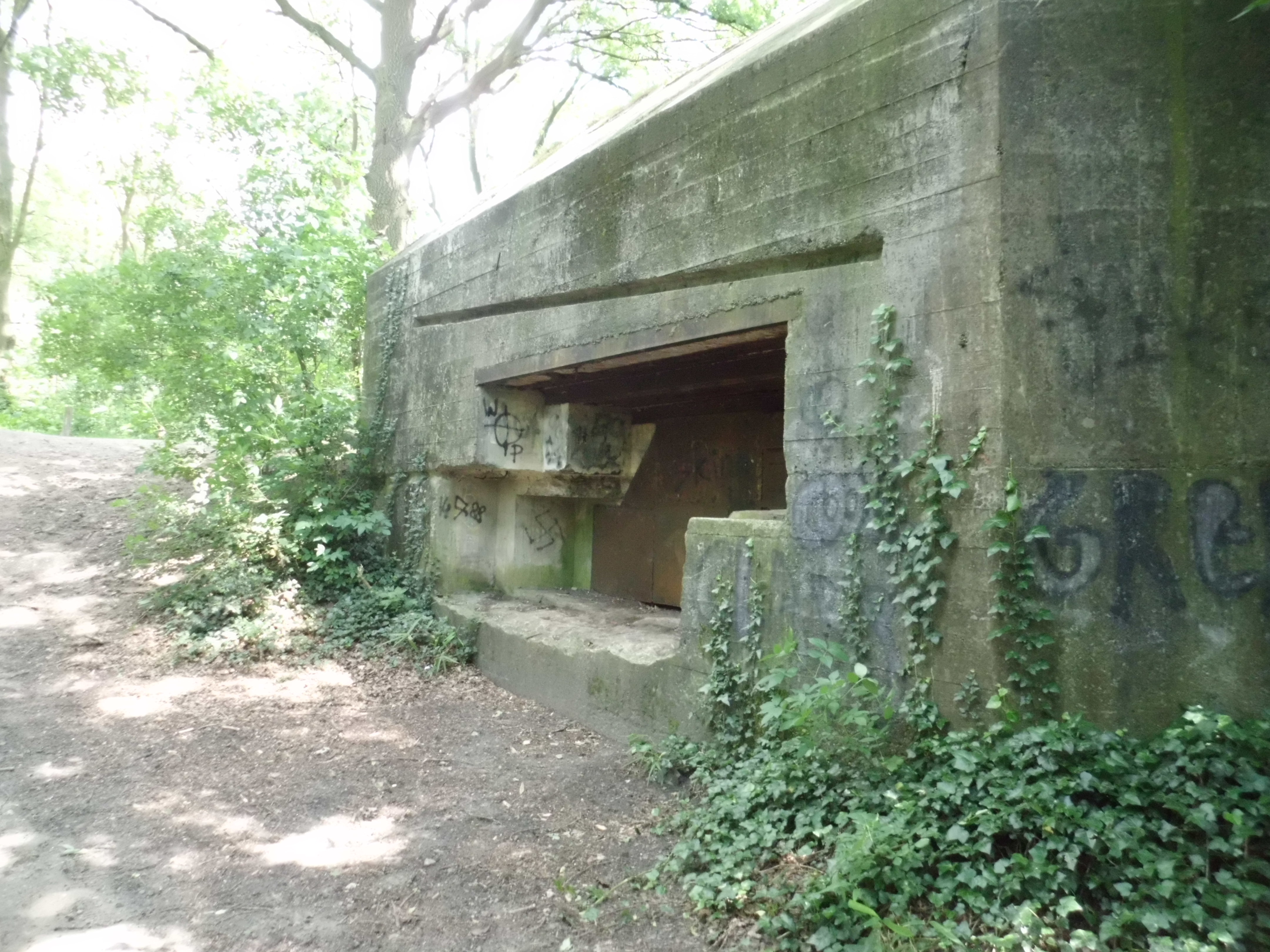
World War II bunker in Asschat

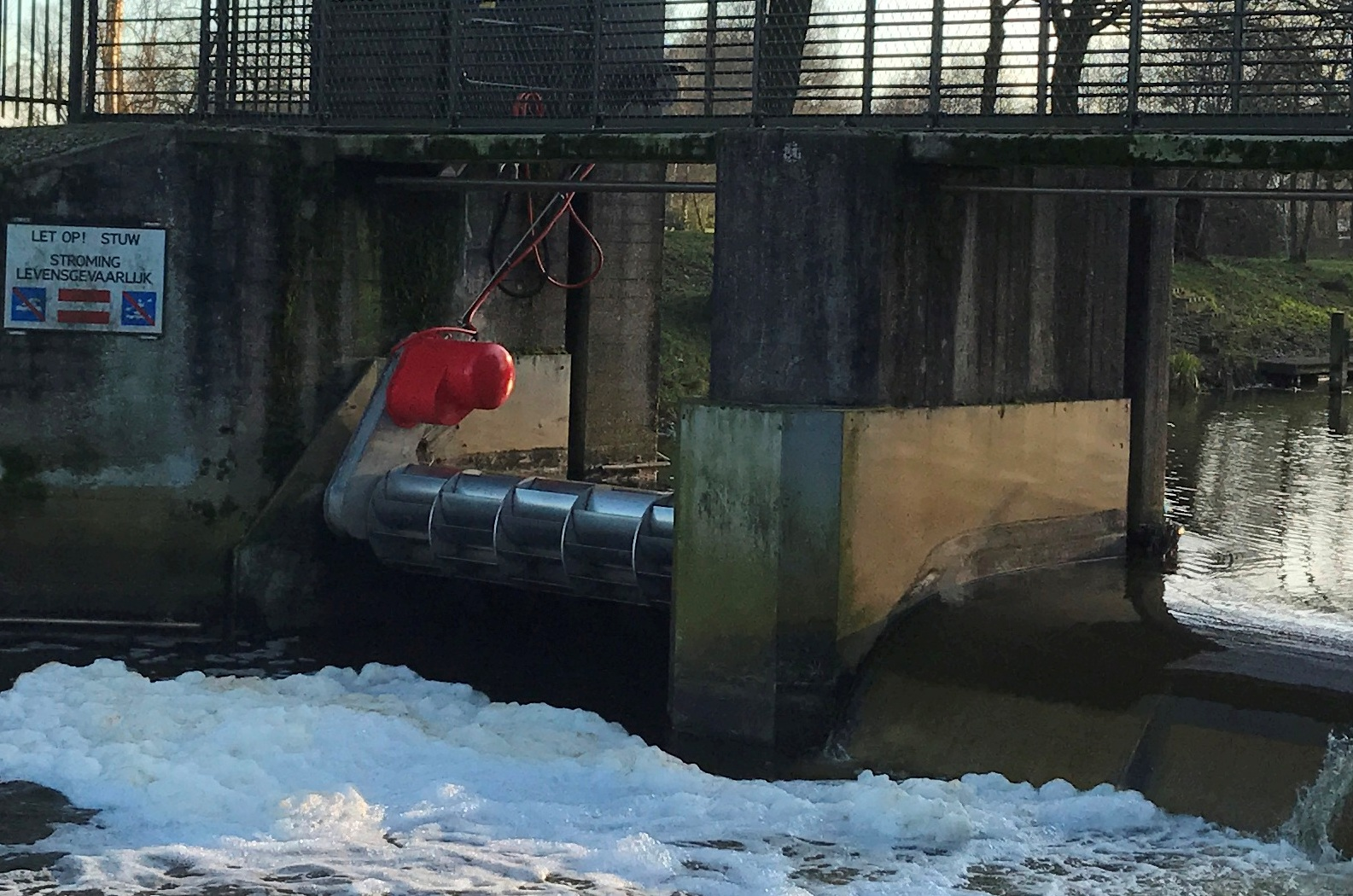
Weir and mini hydroelectric plant in Asschat
