= Værdalsbruket =

Estate in Norway

AS Værdalsbruket is a company and estate covering 900 square kilometers (350 sq mi) of Verdal Municipality, Norway. The estate covers 60% of Verdal Municipality, of which 170 square kilometers (66 sq mi) is productive forest. The estate now known as Værdalsbruket was first established in 1807. It is owned by Storebrand, an insurance company.

== History ==
Development of the estates started in the 17th century, when sawmills were established in the valley, and the first concept of private ownership of forests was established. The first sawmill was Grunnfoss Sag, established by Peder Juel in 1655, and included the rights from Ulvilla to Skjækerfossen. Peter Dreier received permission for the estates of Suul and Nybygget in 1683. Grunnfoss Sag was bought by Rasmus Ågeson Hagen in 1686, as he started acquiring farms in the area. The name Værdalsgodset was taken into use for parts of the area in 1736. During the 1780s and 1790s, Johan Wideroe Tonning bought the farms Suul, Nybygget, Malså, Juldal, and Væren estates. In 1807, Christen J. Müller, the owner of Vinje Gods in Mosvik, bought Tonning's estates and the Hagen family's estates (known as Vukugodset). After the estate filed for bankruptcy in 1819 during bad market conditions for the lumber industry, it was sold to Hilmar Meincke, who started using Holmen as the head office. The estate was again to do Nicolai Jenssen in 1832, who in 1845 rebuilt Holmen. He also built the first steam saw in Ørmelen in 1872.The Verdal Landslide on 19 May 1893 made shipping from Verdal impossible, resulting in a new sawmill being built in Levanger, which opened in 1902.

Verdal Municipality bought the estate in 1908, but after much local debate sold it again in 1912 to Hjalmar Wessel. A year later, Trones Bruk, a sawmill in Verdalsøra, was built. He also sold 75 workers' homes and 61 crofts, along with 16 square kilometers (6.2 sq mi) of forest. During the late 1920s, the company had economic problems, and by 1930 the company had used up its share capital. The insurance company and main creditor, Idun, took over the administration of the company, and the ownership from 1932. In 1999, Trones Bruk was merged with Kirkesvaag Sagbruk & Høvleri and Innbryn Sagbruk og Høvleri to create InnTre.
