= Joachim Irgens von Westervick =

Dano-Norwegian nobleman, Danish official and estate owner

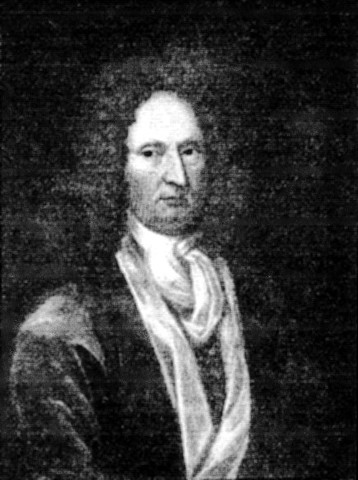
Portrait of his nephew, Joachim Irgens (1644–1725)

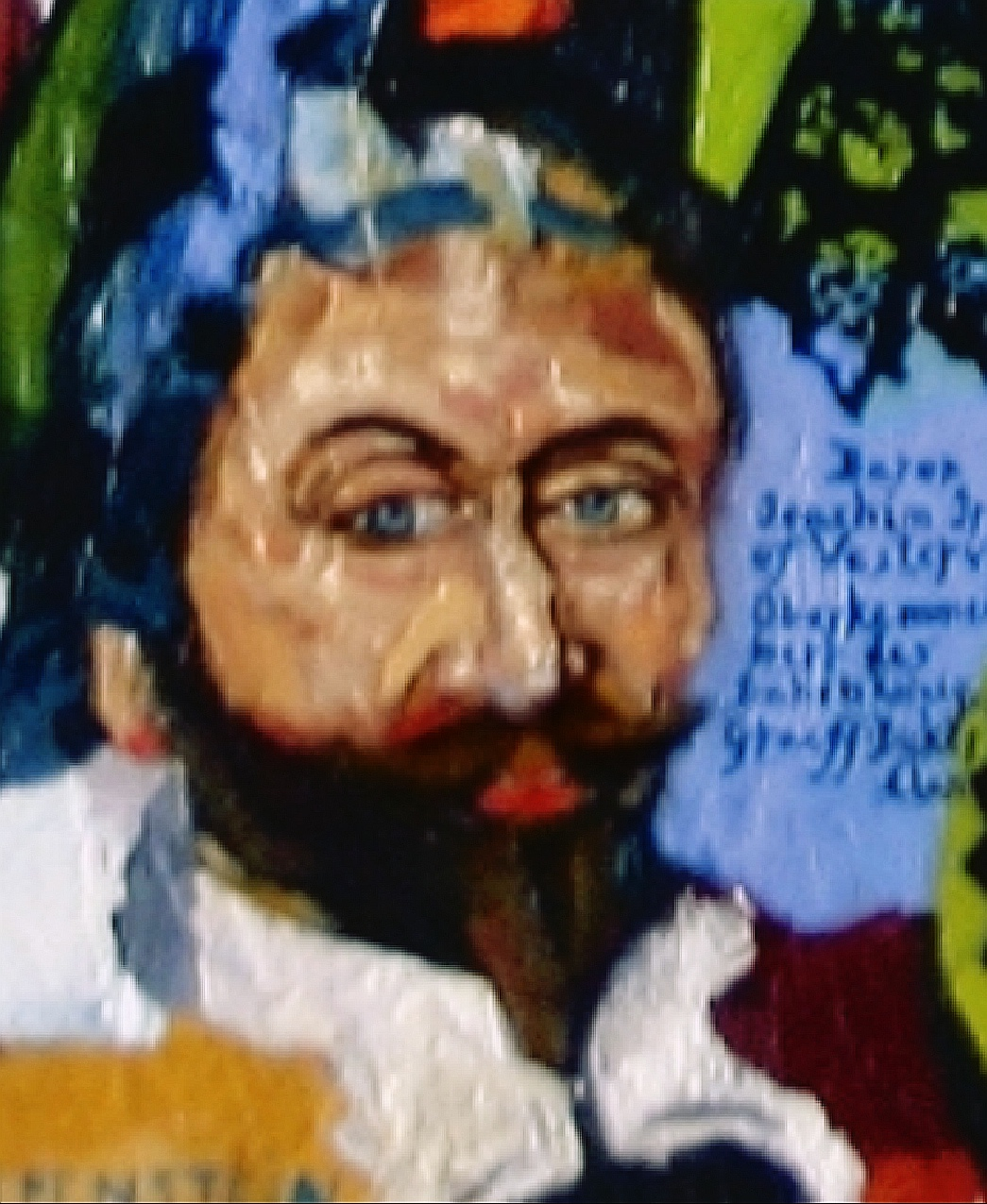
In 2007, Austrian artist Matthias Laurenz Gräff, a distant descendant of Irgens, used him in his painting "Durch die Zeiten" (Through the times) as part of his diploma series.

Joachim Irgens von Westervick (Danish: Joachim Irgens von Westervick; spelled also af Westervig and af Vestervig) (19 May 1611 - 29 August 1675), born as Jochum Jürgens, was a Dano-Norwegian nobleman, a Danish official and an estate owner. He was one of the most important financial magnates and entrepreneurs in Denmark–Norway and also hold land in the Netherlands. Between 1666 and 1675 he owned the Norwegian Irgens Estate, which was huge part of Northern Norway, as a private estate. He held the titles of Lord (later Baron) of Vestervig, Lord of Horsleben and Noordlanden. The Danish variant of his name by birth was Joachim Irgens.

== Early life and family ==
Joachim Jürgens was the son of merchant Heinrich Jürgens (* 1580) and Catharina Fruchtnichts (* 1584) in Itzehoe in Holstein. He married in 1656 Cornelia Bicker (1629–1708), the daughter of Andries Bicker, former mayor of Amsterdam. Through his marriage he became a cousin-in-law of the Dutch politician elite like Johan de Witt and Andries de Graeff, and also of Jacob de Petersen, another nordic politician who come to the Dutch Republic and associated with the Amsterdam oligarchy by marriage. De Petersen married Catharina Bicker (1642–1678), granddaughter of Andries Bicker.

Like his brother Johannes Jürgens (1613–1669) later named Irgens as well, he studied medicine. However, after having travelled around the world, Irgens became in 1634 the Lord Chamberlain of King Christian IV of Denmark and Norway and later Frederick III of Denmark and Norway. He became Christian's banker and his privy councillor (Geheimrat). Jürgens was also occasionally given diplomatic assignments by the Danish government. Around 1640 the king changed his name from Jürgens to Irgens. After his marriage in 1656, the couple settled in Copenhagen.

== Business and holdings ==
Joachim Irgens was early involved as an owner of various mines, among others Røros Copper Works. Due to in the 1650s having provided Frederik III wars with considerable amounts of deliveries, Joachim Irgens received as payment, on 12 January 1666, all the crown estate in Helgeland, Salten, Lofoten, Vesterålen, Andenes, Senja, and Troms in Norway. The so called Irgens Estate was a huge part of Northern Norway minus Finnmark. It was and is the biggest single sale of land ever to happen in the Nordic countries. This sale represented 50 percent of all property in Northern Norway, and the value was calculated to 100,000 riksdaler, equivalent to 2,700 kilogrammes of gold. Together with the properties, Irgens got the right to all annual rent fees as well as e.g. tithe, the Lap tax and leidang. Irgens had estates also in Denmark (among others his seat Vestervig) and the Eastern Indies. In Holland, his wife's homeland, he owned the Irgensthal estate in 's-Graveland. Between 1662 and 1675 he was Hoofdingeland of 's-Graveland. Irgens also owned Gjorslev between 1664 and 1675.

== Ennoblement ==
Coat of arms of Joachim Irgens von Westervick in a modern drawing.

On 4 October 1674, Joachim Irgens was ennobled as Baron under the name von Westervick, thus becoming a member of the Danish and the Norwegian nobility. His noble coat of arms consisted of a four-part shield, the first and fourth field of which shows a golden fish between two gold crowns on a red background. The second field has a red bar on a golden background. The third field is divided, three white sea flowers grow up into the blue sky from a pool of water.

== Loss of land estates ==
Joachim von Westervick died in Copenhagen August 29, 1675. He was then bankrupt, wherefore the estates were dissolved. The Irgens Estate was subsequently divided between the creditors, creating among others the following estates: Helgeland Estate, Inndyr Estate and Tromsø Estate. For example, his properties in Helgeland were sold to Lorentz Mortensen Angell in Trondheim. His widow managed to buy back some of the land, among other the Tromsø Estate, and remained standing as a proprietarian until her death in 1708. Some properties were then inherited by Baron Ernst Jacob de Petersen, son of Jacob de Petersen, from Amsterdam.

== See also ==
- Danish nobility
- Norwegian nobility
- Irgens Estate

== Literature and sources ==
- Joachim Irgens von Westerwick. Leben im 17. Jahrhundert im Spannungsfeld zwischen Fürstendienst und internationalen Handelsunternehmungen (Joachim Irgens von Westerwick: Life in the 17th century caught between service to princes and international trading ventures), by Matthias Laurenz Gräff (2026)
- Store norske leksikon: Joachim Irgens, Joachim Irgens – utdypning
- P. L. Hald: Joachim Irgens til Vestervig (PDF; 123 kB) or: http://www.amsterdam.no/norske_spor/irgens/irgens-bicker/Hald,%20%20P_%20L_%20%20Joachim%20Irgens%20til%20Vestervig.pdf
- Joachim Irgens and Cornelia Bickers
- Das Geschlecht der Irgens. By Einar Irgens Loe (RTF; 11 kB)
