= Røros Copper Works =

Coordinates: 62°34′37″N 11°23′28″E

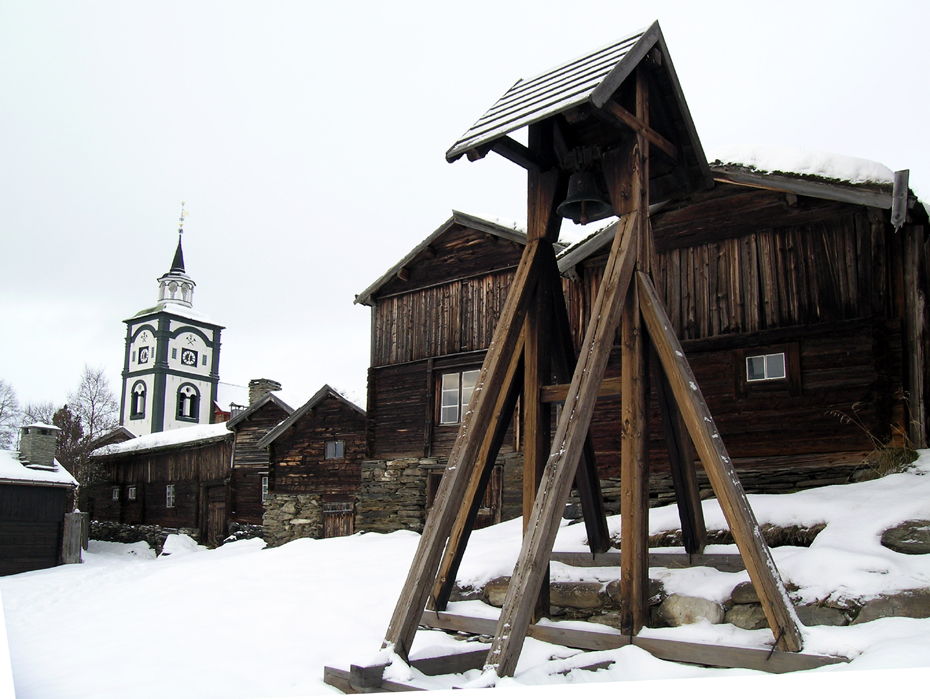
Bell from Røros Copper Works

The Røros Copper Works (Norwegian: Røros kobberverk) was a copper mining company based in the town (bergstad) of Røros in what is now Røros Municipality in Trøndelag county, Norway. The mines operated from 1644 until 1977. The Crown designated the area as a bergstad in 1647 and put Joachim Irgens von Westervick in charge, including rights to forests and water resources within a circular diameter of 90 kilometres (56 mi) around the town. The local farmers were given working obligations, such as transport and charcoal production for the copper works. Among the mines were the Storwartz mines, Hestkletten, Christianus Qvintus, Olavsgruven, Kongens Gruve, and Christianus Sextus. During its operation a total of 110,000 tonnes (110,000 long tons; 120,000 short tons) of copper and 525,000 tonnes (517,000 long tons; 579,000 short tons) of pyrites was produced.

== History ==
In 1644, the general manager of the mine at Kongsberg gave permission to exploit one lode of copper in the mountains near Rauhaammaaren. Storvola and Gamle Storwartz became some of the company's most important mines. Nordgruve, another important mining area, was situated to the north east of the town of Røros.

In 1685, Røros discovered a considerable amount of associated silver mines. The mining activity lasted for about 40 years, and a total of 1,350 tonnes (1,330 long tons; 1,490 short tons) of sterling silver was mined. This provided considerable revenue for the Danish-Norwegian treasury to support King Frederick IV in building the palace of Solbjerg.

From 1740 onwards, there was a period of greatness for the Røros Copper Works with several mines yielding well. Due to the funding of the Oldenburg royal family, the scale of the Leros silver mine and copper mine expanded. As the mine is close to Trondheim and at a lower latitude, the ore output is much higher than Scandinavia Falun. The rich income of the mining area also prompted the royal family to repeatedly ask for an expansion of the mining. Dynamite was utilised from 1870 and later drilling machines. The electrical generating station built high-tension power lines to supply the mines, starting in 1897. The Bessemer process was introduced at the end of the 1800s. The Rørosbanen railway line was completed in 1877. High prices for both copper and zinc gave good results, but then the prices dropped and there were several years with large losses. After 333 years, mining activity in Røros Municipality ceased in 1977.

== Geology ==
This region consists of Cambro-Silurian sedimentary rocks (i.e., rocks from the Cambrian, Ordovician and Silurian periods, formed 545 to 417 million years before the present) that are highly metamorphosed by the Caledonian orogeny about 490 to 390 million years ago (Ma). The mountain formation created extensive folding with numerous anticlines and synclines across much of Norway. In addition to Cambrosilurian shales, there are numerous volcanic intrusive sills and dikes. Metal deposits are formed by hydrothermal interaction of fluids between volcanic and surrounding rocks, concentrating copper sulfates in ore zones.
