= Stangvik Municipality =

Former municipality in Møre og Romsdal, Norway

Stangvik Municipality Stangvik herred
- Former municipality
- Stangvig herred (historic name)
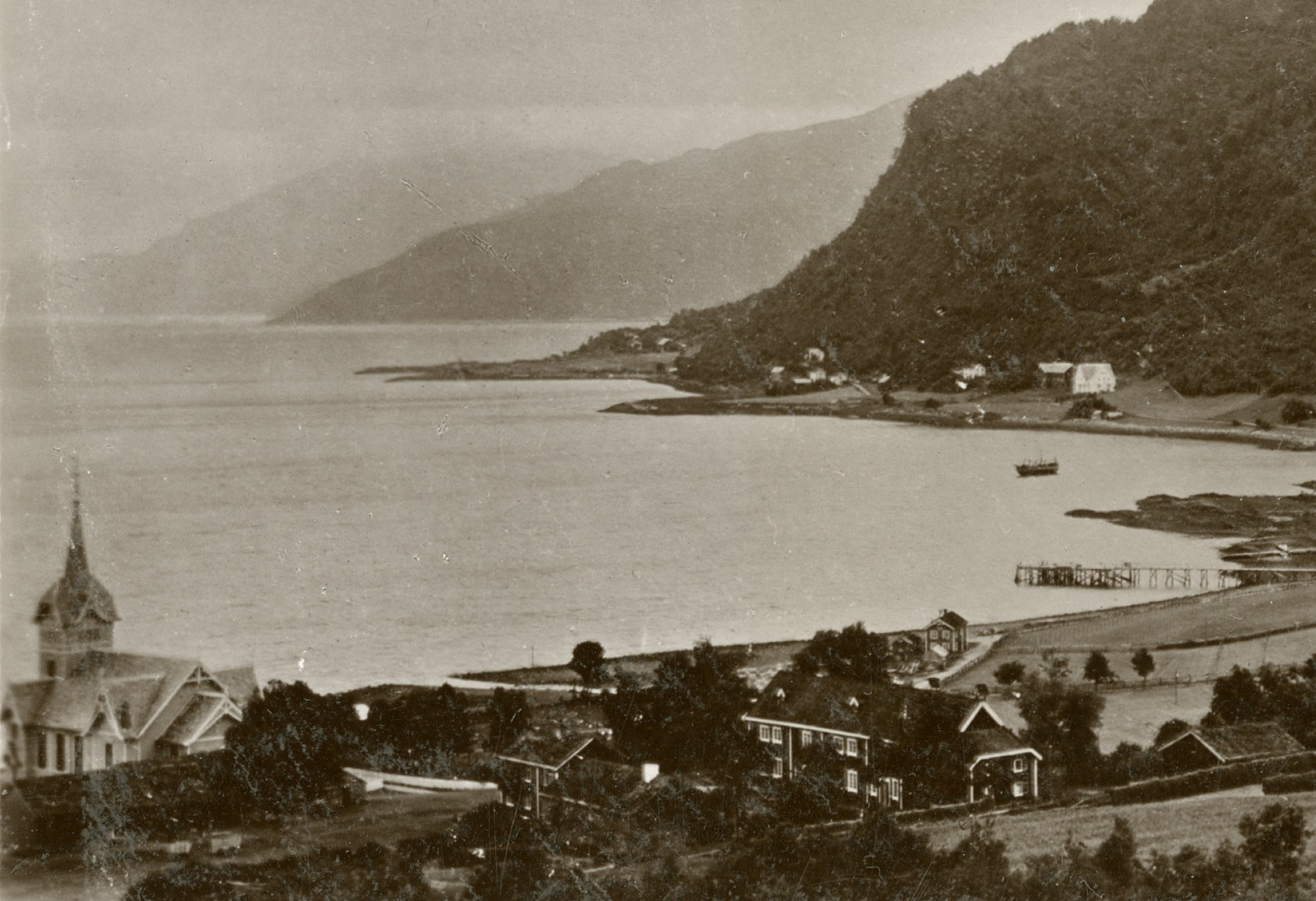
- View of the village of Stangvik (early 1900s)

- Møre og Romsdal within Norway

- Stangvik within Møre og Romsdal
- Coordinates: 62°55′10″N 08°28′05″E
- Country: Norway
- County: Møre og Romsdal
- District: Nordmøre
- Established: 1 Jan 1838
  - Created as: Formannskapsdistrikt
- Disestablished: 1 Jan 1965
  - Succeeded by: Surnadal Municipality and Sunndal Municipality
- Administrative centre: Stangvik

Government
  - Mayor (1963–1964): Ola Torhus (Ap)

Area (upon dissolution)
  - Total: 510.99 km^{2} (197.29 sq mi)
  - Rank: #203 in Norway
- Highest elevation: 1,622 m (5,322 ft)

Population (1964)
  - Total: 1,947
  - Rank: #400 in Norway
  - Density: 3.8/km^{2} (9.8/sq mi)
  - Change (10 years): ▼ −16.1%
- Demonym: Stangvikgjelding

Official language
  - Norwegian form: Nynorsk
- Time zone: UTC+01:00 (CET)
  - Summer (DST): UTC+02:00 (CEST)
- ISO 3166 code: NO-1564

Stangvik is a former municipality in Møre og Romsdal county, Norway. The 511-square-kilometre (197 sq mi) municipality existed from 1838 until its dissolution in 1965. The municipality of Stangvik (historically spelled Stangvig) encompassed much of the area surrounding the Trongfjorden and the smaller fjords that branch off of it such as the Ålvundfjorden, Stangvikfjorden, and Todalsfjorden. The municipality was mostly located in what is now Surnadal Municipality and also small portions of what is now Sunndal Municipality and Tingvoll Municipality. The administrative centre of the municipality was the village of Stangvik where Stangvik Church is located.

Prior to its dissolution in 1965, the 511-square-kilometre (197 sq mi) municipality was the 203rd largest by area out of the 525 municipalities in Norway. Stangvik Municipality was the 400th most populous municipality in Norway with a population of about 1,947. The municipality's population density was 3.8 inhabitants per square kilometre (9.8/sq mi) and its population had decreased by 16.1% over the previous 10-year period.

== General information ==
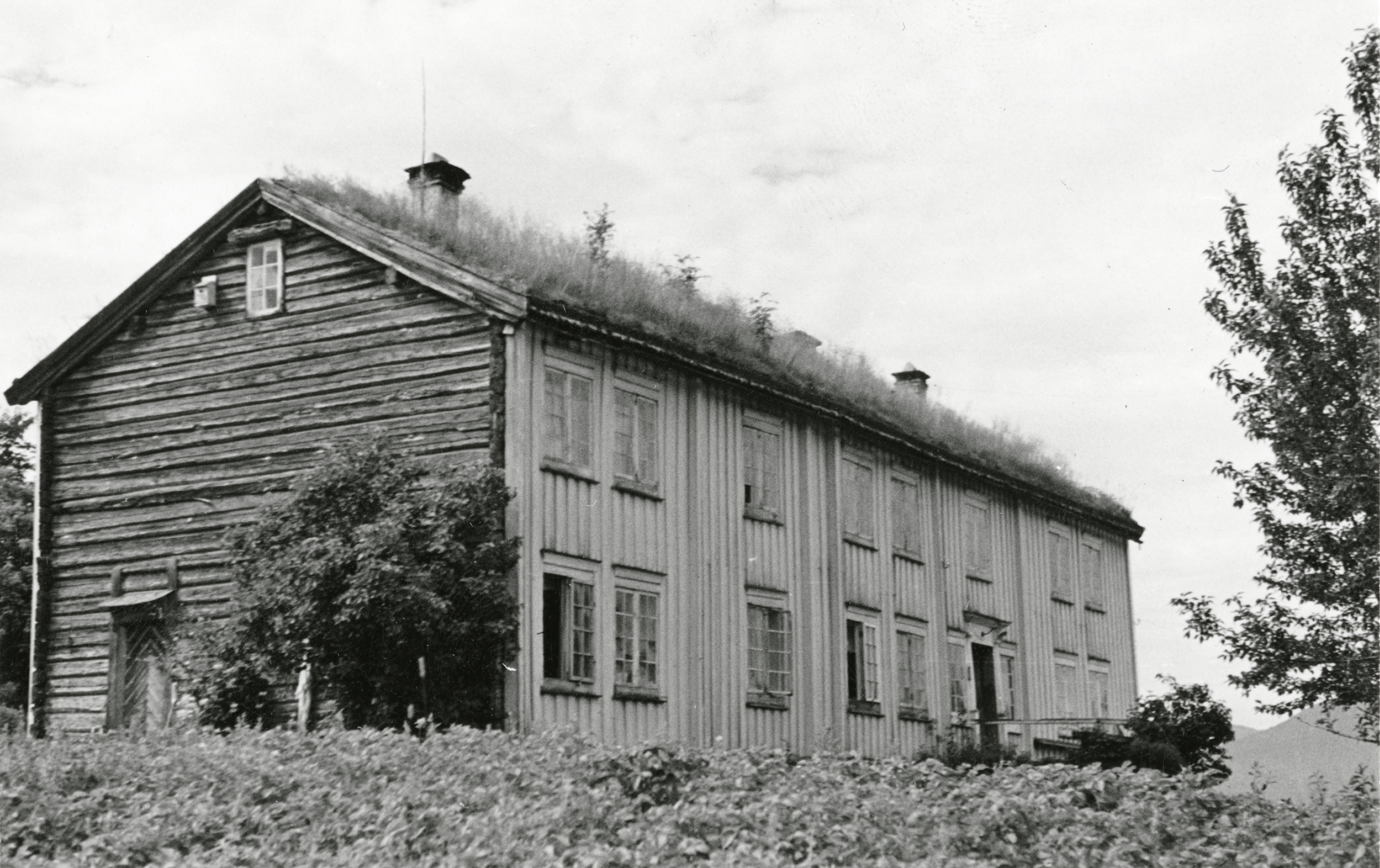
View of an old building in Søyset, Stangvik

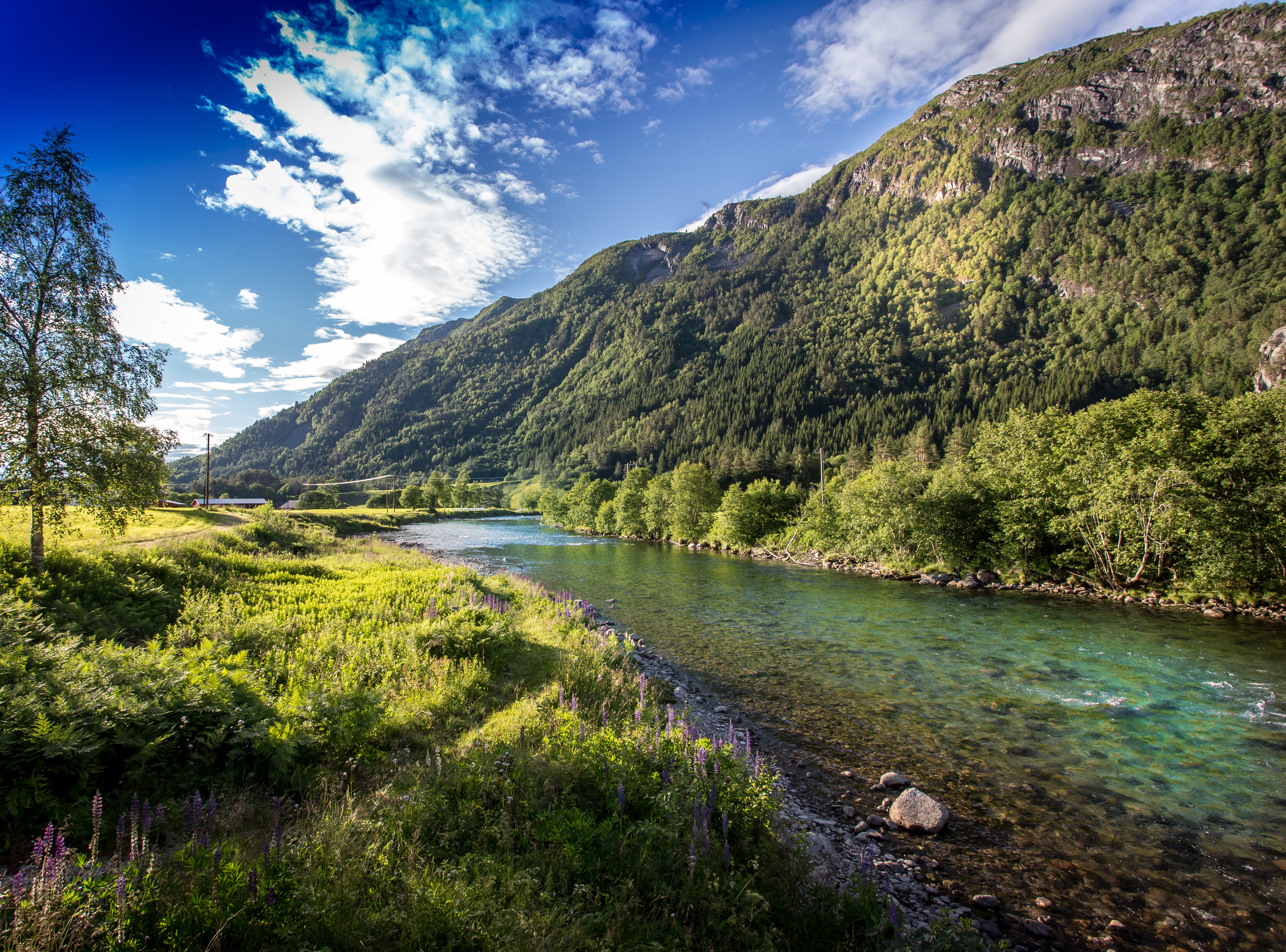
View of the Toåa river in southern Stangvik

The municipality of Stangvig was established on 1 January 1838 (see formannskapsdistrikt law). According to the 1865 census, the municipality had a population of 2,619. On 1 January 1874, a part of Stangvik Municipality (population: 61) was moved to neighboring Tingvoll Municipality. Then on 1 January 1877, another part of Stangvik Municipality (population: 50) was moved to Surnadal Municipality.

In 1879, parts of Surnadal Municipality (population: 83) and Halsa Municipality (population: 279) were moved to Stangvik Municipality. On 1 January 1886, the Møklegjerdet farm (population: 29), just west of Glærem, was transferred from Stangvik Municipality to Surnadal Municipality. On 1 January 1897, the Sjøflot farm (population: 27), also just west of Glærem, was transferred from Stangvik Municipality to Surnadal Municipality. On 1 May 1895, the area around the Åsskardfjorden and the Hamnesfjorden in the northern part of the municipality was split off to create the new Aasgaard Municipality, leaving Stangvik Municipality with 2,354 inhabitants.

During the 1960s, there were many municipal mergers across Norway due to the work of the Schei Committee. On 1 January 1965, Stangvik Municipality ceased to exist. The district around the village of Ålvund and the Ålvundfjorden (population: 508) was moved to the neighboring Sunndal Municipality, the district around the villages of Åsprong and Sandnes (population: 26) was moved to the neighboring Tingvoll Municipality, and the rest of Stangvik Municipality (population: 1,386), along with all of Åsskard Municipality, was merged into Surnadal Municipality.

=== Name ===
The municipality (originally the parish) is named after the old Stangvik farm (Old Norse: Stangarvík) since the first Stangvik Church was built there. The first element is derived from the genitive case of the word stǫng which means "staff" or "pole". This is likely referring to the very straight shape of the shoreline in this area (rather unusual for the very craggy shoreline in western Norway). The last element is vík which means "bay" or "cove".

=== Churches ===
The Church of Norway had two parishes (sokn) within Stangvik Municipality. At the time of the municipal dissolution, it was part of the Stangvik prestegjeld and the Indre Nordmøre prosti (deanery) in the Diocese of Nidaros.

Churches in Stangvik Municipality
Parish (sokn)	Church name	Location of the church	Year built
Stangvik	Stangvik Church	Stangvik	1896
Todal	Todal Church	Todalsøra	1861

== Geography ==
The municipality encompassed much of the area surrounding the Trongfjorden and the smaller fjords that branch off of it such as the Ålvundfjorden, Stangvikfjorden, and Todalsfjorden. The highest point in the municipality was the 1,622-metre (5,322 ft) tall mountain Neådalssnota, on the border with Surnadal Municipality. Åsskard Municipality was to the north, Surnadal Municipality was to the east, Oppdal Municipality (in Sør-Trøndelag county) to the southeast, Ålvundeid Municipality was to the southwest, and Tingvoll Municipality was to the west.

== Government ==
While it existed, Stangvik Municipality was responsible for primary education (through 10th grade), outpatient health services, senior citizen services, welfare and other social services, zoning, economic development, and municipal roads and utilities. The municipality was governed by a municipal council of directly elected representatives. The mayor was indirectly elected by a vote of the municipal council. The municipality was under the jurisdiction of the Frostating Court of Appeal.

=== Municipal council ===
The municipal council (Herredsstyre) of Stangvik Municipality was made up of 21 representatives that were elected to four-year terms. The tables below show the historical composition of the council by political party.

Stangvik heradsstyre 1963–1964
Party name (in Nynorsk)	Number of representatives
Labour Party (Arbeidarpartiet)	11
Christian Democratic Party (Kristeleg Folkeparti)	3
Centre Party (Senterpartiet)	7
Total number of members:	21
Note: On 1 January 1965, Stangvik Municipality was divided between Tingvoll Municipality, Surnadal Municipality, and Sunndal Municipality.

Stangvik heradsstyre 1959–1963
Party name (in Nynorsk)	Number of representatives
Labour Party (Arbeidarpartiet)	9
Christian Democratic Party (Kristeleg Folkeparti)	3
Centre Party (Senterpartiet)	7
Local List(s) (Lokale lister)	2
Total number of members:	21

Stangvik heradsstyre 1955–1959
Party name (in Nynorsk)	Number of representatives
Labour Party (Arbeidarpartiet)	10
Joint List(s) of Non-Socialist Parties (Borgarlege Felleslister)	11
Total number of members:	21

Stangvik heradsstyre 1951–1955
Party name (in Nynorsk)	Number of representatives
Labour Party (Arbeidarpartiet)	12
Joint List(s) of Non-Socialist Parties (Borgarlege Felleslister)	12
Total number of members:	24

Stangvik heradsstyre 1947–1951
Party name (in Nynorsk)	Number of representatives
Labour Party (Arbeidarpartiet)	7
Joint List(s) of Non-Socialist Parties (Borgarlege Felleslister)	9
Total number of members:	16

Stangvik heradsstyre 1945–1947
Party name (in Nynorsk)	Number of representatives
Labour Party (Arbeidarpartiet)	11
Local List(s) (Lokale lister)	13
Total number of members:	24

Stangvik heradsstyre 1937–1941*
Party name (in Nynorsk)	Number of representatives
Labour Party (Arbeidarpartiet)	13
Joint list of the Farmers' Party (Bondepartiet) and the Liberal Party (Venstre)	6
Joint List(s) of Non-Socialist Parties (Borgarlege Felleslister)	5
Total number of members:	24
Note: Due to the German occupation of Norway during World War II, no elections were held for new municipal councils until after the war ended in 1945.

=== Mayors ===
The mayor (Nynorsk: ordførar) of Stangvik Municipality was the political leader of the municipality and the chairperson of the municipal council. The following people have held this position:

- 1838–1843: Nils Smiseth
- 1844–1845: Jakob Tokle
- 1846–1847: Rev. Fr. Heyerdahl
- 1848–1849: Lars L. Mo
- 1850–1851: Bersvend M. Røkkum
- 1852–1853: Bersvend Brøske
- 1854–1857: Erik Kaarvatn
- 1858–1877: Christian Bruseth
- 1878–1883: Bersvend Brøske
- 1884–1885: Lars J. Bæverfjord
- 1886–1889: Bersvend Brøske
- 1890–1893: Lars L. Mo
- 1894–1907: Lars Røkkum
- 1907–1916: Peder J. Kvande
- 1917–1922: Kristian Bruseth
- 1923–1937: Josva Halle
- 1937–1941: Erling Torhus (Ap)
- 1945–1945: Josva Halle
- 1945–1947: Albert Halseth
- 1947–1955: Anders J. Halset
- 1955–1963: Olav T. Halle (Bp)
- 1963–1964: Ola Torhus (Ap)

== See also ==
- List of former municipalities of Norway
