= Stangvik (disambiguation) =

Stangvik may refer to:

== Places ==
- Stangvik, a village in Surnadal Municipality in Møre og Romsdal County, Norway.
- Stangvik Municipality, a former municipality (1838–1965) in Møre og Romsdal County, Norway
- Stangvik Church, a parish church in Surnadal Municipality in Møre og Romsdal County, Norway

== Places ==
- Ine Karlsen Stangvik (born 1990), a Norwegian handball player
- Inge Stangvik, an artist for Hot Club Records
