= Henning Sommerro =

Norwegian musician (born 1952)

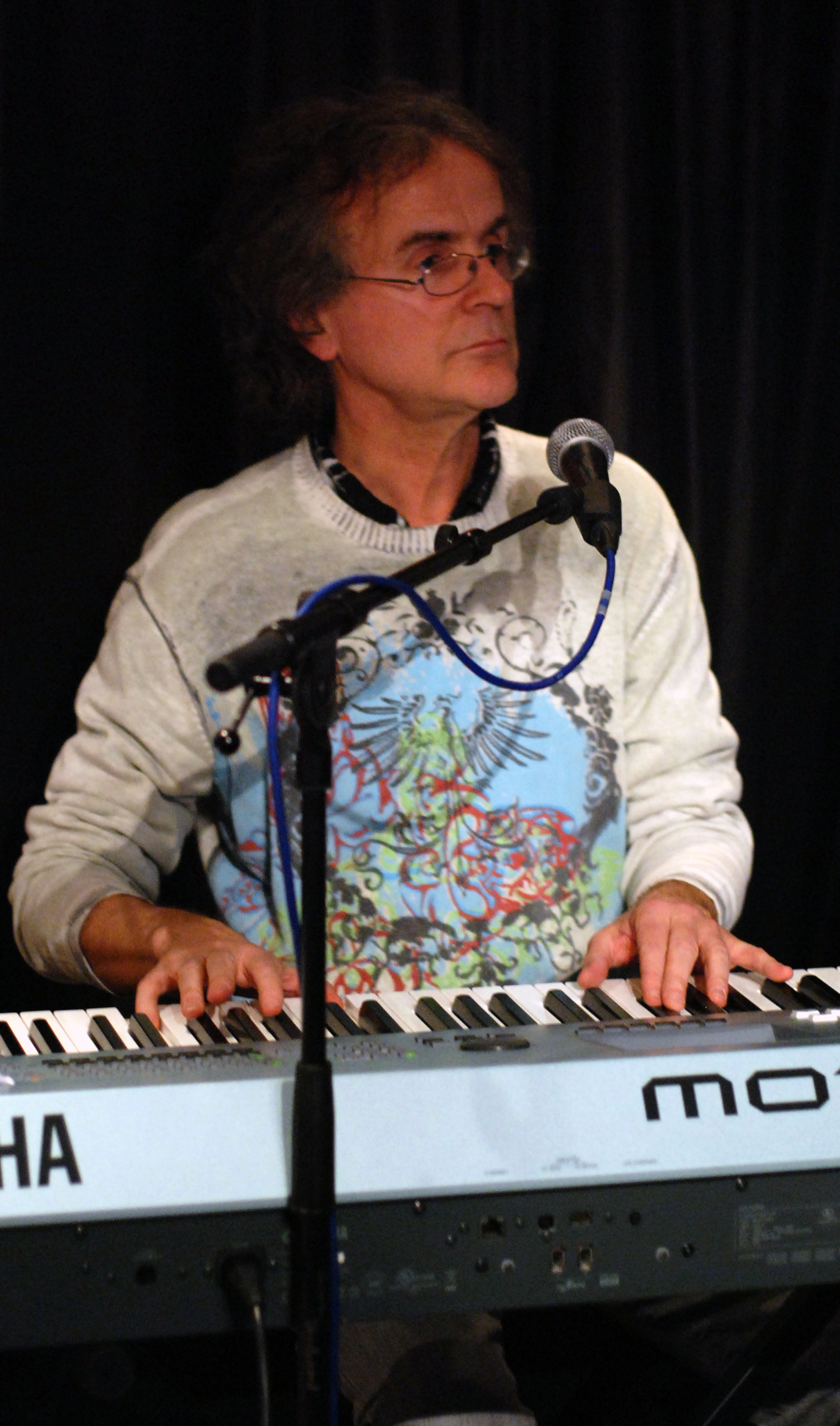
Henning Sommerro

Henning Sommerro (born 3 May 1952 in Surnadal Municipality) is a Norwegian musician, composer and professor at NTNU.

== Biography ==
Sommerro grew up on the Sommerro farm at Skei in Surnadal Municipality. His name became widely known in 1977 when the folk music group Vårsøg released their recording of Hans Hyldbakk’s poem Vårsøg.

Sommerro had his first lessons in organ and piano at the age of sixteen at the Music Conservatory in Trondheim. He studied organ there from 1970–1974, and from 1974–1976 he was organist in the villages of Stangvik and Todalen. From 1976–1977 he studied organ and composition at the music academy in Basel, and in 1978 he became director of music at the Teatret Vårt theatre in Molde. From 1985–1990 he was director of music at Trøndelag Teater. Additionally in the years 1986–1988 he was a music consultant for Norwegian radio (NRK P2). Since 1990 he has been a professor at the Department of Music of the Norwegian University of Science and Technology (formerly the Trøndelag Musikkonservatorium).

Sommerro’s performing career began in his youth as a member of the band The Tramps which later changed its name to Mad Movies. In 1977 he made his recording début with the folksong group Vårsøg, which released three records. Sommerro has since that time performed on his own, with various groups, and as an accompanist for, among others, Erik Bye, Sigmund Groven, Geirr Lystrup, Halvdan Sivertsen, Bjørn Alterhaug, Dalakopa, Arve Tellefsen, John Pål Inderberg, Palle Mikkelborg, Åge Aleksandersen, Arne Domnerus, Aly Bain, and Choeur Grégorien de Paris.

Henning Sommerro has written music for over 140 different theatre and film productions. Of these should be mentioned Kjærleikens ferjereiser (film, 1979); An-Magritt (1988, nominated for the Nordic Council Music Prize 2008); Wayfarers (Landstrykere, 1989); the Steinvikholmen opera Olav Engelbrektsson (1993); the sacred operas Jesu siste dager (1997) and Eystein av Nidaros; Partisan Requiem (2000); the folk music ("gammeldans") mass Vindens hjul (1994). He has also set to music poetry by Hans Hyldbakk and hymns by Edvard Hoem.

== Discography ==
- 1977 – Vårsøg with the group Vårsøg
- 1978 – Sola e komma with Vårsøg
- 1978 – Av moll er du komen, til dur skal du bli with Vårsøg and the choir SKRUK
- 1981 – Litt tå meg
- 1986 – Neonlys på Ivar Aasen
- 1992 – Vårsøg with Trondheim Symphony Orchestra
- 1996 – Svarrabærje
- 1996 – Follow the Moonstone Aly Bain/The Scottish BT Ensemble
- 1996 – Vindens hjul
- 2001 – Partisan Requiem
- 2006 – Sullabullyam
- 2009 – Magnificat
- 2009 – Two we go together with Gunnar Andreas Berg
- 2013 – Vintereple
- 2013 – Lussi Langnatt
- 2015 – EDDA TrondheimSolistene and Trondheim Wind Quintet
- 2015 – Vebju together with Anders Larsen
- 2018 – Ujamaa with Trondheim Symphony Orchestra
- 2019 – Piano Mona Spigseth and TrondheimSolistene
- 2021 – Å dikte together with Øyvind Gimse
- 2023 - Borders with Trondheim Symphony Orchestra
- 2024 - People of the book Ensemble/Trondheimsolistene

== Awards ==
- 1978 – Prøysenprisen
- 1979 – Spellemannprisen 1979 for Sola e komma (as a member of the group Vårsøg)
- 1979 – Møre og Romsdal county cultural prize
- 1982 – Special prize awarded by the jury at Spellemannprisen 1981
- 1986 – Gammeleng-prisen in the category "studio"
- 1987 – Spellmannprisen 1986 for Neonlys på Ivar Aasen
- 1987 – Sør-Trøndelag county cultural prize
- 1994 – Bræinprisen
- 1997 – The Kardemomme award
- 2011 – Norsk Korforbund prize
- 2015 – Egil Storbekkens Musicprize

== Bibliography ==
- Bjørn Aksdal. "Henning Sommerro" in Norsk biografisk leksikon
- Arild Hoksnes. Samtaler med Sommerro, 1992
