= Bøverfjorden =

Village in Surnadal Municipality, Norway

Bøverfjorden Bæverfjord, Bøverfjord
- Village
- Interactive map of Bøverfjorden
- Location within Møre og Romsdal Location within Norway
- Coordinates: 63°1′29″N 8°35′33″E
- Country: Norway
- Region: Western Norway
- County: Møre og Romsdal
- District: Nordmøre
- Municipality: Surnadal Municipality
- Elevation: 6 m (20 ft)
- Time zone: UTC+01:00 (CET)
  - Summer (DST): UTC+02:00 (CEST)
- Post Code: 6644 Bæverfjord

Bøverfjorden (unofficial spellings: Bæverfjord or Bøverfjord) is a village in Surnadal Municipality in Møre og Romsdal county, Norway. It lies on the shore of Hamnesfjord along County Road 65 where the Bøvra River empties into the fjord. The village of Åsskard lies about 5 kilometres (3.1 mi) to the west the villages of Surnadalsøra and Skei lie about 10 kilometres (6.2 mi) to the southeast.

== Name ==
Locally, the name of the village is pronounced Bøffjorn. The name is derived from Old Norse word Bifrarfjǫrðr which means 'beaver fjord' with substitution of the Norse first element by the Low German word bever.
