= Åsskard Municipality =

Former municipality in Møre og Romsdal, Norway

Åsskard Municipality Åsskard herred
- Former municipality
- Aasskard herred (historic name); Aasgaard herred (historic name)
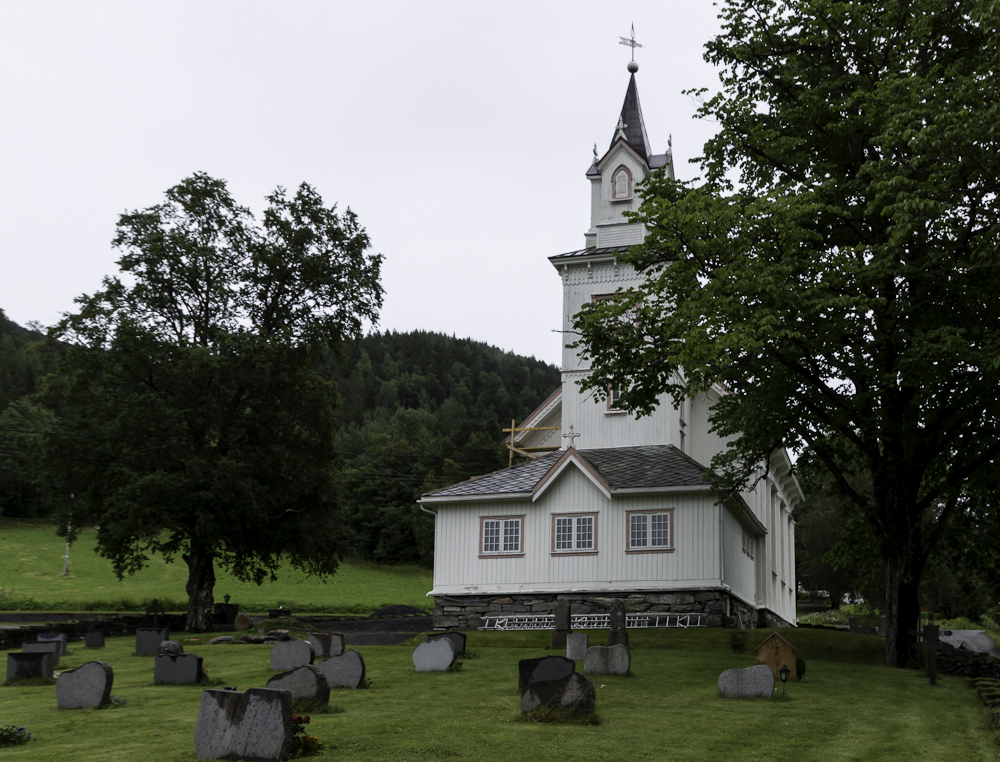
- View of the local church

- Møre og Romsdal within Norway

- Åsskard within Møre og Romsdal
- Coordinates: 63°01′06″N 08°29′41″E
- Country: Norway
- County: Møre og Romsdal
- District: Nordmøre
- Established: 1 May 1895
  - Preceded by: Stangvik Municipality
- Disestablished: 1 Jan 1965
  - Succeeded by: Surnadal Municipality
- Administrative centre: Åsskard

Government
  - Mayor (1963–1964): Ola J. Bævre (Sp)

Area (upon dissolution)
  - Total: 149.1 km^{2} (57.6 sq mi)
  - Rank: #369 in Norway
- Highest elevation: 978 m (3,209 ft)

Population (1964)
  - Total: 1,015
  - Rank: #483 in Norway
  - Density: 6.8/km^{2} (18/sq mi)
  - Change (10 years): ▼ −7.2%
- Demonym: Åsskardsbygg

Official language
  - Norwegian form: Neutral
- Time zone: UTC+01:00 (CET)
  - Summer (DST): UTC+02:00 (CEST)
- ISO 3166 code: NO-1565

Åsskard is a former municipality in Møre og Romsdal county, Norway. The 149-square-kilometre (58 sq mi) municipality existed from 1895 until its dissolution in 1965. It was located in what is now the northern part of Surnadal Municipality. The former municipality of Åsskard (historically spelled Aasgaard) included the area around the Åsskardfjorden, north of the Hamnesfjorden, and east of the Trongfjorden. The administrative centre was the village of Åsskard where the Åsskard Church is located.

Prior to its dissolution in 1965, the 149-square-kilometre (58 sq mi) municipality was the 369th largest by area out of the 525 municipalities in Norway. Åsskard Municipality was the 483rd most populous municipality in Norway with a population of about 1,015. The municipality's population density was 6.8 inhabitants per square kilometre (18/sq mi) and its population had decreased by 7.2% over the previous 10-year period.

== General information ==
The municipality of Aasgaard was established on 1 May 1895 when it was separated from the large Stangvik Municipality. It had an initial population of 629. On 1 July 1915, a southern district of Halsa Municipality (population: 114) was transferred to Aasgaard Municipality. The spelling of the name was later changed to Åsskard Municipality. During the 1960s, there were many municipal mergers across Norway due to the work of the Schei Committee. On 1 January 1965, Åsskard Municipality (population: 1,014) was merged with most of Stangvik Municipality (population: 1,386) and Surnadal Municipality (population: 3,534) to form a new, larger Surnadal Municipality.

=== Name ===
The municipality (originally the parish) is named after the old Åsskard farm (Old Norse: Ásskarð) since the first Åsskard Church was built there. The first element is áss which means "rocky ridge" or "hill". The last element is skarð which means "gap" or "pass" between hills or mountains. This is likely referring to the fact that the Åsskard farm was situated in a narrow, low area between some mountains on the isthmus between the Åsskardfjorden and the Hamnesfjorden.

Historically, the name of the municipality was spelled Aasgaard. On 3 November 1917, a royal resolution changed the spelling of the name of the municipality to Aasskard, bringing it back to a modern version of the Old Norse spelling. On 21 December 1917, a royal resolution enacted the 1917 Norwegian language reforms. Prior to this change, the name was spelled Aasskard with the digraph "Aa", and after this reform, the name was spelled Åsskard, using the letter Å instead.

=== Churches ===
The Church of Norway had one parish (sokn) within Åsskard Municipality. At the time of the municipal dissolution, it was part of the Stangvik prestegjeld and the Indre Nordmøre prosti (deanery) in the Diocese of Nidaros.

Churches in Åsskard Municipality
Parish (sokn)	Church name	Location of the church	Year built
Åsskard	Åsskard Church	Åsskard	1876

== Geography ==
The municipality included the area around the Åsskardfjorden, north of the Hamnesfjorden, and east of the Trongfjorden. The highest point in the municipality was the 978-metre (3,209 ft) tall mountain Hjelmen, on the border with Valsøyfjord Municipality. Halsa Municipality, Valsøyfjord Municipality, and Aure Municipality were located to the north, Surnadal Municipality and Stangvik Municipality were to the south, and Tingvoll Municipality was to the west.

== Government ==
While it existed, Åsskard Municipality was responsible for primary education (through 10th grade), outpatient health services, senior citizen services, welfare and other social services, zoning, economic development, and municipal roads and utilities. The municipality was governed by a municipal council of directly elected representatives. The mayor was indirectly elected by a vote of the municipal council. The municipality was under the jurisdiction of the Frostating Court of Appeal.

=== Municipal council ===
The municipal council (Heradsstyre) of Åsskard Municipality was made up of 13 representatives that were elected to four-year terms. The tables below show the historical composition of the council by political party.

Åsskard herredsstyre 1963–1964
Party name (in Norwegian)	Number of representatives
Labour Party (Arbeiderpartiet)	6
Christian Democratic Party (Kristelig Folkeparti)	2
Centre Party (Senterpartiet)	5
Total number of members:	13
Note: On 1 January 1965, Åsskard Municipality became part of Surnadal Municipality.

Åsskard herredsstyre 1959–1963
Party name (in Norwegian)	Number of representatives
Labour Party (Arbeiderpartiet)	5
Christian Democratic Party (Kristelig Folkeparti)	2
Centre Party (Senterpartiet)	6
Total number of members:	13

Åsskard herredsstyre 1955–1959
Party name (in Norwegian)	Number of representatives
Labour Party (Arbeiderpartiet)	5
Christian Democratic Party (Kristelig Folkeparti)	2
Joint List(s) of Non-Socialist Parties (Borgerlige Felleslister)	6
Total number of members:	13

Åsskard herredsstyre 1951–1955
Party name (in Norwegian)	Number of representatives
Labour Party (Arbeiderpartiet)	4
Christian Democratic Party (Kristelig Folkeparti)	2
Joint List(s) of Non-Socialist Parties (Borgerlige Felleslister)	6
Total number of members:	12

Åsskard herredsstyre 1947–1951
Party name (in Norwegian)	Number of representatives
Labour Party (Arbeiderpartiet)	5
Christian Democratic Party (Kristelig Folkeparti)	2
Local List(s) (Lokale lister)	5
Total number of members:	12

Åsskard herredsstyre 1945–1947
Party name (in Norwegian)	Number of representatives
Labour Party (Arbeiderpartiet)	5
Local List(s) (Lokale lister)	7
Total number of members:	12

Åsskard herredsstyre 1937–1941*
Party name (in Norwegian)	Number of representatives
Labour Party (Arbeiderpartiet)	5
Joint List(s) of Non-Socialist Parties (Borgerlige Felleslister)	5
Local List(s) (Lokale lister)	2
Total number of members:	12
Note: Due to the German occupation of Norway during World War II, no elections were held for new municipal councils until after the war ended in 1945.

=== Mayors ===
The mayor (Norwegian: ordfører) of Åsskard Municipality was the political leader of the municipality and the chairperson of the municipal council. The following people have held this position:

- 1895–1898: Lars J. Bæverfjord
- 1899–1902: Halstein E. Hakstad
- 1903–1916: A.O. Sollid
- 1916–1926: Ole Snekvik
- 1926–1937: Sivert Pedersen Bæverfjord
- 1938–1941: Peder J. Bø
- 1945–1946: Peder J. Bø
- 1947–1955: Ola J. Bævre (Bp)
- 1955–1963: Jon Enge
- 1963–1964: Ola J. Bævre (Sp)

== See also ==
- List of former municipalities of Norway
