= Hamnesfjorden =

Fjord in Møre og Romsdal, Norway

- Interactive map of the fjord
- Location: Møre og Romsdal county, Norway
- Coordinates: 62.9800°N 8.4521°E
- Type: Fjord
- Basin countries: Norway
- Max. length: 9 kilometres (5.6 mi)

Hamnesfjorden is a fjord in Surnadal Municipality in Møre og Romsdal county, Norway. The 9-kilometre (5.6 mi) long fjord begins at the mouth of the Bøvra River at the village of Bøverfjorden, just east of the village of Åsskard, about 10 kilometres (6.2 mi) northwest of the villages of Sylte, Skei, and Surnadalsøra. The fjord flows west into the main Trongfjorden. There are few settlements along the fjord due to the steep mountainsides along the fjord.

== See also ==
- List of Norwegian fjords
