= Bøvra =

Bøvra Bævra
- Location of the river Bøvra (Trøndelag) Bøvra (Norway)

Location
- Country: Norway
- Counties: Møre og Romsdal, Trøndelag
- Municipalities: Surnadal Municipality, Rindal Municipality, Heim Municipality

Physical characteristics
- Source: Bjørnadalen
  - location: Heim Municipality, Trøndelag
  - coordinates: 63.1519271°N 8.9040451°E
  - elevation: 590 metres (1,940 ft)
- 2nd source: Holavatnet
  - location: Rindal Municipality, Trøndelag
  - coordinates: 63.13394°N 8.9721179°E
  - elevation: 529 metres (1,736 ft)
- Mouth: Hamnesfjord
  - location: Bøverfjorden, Surnadal Municipality
  - coordinates: 63.0212293°N 8.590772°E
  - elevation: 0 metres (0 ft)
- Length: 27 km (17 mi)
- Basin size: 243 km^{2} (94 sq mi)

Basin features
- Tributaries
  - left: Svorka, Litlbævra
  - right: Toreseterelva, Neverholtelva, Gravvollsagelva, Geitåa, Skvættå

The Bøvra (unofficially: Bævra) is a river in Surnadal Municipality in Møre og Romsdal county and in Rindal Municipality and Heim Municipality in Trøndelag county, Norway. The 27-kilometre (17 mi) long river runs through the Bøver Valley and empties into Hamnesfjord at the village of Bøverfjorden, where the high-water mark lies 650 meters (2,130 ft) upstream from the mouth of the river. Its drainage basin covers 243 square kilometers (94 sq mi) and receives about 1,500 millimeters (59 in) of precipitation annually.

The main river has a natural salmon population up to 20 kilometers (12 mi) from the fjord, and salmon can also be found 1 kilometer (0.62 mi) into the Svorka River, a tributary. After regulation of the river, salmon fishing has been limited to downstream from the Svorka power station. In 1986, salmon flukes, a parasite, were detected and the river was treated with rotenone in 1986 and 1989. After the treatment, the river was reopened for fishing in 1994. In addition to salmon, sea trout also travel up the river.

The lower part of the Bøvra Valley is a U-shaped valley and the course of the river creates meanders. Upstream, from the Bjørnåssetra farm to the Brattset farm, the river runs through a relatively narrow canyon for a length of about 5 kilometers (3.1 mi).

The watercourse was regulated in 1963 and it has several power stations along it, including the Svorka Power Station. Due to the regulation, water flow was reduced in two tributaries, the Svorka and Litlbævra (or Lille-Bøvra). Around 43% of the river's catchment area is used for the Svorka Power Station. Below the Svorka Power Station and 3.7 kilometers (2.3 mi) from the fjord the total water flow is the same as before the regulation, but varies with the operation of the power plant and the water flow becomes very small when the power plant stops completely. The Nordsvorka Power Station came into operation in 2007. The water flow in the upper part of the river between the mouth of the Litlbævra and the Svorka Power Station has also been greatly reduced as a result of regulation.

According to Amund Helland, the fjord was formerly called Bifrafjǫrðr after the river, which was formerly called Bifr.

== See also ==
- List of rivers in Norway
