= Ole Andreas Lindeman =

Norwegian musician (1769–1857)

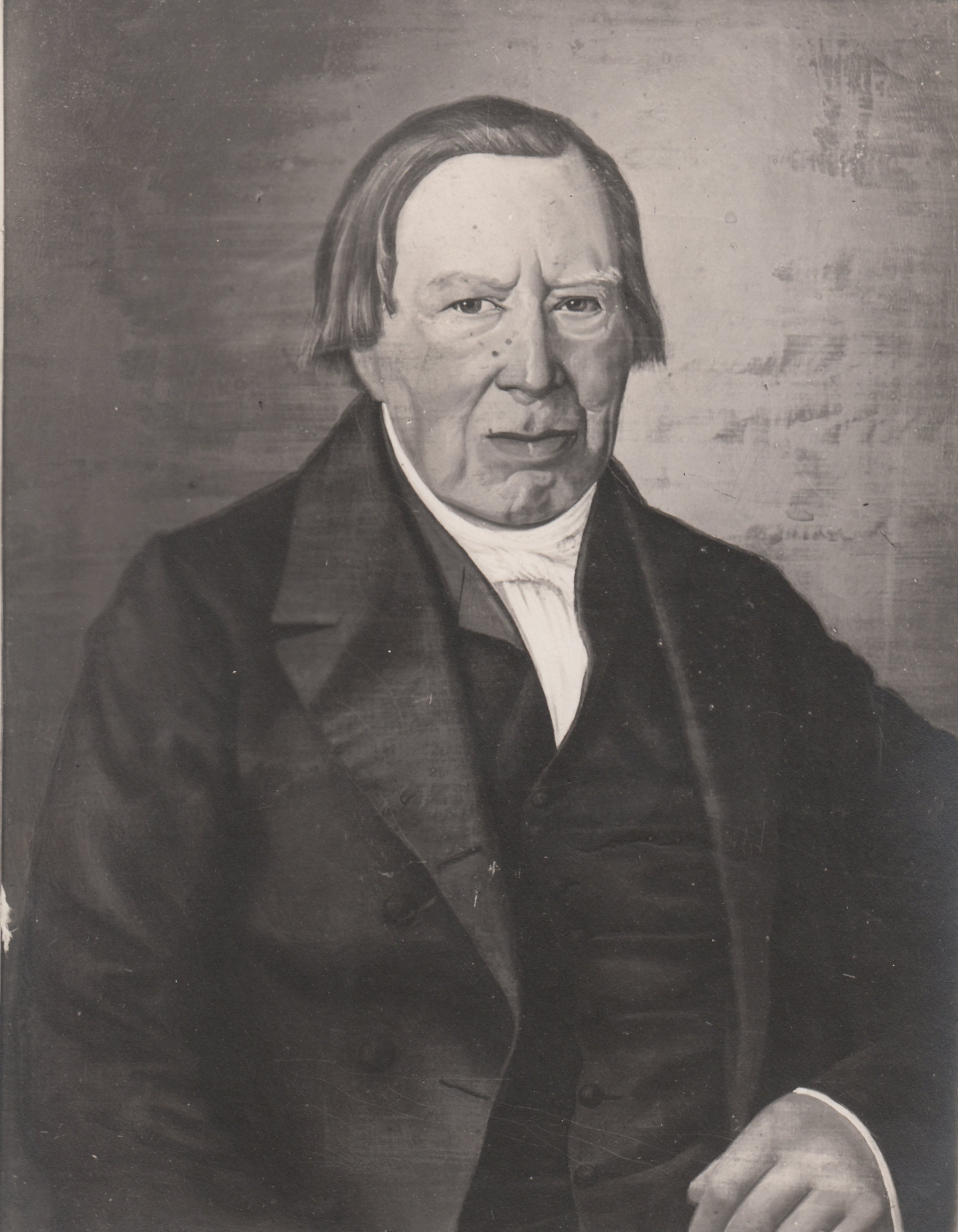
Ole Andreas Lindeman

Ole Andreas Lindeman (17 January 1769 – 26 February 1857) was a Norwegian musician, organist, composer and music educator.

He was born in the Øye Church parish (now in Surnadal Municipality), Norway. After graduating from Trondheim Cathedral School, Lindeman attended the University of Copenhagen where first he studied law. He was subsequently a music student of Danish- Norwegian composer and music theorist, Israel Gottlieb Wernicke (1755-1836).

Following a request from Bishop Johan Christian Schønheyder, Lindeman moved to Trondheim to become organist at Vår Frue Church. Lindeman retained the organist position until his death 1857 having served as an organist in Trondheim in more than 50 years. During that time, he organized many concerts, composed songs and collected Norwegian folk tunes. He also taught others, among them Thomas Tellefsen, who settled in Paris and became a notable pianist and composer.

In 1831, Lindeman publish the hymnal Udvalg af Psalmer uddragne af den Evangelisk-christelige Psalmebog, i sær til Brug for den skolesøgende Ungdom. Halv-hundrede Fjeldmelodier harmoniserede for Mandsstemmer and the three volumes of Ældre og nyere norske Fjeldmelodier were published separately between 1853–1867. He was the father of five sons, including Ludvig Mathias Lindeman who served as cantor and organist at Oslo Cathedral.
