= Øye Church =

Church in Møre og Romsdal, Norway

- Øye kyrkje
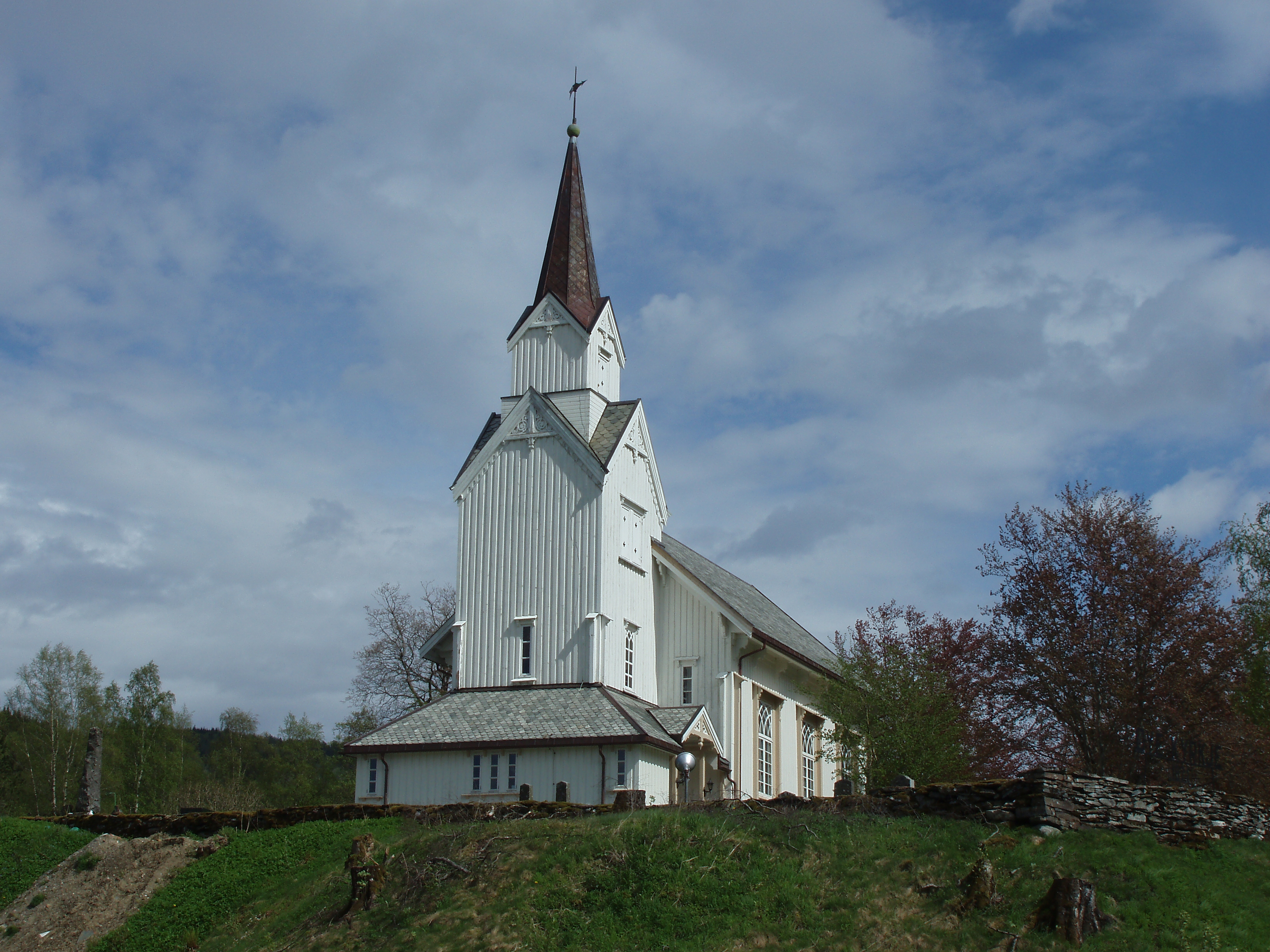
- View of the church
- Øye Church
- 62°58′50″N 8°43′07″E
- Location: Surnadal Municipality, Møre og Romsdal
- Country: Norway
- Denomination: Church of Norway
- Churchmanship: Evangelical Lutheran

History
- Status: Parish church
- Founded: 14th century
- Consecrated: 30 June 1871

Architecture
- Functional status: Active
- Architect: Jacob Wilhelm Nordan
- Architectural type: Long church
- Completed: 1871 (155 years ago)

Specifications
- Capacity: 300
- Materials: Wood

Administration
- Diocese: Møre bispedømme
- Deanery: Indre Nordmøre prosti
- Parish: Øye og Ranes
- Norwegian Cultural Heritage Site
- Type: Church
- Status: Not protected
- ID: 85936

Øye Church (Norwegian: Øye kyrkje) is a parish church of the Church of Norway in Surnadal Municipality in Møre og Romsdal county, Norway. It is located between the two villages of Sylte and Skei. It is one of the two churches for the Øye og Ranes parish which is part of the Indre Nordmøre prosti (deanery) in the Diocese of Møre. The white, wooden church was built in a long church design in 1871 using plans drawn up by the architect Jacob Wilhelm Nordan. The church seats about 300 people.

== History ==
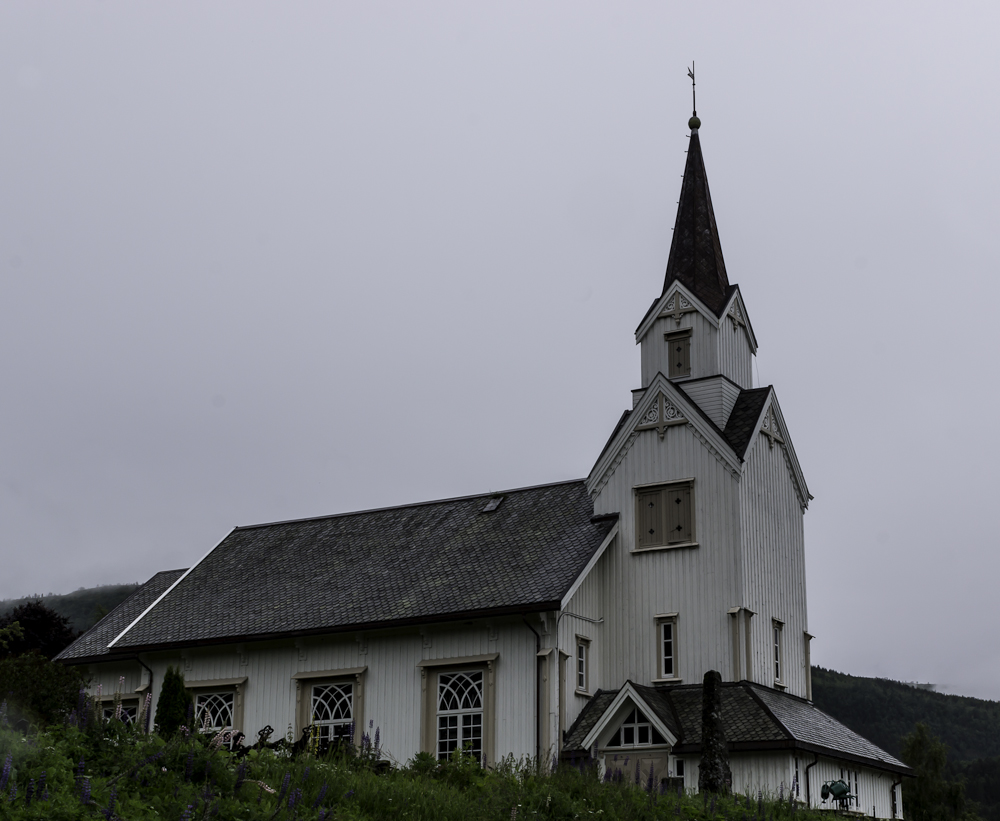
View of the church

The earliest existing historical records of the church date back to 1589, but the church was not new that year. There has been a church in the Sylte-Skei area for a long time. Not much is known about the first church, but it was a stave church that stood on the same site as the present church. It may have been built in the 14th century. In 1589, the church was transferred administratively to the parish of Stangvik. Probably during the 1600s, the church was enlarged by adding transepts to give the church a cruciform design. In 1699, a new Surnadal parish was created and Øye Church was included in that new parish. In 1724, the old medieval church was torn down and a new church was built on the same site. The new church was a timber-framed, elongated octagonal design with a tower on the roof of the nave. It also had a sacristy extension on the east end. In 1855, the private owners of the church sold the building to the local congregation. A long deliberation began among the villagers to decide what to do with the church–should they remodel it, enlarge it, or tear it down and build a new church. In 1870, the old church was torn down and work on a new church building was completed on the same site the following year in 1871. The new church was designed by standardized plans by Jacob Wilhelm Nordan with some changes by Hans Larsson Øye and Ole Scheistrøen. The new church was consecrated on 30 June 1871. In 1934, the church building was wired for electricity.

== See also ==
- List of churches in Møre
