= Glærem =

Village in Surnadal Municipality, Norway

- Village
- Interactive map of Glærem
- Location within Møre og Romsdal Location within Norway
- Coordinates: 62.9901°N 8.6366°E
- Country: Norway
- Region: Western Norway
- County: Møre og Romsdal
- District: Nordmøre
- Municipality: Surnadal Municipality

Area
  - Total: 0.63 km^{2} (0.24 sq mi)
- Elevation: 5 m (16 ft)

Population (2021)
  - Total: 252
  - Density: 400/km^{2} (1,000/sq mi)
- Time zone: UTC+01:00 (CET)
  - Summer (DST): UTC+02:00 (CEST)
- Post Code: 6650 Surnadal

Glærem is a village in Surnadal Municipality in Møre og Romsdal county, Norway. The village is located along the north shore of the Surnadalsfjorden, about 3 kilometres (1.9 mi) northwest of the village of Sylte and about 5 kilometres (3.1 mi) northwest of the villages of Skei and Surnadalsøra.

The 0.63-square-kilometre (160-acre) village had a population (2021) of 252 and a population density of 400 inhabitants per square kilometre (1,000/sq mi). Since 2021, the population and area data for this village area has not been separately tracked by Statistics Norway.
