= Åsskard Church =

Church in Møre og Romsdal, Norway

- Åsskard kyrkje
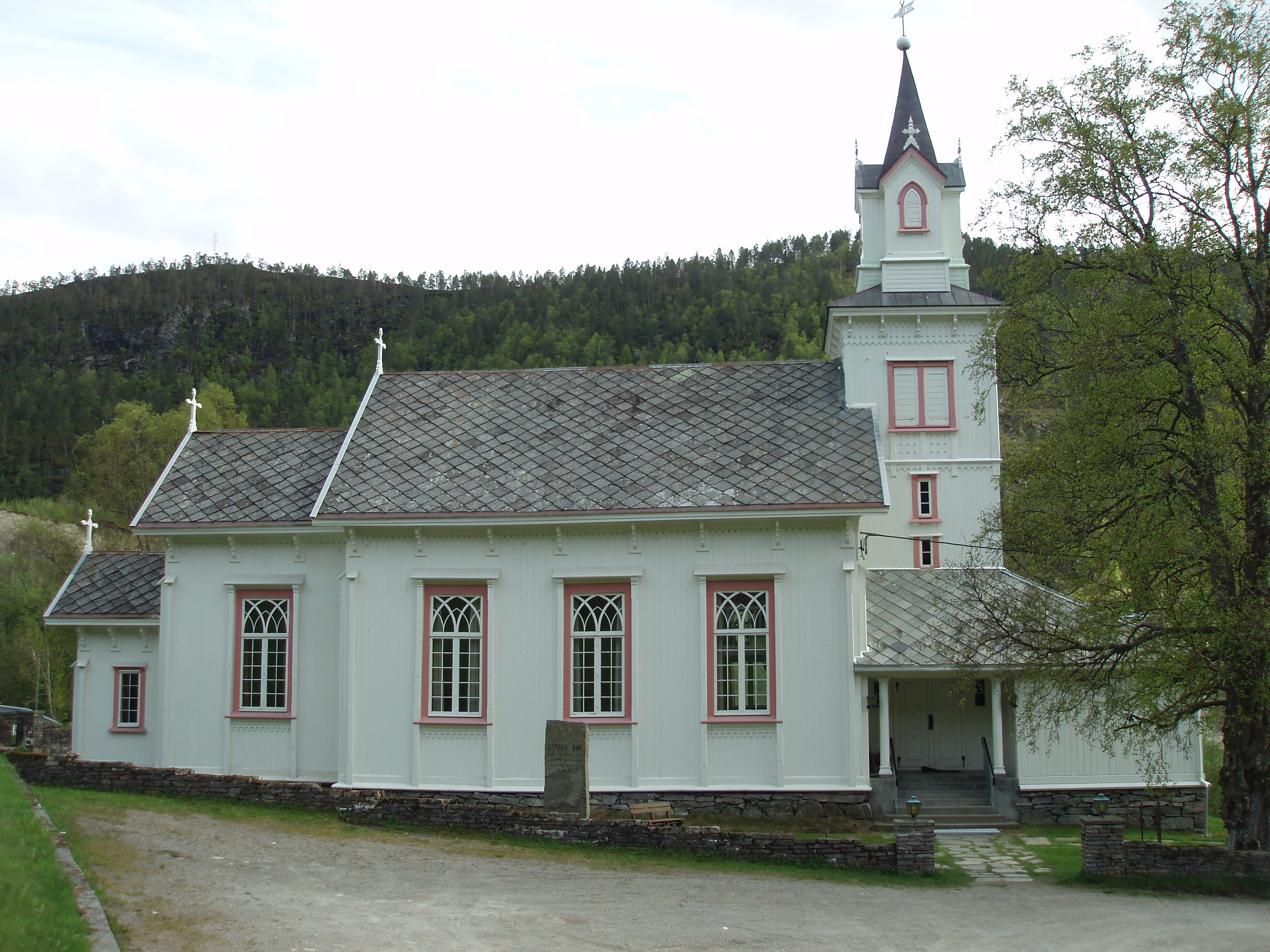
- View of the church
- Åsskard Church
- 63°01′05″N 8°29′48″E
- Location: Surnadal Municipality, Møre og Romsdal
- Country: Norway
- Denomination: Church of Norway
- Churchmanship: Evangelical Lutheran

History
- Status: Parish church
- Founded: 1876
- Consecrated: 9 Nov 1876

Architecture
- Functional status: Active
- Architect: Jacob Wilhelm Nordan
- Architectural type: Long church
- Completed: 1876 (150 years ago)

Specifications
- Capacity: 250
- Materials: Wood

Administration
- Diocese: Møre bispedømme
- Deanery: Indre Nordmøre prosti
- Parish: Åsskard
- Norwegian Cultural Heritage Site
- Type: Church
- Status: Listed
- ID: 86002

Åsskard Church (Norwegian: Åsskard kyrkje) is a parish church of the Church of Norway in Surnadal Municipality in Møre og Romsdal county, Norway. It is located in the village of Åsskard. It is the church for the Åsskard parish which is part of the Indre Nordmøre prosti (deanery) in the Diocese of Møre. The white, wooden church was built in a long church design in 1876 using plans drawn up by the architect Jacob Wilhelm Nordan. The church seats about 250 people. It was the main church for the old Åsskard Municipality which existed from 1895 until 1965.

== History ==
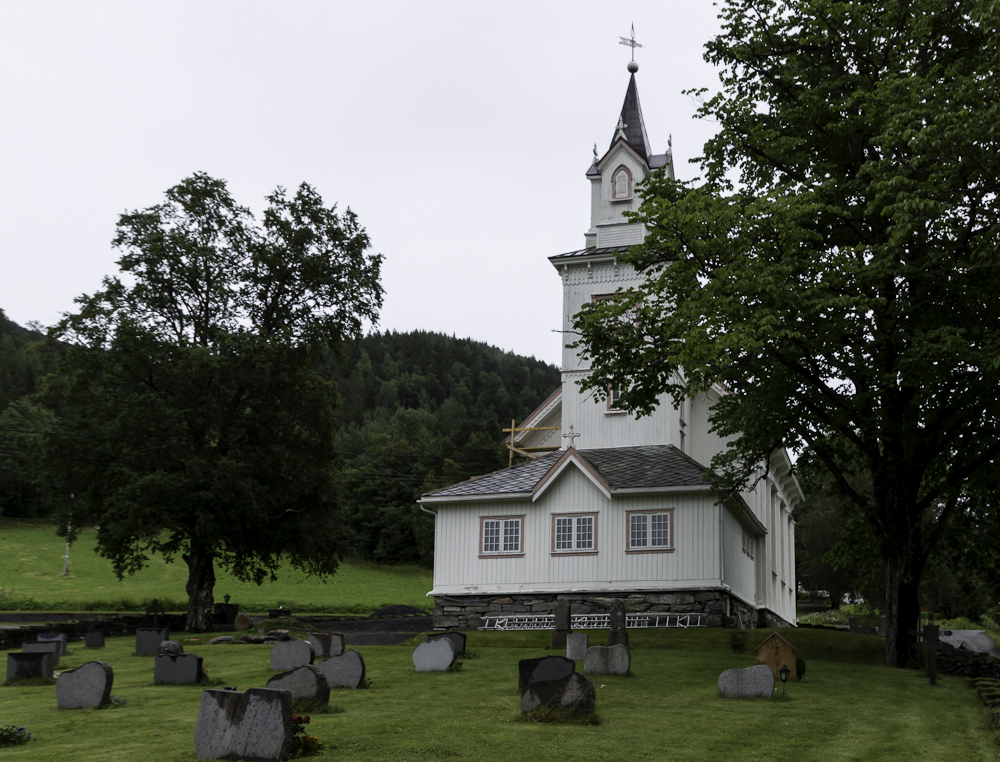
View of the church

A royal decree from 19 August 1874 granted permission to build the church in Åsskard. Christian Hovde was hired as the main builder and Jacob Wilhelm Nordan was the architect. Another royal decree from 7 August 1876 created the new parish of Åsskard. The new building was consecrated by Bishop Andreas Grimelund on 9 November 1876. Åsskard church is built as a wooden long church with a west tower, rectangular nave, and a rectangular choir with a sacristy extension on the east end. The neo-Gothic altarpiece is said to have been made in 1876 by the brothers Lars and Gudmund Brekken according to drawings by Christian Hovde. In 1960, the church was enlarged by adding some small rooms around the base of the tower.

== See also ==
- List of churches in Møre
