= Todalsøra =

Village in Surnadal Municipality, Norway

Todalsøra Todalen
- Village
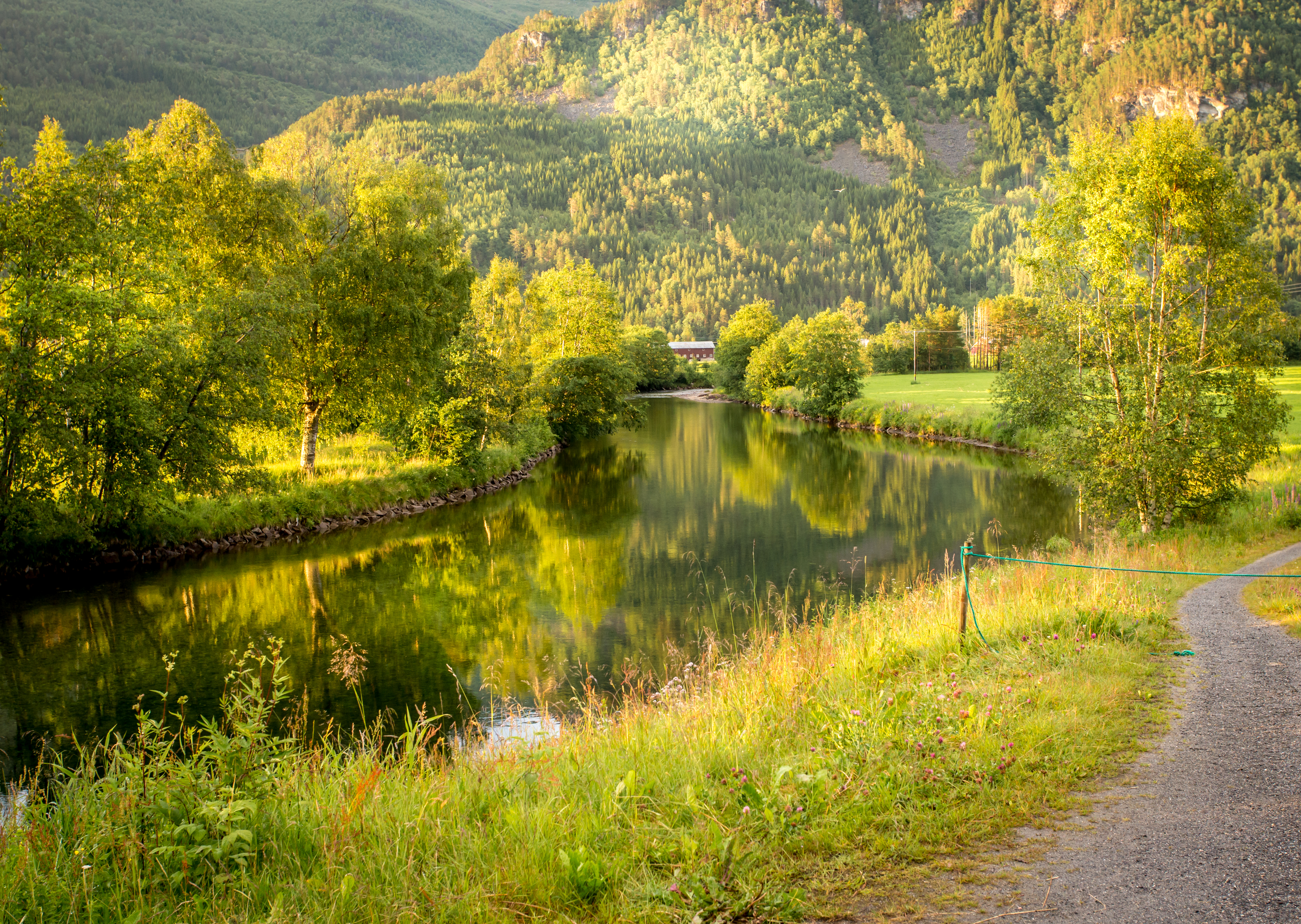
- View of the local landscape
- Interactive map of Todalsøra
- Location within Møre og Romsdal Location within Norway
- Coordinates: 62.9390°N 8.6979°E
- Country: Norway
- Region: Western Norway
- County: Møre og Romsdal
- District: Nordmøre
- Municipality: Surnadal Municipality
- Elevation: 115 m (377 ft)
- Time zone: UTC+01:00 (CET)
  - Summer (DST): UTC+02:00 (CEST)
- Post Code: 6645 Todalen

Todalsøra or Todalen is a village in Surnadal Municipality in Møre og Romsdal county, Norway. The rather isolated village is located in the Todalen valley, at the end of the Todalsfjorden (the innermost part of the Stangvikfjorden). It is located about 22 kilometres (14 mi) south of the villages of Surnadalsøra and Skei (the municipal centre of Surnadal). The village of Ålvund in Sunndal Municipality lies 9 kilometres (5.6 mi) to the west, although there is no direct connections by road between the two villages due to large mountains. Todalen Church is located in this village.

It is located where the river Toåa empties into the Todalsfjorden. Norwegian County Road 6145 ends in the village, the only road connecting the village to the rest of Norway. The mountain Vassnebba lies just to the west and the mountains Indre Sula and Ytre Sula lie just to the north.

== Notable people ==
- Leif Halse, a teacher, novelist, short story writer, children's writer, comics writer, and local historian
