= Åsskard =

Village in Surnadal Municipality, Norway

- Village
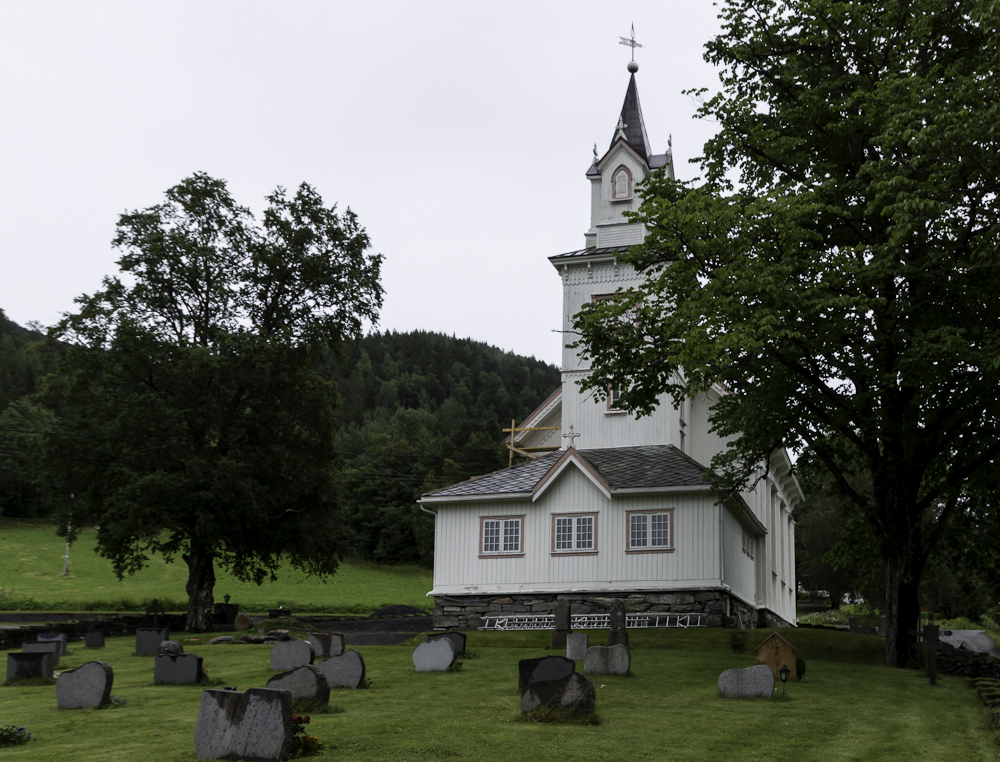
- View of the local church
- Interactive map of Åsskard
- Location within Møre og Romsdal Location within Norway
- Coordinates: 63.0185°N 8.4949°E
- Country: Norway
- Region: Western Norway
- County: Møre og Romsdal
- District: Nordmøre
- Municipality: Surnadal Municipality
- Elevation: 1 m (3.3 ft)
- Time zone: UTC+01:00 (CET)
  - Summer (DST): UTC+02:00 (CEST)
- Post Code: 6644 Bæverfjord

Åsskard is a village in Surnadal Municipality in Møre og Romsdal county, Norway. The village is located in the western part of the municipality, at the innermost part of the Åsskardfjorden which is a branch off the main Trongfjorden. The village is the site of Åsskard Church.

It is located about 12 kilometres (7.5 mi) northwest of the village of Sylte. The only road connecting Heim Municipality and Surnadal Municipality, County Road 65, runs through the village.

Historically, the village was the administrative centre of the old Åsskard Municipality from 1895 until the dissolution of the municipality in 1965.
