= Todalen Church =

Church in Møre og Romsdal, Norway

- Todalen kyrkje
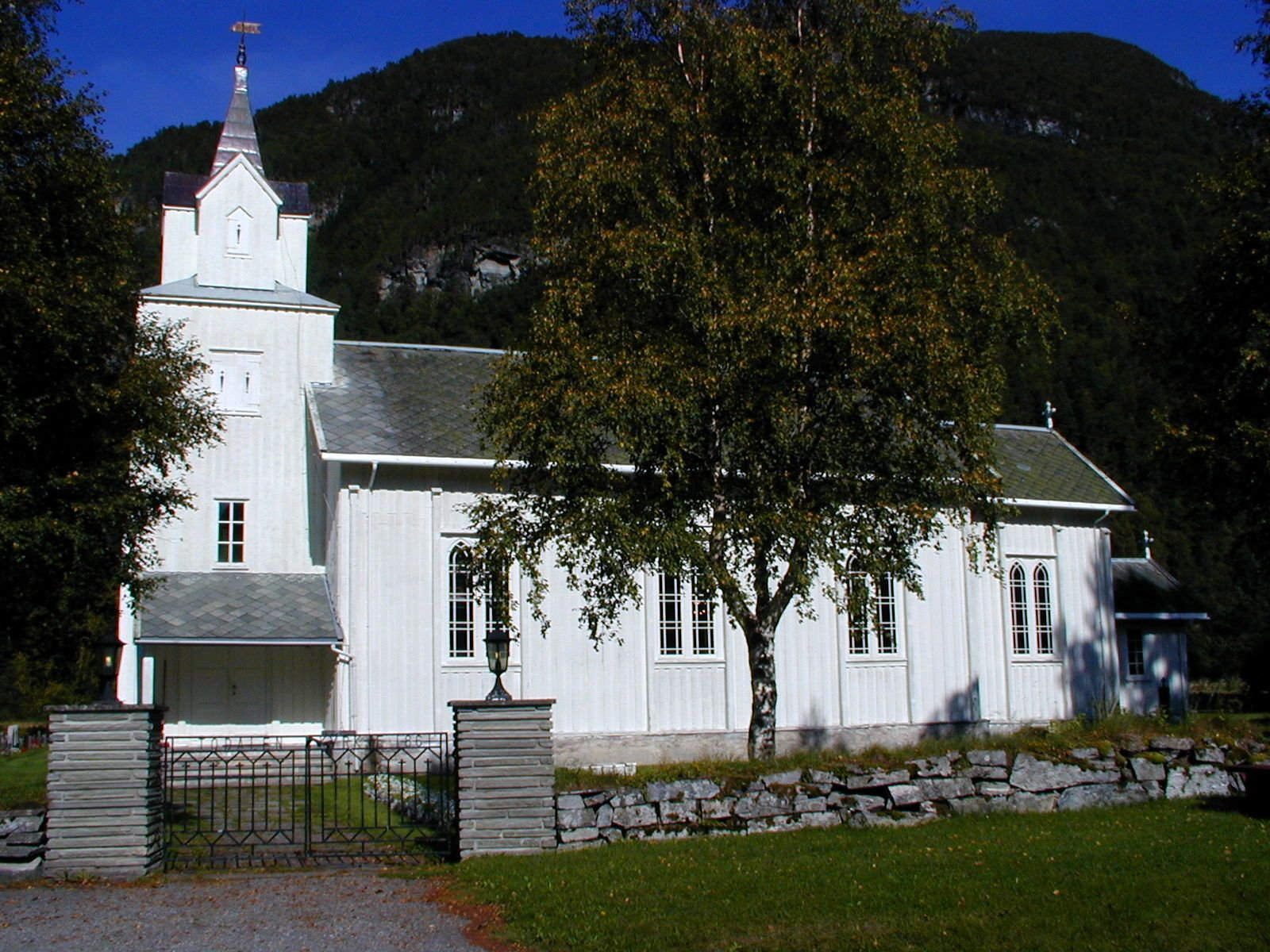
- View of the church
- Todalen Church
- 62°48′50″N 8°42′59″E
- Location: Surnadal Municipality, Møre og Romsdal
- Country: Norway
- Denomination: Church of Norway
- Churchmanship: Evangelical Lutheran

History
- Status: Parish church
- Founded: 1861
- Consecrated: 11 Sept 1861

Architecture
- Functional status: Active
- Architect: Jacob Wilhelm Nordan
- Architectural type: Long church
- Completed: 1861 (165 years ago)

Specifications
- Capacity: 250
- Materials: Wood

Administration
- Diocese: Møre bispedømme
- Deanery: Indre Nordmøre prosti
- Parish: Todalen
- Norwegian Cultural Heritage Site
- Type: Church
- Status: Not protected
- ID: 85640

Todalen Church (Norwegian: Todalen kyrkje) is a parish church of the Church of Norway in Surnadal Municipality in Møre og Romsdal county, Norway. It is located in the village of Todalsøra. It is the church for the Todalen parish which is part of the Indre Nordmøre prosti (deanery) in the Diocese of Møre. The white, wooden church was built in a long church design in 1861 using plans drawn up by the architect Jacob Wilhelm Nordan. The church seats about 250 people.

== History ==
Historically, the people of the Todalen valley were part of the Stangvik Church parish. In the mid-19th century, the people of the valley petitioned for their own chapel. A royal resolution on 4 January 1860 granted permission for the parish to build an annex chapel in Todalsøra. The parish used standardized architectural drawings from Jacob Wilhelm Nordan and the lead builder was Ola Isakson Hyllnesbukten who brought several other men with him to build the chapel. The chapel was consecrated on 11 September 1861. The chapel was a simple rectangular nave with a small tower on the roof ridge. In 1876, the chapel was upgraded to the status of parish church. In the late-1880s, the church was renovated and expanded. A new tower on the west end was built along with a chancel and sacristy on the east end. After the completion of the work, the church was re-consecrated on 6 December 1890.

== See also ==
- List of churches in Møre
