= Åsskardfjorden =

Fjord in Møre og Romsdal, Norway

- Interactive map of the fjord
- Location: Møre og Romsdal county, Norway
- Coordinates: 63.01099°N 8.44129°E
- Type: Fjord
- Primary outflows: Bøfjorden, Trongfjorden
- Basin countries: Norway
- Max. length: 6 kilometres (3.7 mi)
- Settlements: Åsskard

Åsskardfjorden is a fjord in Surnadal Municipality in Møre og Romsdal county, Norway. The 6-kilometre (3.7 mi) long fjord is an arm off the main Trongfjorden. The village of Åsskard lies at the innermost part of the fjord. The villages of Bølandet and Settemsøran lie near the mouth of the fjord and they are connected by a bridge crossing the fjord. The outer part of the Åsskardfjorden is known as the Bøfjorden. The fjord was historically located in the central part of the old Åsskard Municipality.

== See also ==
- List of Norwegian fjords
