= Hans Hyldbakk =

Norwegian poet and historian

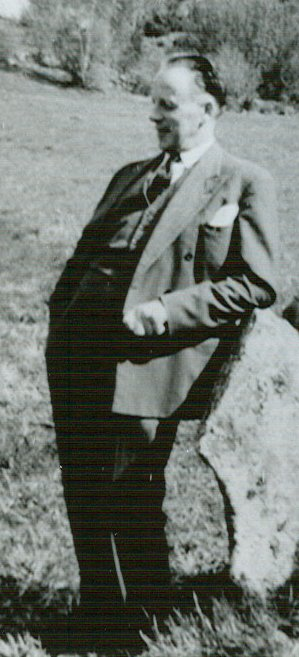
Hans Hyldbakk.

Hans Hyldbakk (8 May 1898 – 18 August 2001) was a Norwegian poet and historian.

He was born and died in Surnadal Municipality. As a writer he is best known for the song Vårsøg. His poetry debut came in 1929 with Harpespel, and his last issue was 1998's Lauvfall.
