= Stangvik =

Village in Surnadal Municipality, Norway

- Village
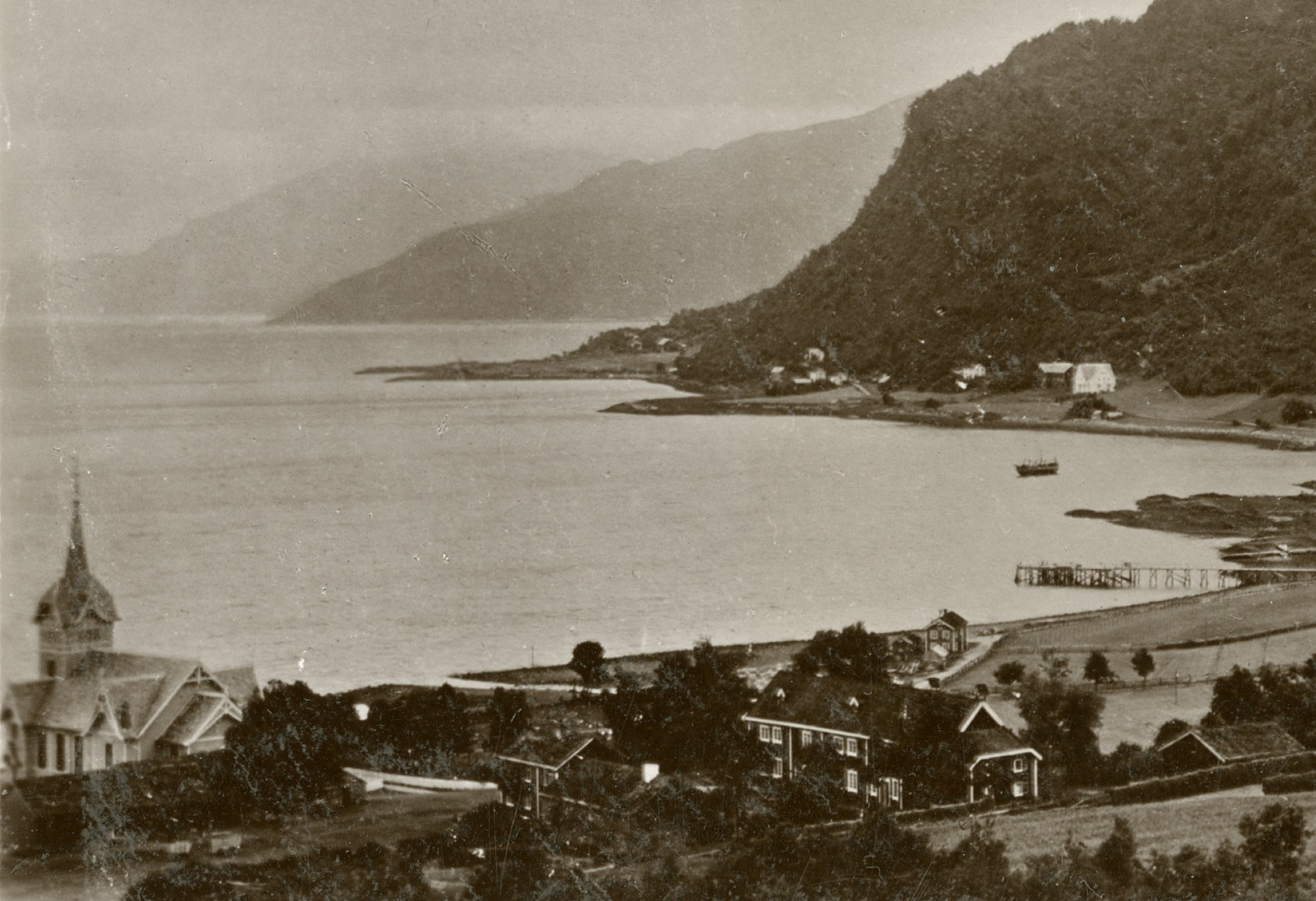
- View of the village (early 1900s)
- Interactive map of Stangvik
- Location within Møre og Romsdal Location within Norway
- Coordinates: 62.9169°N 8.4718°E
- Country: Norway
- Region: Western Norway
- County: Møre og Romsdal
- District: Nordmøre
- Municipality: Surnadal Municipality
- Elevation: 49 m (161 ft)
- Time zone: UTC+01:00 (CET)
  - Summer (DST): UTC+02:00 (CEST)
- Post Code: 6642 Stangvik

Stangvik is a village in Surnadal Municipality in Møre og Romsdal county, Norway. The village is located along the Stangvikfjorden, about 20 kilometres (12 mi) southwest of the villages of Surnadalsøra and Skei. The village lies in a small valley along the fjord, with the 890-metre (2,920 ft) tall mountain Strengen lying just east of the village.

The village is home to Stangvik Church. County Road 6144 runs through the village, along the coast of the fjord.

== History ==
The village was the administrative centre of the old Stangvik Municipality from 1838 until its dissolution in 1965.
