= Surnadal Municipality =

Municipality in Møre og Romsdal, Norway

Surnadal Municipality Surnadal kommune
- Municipality
- Surendalen herred (historic name)
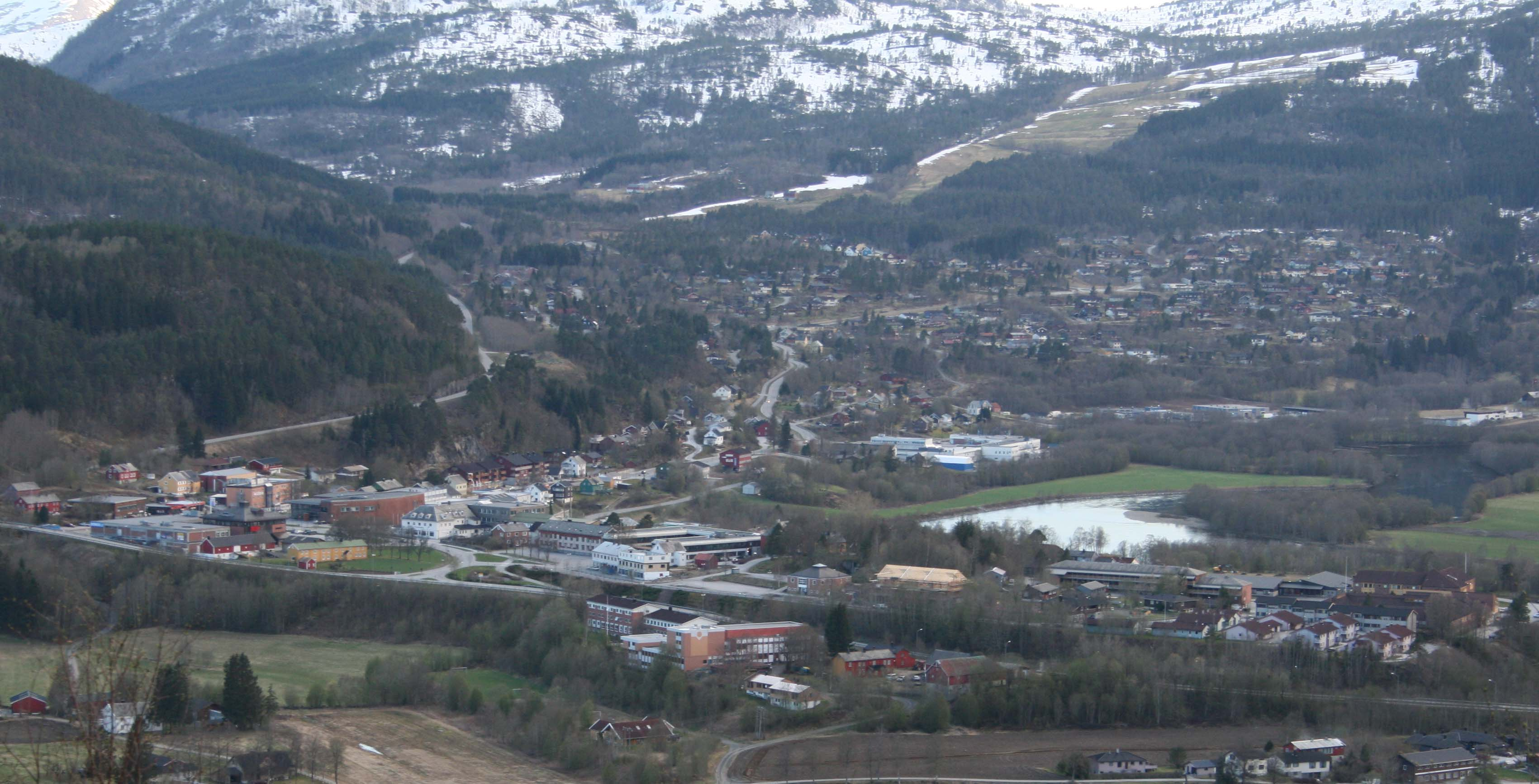
- View of Skei in Surnadal

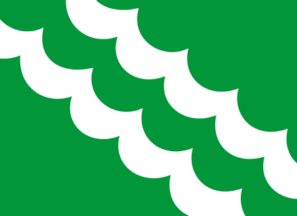
- Flag Coat of arms

- Møre og Romsdal within Norway

- Surnadal within Møre og Romsdal
- Coordinates: 62°56′51″N 08°46′12″E
- Country: Norway
- County: Møre og Romsdal
- District: Nordmøre
- Established: 1 Jan 1838
  - Created as: Formannskapsdistrikt
- Administrative centre: Skei

Government
  - Mayor (2023): Hugo Pedersen (Sp)

Area
  - Total: 1,366.03 km^{2} (527.43 sq mi)
  - Land: 1,315.05 km^{2} (507.74 sq mi)
  - Water: 50.98 km^{2} (19.68 sq mi) 3.7%
  - Rank: #68 in Norway
- Highest elevation: 1,668.09 m (5,472.7 ft)

Population (2024)
  - Total: 5,953
  - Rank: #164 in Norway
  - Density: 4.4/km^{2} (11/sq mi)
  - Change (10 years): ▼ −0.02%
- Demonym: Surndaling

Official language
  - Norwegian form: Nynorsk
- Time zone: UTC+01:00 (CET)
  - Summer (DST): UTC+02:00 (CEST)
- ISO 3166 code: NO-1566
- Website: Official website

Surnadal is a municipality in Møre og Romsdal county, Norway. It is part of the Nordmøre region. The administrative centre is the village of Skei. Other villages in Surnadal include Bøverfjorden, Glærem, Moen, Stangvik, Surnadalsøra, Sylte, Todalsøra, and Åsskard.

The 1,366-square-kilometre (527 sq mi) municipality is the 68th largest by area out of the 357 municipalities in Norway. Surnadal is the 164th most populous municipality in Norway, with a population of 5,953. The municipality's population density is 4.4 inhabitants per square kilometre (11/sq mi) and its population has decreased by 0.02% over the previous 10-year period.

A mild climate and rich soil make Surnadal well suited for agriculture. The local economy is based on agriculture, forestry, and industrial production, in addition to services.

== General information ==
The parish of Surnadal was established as a municipality on 1 January 1838 (see formannskapsdistrikt law). In 1858, the eastern district of the municipality (population: 2,684) was separated to form the new Rindal Municipality. This left Surnadal Municipality with 3,105 residents. On 1 January 1877, part of Stangvik Municipality (population: 50) was transferred to Surnadal Municipality. In 1879, part of Surnadal Municipality (population: 83) was transferred to the neighboring Stangvik Municipality. On 1 January 1886, the Møklegjerdet farm (population: 29), just west of the village of Glærem, was transferred from Stangvik Municipality to Surnadal Municipality. On 1 January 1897, the Sjøflot farm (population: 27) was also transferred from Stangvik Municipality to Surnadal Municipality.

During the 1960s, there were many municipal mergers across Norway due to the work of the Schei Committee. On 1 January 1965, all of Åsskard Municipality (population: 1,014) and most of Stangvik Municipality (population: 1,386) were merged with Surnadal Municipality (population: 3,534) to create a new, larger Surnadal Municipality with a total population of 5,934.

=== Name ===
The municipality (originally the parish) is named after the Surnadalen valley (Old Norse: Súrnardalr). The first element is the genitive case of the river name Surna. The meaning of the river name is unknown. The last element is dalr which means "valley" or "dale". Historically, the name of the municipality was spelled Surendalen. On 3 November 1917, a royal resolution changed the spelling of the name of the municipality to Surnadal.

=== Coat of arms ===
The coat of arms was granted on 27 October 1989. The official blazon is "Vert, two bends engrailed above and invected below argent" (Norwegian: På grøn grunn ein skråstilt sølv tvillingstreng laga med taggesnitt). This means the arms have a green field (background) and the charge is two bends that have wavy edges. The charge has a tincture of argent which means it is commonly colored white, but if it is made out of metal, then silver is used. The wavy lines represent the many rivers and streams in the municipality, the most notable one being the Surna. The arms were designed by Even Jarle Skoglund. The municipal flag has the same design as the coat of arms.

=== Churches ===
The Church of Norway has five parishes (sokn) within Surnadal Municipality. It is part of the Indre Nordmøre prosti (deanery) in the Diocese of Møre.

Churches in Surnadal Municipality
| Parish (sokn) | Church name | Location of the church | Year built |
|---|---|---|---|
| Mo | Mo Church | Moen | 1728 |
| Stangvik | Stangvik Church | Stangvik | 1896 |
| Todalen | Todalen Church | Todalsøra | 1861 |
| Øye og Ranes | Ranes Church | Ranes | 1869 |
| Øye og Ranes | Øye Church | Skei | 1871 |
| Åsskard | Åsskard Church | Åsskard | 1876 |

== Geography ==
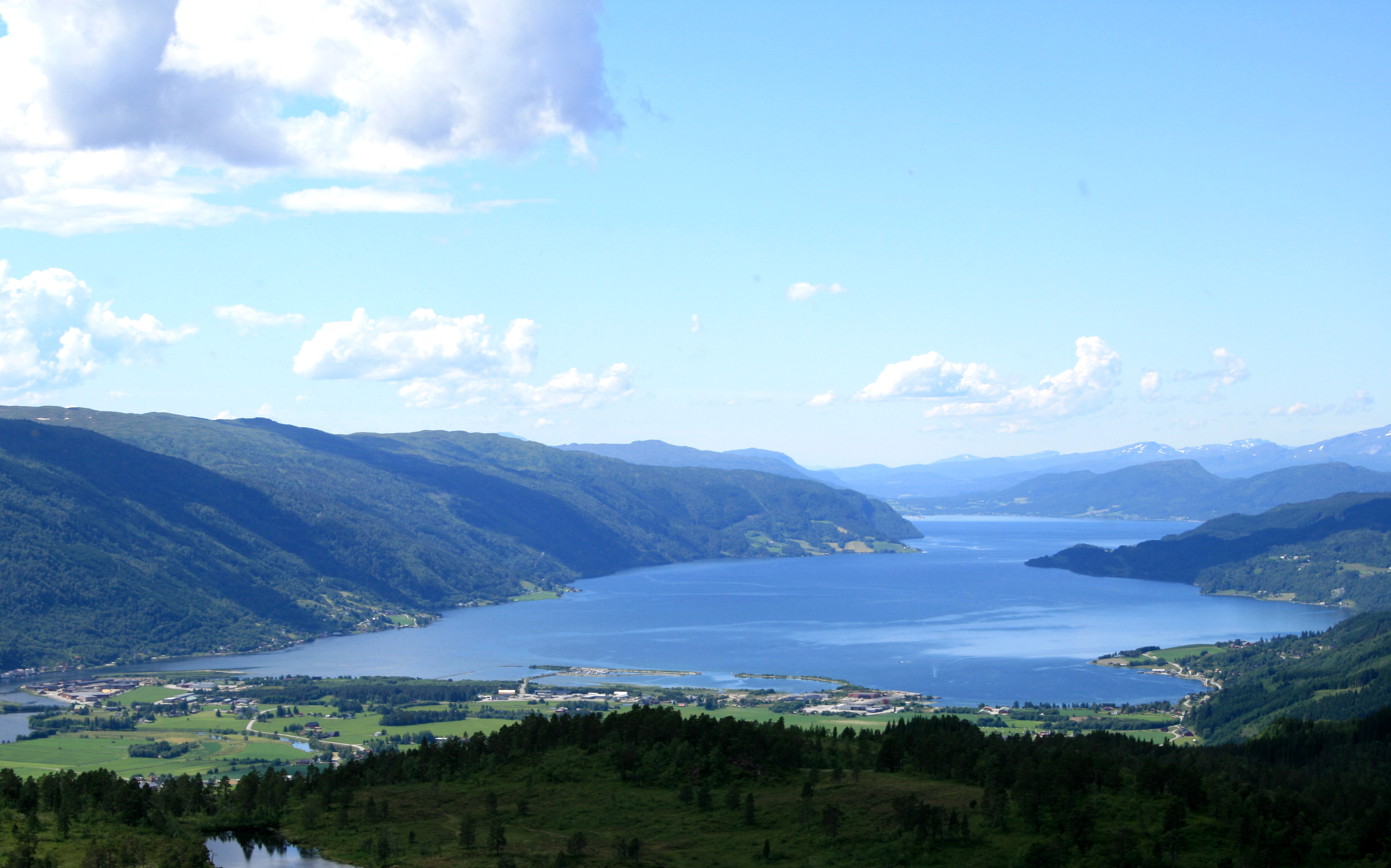
View of the Surnadalsfjorden

The municipality is made up by the main Surnadalen valley through which the river Surna runs. There are also many smaller side valleys including Stor-Bæverdalen, Settemsdalen, Øvstbødalen, Todalen, and Vinddøldalen. The municipality is bordered by the Trollheimen mountain range and Sunndal Municipality to the south, the neighboring Rindal Municipality to the east, Heim Municipality to the north, and several fjords to the west: Trongfjorden, Stangvikfjorden, and Todalsfjorden. There are three main fjords that cut into the municipality: Åsskardfjorden, Hamnesfjorden, and Surnadalsfjorden.

The landscape is a combination of forests, fjords, and mountains. The highest mountain peak is Snota at 1,668 metres (5,472 ft) above sea level. Other mountains include Vassnebba, Indre Sula and Ytre Sula, Neådalssnota, and Trollhetta. The river Surna runs through the valley from the east to the west, and forms a large delta where it enters the fjord near Surnadalsøra and Skei. This river is rich in salmon, which attract tourists from the rest of the country and abroad. The lakes Foldsjøen and Gråsjøen lie along the border with Rindal Municipality in the east. The Grønkjølen Nature Reserve lies in the extreme northeast of the municipality.

== Climate ==
Surnadal is situated at the head of a long fjord some distance from the coast and has an oceanic climate or humid continental climate, depending on winter threshold used (−3 °C (27 °F)) gives oceanic, 0 °C (32 °F) gives humid continental). The wettest season is August–December, while Feb - May is the driest. The record high 33.6 °C (92.5 °F) recorded 27 July 2018. The warmest night was 29 July 2018 with low 24.5 °C (76.1 °F). On 14 October 2018 a high of 25.5 °C (77.9 °F) was recorded in Surnadal, the second warmest October temperature in Norway. Winter temperatures can get below −20 °C (−4 °F), although that is rare. February 2010 a low of −23.4 °C (−10.1 °F) was recorded.

Climate data for Surnadal - Sylte 1991-2020 (5 m)
| Month | Jan | Feb | Mar | Apr | May | Jun | Jul | Aug | Sep | Oct | Nov | Dec | Year |
|---|---|---|---|---|---|---|---|---|---|---|---|---|---|
| Daily mean °C (°F) | −2.4 (27.7) | −2.3 (27.9) | 0.2 (32.4) | 4.6 (40.3) | 9 (48) | 12.7 (54.9) | 15 (59) | 14.2 (57.6) | 10.4 (50.7) | 4.3 (39.7) | 0.5 (32.9) | −1.7 (28.9) | 5.4 (41.7) |
| Average precipitation mm (inches) | 103 (4.1) | 73 (2.9) | 96 (3.8) | 69 (2.7) | 80 (3.1) | 100 (3.9) | 99 (3.9) | 121 (4.8) | 142 (5.6) | 132 (5.2) | 104 (4.1) | 129 (5.1) | 1,248 (49.2) |
Source: yr.no

== Government ==
Surnadal Municipality is responsible for primary education (through 10th grade), outpatient health services, senior citizen services, welfare and other social services, zoning, economic development, and municipal roads and utilities. The municipality is governed by a municipal council of directly elected representatives. The mayor is indirectly elected by a vote of the municipal council. The municipality is under the jurisdiction of the Nordmøre og Romsdal District Court and the Frostating Court of Appeal. Waste management was from 2011 handled by the inter-municipal agency HAMOS Forvaltning. It merged into ReMidt in 2020.

=== Municipal council ===
The municipal council (Kommunestyre) of Surnadal Municipality is made up of 27 representatives that are elected to four year terms. The tables below show the current and historical composition of the council by political party.

Surnadal kommunestyre 2023–2027
| Party name (in Nynorsk) | Number of representatives |
|---|---|
| Labour Party (Arbeidarpartiet) | 7 |
| Progress Party (Framstegspartiet) | 2 |
| Green Party (Miljøpartiet Dei Grøne) | 2 |
| Conservative Party (Høgre) | 7 |
| Red Party (Raudt) | 1 |
| Centre Party (Senterpartiet) | 8 |
| Total number of members: | 27 |

Surnadal kommunestyre 2019–2023
| Party name (in Nynorsk) | Number of representatives |
|---|---|
| Labour Party (Arbeidarpartiet) | 8 |
| Progress Party (Framstegspartiet) | 2 |
| Green Party (Miljøpartiet Dei Grøne) | 1 |
| Conservative Party (Høgre) | 2 |
| Centre Party (Senterpartiet) | 13 |
| Socialist Left Party (Sosialistisk Venstreparti) | 1 |
| Total number of members: | 27 |

Surnadal kommunestyre 2015–2019
| Party name (in Nynorsk) | Number of representatives |
|---|---|
| Labour Party (Arbeidarpartiet) | 12 |
| Progress Party (Framstegspartiet) | 1 |
| Green Party (Miljøpartiet Dei Grøne) | 1 |
| Conservative Party (Høgre) | 3 |
| Christian Democratic Party (Kristeleg Folkeparti) | 1 |
| Centre Party (Senterpartiet) | 9 |
| Total number of members: | 27 |

Surnadal kommunestyre 2011–2015
| Party name (in Nynorsk) | Number of representatives |
|---|---|
| Labour Party (Arbeidarpartiet) | 13 |
| Progress Party (Framstegspartiet) | 2 |
| Conservative Party (Høgre) | 2 |
| Christian Democratic Party (Kristeleg Folkeparti) | 1 |
| Centre Party (Senterpartiet) | 8 |
| Socialist Left Party (Sosialistisk Venstreparti) | 1 |
| Total number of members: | 27 |

Surnadal kommunestyre 2007–2011
| Party name (in Nynorsk) | Number of representatives |
|---|---|
| Labour Party (Arbeidarpartiet) | 10 |
| Progress Party (Framstegspartiet) | 2 |
| Conservative Party (Høgre) | 3 |
| Christian Democratic Party (Kristeleg Folkeparti) | 2 |
| Centre Party (Senterpartiet) | 9 |
| Socialist Left Party (Sosialistisk Venstreparti) | 1 |
| Total number of members: | 27 |

Surnadal kommunestyre 2003–2007
| Party name (in Nynorsk) | Number of representatives |
|---|---|
| Labour Party (Arbeidarpartiet) | 8 |
| Conservative Party (Høgre) | 2 |
| Christian Democratic Party (Kristeleg Folkeparti) | 2 |
| Centre Party (Senterpartiet) | 13 |
| Socialist Left Party (Sosialistisk Venstreparti) | 2 |
| Total number of members: | 27 |

Surnadal kommunestyre 1999–2003
| Party name (in Nynorsk) | Number of representatives |
|---|---|
| Labour Party (Arbeidarpartiet) | 12 |
| Conservative Party (Høgre) | 2 |
| Christian Democratic Party (Kristeleg Folkeparti) | 2 |
| Centre Party (Senterpartiet) | 16 |
| Socialist Left Party (Sosialistisk Venstreparti) | 1 |
| Total number of members: | 33 |

Surnadal kommunestyre 1995–1999
| Party name (in Nynorsk) | Number of representatives |
|---|---|
| Labour Party (Arbeidarpartiet) | 14 |
| Conservative Party (Høgre) | 3 |
| Christian Democratic Party (Kristeleg Folkeparti) | 2 |
| Centre Party (Senterpartiet) | 12 |
| Socialist Left Party (Sosialistisk Venstreparti) | 1 |
| Liberal Party (Venstre) | 1 |
| Total number of members: | 33 |

Surnadal kommunestyre 1991–1995
| Party name (in Nynorsk) | Number of representatives |
|---|---|
| Labour Party (Arbeidarpartiet) | 13 |
| Progress Party (Framstegspartiet) | 1 |
| Conservative Party (Høgre) | 2 |
| Christian Democratic Party (Kristeleg Folkeparti) | 3 |
| Centre Party (Senterpartiet) | 11 |
| Socialist Left Party (Sosialistisk Venstreparti) | 2 |
| Liberal Party (Venstre) | 1 |
| Total number of members: | 33 |

Surnadal kommunestyre 1987–1991
| Party name (in Nynorsk) | Number of representatives |
|---|---|
| Labour Party (Arbeidarpartiet) | 16 |
| Conservative Party (Høgre) | 3 |
| Christian Democratic Party (Kristeleg Folkeparti) | 3 |
| Centre Party (Senterpartiet) | 9 |
| Liberal Party (Venstre) | 2 |
| Total number of members: | 33 |

Surnadal kommunestyre 1983–1987
| Party name (in Nynorsk) | Number of representatives |
|---|---|
| Labour Party (Arbeidarpartiet) | 16 |
| Conservative Party (Høgre) | 3 |
| Christian Democratic Party (Kristeleg Folkeparti) | 2 |
| Centre Party (Senterpartiet) | 10 |
| Liberal Party (Venstre) | 2 |
| Total number of members: | 33 |

Surnadal kommunestyre 1979–1983
| Party name (in Nynorsk) | Number of representatives |
|---|---|
| Labour Party (Arbeidarpartiet) | 15 |
| Conservative Party (Høgre) | 3 |
| Christian Democratic Party (Kristeleg Folkeparti) | 3 |
| Centre Party (Senterpartiet) | 10 |
| Liberal Party (Venstre) | 2 |
| Total number of members: | 33 |

Surnadal kommunestyre 1975–1979
| Party name (in Nynorsk) | Number of representatives |
|---|---|
| Labour Party (Arbeidarpartiet) | 14 |
| Conservative Party (Høgre) | 2 |
| Christian Democratic Party (Kristeleg Folkeparti) | 4 |
| Centre Party (Senterpartiet) | 12 |
| Liberal Party (Venstre) | 1 |
| Total number of members: | 33 |

Surnadal kommunestyre 1971–1975
| Party name (in Nynorsk) | Number of representatives |
|---|---|
| Labour Party (Arbeidarpartiet) | 17 |
| Christian Democratic Party (Kristeleg Folkeparti) | 3 |
| Centre Party (Senterpartiet) | 11 |
| Joint List(s) of Non-Socialist Parties (Borgarlege Felleslister) | 2 |
| Total number of members: | 33 |

Surnadal kommunestyre 1967–1971
| Party name (in Nynorsk) | Number of representatives |
|---|---|
| Labour Party (Arbeidarpartiet) | 17 |
| Conservative Party (Høgre) | 2 |
| Christian Democratic Party (Kristeleg Folkeparti) | 3 |
| Centre Party (Senterpartiet) | 10 |
| Liberal Party (Venstre) | 1 |
| Total number of members: | 33 |

Surnadal kommunestyre 1963–1967
| Party name (in Nynorsk) | Number of representatives |
|---|---|
| Labour Party (Arbeidarpartiet) | 11 |
| Conservative Party (Høgre) | 2 |
| Christian Democratic Party (Kristeleg Folkeparti) | 2 |
| Centre Party (Senterpartiet) | 5 |
| Liberal Party (Venstre) | 1 |
| Total number of members: | 21 |
Note: On 1 January 1965, Åsskard Municipality and most of Stangvik Municipality became part of Surnadal Municipality.

Surnadal heradsstyre 1959–1963
| Party name (in Nynorsk) | Number of representatives |
|---|---|
| Labour Party (Arbeidarpartiet) | 12 |
| Conservative Party (Høgre) | 1 |
| Christian Democratic Party (Kristeleg Folkeparti) | 2 |
| Centre Party (Senterpartiet) | 5 |
| Liberal Party (Venstre) | 1 |
| Total number of members: | 21 |

Surnadal heradsstyre 1955–1959
| Party name (in Nynorsk) | Number of representatives |
|---|---|
| Labour Party (Arbeidarpartiet) | 11 |
| Conservative Party (Høgre) | 1 |
| Christian Democratic Party (Kristeleg Folkeparti) | 3 |
| Farmers' Party (Bondepartiet) | 5 |
| Liberal Party (Venstre) | 1 |
| Total number of members: | 21 |

Surnadal heradsstyre 1951–1955
| Party name (in Nynorsk) | Number of representatives |
|---|---|
| Labour Party (Arbeidarpartiet) | 11 |
| Christian Democratic Party (Kristeleg Folkeparti) | 2 |
| Joint List(s) of Non-Socialist Parties (Borgarlege Felleslister) | 7 |
| Total number of members: | 20 |

Surnadal heradsstyre 1947–1951
| Party name (in Nynorsk) | Number of representatives |
|---|---|
| Labour Party (Arbeidarpartiet) | 8 |
| Christian Democratic Party (Kristeleg Folkeparti) | 3 |
| Joint List(s) of Non-Socialist Parties (Borgarlege Felleslister) | 5 |
| Total number of members: | 16 |

Surnadal heradsstyre 1945–1947
| Party name (in Nynorsk) | Number of representatives |
|---|---|
| Labour Party (Arbeidarpartiet) | 10 |
| Joint List(s) of Non-Socialist Parties (Borgarlege Felleslister) | 6 |
| Total number of members: | 16 |

Surnadal heradsstyre 1937–1941*
| Party name (in Nynorsk) | Number of representatives |
|---|---|
| Labour Party (Arbeidarpartiet) | 8 |
| Farmers' Party (Bondepartiet) | 3 |
| Liberal Party (Venstre) | 1 |
| Joint list of the Farmers' Party (Bondepartiet) and the Liberal Party (Venstre) | 1 |
| Local List(s) (Lokale lister) | 3 |
| Total number of members: | 16 |
Note: Due to the German occupation of Norway during World War II, no elections were held for new municipal councils until after the war ended in 1945.

=== Mayors ===
The mayor (Nynorsk: ordførar) of Surnadal Municipality is the political leader of the municipality and the chairperson of the municipal council. Here is a list of people who have held this position:

- 1838–1851: Domenicus Brun
- 1851–1853: Lars Ranes
- 1853–1855: Lars O. Løseth
- 1855–1858: Guido Brandt
- 1858–1859: Lars Fiske
- 1860–1866: Fredrik Sæter
- 1866–1870: Lars J. Kringstad
- 1871–1881: Ole Øye
- 1882–1888: Lars Kvendbø
- 1889–1891: J. Krangnæs
- 1892–1893: Lars Kvendbø
- 1897–1898: Gregorius Olsen Fiske
- 1899–1904: Lars Pedersen Mogstad
- 1904–1916: Sivert Sivertsen Glærum (V)
- 1916–1919: S. Svendsen
- 1919–1937: Ola Dønheim (V)
- 1938–1941: Hans Svean (V)
- 1945–1945: Ola Dønheim (V)
- 1945–1955: Anders Sæterøy (Ap)
- 1965–1967: Olav T. Halle (Sp)
- 1968–1971: Petter Garte (Ap)
- 1972–1975: Erik Brøske (Ap)
- 1976–1983: Nils Magnar Torvik (Sp)
- 1984–1986: Helge Røv (Ap)
- 1987–1991: Helge Vold (Ap)
- 1992–1995: Ola O. Fiske (Sp)
- 1995–1996: Asbjørn Ørsal (Ap)
- 1997–2007: Bergsvein Brøske (Sp)
- 2007–2014: Mons Otnes (Ap)
- 2014–2019: Lilly Gunn Nyheim (Ap)
- 2019–2023: Margrethe Svinvik (Sp)
- 2023–present: Hugo Pedersen (Sp)

== Transportation ==
Transportation services include ferries to the southwest and the northwest, which lead to the coastal areas of Møre og Romsdal, and a highway to the city of Trondheim to the east.

== Notable people ==
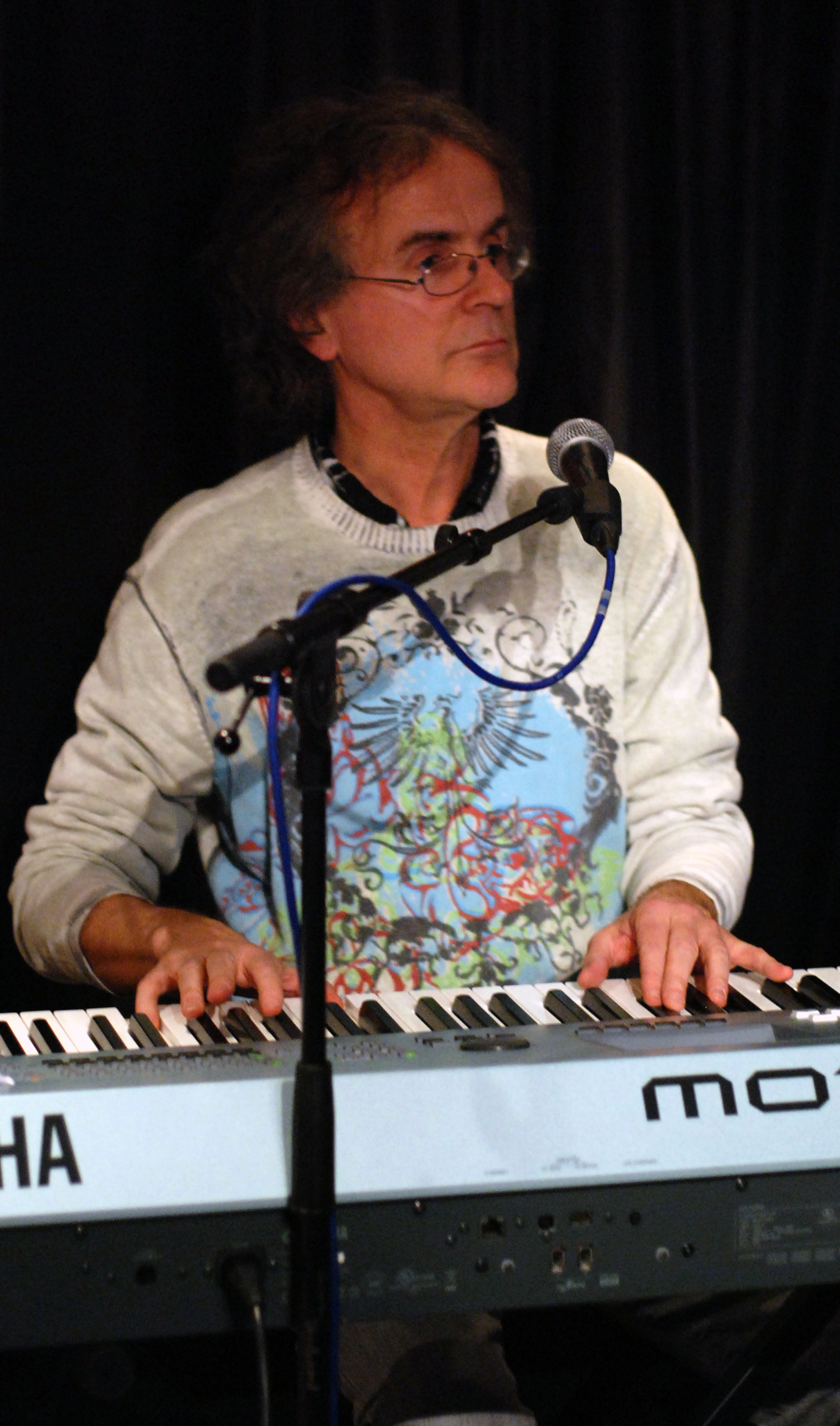
Henning Sommerro, 2010

- Ole Andreas Lindeman (1769–1857), a musician, organist, composer, and music educator
- Hans Holten (1892–1973), a newspaper editor
- Hans Hyldbakk (1898–2001), a folklore poet
- Anders Sæterøy (1901–1991), a politician and Mayor of Surnadal three times after WWII
- Kaare Espolin Johnson (1907–1994), an artist and illustrator
- Helge Seip (1919–2004), a politician and leader of the Liberal party
- Alf Ramsøy (1925–2014), a long-distance runner, cross-country skier, actor, and farmer
- Sverre Årnes (born 1949), a writer of serial novels, short stories, and articles
- Henning Sommerro (born 1952), a musician, composer and academic
- Lars Steinar Ansnes (born 1956), an editor
- Euronymous (1968–1993), a member of early Norwegian black metal scene whose real name is Øystein Aarseth
- Rune Gjeldnes (born 1971), an adventurer and explorer
- Ivar Loe Bjørnstad (born 1981), a jazz and rock musician

== Media gallery ==
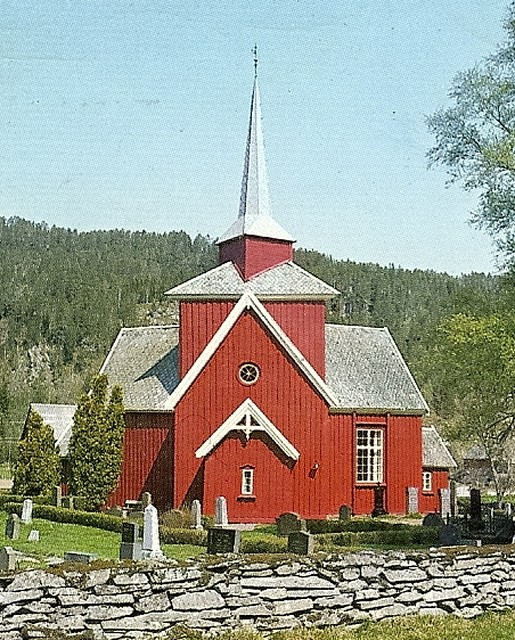
Mo kirke, Surnadal

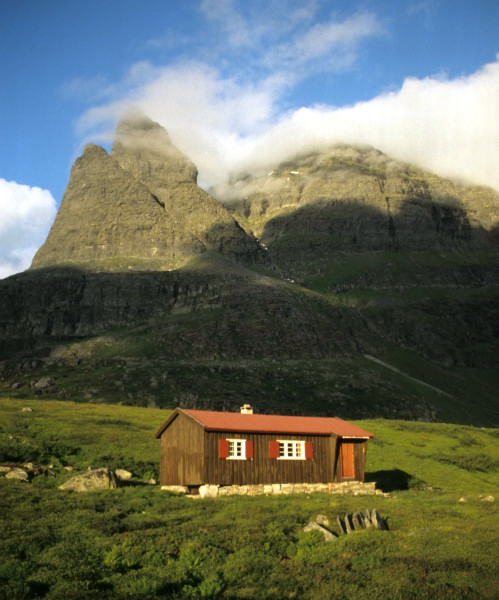
Giklingdalshytta

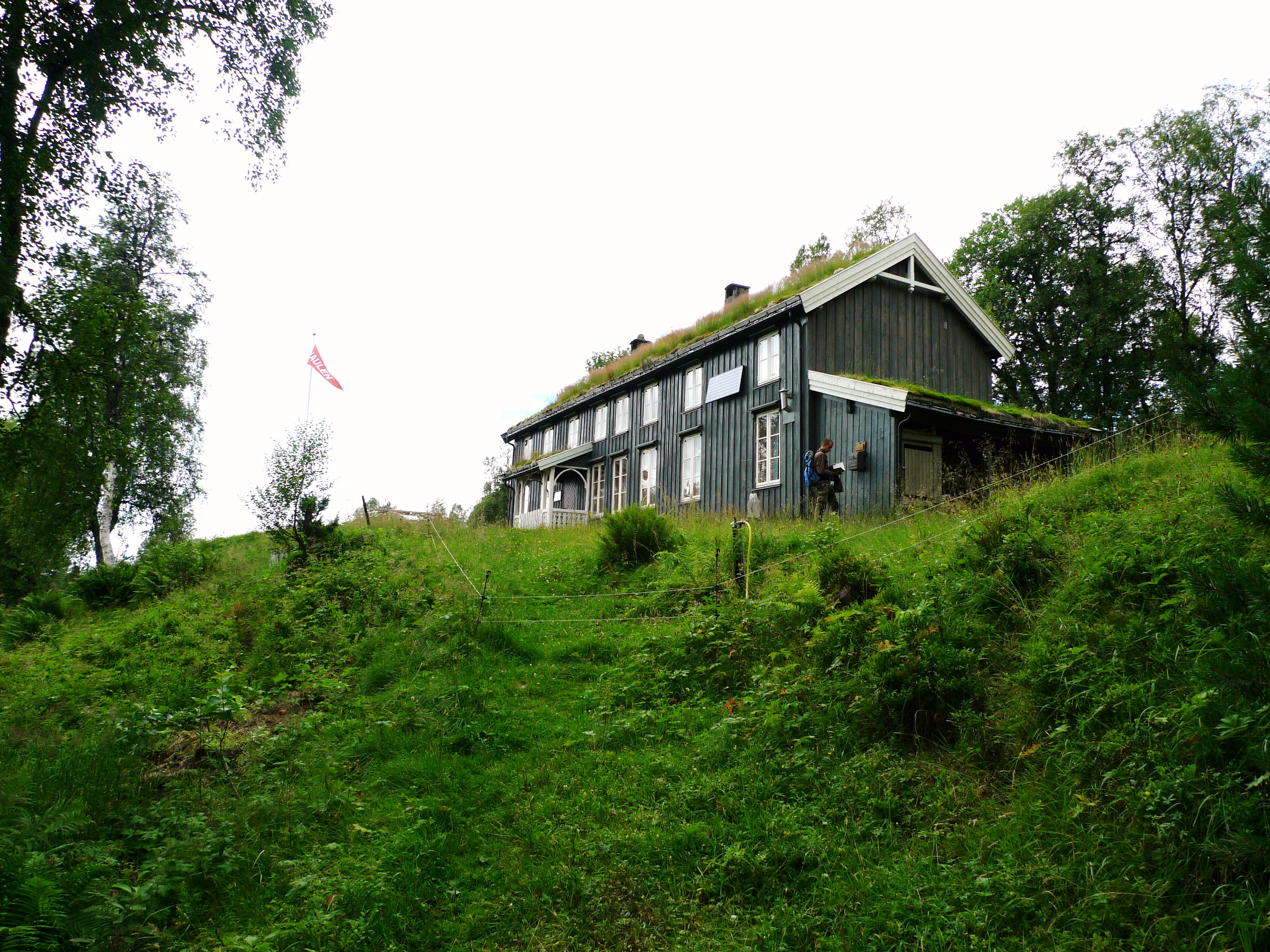
Markagården Vaulen

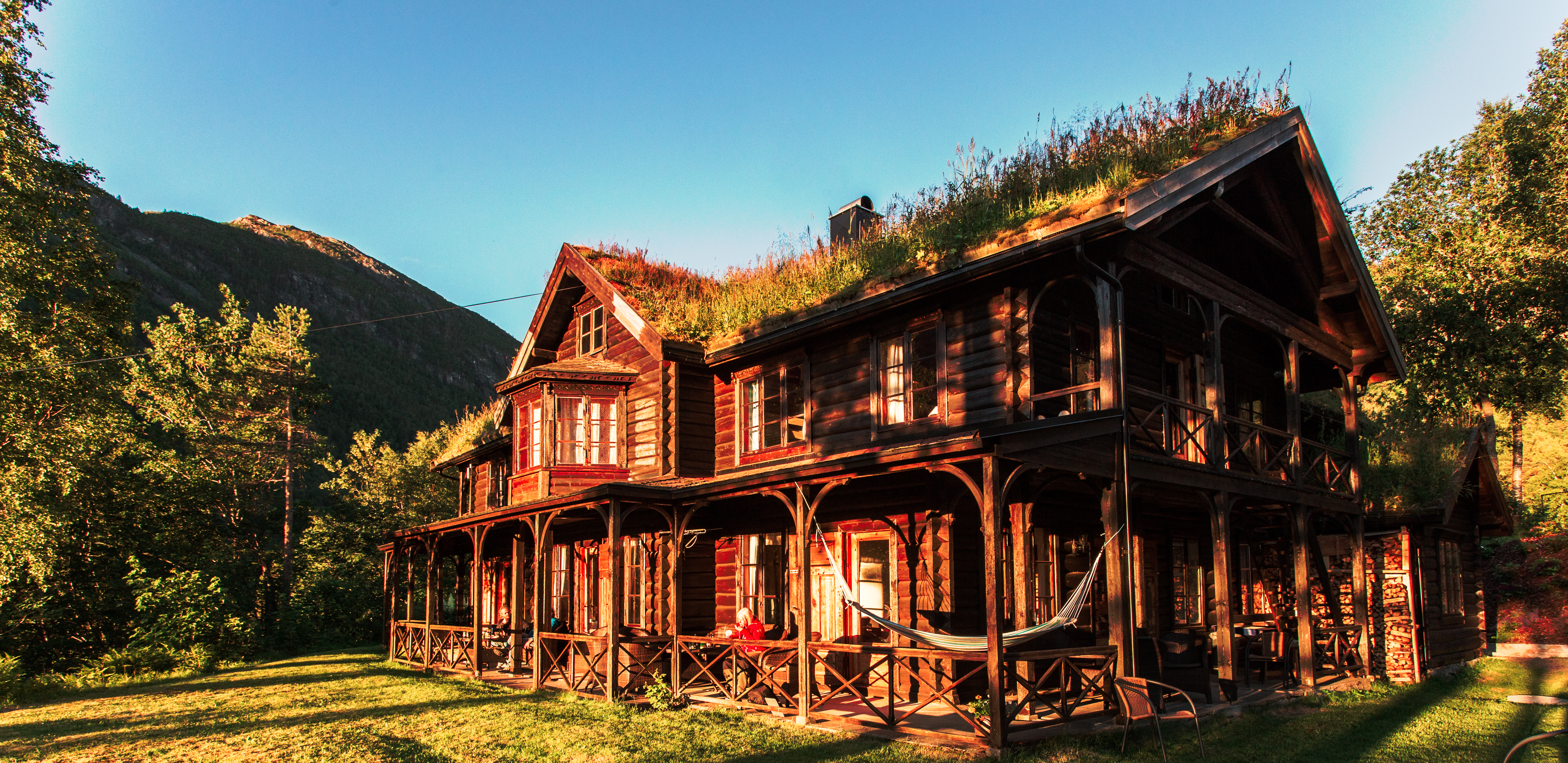
Todalshytta
