= Stangvik Church =

Church in Møre og Romsdal, Norway

- Stangvik kyrkje
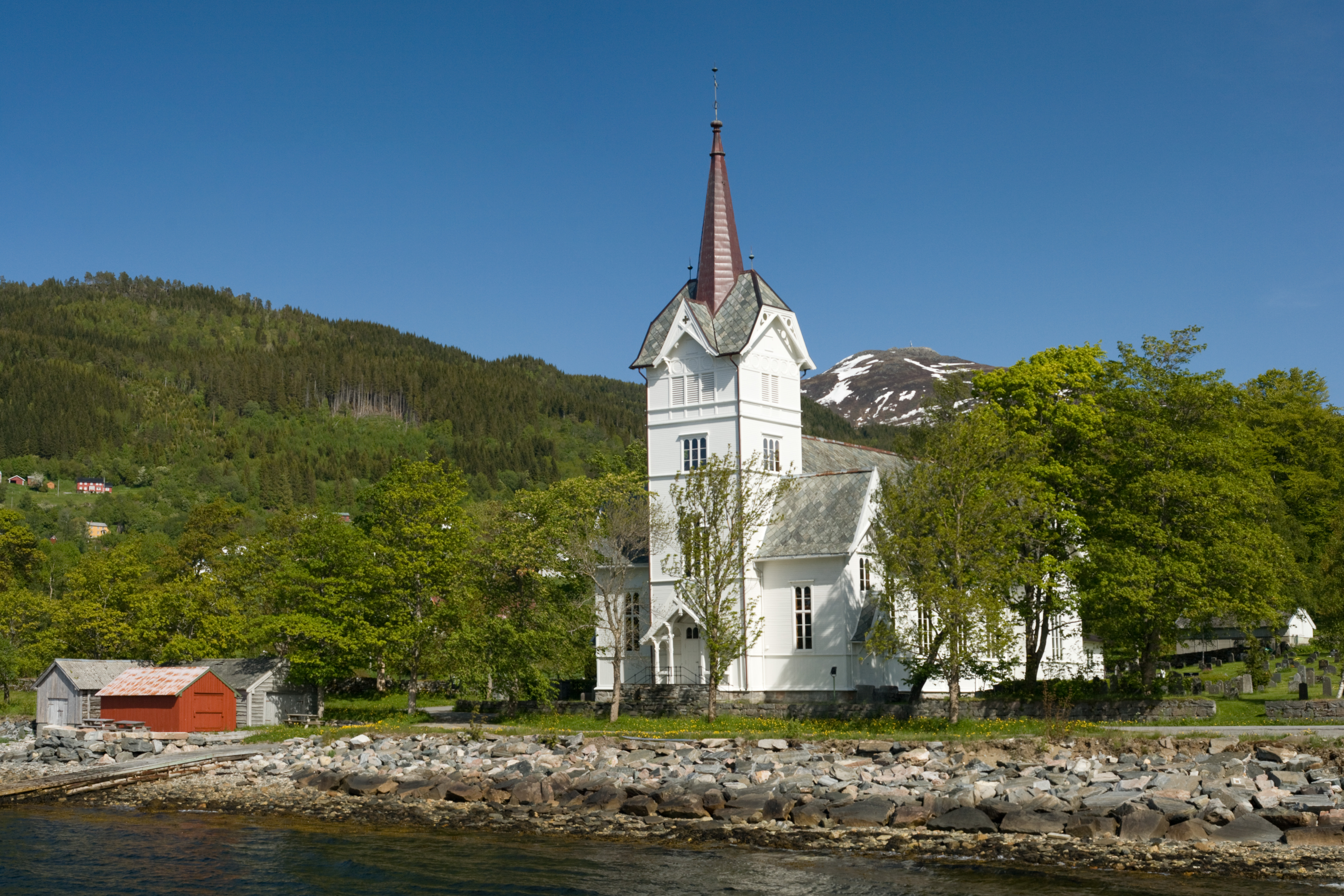
- View of the church
- Stangvik Church
- 62°55′01″N 8°27′33″E
- Location: Surnadal Municipality, Møre og Romsdal
- Country: Norway
- Denomination: Church of Norway
- Churchmanship: Evangelical Lutheran

History
- Status: Parish church
- Founded: 1407
- Consecrated: 2 July 1897

Architecture
- Functional status: Active
- Architect: Karl Norum
- Architectural type: Long church
- Completed: 1897 (129 years ago)

Specifications
- Capacity: 600
- Materials: Wood

Administration
- Diocese: Møre bispedømme
- Deanery: Indre Nordmøre prosti
- Parish: Stangvik
- Norwegian Cultural Heritage Site
- Type: Church
- Status: Listed
- ID: 85548

Stangvik Church (Norwegian: Stangvik kyrkje) is a parish church of the Church of Norway in Surnadal Municipality in Møre og Romsdal county, Norway. It is located in the village of Stangvik on the shores of the Stangvikfjorden. It is the church for the Stangvik parish which is part of the Indre Nordmøre prosti (deanery) in the Diocese of Møre. The white, wooden church was built in a long church design in 1897 using plans drawn up by the architect Karl Norum and the builder Lars Mogstad. The church seats about 600 people, making it the largest church in Nordmøre.

== History ==
The earliest existing historical records of the church date back to 1432 and in that record it states that the church was built in 1407. The first church was a cruciform stave church that was located about 50 metres (160 ft) north of the present church. The church was richly decorated and was probably consecrated to either St. Olaf or the Virgin Mary. The church had a church porch on the west end and a sacristy on the east end. There was a corridor that went around the whole exterior of the building. On 27 November 1783, lightning struck the church which started a fire that burned down the church and surrounding rectory buildings and unfortunately a maid in the rectory was killed in the fire. In the following summer of 1784, a new church was completed on the same site as the old church. The builder was Fredrik Bertelson Eikrem. It was a timber-framed building with a cruciform ground plan, a tower on the roof over the intersection of the transepts and a church porch in both the east and north sides of the church. It was consecrated on 21 January 1785.

In 1814, this church served as an election church (Norwegian: valgkirke). Together with more than 300 other parish churches across Norway, it was a polling station for elections to the 1814 Norwegian Constituent Assembly which wrote the Constitution of Norway. This was Norway's first national elections. Each church parish was a constituency that elected people called "electors" who later met together in each county to elect the representatives for the assembly that was to meet at Eidsvoll Manor later that year.

By the 1880s, the church was rather dilapidated so it was determined to replace the building. This time, a new site was chosen for the church, about 50 metres (160 ft) south of the old church site. The old church was torn down in 1896 and work on the new building was in 1896–1897 on the new site. The new church is a wooden long church with a small sacristy in the east and a tower in the west end. The church was designed by Karl Norum and the lead builder was Lars O. Mogstad. Some materials from the 1784 cruciform church were reused in the new building, primarily in the tower. The new building was consecrated on 2 July 1897.

== Media gallery ==
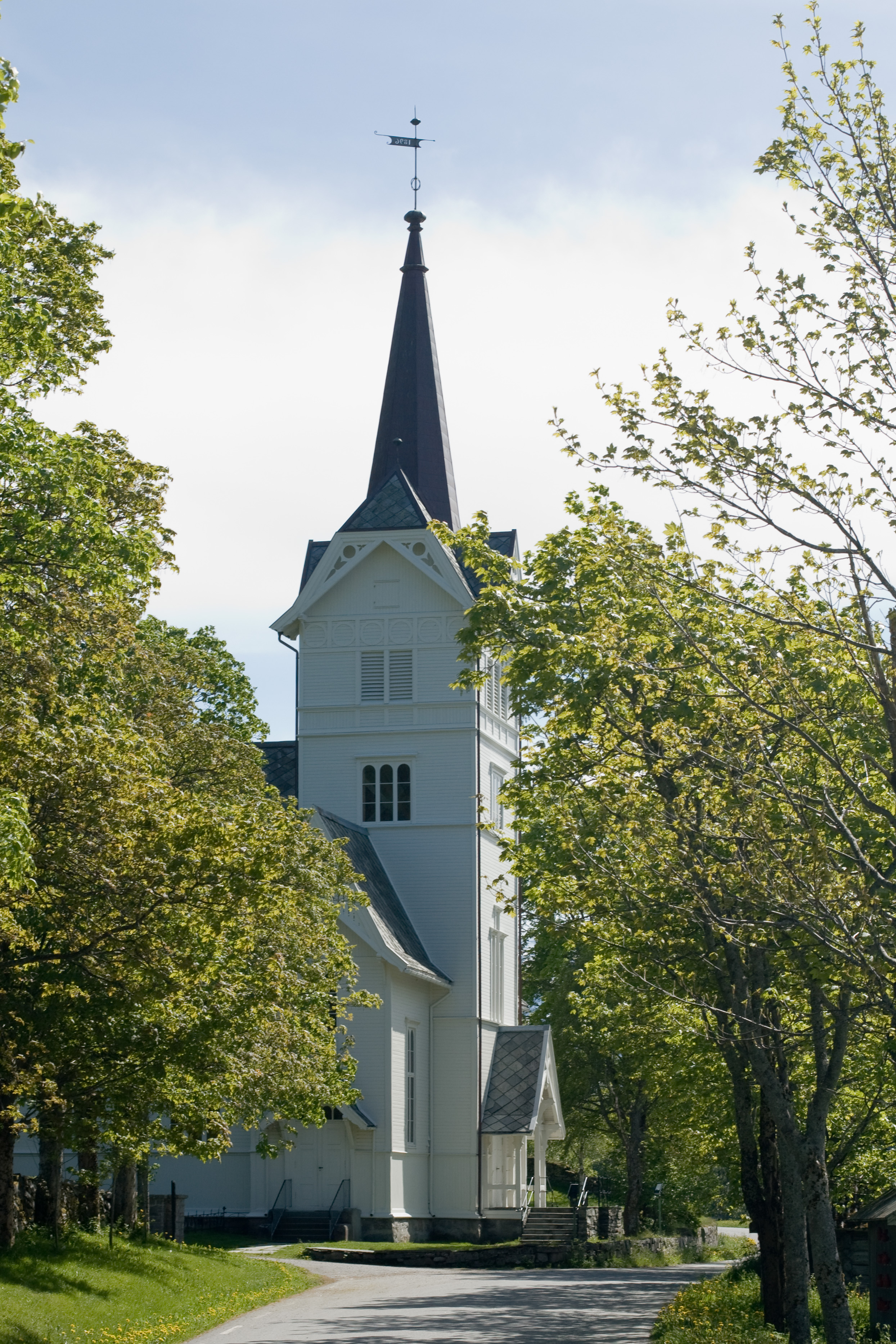

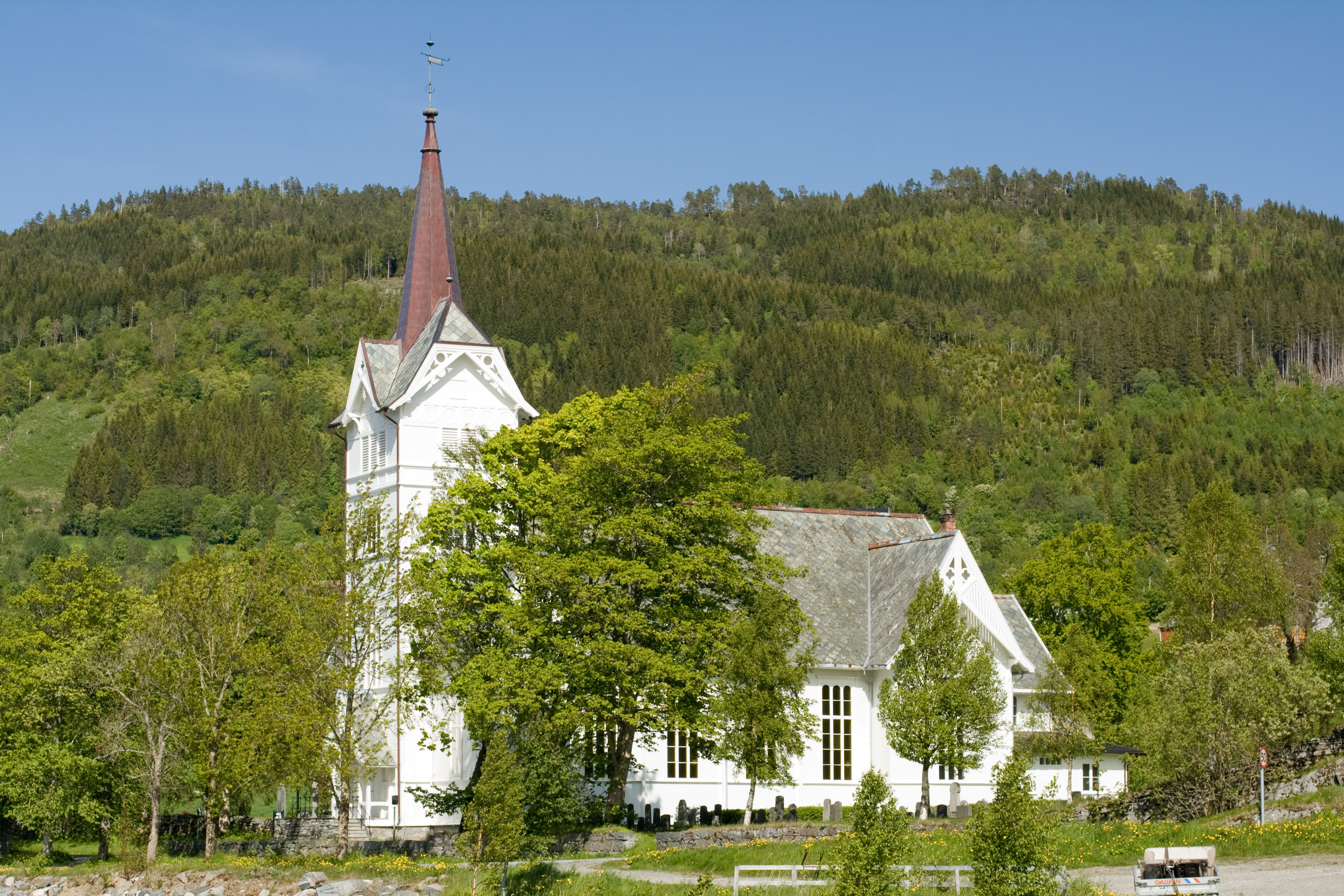

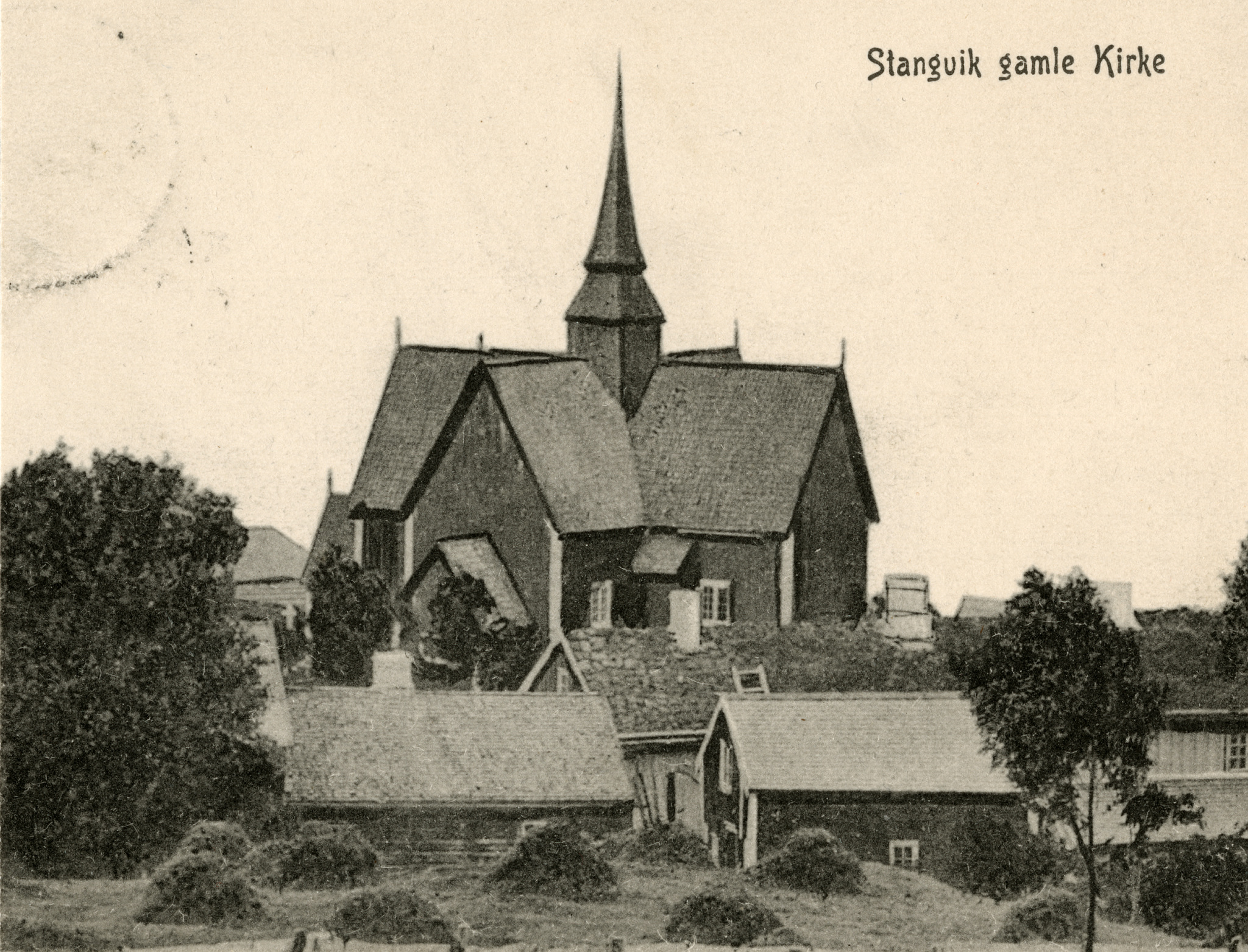

== See also ==
- List of churches in Møre
