= Sylte, Surnadal =

Village in Surnadal Municipality, Norway

Sylte
- Village
- Interactive map of Sylte
- Location within Møre og Romsdal Location within Norway
- Coordinates: 62.9848°N 8.6912°E
- Country: Norway
- Region: Western Norway
- County: Møre og Romsdal
- District: Nordmøre
- Municipality: Surnadal Municipality
- Elevation: 4 m (13 ft)
- Time zone: UTC+01:00 (CET)
  - Summer (DST): UTC+02:00 (CEST)
- Post Code: 6650 Surnadal

Sylte is a village in Surnadal Municipality in Møre og Romsdal county, Norway. The farming village is located at the end of the Surnadalsfjorden at the mouth of the river Surna. It is about 3 kilometres (1.9 mi) southeast of the village of Glærem, about 3 kilometres (1.9 mi) north of the village of Surnadalsøra, and about 2 kilometres (1.2 mi) northeast of the municipal center of Skei. Øye Church lies along the river just east of the village of Sylte.
