= Surnadalsøra =

Village in Surnadal Municipality, Norway

- Village
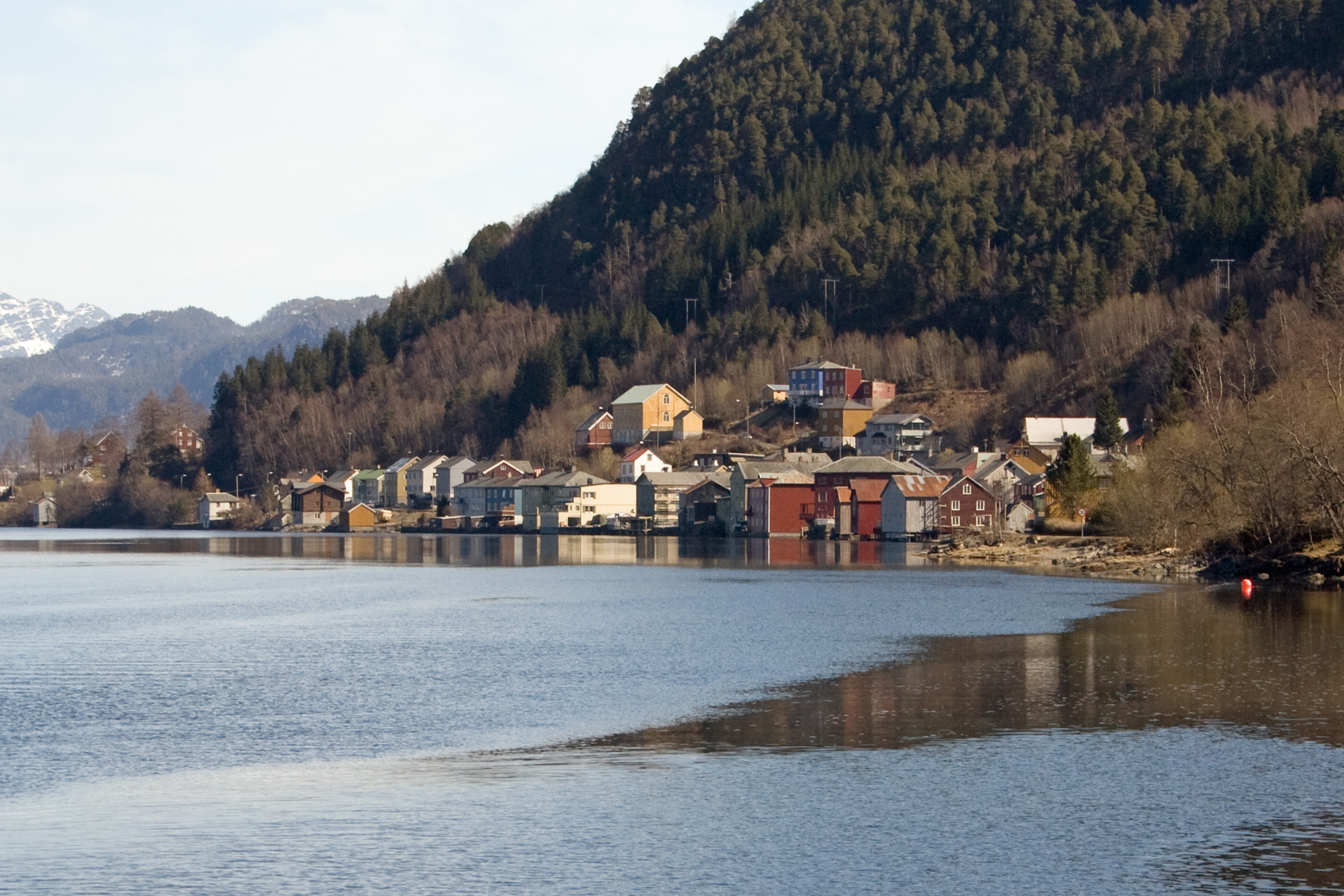
- View of Surnadalsøra
- Interactive map of Surnadalsøra
- Location within Møre og Romsdal Location within Norway
- Coordinates: 62.9697°N 8.6852°E
- Country: Norway
- Region: Western Norway
- County: Møre og Romsdal
- District: Nordmøre
- Municipality: Surnadal Municipality
- Elevation: 15 m (49 ft)
- Time zone: UTC+01:00 (CET)
  - Summer (DST): UTC+02:00 (CEST)
- Post Code: 6650 Surnadal

Surnadalsøra is a village in Surnadal Municipality in Møre og Romsdal county, Norway. It is located at the end of the Surnadalsfjorden, near the mouth of the river Surna. It is located just southwest of the villages of Sylte and Skei.

Surnadalsøra is combined with the neighboring village of Skei as an "urban area" by Statistics Norway. The 3.33-square-kilometre (820-acre) urban area has a population (2024) of 2,870 and a population density of 862 inhabitants per square kilometre (2,230/sq mi).
