= Trongfjorden =

Fjord in Møre og Romsdal, Norway

- Interactive map of the fjord
- Location: Møre og Romsdal county, Norway
- Coordinates: 62.9818°N 8.3132°E
- Type: Fjord
- Basin countries: Norway
- Max. length: 4 kilometres (2.5 mi)

Trongfjorden is a fjord between Surnadal Municipality and Tingvoll Municipality in Møre og Romsdal county, Norway. The fjord is approximately 4 kilometres (2.5 mi) long and is a continuation of the Halsafjorden on the north end near the village of Torjulvågen in Tingvoll Municipality. On the south end, the fjord branches off into several other fjord arms: Hamnesfjorden, Surnadalsfjorden, Stangvikfjorden, and Ålvundfjorden.

== See also ==
- List of Norwegian fjords
