= Ålvundeid Municipality =

Former municipality in Møre og Romsdal, Norway

Ålvundeid Municipality Ålvundeid herred
- Former municipality
- Ulvundeidet herred (historic name)
- Møre og Romsdal within Norway

- Ålvundeid within Møre og Romsdal
- Coordinates: 62°49′33″N 08°31′19″E
- Country: Norway
- County: Møre og Romsdal
- District: Nordmøre
- Established: 1 Jan 1899
  - Preceded by: Øksendal Municipality
- Disestablished: 1 Jan 1960
  - Succeeded by: Sunndal Municipality
- Administrative centre: Ålvundeidet

Government
  - Mayor (1955-1959): Erik L. Walseth (LL)

Area (upon dissolution)
  - Total: 182.4 km^{2} (70.4 sq mi)
  - Rank: #406 in Norway
- Highest elevation: 1,842 m (6,043 ft)

Population (1959)
  - Total: 514
  - Rank: #731 in Norway
  - Density: 2.8/km^{2} (7.3/sq mi)
- Demonym: Eiding

Official language
  - Norwegian form: Nynorsk
- Time zone: UTC+01:00 (CET)
  - Summer (DST): UTC+02:00 (CEST)
- ISO 3166 code: NO-1562

Ålvundeid is a former municipality in Møre og Romsdal county, Norway. The 182-square-kilometre (70 sq mi) municipality existed from 1899 until its dissolution in 1960. It had one of the smallest municipal populations in Norway. It was located in the northeastern part of the present-day Sunndal Municipality. The old municipality included the Innerdalen valley and the southern part of the Ålvund valley area. The administrative centre was the village of Ålvundeidet, also where the Ålvundeid Church is located.

Prior to its dissolution in 1960, the 182.4-square-kilometre (70.4 sq mi) municipality was the 406th largest by area out of the 743 municipalities in Norway. Ålvundeid Municipality was the 731st most populous municipality in Norway with a population of about 514. The municipality's population density was 2.8 inhabitants per square kilometre (7.3/sq mi) and its population had increased by 1.8% over the previous 5-year period.

== General information ==
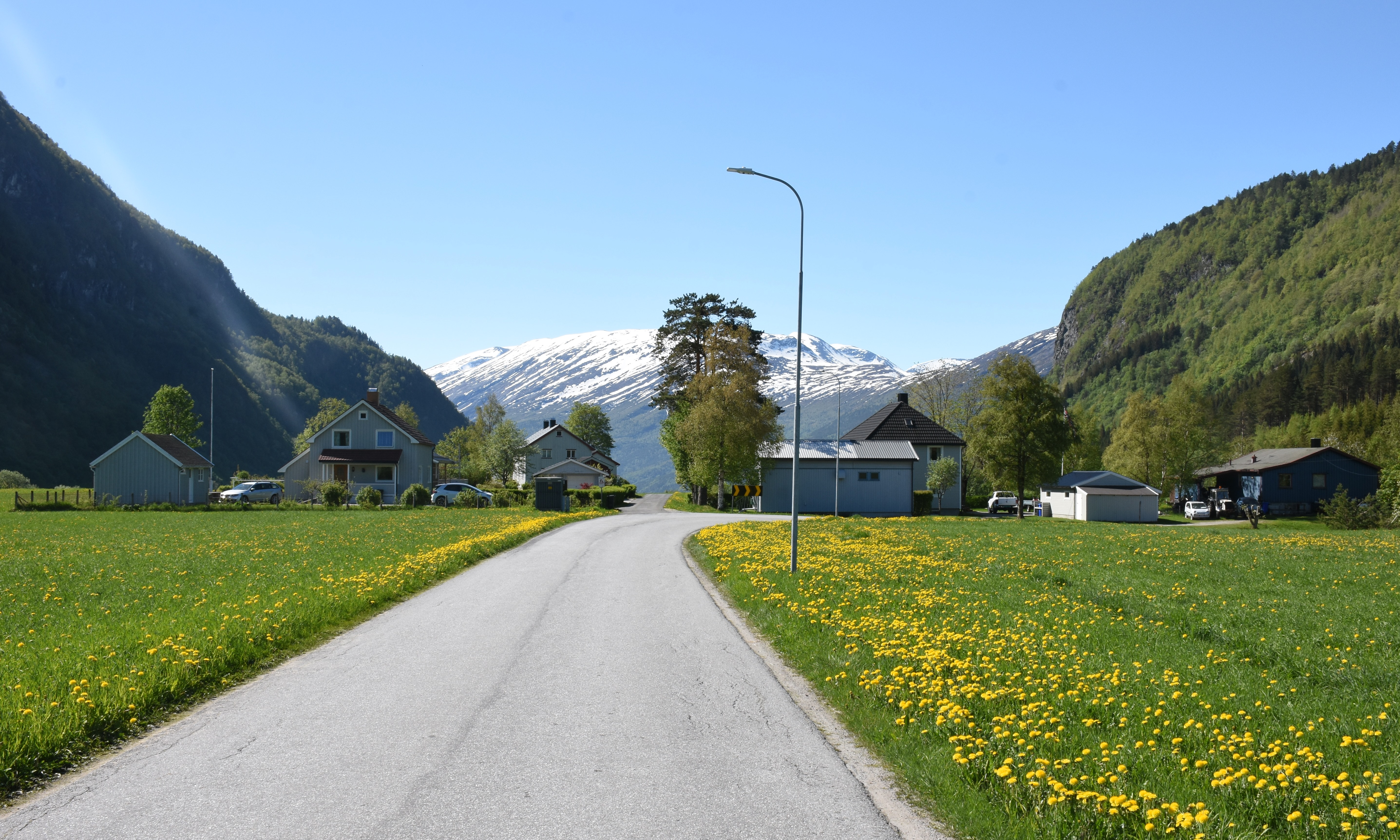
View of the Ålvundeid area

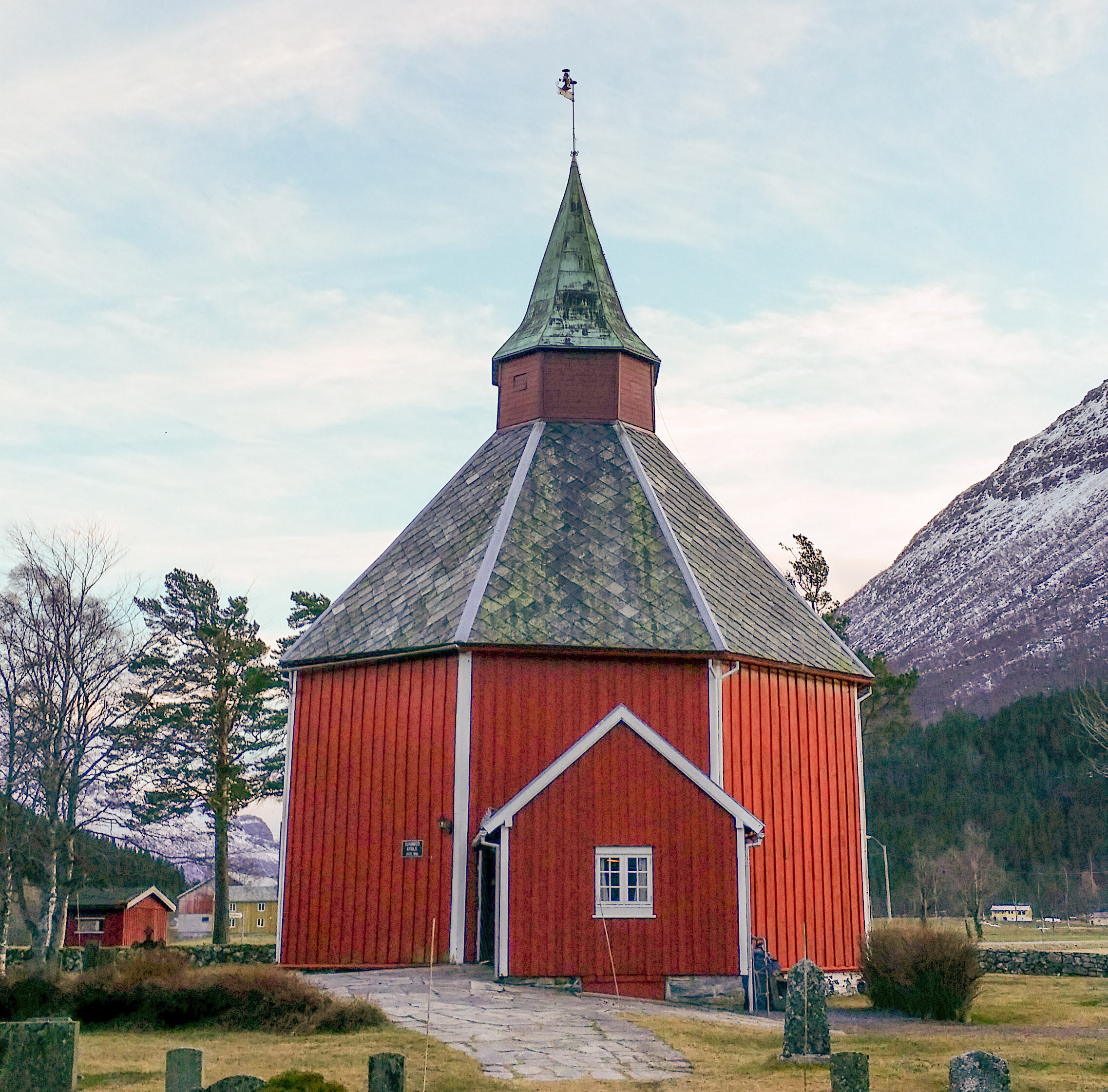
Ålvundeid Church

The municipality of Ulvundeidet was established on 1 January 1899 when it was split off from Øksendal Municipality. The new municipality had an initial population of 462, making it one of the smallest municipalities in the county. The name was later changed to Ålvundeid Municipality.

During the 1960s, there were many municipal mergers across Norway due to the work of the Schei Committee. On 1 January 1960, Ålvundeid Municipality (population: 513) was merged with Øksendal Municipality (population: 497) and Sunndal Municipality (population: 5,851) to form a new, larger Sunndal Municipality.

=== Name ===
The municipality is named after the old Ålvund farm (Old Norse: Ǫlfund) and the isthmus on which it is located. The first element comes from the word alfr which used to mean "gravel" or "gravelly ground". The last element is eið which means "isthmus", since the old farm was located on a small isthmus between the Sunndalsfjorden and the Ålvundfjorden. Historically, the name of the municipality was spelled Ulvundeidet. On 3 November 1917, a royal resolution changed the spelling of the name of the municipality to Aalvundeid. On 21 December 1917, a royal resolution enacted the 1917 Norwegian language reforms. Prior to this change, the name was spelled Aalvundeid with the digraph "Aa", and after this reform, the name was spelled Ålvundeid, using the letter Å instead.

=== Churches ===
The Church of Norway had one parish (sokn) within Ålvundeid Municipality. At the time of the municipal dissolution, it was part of the Øksendal prestegjeld and the Indre Nordmøre prosti (deanery) in the Diocese of Nidaros.

Churches in Ålvundeid Municipality
Parish (sokn)	Church name	Location of the church	Year built
Ålvundeid	Ålvundeid Church	Ålvundeidet	1848

== Geography ==
The municipality was located in the Innerdalen valley on the north side of the Sunndalsfjorden. The highest point in the municipality was the 1,842-metre (6,043 ft) tall mountain Trolla on the border with Sunndal Municipality. The Innerdalstårnet and Vinnufjellet were also located in the southern part of the municipality. The municipality was surrounded by Tingvoll Municipality and Stangvik Municipality to the north, Sunndal Municipality to the south, and Øksendal Municipality to the southwest.

== Government ==
While it existed, Ålvundeid Municipality was responsible for primary education (through 10th grade), outpatient health services, senior citizen services, welfare and other social services, zoning, economic development, and municipal roads and utilities. The municipality was governed by a municipal council of directly elected representatives. The mayor was indirectly elected by a vote of the municipal council. The municipality was under the jurisdiction of the Frostating Court of Appeal.

=== Municipal council ===
The municipal council (Herredsstyre) of Ålvundeid Municipality was made up of 13 representatives that were elected to four year terms. The tables below show the historical composition of the council by political party.

Ålvundeid heradsstyre 1955–1959
Party name (in Nynorsk)	Number of representatives
Labour Party (Arbeidarpartiet)	6
Joint List(s) of Non-Socialist Parties (Borgarlege Felleslister)	7
Total number of members:	13

Ålvundeid heradsstyre 1951–1955
Party name (in Nynorsk)	Number of representatives
Labour Party (Arbeidarpartiet)	4
Joint List(s) of Non-Socialist Parties (Borgarlege Felleslister)	8
Total number of members:	12

Ålvundeid heradsstyre 1947–1951
Party name (in Nynorsk)	Number of representatives
Labour Party (Arbeidarpartiet)	4
Joint List(s) of Non-Socialist Parties (Borgarlege Felleslister)	8
Total number of members:	12

Ålvundeid heradsstyre 1945–1947
Party name (in Nynorsk)	Number of representatives
Labour Party (Arbeidarpartiet)	4
Joint List(s) of Non-Socialist Parties (Borgarlege Felleslister)	8
Total number of members:	12

Ålvundeid heradsstyre 1937–1941*
Party name (in Nynorsk)	Number of representatives
Labour Party (Arbeidarpartiet)	4
Joint List(s) of Non-Socialist Parties (Borgarlege Felleslister)	8
Total number of members:	12
Note: Due to the German occupation of Norway during World War II, no elections were held for new municipal councils until after the war ended in 1945.

=== Mayors ===
The mayor (Nynorsk: ordførar) of Ålvundeid Municipality was the political leader of the municipality and the chairperson of the municipal council. The following people have held this position:

- 1899–1913: Einar Paulsen Børset
- 1914–1919: Lars Eriksen Walseth
- 1920–1928: Anders Pedersen Neergaard
- 1929–1934: Steinar Iversen Mo
- 1935–1937: Anders Pedersen Neergaard
- 1937–1942: Ivar Antonsen Bakken (V)
- 1942–1943: Martinus Røkkum (NS)
- 1943–1945: Olaf O. Engen (NS)
- 1945–1955: Ivar Antonsen Bakken (V)
- 1955–1959: Erik L. Walseth (LL)

== See also ==
- List of former municipalities of Norway
