= Tingvollfjorden (Møre og Romsdal) =

Fjord in Møre og Romsdal, Norway

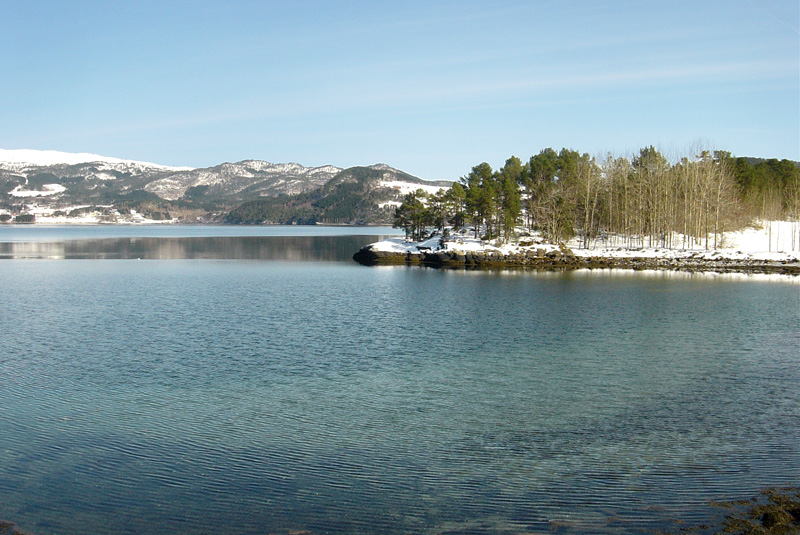
- View of the fjord
- Interactive map of the fjord
- Location: Nordmøre, Norway
- Coordinates: 62.806°N 8.207°E
- Type: Fjord
- Basin countries: Norway
- Max. length: 52 kilometres (32 mi)
- Max. depth: 365 metres (1,198 ft)

Tingvollfjorden is a fjord in Møre og Romsdal county, Norway. The 17-kilometre (11 mi) long fjord passes through Tingvoll Municipality, Gjemnes Municipality, Molde Municipality, and Sunndal Municipality. The inner part of the fjord (within Sunndal Municipality) is called the Sunndalsfjorden. The fjord begins at the island of Bergsøya and stretches about 52 kilometres (32 mi) to the village of Sunndalsøra. The river Driva flows into the fjord at its end. The fjord reaches a maximum depth of 365 metres (1,198 ft) below sea level. Villages along the fjord include Torvikbukt, Flemma, Angvika, Tingvollvågen, Rausand, Jordalsgrenda, Øksendal, Hoem, and Sunndalsøra.

== See also ==
- List of Norwegian fjords
