= Øksendal =

Øksendal may refer to:

== People ==
- Øksendal (surname), a list of people with this surname

== Places ==
- Øksendal (village), a village in Sunndal Municipality in Møre og Romsdal county, Norway
- Øksendal Municipality, a former municipality in Møre og Romsdal county, Norway
- Øksendal Church, a church in Sunndal Municipality in Møre og Romsdal county, Norway
