= Tingvollfjorden =

Tingvollfjorden or Tingvollfjord can refer to:

- Tingvollfjorden (Møre og Romsdal), a fjord in Møre og Romsdal county, Norway
- Tingvollfjorden (Buskerud), a lake in Ål municipality in Buskerud county, Norway
