= Dronningkrona =

Mountain in Sunndal, Norway

- Dronningens krone Dronninga
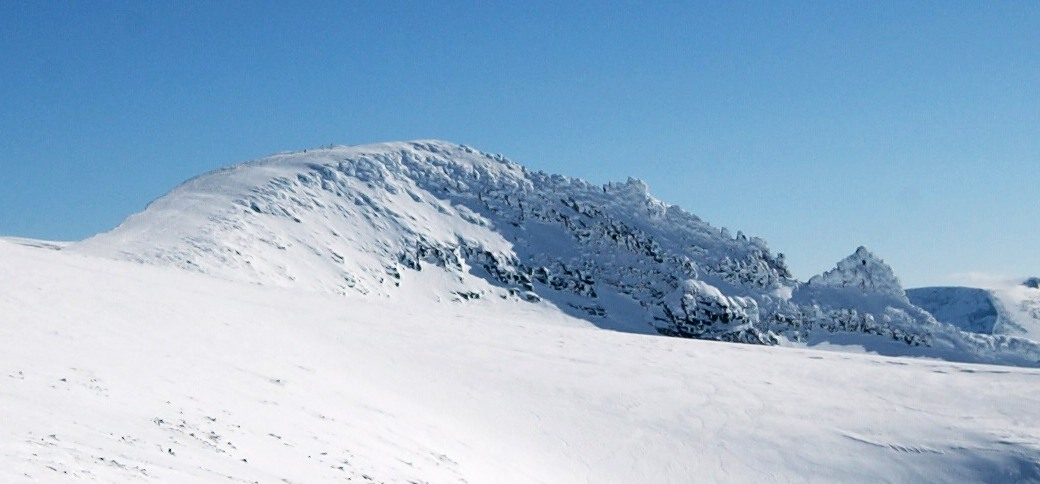
- Summit seen from the northern ridge.

Highest point
- Elevation: 1,816 m (5,958 ft)
- Prominence: 150 m (490 ft)
- Parent peak: Vinnufjellet
- Isolation: 5.15 km (3.20 mi) to Trolla
- Coordinates: 62°41′51″N 08°38′39″E

Geography
- Interactive map of the mountain
- Location: Sunndal Municipality, Møre og Romsdal, Norway
- Parent range: Trollheimen
- Topo map: 1420 III Sunndalsøra

Dronningkrona is a 1,816-metre (5,958 ft) tall mountain peak in Sunndal Municipality in Møre og Romsdal county, Norway. It is one of the two peaks on the main mountain Vinnufjellet. Its neighbor peak is Kongskrona, which reaches 2 metres (6 ft 7 in) higher. The peak is located just 5 kilometres (3.1 mi) northeast of the village of Sunndalsøra and the Sunndalsfjorden.

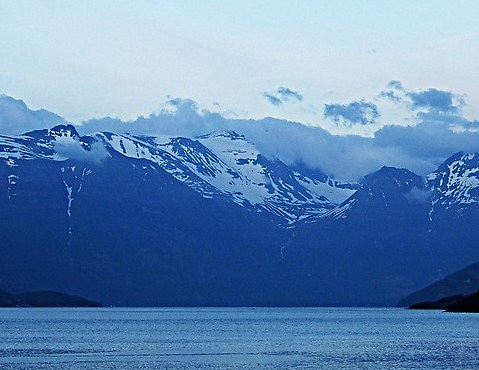
Dronningkrona seen from Sunndalsfjorden.
