= Indre Nordmør =

Norwegian local newspaper

Indre Nordmør (lit. 'Inner Nordmøre') was a Norwegian local newspaper that served the area of Surnadal Municipality, Rindal Municipality, and Halsa Municipality in Møre og Romsdal county.

The newspaper was founded in 1979 by Lars Steinar Ansnes, who also served as the paper's first editor. The main office was in Skei in Surnadal Municipality. It had a circulation of about 2,000. The newspaper was partially owned by Aura Avis which was based in Sunndalsøra. It was issued three days a week until the fall of 1982; it then appeared weekly until it was discontinued in 1991. The newspaper's last editor was Olav Grimsmo. Today Lars Steinar Ansnes is the chief editor of Aura Avis.
