= Tove-Lise Torve =

Norwegian politician

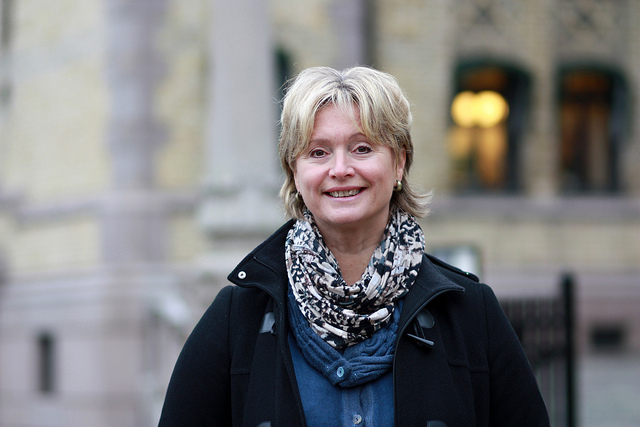
Tove-Lise Torve.

Tove-Lise Torve (born 8 June 1964, in Sunndalsøra) is a Norwegian politician for the Norwegian Labour Party. She was mayor of Sunndal Municipality in Møre og Romsdal from 2007 until her election to the Stortinget in 2009. She was the Labour Party's 3rd candidate in the county, and she is also deputy leader of the Møre og Romsdal Labour Party.

She trained as a Nurse at Molde University College 1985-1987, with additional nurse training 1992-1994, and worked first as a nursing assistant and then as a nurse in a variety of roles 1983-2007.

== Storting committees ==
- 2009–2013 member of The Justice Committee

Political offices
Preceded by Knut Reinset	Mayor of Sunndal Municipality; 2007-2009	Succeeded by Ståle Refsti
