= Ålvundeid Church =

Church in Møre og Romsdal, Norway

- Ålvundeid kyrkje
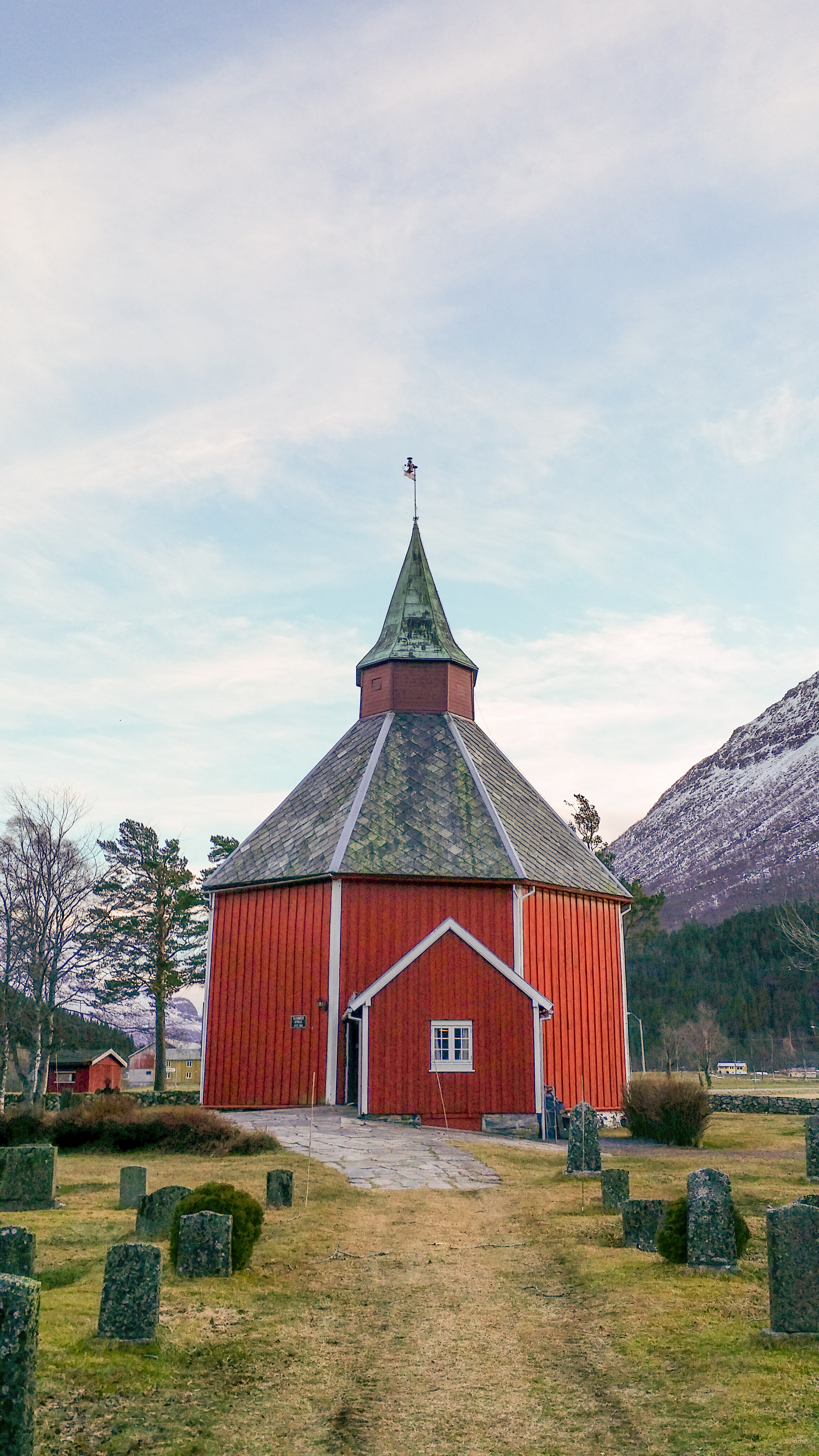
- View of the church
- Ålvundeid Church
- 62°45′57″N 8°32′12″E
- Location: Sunndal Municipality, Møre og Romsdal
- Country: Norway
- Denomination: Church of Norway
- Churchmanship: Evangelical Lutheran

History
- Former name: Aalvund kirke
- Status: Parish church
- Founded: 13th century
- Consecrated: 1 Nov 1848

Architecture
- Functional status: Active
- Architect: Ole Pedersen Tøfte
- Architectural type: Octagonal
- Completed: 1848 (178 years ago)
- Closed: 16th century until 1848

Specifications
- Capacity: 230
- Materials: Wood

Administration
- Diocese: Møre bispedømme
- Deanery: Indre Nordmøre prosti
- Parish: Ålvundeid
- Norwegian Cultural Heritage Site
- Type: Church
- Status: Automatically protected
- ID: 85964

Ålvundeid Church (Norwegian: Ålvundeid kirke) is a parish church of the Church of Norway in Sunndal Municipality in Møre og Romsdal county, Norway. It is located in the village of Ålvundeidet. It is the church for the Ålvundeid parish which is part of the Indre Nordmøre prosti (deanery) in the Diocese of Møre. The red, wooden church was built in an octagonal style in 1848 by the architect Ole Pedersen Tøfte. The church seats about 230 people.

== History ==
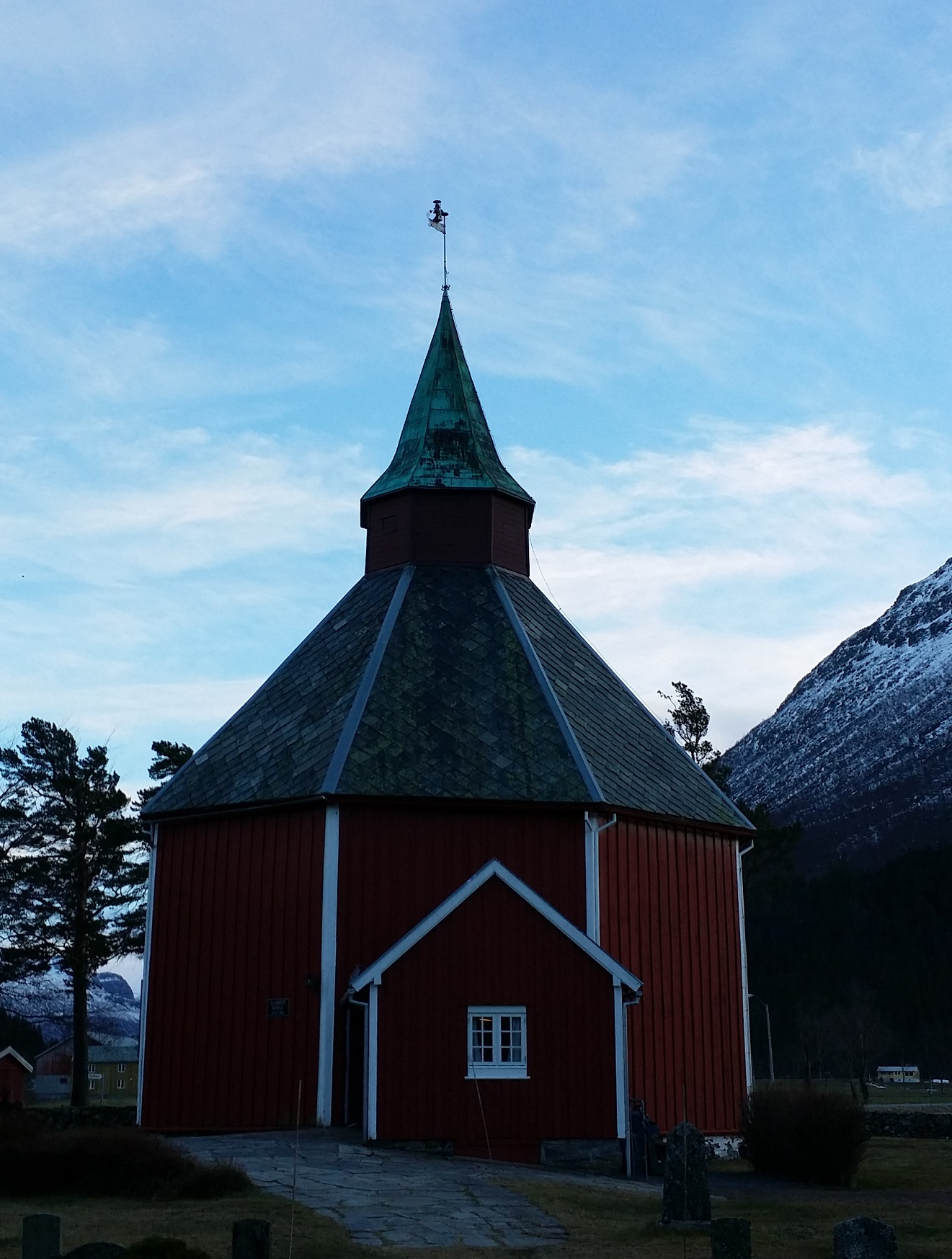
View of the church

The earliest existing historical records of a church in the Ålvundeidet area date back to 1309, but the church was not new that year. The first church was located in the village of Ålvund, about 9 kilometres (5.6 mi) north of the present location in Ålvundeidet. The old church may have been a stave church that was built in the 13th century, but no physical description of the church exists. The old church was part of the Stangvik Church parish and served as an annex church for that parish. The old church was closed and torn down at some point, likely before 1589, and then for some time there was no church here.

In 1838, the new Øksendal Municipality was established and this area became part of that municipality and a part of the Øksendal Church parish. The people of the Ålvundeid area desired their own church so they didn't need to boat across a fjord to attend church services. On 31 March 1847, a royal decree approved the construction of a church in Ålvundeidet. The new church was built in 1848 on a new site in Ålvundeidet, about 9 kilometres (5.6 mi) south of the old medieval church site. It was designed by Ole Pedersen Tøfte. It is an octagonal, wooden church with a tower on the centre of the nave. The church was consecrated on 1 November 1848. In 1865, the Ålvundeid area was split off as its own parish. In 1955, Roar Tønseth designed and built a sacristy and church porch were added to the east and west side of the building, respectively.

== See also ==
- List of churches in Møre
