= Romfo =

Village in Sunndal Municipality, Norway

- Village
- Interactive map of Romfo
- Location within Møre og Romsdal Location within Norway
- Coordinates: 62.6033°N 8.9389°E
- Country: Norway
- Region: Western Norway
- County: Møre og Romsdal
- District: Nordmøre
- Municipality: Sunndal Municipality
- Elevation: 167 m (548 ft)
- Time zone: UTC+01:00 (CET)
  - Summer (DST): UTC+02:00 (CEST)
- Post Code: 6613 Gjøra

Romfo is a village in Sunndal Municipality in Møre og Romsdal county, Norway. The village is located along the river Driva in the Sunndalen valley. The Norwegian National Road 70 runs through the village which is most known as the site of Romfo Church. The village lies about 20 kilometres (12 mi) east of the municipal centre of Sunndalsøra and about 11 kilometres (6.8 mi) northwest of the village of Gjøra. Dovrefjell–Sunndalsfjella National Park lies about 5 kilometres (3.1 mi) south of the village.
