= Lars Steinar Ansnes =

Norwegian editor

Lars Steinar Ansnes (born March 1, 1956) is a Norwegian editor.

Ansnes was born in Surnadal Municipality. He received his examen artium from Tingvoll High School in 1976, and completed the foundation course in Norwegian at Møre og Romsdal Regional College in Volda in 1977. He worked as a journalist for Romsdalsposten from 1977 to 1979, and founded and served as editor of the newspaper Indre Nordmør from 1979 to 1982. He was also a reporter for the paper Stjørdalingen from 1982 to 1984, editorial secretary for the paper Fylket from 1984 to 1987, editor and later manager of Fylket from 1987 to 1985, and editor at TV-Romsdal from 1995 to 1996. Ansnes has been the editor of the newspaper Aura Avis since 1996.
