= Kongskrona =

Mountain in Sunndal, Norway

- Kongens krone
- Interactive map of the mountain

Highest point
- Elevation: 1,818 m (5,965 ft)
- Prominence: 690 m (2,260 ft)
- Parent peak: Vinnufjellet
- Coordinates: 62°41′22″N 08°39′25″E

Geography
- Location: Sunndal Municipality, Møre og Romsdal, Norway
- Parent range: Trollheimen
- Topo map: 1420 III Sunndalsøra

Kongskrona is a 1,818-metre (5,965 ft) tall mountain peak in Sunndal Municipality in Møre og Romsdal county, Norway. It is the higher of the two peaks on the main mountain Vinnufjellet. Its neighbouring peak is Dronningkrona, which is about 2 metres (6 ft 7 in) shorter. The name means King's crown in Norwegian (the neighboring peak Dronningkrona means Queen's crown).

The peak lies about 5 kilometres (3.1 mi) northeast of the village of Sunndalsøra. To the north of the mountain lies the Innerdalen valley. The top of the mountain is a glacier called Vinnubreen or Vinnufonna.
