= Ålvundeidet =

Village in Sunndal Municipality, Norway

Ålvundeidet Ålvundeid
- Village
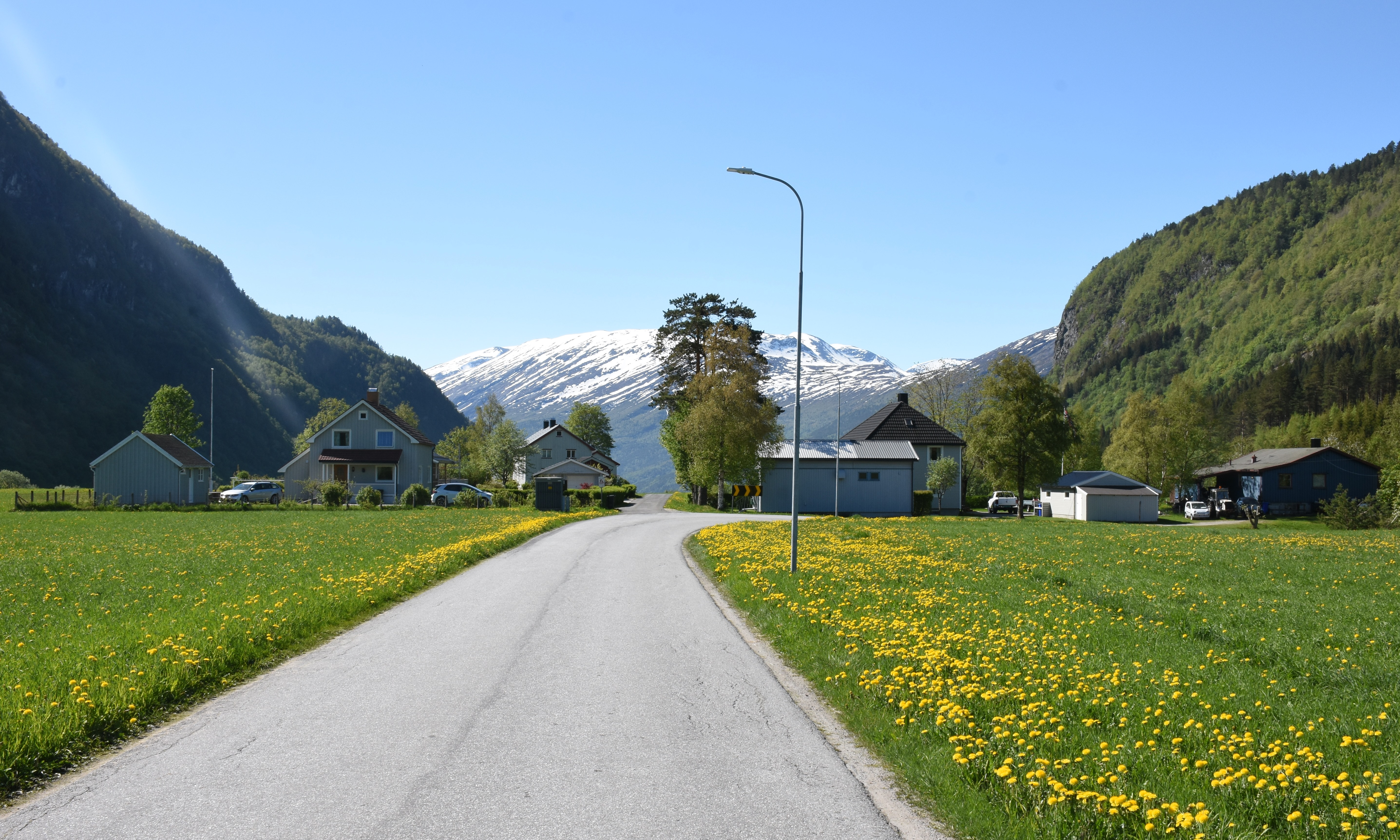
- View of the village
- Interactive map of Ålvundeidet
- Location within Møre og Romsdal Location within Norway
- Coordinates: 62.7713°N 8.5303°E
- Country: Norway
- Region: Western Norway
- County: Møre og Romsdal
- District: Nordmøre
- Municipality: Sunndal Municipality
- Elevation: 137 m (449 ft)
- Time zone: UTC+01:00 (CET)
  - Summer (DST): UTC+02:00 (CEST)
- Post Code: 6620 Ålvundeid

Ålvundeidet is a village in Sunndal Municipality in Møre og Romsdal county, Norway. The village is located at the western end of the Innerdalen valley on an isthmus between two fjords: Ålvundfjorden and Sunndalsfjorden. The village area is located along the Norwegian National Road 70, about halfway between the villages of Ålvund and Sunndalsøra.

== History ==
The village was the administrative centre of the old Ålvundeid Municipality which existed from 1899 until 1960 when it was merged into Sunndal Municipality. The village is home to Ålvundeid Church which serves all of the Ålvundeid parish in northern Sunndal.
