= Vinnufjellet =

Mountain in Møre og Romsdal, Norway

- Interactive map of the mountain

Highest point
- Elevation: 1,818 m (5,965 ft)
- Prominence: 690 m (2,260 ft)
- Isolation: 0.014 km (0.0087 mi)
- Coordinates: 62°41′28″N 8°39′09″E

Geography
- Location: Møre og Romsdal, Norway
- Parent range: Trollheimen
- Topo map: 1420 III Sunndalsøra

Vinnufjellet is an 1,818-metre (5,965 ft) tall mountain in Sunndal Municipality in Møre og Romsdal county, Norway. Vinnufjellet consists of the two peaks named Dronningkrona at 1,816 metres (5,958 ft) and Kongskrona at 1,818 metres (5,965 ft). The names of the two peaks are translated as Queen's crown and King's crown. The mountain is located just northeast of the village of Sunndalsøra and the Sunndalsfjorden. On the south side of the mountain, the Vinnufossen waterfall flows into the river Driva, just east of the village of Hoelsand.
