= Aura Avis =

Norwegian newspaper

- Owner: Amedia (100%)
- Founded: 1947; 79 years ago
- Political alignment: Social democracy
- Headquarters: Sunndalsøra
- Circulation: 3 019 (2022)
- Website: https://auraavis.no

Aura Avis is a Norwegian newspaper, based in Sunndalsøra. It was established in 1947 by Erling Innvik. Innvik edited the newspaper from 1947 to 1954, when he became editor of the Iowa-based Decorah-posten. Aura Avis was then bought by the agency Norsk Arbeiderpresse. Einar Sæter was editor-in-chief from 1954 to 1971. Aura Avis was the only Labour Party newspaper in Norway which had an editorial stand against membership prior to the 1972 Norwegian European Communities membership referendum.

Editor from 1996 is Lars Steinar Ansnes.
