= Anders Endreson Skrondal =

Norwegian politician

Anders Endreson Skrondal (28 July 1891 – 20 December 1968) was a Norwegian politician for the Liberal Party.

He was born in Øksendal.

He served as a deputy representative to the Norwegian Parliament from Møre og Romsdal during the terms 1945–1949, 1950–1953 and 1954–1957. From June 1952 to 1953 he sat as a regular representative, replacing Trygve Utheim who had died.

On the local level Skrondal was a member of Øksendal municipality council from 1928 to 1931, and later served as mayor in the periods 1934–1937, 1937–1940, 1945–1947 and 1951–1955.
