= Øksendal (surname) =

Øksendal is a Norwegian surname. Notable people with the surname include:

- Asbjørn Øksendal (1922–2015), Norwegian novelist and non-fiction writer
- Bernt Øksendal (born 1945), Norwegian mathematician
