= Molde Annonceblad =

Norwegian newspaper

Molde Annonceblad: Avis for Molde og Romsdals Fogderi (lit. 'The Molde Advertiser: A Newspaper for the Molde and Romsdal Bailiwick') was a newspaper published in Molde, Norway from 1893 to 1928.

The paper was edited in the 1910s by Ludvig Eeg (1863–1949), who was succeeded in 1920 by Matias A. Lervik (1881–1954, later editor of Romsdals Budstikke from 1934 to 1936) and Jakob Bolstad (1896–1977). From 1920 to 1924, the paper was edited by Christian Joachim Rieber-Mohn (1891–1959), before he became the editor of Christianssands Tidende.

The newspaper ceased publication in 1928, when the press and its publication rights were purchased by the newspaper Fylket.
