= Sunndal Municipality =

Municipality in Møre og Romsdal, Norway

Sunndal Municipality Sunndal kommune
- Municipality
- Sunndalen herred (historic name)
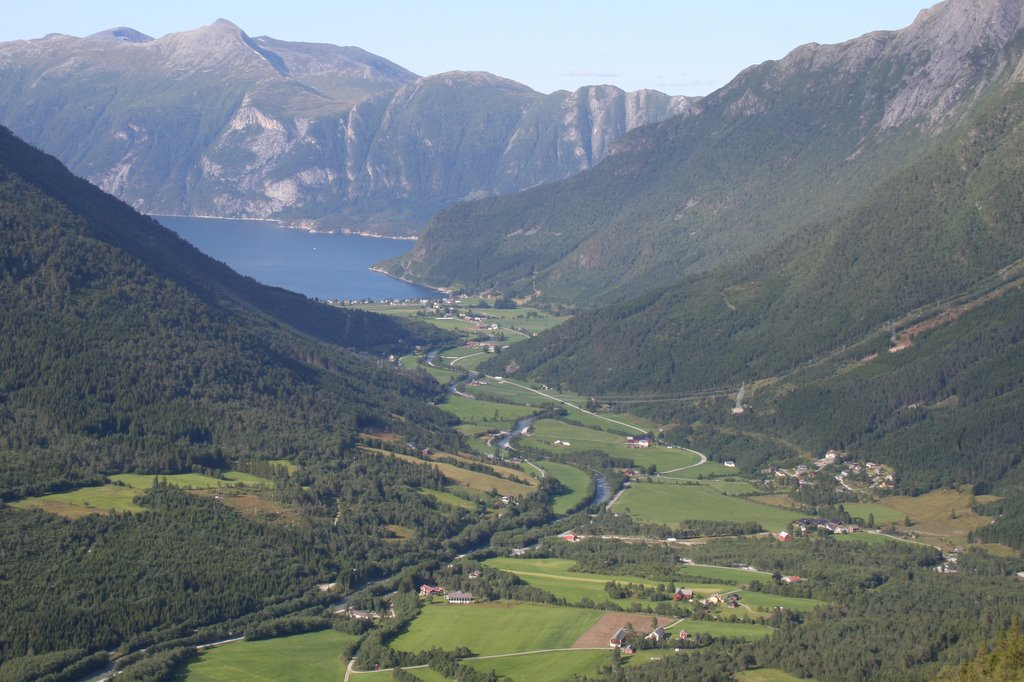
- View of the Øksendal valley

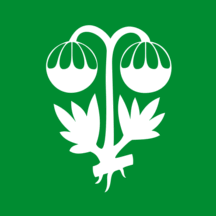
- Flag Coat of arms

- Møre og Romsdal within Norway

- Sunndal within Møre og Romsdal
- Coordinates: 62°36′46″N 08°38′03″E
- Country: Norway
- County: Møre og Romsdal
- District: Nordmøre
- Established: 1 Jan 1838
  - Created as: Formannskapsdistrikt
- Administrative centre: Sunndalsøra

Government
  - Mayor (2009): Ståle Refstie (Ap)

Area
  - Total: 1,713.37 km^{2} (661.54 sq mi)
  - Land: 1,647.76 km^{2} (636.20 sq mi)
  - Water: 65.61 km^{2} (25.33 sq mi) 3.8%
  - Rank: #47 in Norway
- Highest elevation: 1,984.79 m (6,511.8 ft)

Population (2024)
  - Total: 7,227
  - Rank: #143 in Norway
  - Density: 4.2/km^{2} (11/sq mi)
  - Change (10 years): ▲ +0.8%
- Demonym: Sunndaling

Official language
  - Norwegian form: Neutral
- Time zone: UTC+01:00 (CET)
  - Summer (DST): UTC+02:00 (CEST)
- ISO 3166 code: NO-1563
- Website: Official website

Sunndal is a municipality in the Nordmøre region located in the northeast part of Møre og Romsdal county, Norway. The administrative center of the municipality is the village of Sunndalsøra. Other villages include Gjøra, Grøa, Holssanden, Jordalsgrenda, Romfo, Ålvund, Ålvundeidet, and Øksendal. With an area of 1,713 square kilometres (661 sq mi), it is the largest municipality in Møre og Romsdal county. The important occupations in Sunndal include industry (with Hydro Aluminium Sunndal as the biggest employer), public services, retail, and farming.

The 1,713-square-kilometre (661 sq mi) municipality is the 47th largest by area out of the 357 municipalities in Norway and it is the largest by area in Møre og Romsdal county. Sunndal Municipality is the 141st most populous municipality in Norway with a population of 7,227. The municipality's population density is 4.2 inhabitants per square kilometre (11/sq mi) and its population has increased by 0.8% over the previous 10-year period.

== General information ==
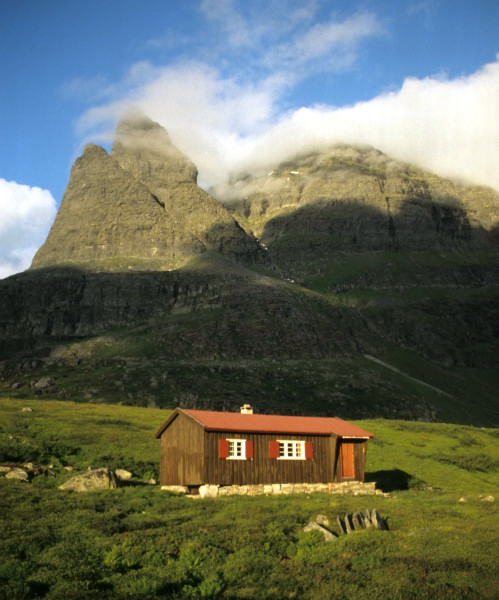
Giklingdalshytta in Innerdalen

The parish of Sunndal was established as a municipality on 1 January 1838 (see formannskapsdistrikt law). In 1854, the northern part of the municipality (population: 1,291) was separated to form the new Øksendal Municipality. This left 2,188 residents in Sunndal Municipality.

During the 1960s, there were many municipal mergers across Norway due to the work of the Schei Committee. On 1 January 1960, the neighboring Ålvundeid Municipality (population: 513) and Øksendal Municipality (population: 497) were merged with Sunndal Municipality (population: 5,851) to form a new, larger Sunndal Municipality. Both Ålvundeid Municipality and Øksendal Municipality were historically part of the municipality before 1854. Then, on 1 January 1965, the Ålvund-Ålvundfjorden area of the neighboring Stangvik Municipality (population: 508) was transferred into Sunndal Municipality.

=== Name ===
The municipality (originally the parish) is named after the Sunndalen valley (Old Norse: Sunndalr). The first element is sunnr or suðr which mean "southern". The last element is dalr which means "valley" or "dale". Historically, the name was spelled Sunddalen (or Sunndalen). In 1870, the spelling was changed to Sundalen. On 3 November 1917, a royal resolution changed the spelling of the name of the municipality to Sunndal, adding an "n" and removing the definite form ending -en.

=== Coat of arms ===
The coat of arms was granted on 12 April 1983. The official blazon is "Vert, a wormwood plant argent" (Norwegian: I grønt en sølv malurt). This means the arms have a green field (background) and the charge is a Norwegian wormwood (Artemisia norvegica) plant. The plant has a tincture of argent which means it is commonly colored white, but if it is made out of metal, then silver is used. The design was chosen in a competition for the municipal arms. This design was chosen since this plant species is only found in a few places in the world. It has its main European distribution in Sunndal Municipality and neighboring Oppdal Municipality in the Dovrefjell-Sunndalsfjella National Park and in Trollheimen landscape protection area. Small populations are also found in Ryfylke, Scotland, and the Ural Mountains, with another subspecies in the mountains of Northern America. This plant can be found in abundance in many places in the mountains of Sunndal well above tree line. The arms were designed by Svein Thuen Rasmussen. The municipal flag has the same design as the coat of arms.

=== Churches ===
The Church of Norway has four parishes (sokn) within Sunndal Municipality. It is part of the Indre Nordmøre prosti (deanery) in the Diocese of Møre.

Churches in Sunndal Municipality
| Parish (sokn) | Church name | Location of the church | Year built |
|---|---|---|---|
| Hov | Hov Church | Sunndalsøra | 1887 |
| Romfo | Romfo Church | Romfo | 1821 |
| Romfo | Gjøra Chapel | Gjøra | 1935 |
| Øksendal | Øksendal Church | Øksendal | 1894 |
| Ålvundeid | Ålvundeid Church | Ålvundeidet | 1848 |

== Geography ==
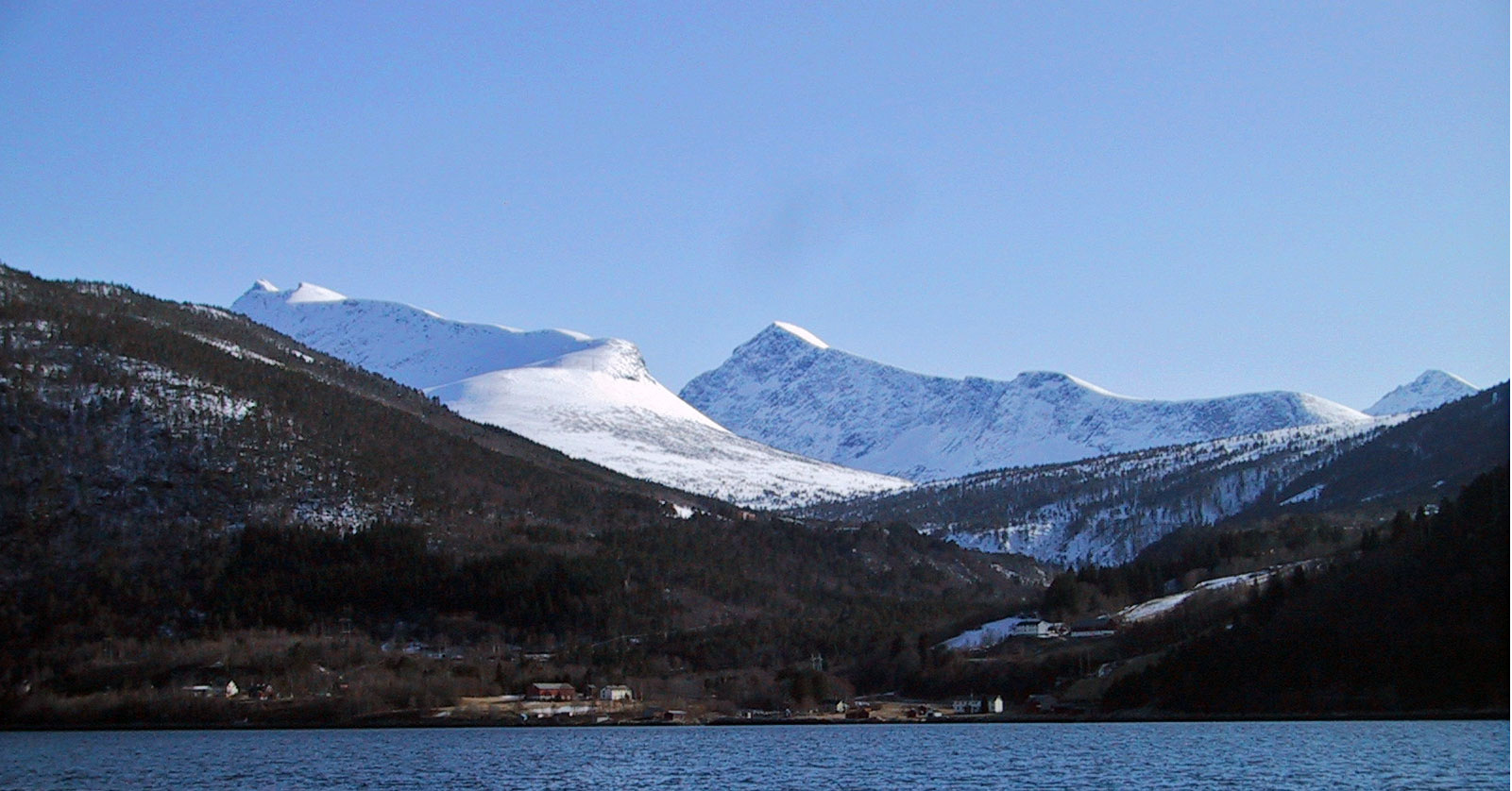
View of the Jordalsgrenda area

Sunndal is bordered on the west by Molde Municipality and Tingvoll Municipality, on the north by Surnadal Municipality, on the east by Oppdal Municipality (in Trøndelag county) and on the south by Lesja Municipality (in Innlandet county).

In the southern part of the municipality lies the Dovrefjell–Sunndalsfjella National Park, home to muskox. In the northern part is the Trollheimen and Innerdalen landscape protection areas.

The municipality centers around the Sunndalsfjorden and the river Driva. The highest point in the municipality is the 1,984.79-metre (6,511.8 ft) tall mountain Storskrymten, a tripoint on the border of Sunndal Municipality, Lesja Municipality, and Oppdal Municipality. There are also many other towering mountains including: Trolla, Vinnufjellet (with peaks Dronningkrona and Kongskrona), Innerdalstårnet, Salhøa, Såtbakkollen, Skarfjellet, and Vassnebba. The Vinnufossen and Svøufallet waterfalls both lie near the river Driva.

== Climate ==
Sunndalsøra has a temperate oceanic climate (Cfb). Atlantic lows can produce a strong foehn effect in winter as the air is forced over the mountains surrounding Sunndalsøra. Sunndalsøra has the national record high for January and February. The record high 33.1 °C (91.6 °F) is from July 2025, and the record low −18.9 °C (−2.0 °F) is from February 2010.

Climate data for Sunndalsøra 1991-2020 (6 m, extremes 1983-2025)
| Month | Jan | Feb | Mar | Apr | May | Jun | Jul | Aug | Sep | Oct | Nov | Dec | Year |
|---|---|---|---|---|---|---|---|---|---|---|---|---|---|
| Record high °C (°F) | 19 (66) | 18.9 (66.0) | 18.4 (65.1) | 22.2 (72.0) | 28.1 (82.6) | 31.9 (89.4) | 33.1 (91.6) | 31.7 (89.1) | 27.6 (81.7) | 25 (77) | 21.6 (70.9) | 18.3 (64.9) | 33.1 (91.6) |
| Mean daily maximum °C (°F) | 5.1 (41.2) | 4.3 (39.7) | 6.9 (44.4) | 10.7 (51.3) | 14.7 (58.5) | 17.6 (63.7) | 19.9 (67.8) | 19.4 (66.9) | 16 (61) | 10.8 (51.4) | 7.5 (45.5) | 5.1 (41.2) | 11.5 (52.7) |
| Daily mean °C (°F) | 1.6 (34.9) | 1.1 (34.0) | 2.9 (37.2) | 6.6 (43.9) | 10.2 (50.4) | 13.1 (55.6) | 15.5 (59.9) | 15.2 (59.4) | 12 (54) | 7.3 (45.1) | 4.3 (39.7) | 1.8 (35.2) | 7.6 (45.8) |
| Mean daily minimum °C (°F) | −1.2 (29.8) | −1.6 (29.1) | 0.1 (32.2) | 3 (37) | 6.3 (43.3) | 9.4 (48.9) | 12 (54) | 11.9 (53.4) | 8.7 (47.7) | 4.4 (39.9) | 1.5 (34.7) | −1.1 (30.0) | 4.4 (40.0) |
| Record low °C (°F) | −16.6 (2.1) | −18.9 (−2.0) | −16 (3) | −6.3 (20.7) | −1 (30) | 0.7 (33.3) | 4 (39) | 0.9 (33.6) | −1.5 (29.3) | −7.3 (18.9) | −11.4 (11.5) | −16.7 (1.9) | −18.9 (−2.0) |
| Average precipitation mm (inches) | 92 (3.6) | 85 (3.3) | 79 (3.1) | 59 (2.3) | 58 (2.3) | 80 (3.1) | 73 (2.9) | 100 (3.9) | 95 (3.7) | 93 (3.7) | 89 (3.5) | 101 (4.0) | 1,004 (39.4) |
| Average precipitation days (≥ 1.0 mm) | 13 | 13 | 14 | 11 | 12 | 15 | 14 | 15 | 13 | 12 | 11 | 12 | 155 |
Source 1: Norwegian Meteorological Institute
Source 2: Noaa WMO averages 91-2020 Norway

== Government ==
Sunndal Municipality is responsible for primary education (through 10th grade), outpatient health services, senior citizen services, welfare and other social services, zoning, economic development, and municipal roads and utilities. The municipality is governed by a municipal council of directly elected representatives. The mayor is indirectly elected by a vote of the municipal council. The municipality is under the jurisdiction of the Nordmøre og Romsdal District Court and the Frostating Court of Appeal. Waste management was provided by the inter-municipal agency Nordmøre Interkommunale Renovasjonsselskap until 2020, after which it merged into ReMidt. Waste collection has since 2018 been operated by ReTrans Midt.

=== Municipal council ===
The municipal council (Kommunestyre) of Sunndal Municipality is made up of 27 representatives that are elected to four year terms. The tables below show the current and historical composition of the council by political party.

Sunndal kommunestyre 2023–2027
| Party name (in Norwegian) | Number of representatives |
|---|---|
| Labour Party (Arbeiderpartiet) | 11 |
| Progress Party (Fremskrittspartiet) | 3 |
| Conservative Party (Høyre) | 5 |
| Christian Democratic Party (Kristelig Folkeparti) | 1 |
| Red Party (Rødt) | 1 |
| Centre Party (Senterpartiet) | 3 |
| Socialist Left Party (Sosialistisk Venstreparti) | 2 |
| Liberal Party (Venstre) | 1 |
| Total number of members: | 27 |

Sunndal kommunestyre 2019–2023
| Party name (in Norwegian) | Number of representatives |
|---|---|
| Labour Party (Arbeiderpartiet) | 11 |
| Progress Party (Fremskrittspartiet) | 3 |
| Green Party (Miljøpartiet De Grønne) | 1 |
| Conservative Party (Høyre) | 2 |
| Christian Democratic Party (Kristelig Folkeparti) | 1 |
| Centre Party (Senterpartiet) | 6 |
| Socialist Left Party (Sosialistisk Venstreparti) | 2 |
| Liberal Party (Venstre) | 1 |
| Total number of members: | 27 |

Sunndal kommunestyre 2015–2019
| Party name (in Norwegian) | Number of representatives |
|---|---|
| Labour Party (Arbeiderpartiet) | 15 |
| Progress Party (Fremskrittspartiet) | 3 |
| Conservative Party (Høyre) | 1 |
| Christian Democratic Party (Kristelig Folkeparti) | 1 |
| Centre Party (Senterpartiet) | 4 |
| Socialist Left Party (Sosialistisk Venstreparti) | 2 |
| Liberal Party (Venstre) | 1 |
| Total number of members: | 27 |

Sunndal kommunestyre 2011–2015
| Party name (in Norwegian) | Number of representatives |
|---|---|
| Labour Party (Arbeiderpartiet) | 16 |
| Progress Party (Fremskrittspartiet) | 3 |
| Conservative Party (Høyre) | 3 |
| Christian Democratic Party (Kristelig Folkeparti) | 1 |
| Centre Party (Senterpartiet) | 2 |
| Socialist Left Party (Sosialistisk Venstreparti) | 1 |
| Liberal Party (Venstre) | 1 |
| Total number of members: | 27 |

Sunndal kommunestyre 2007–2011
| Party name (in Norwegian) | Number of representatives |
|---|---|
| Labour Party (Arbeiderpartiet) | 12 |
| Progress Party (Fremskrittspartiet) | 4 |
| Conservative Party (Høyre) | 2 |
| Christian Democratic Party (Kristelig Folkeparti) | 1 |
| Centre Party (Senterpartiet) | 5 |
| Socialist Left Party (Sosialistisk Venstreparti) | 2 |
| Liberal Party (Venstre) | 1 |
| Total number of members: | 27 |

Sunndal kommunestyre 2003–2007
| Party name (in Norwegian) | Number of representatives |
|---|---|
| Labour Party (Arbeiderpartiet) | 10 |
| Progress Party (Fremskrittspartiet) | 5 |
| Conservative Party (Høyre) | 2 |
| Christian Democratic Party (Kristelig Folkeparti) | 1 |
| Centre Party (Senterpartiet) | 5 |
| Socialist Left Party (Sosialistisk Venstreparti) | 2 |
| Liberal Party (Venstre) | 2 |
| Total number of members: | 27 |

Sunndal kommunestyre 1999–2003
| Party name (in Norwegian) | Number of representatives |
|---|---|
| Labour Party (Arbeiderpartiet) | 19 |
| Conservative Party (Høyre) | 5 |
| Christian Democratic Party (Kristelig Folkeparti) | 3 |
| Centre Party (Senterpartiet) | 4 |
| Socialist Left Party (Sosialistisk Venstreparti) | 4 |
| Liberal Party (Venstre) | 2 |
| Total number of members: | 37 |

Sunndal kommunestyre 1995–1999
| Party name (in Norwegian) | Number of representatives |
|---|---|
| Labour Party (Arbeiderpartiet) | 20 |
| Conservative Party (Høyre) | 4 |
| Christian Democratic Party (Kristelig Folkeparti) | 3 |
| Centre Party (Senterpartiet) | 6 |
| Socialist Left Party (Sosialistisk Venstreparti) | 2 |
| Liberal Party (Venstre) | 2 |
| Total number of members: | 37 |

Sunndal kommunestyre 1991–1995
| Party name (in Norwegian) | Number of representatives |
|---|---|
| Labour Party (Arbeiderpartiet) | 19 |
| Conservative Party (Høyre) | 5 |
| Christian Democratic Party (Kristelig Folkeparti) | 2 |
| Centre Party (Senterpartiet) | 5 |
| Socialist Left Party (Sosialistisk Venstreparti) | 4 |
| Liberal Party (Venstre) | 2 |
| Total number of members: | 37 |

Sunndal kommunestyre 1987–1991
| Party name (in Norwegian) | Number of representatives |
|---|---|
| Labour Party (Arbeiderpartiet) | 19 |
| Conservative Party (Høyre) | 4 |
| Christian Democratic Party (Kristelig Folkeparti) | 3 |
| Centre Party (Senterpartiet) | 5 |
| Socialist Left Party (Sosialistisk Venstreparti) | 3 |
| Liberal Party (Venstre) | 3 |
| Total number of members: | 37 |

Sunndal kommunestyre 1983–1987
| Party name (in Norwegian) | Number of representatives |
|---|---|
| Labour Party (Arbeiderpartiet) | 18 |
| Conservative Party (Høyre) | 5 |
| Christian Democratic Party (Kristelig Folkeparti) | 3 |
| Centre Party (Senterpartiet) | 6 |
| Socialist Left Party (Sosialistisk Venstreparti) | 3 |
| Liberal Party (Venstre) | 2 |
| Total number of members: | 37 |

Sunndal kommunestyre 1979–1983
| Party name (in Norwegian) | Number of representatives |
|---|---|
| Labour Party (Arbeiderpartiet) | 17 |
| Conservative Party (Høyre) | 5 |
| Christian Democratic Party (Kristelig Folkeparti) | 3 |
| Centre Party (Senterpartiet) | 6 |
| Socialist Left Party (Sosialistisk Venstreparti) | 3 |
| Liberal Party (Venstre) | 3 |
| Total number of members: | 37 |

Sunndal kommunestyre 1975–1979
| Party name (in Norwegian) | Number of representatives |
|---|---|
| Labour Party (Arbeiderpartiet) | 19 |
| Conservative Party (Høyre) | 3 |
| Christian Democratic Party (Kristelig Folkeparti) | 4 |
| Centre Party (Senterpartiet) | 7 |
| Socialist Left Party (Sosialistisk Venstreparti) | 2 |
| Free Candidates List (Frie Kandidaters Liste) | 1 |
| Sunndal Free Voters Independent List (Sunndal Frie Velgeres Uavhengige Liste) | 1 |
| Total number of members: | 37 |

Sunndal kommunestyre 1971–1975
| Party name (in Norwegian) | Number of representatives |
|---|---|
| Labour Party (Arbeiderpartiet) | 19 |
| Conservative Party (Høyre) | 2 |
| Christian Democratic Party (Kristelig Folkeparti) | 2 |
| Centre Party (Senterpartiet) | 6 |
| Liberal Party (Venstre) | 1 |
| Local List(s) (Lokale lister) | 7 |
| Total number of members: | 37 |

Sunndal kommunestyre 1967–1971
| Party name (in Norwegian) | Number of representatives |
|---|---|
| Labour Party (Arbeiderpartiet) | 21 |
| Conservative Party (Høyre) | 3 |
| Christian Democratic Party (Kristelig Folkeparti) | 2 |
| Centre Party (Senterpartiet) | 7 |
| Socialist People's Party (Sosialistisk Folkeparti) | 1 |
| Liberal Party (Venstre) | 3 |
| Total number of members: | 37 |

Sunndal kommunestyre 1963–1967
| Party name (in Norwegian) | Number of representatives |
|---|---|
| Labour Party (Arbeiderpartiet) | 21 |
| Conservative Party (Høyre) | 4 |
| Christian Democratic Party (Kristelig Folkeparti) | 2 |
| Centre Party (Senterpartiet) | 6 |
| Socialist People's Party (Sosialistisk Folkeparti) | 2 |
| Liberal Party (Venstre) | 2 |
| Total number of members: | 37 |

Sunndal herredsstyre 1959–1963
| Party name (in Norwegian) | Number of representatives |
|---|---|
| Labour Party (Arbeiderpartiet) | 20 |
| Conservative Party (Høyre) | 3 |
| Christian Democratic Party (Kristelig Folkeparti) | 2 |
| Centre Party (Senterpartiet) | 7 |
| Liberal Party (Venstre) | 5 |
| Total number of members: | 37 |

Sunndal herredsstyre 1955–1959
| Party name (in Norwegian) | Number of representatives |
|---|---|
| Labour Party (Arbeiderpartiet) | 15 |
| Christian Democratic Party (Kristelig Folkeparti) | 2 |
| Joint List(s) of Non-Socialist Parties (Borgerlige Felleslister) | 8 |
| Total number of members: | 25 |

Sunndal herredsstyre 1951–1955
| Party name (in Norwegian) | Number of representatives |
|---|---|
| Labour Party (Arbeiderpartiet) | 8 |
| Christian Democratic Party (Kristelig Folkeparti) | 1 |
| Joint List(s) of Non-Socialist Parties (Borgerlige Felleslister) | 7 |
| Total number of members: | 16 |

Sunndal herredsstyre 1947–1951
| Party name (in Norwegian) | Number of representatives |
|---|---|
| Labour Party (Arbeiderpartiet) | 6 |
| Joint List(s) of Non-Socialist Parties (Borgerlige Felleslister) | 10 |
| Total number of members: | 16 |

Sunndal herredsstyre 1945–1947
| Party name (in Norwegian) | Number of representatives |
|---|---|
| Labour Party (Arbeiderpartiet) | 5 |
| Joint List(s) of Non-Socialist Parties (Borgerlige Felleslister) | 11 |
| Total number of members: | 16 |

Sunndal herredsstyre 1937–1941*
| Party name (in Norwegian) | Number of representatives |
|---|---|
| Labour Party (Arbeiderpartiet) | 4 |
| Farmers' Party (Bondepartiet) | 7 |
| Joint List(s) of Non-Socialist Parties (Borgerlige Felleslister) | 5 |
| Total number of members: | 16 |
Note: Due to the German occupation of Norway during World War II, no elections were held for new municipal councils until after the war ended in 1945.

=== Mayors ===
The mayor (Norwegian: ordfører) of Sunndal Municipality is the political leader of the municipality and the chairperson of the municipal council. Here is a list of people who have held this position:

- 1838–1839: Jørgen Dalsbø
- 1840–1843: Ole Christian Berner
- 1843–1843: Anders Bjørnhjell
- 1844–1845: Jørgen Dalsbø
- 1846–1849: Christen Mamen Glückstad
- 1850–1851: Anders Andersen Aaram
- 1852–1853: Lars Olsen Haaven
- 1854–1857: Lars Olsen Haaven
- 1858–1861: Christian August Randers
- 1862–1865: John Larsen Haaven
- 1866–1868: Christian August Randers
- 1869–1871: Ole Olsen Vennevold
- 1872–1885: John Olsen Flatvad (V)
- 1886–1887: Ole Olsen Vennevold (V)
- 1888–1889: Endre Gunnarsen Nisja (MV)
- 1890–1891: John Olsen Flatvad (V)
- 1892–1895: Peder Toresen Hoaas (V)
- 1896–1901: Ingebrigt Gunnarsen Forseth (V)
- 1902–1910: Gunnar Endresen Nisja (V)
- 1911–1913: Lars Pedersen (V)
- 1914–1916: Gunnar Ingebrigtsen Forseth (V)
- 1917–1919: Lars Pedersen (V)
- 1920–1922: Gunnar Endresen Nisja (V)
- 1923–1924: Petter Pedersen Vik (Bp)
- 1924–1925: Edvard Svanøe (FV)
- 1926–1937: Gunnar Ingebrigtsen Forseth (Bp)
- 1938–1941: Johan Sletnes (V)
- 1941–1945: Henrik Børseth (NS)
- 1945–1945: Johan Sletnes (V)
- 1946–1951: Nils Walseth (V)
- 1952–1958: Ole Bruset (Ap)
- 1958–1959: Harald Romundset (Ap)
- 1960–1973: Oskar Edøy (Ap)
- 1974–1975: Bjarne Sundstrøm (Ap)
- 1976–1979: Jakob Veiset (Ap)
- 1980–1987: Reidun Romfo (Ap)
- 1988–2003: Jan Silseth (Ap)
- 2003–2007: Knut Reinset (Sp)
- 2007–2009: Tove-Lise Torve (Ap)
- 2009–present: Ståle Refstie (Ap)

== Notable people ==
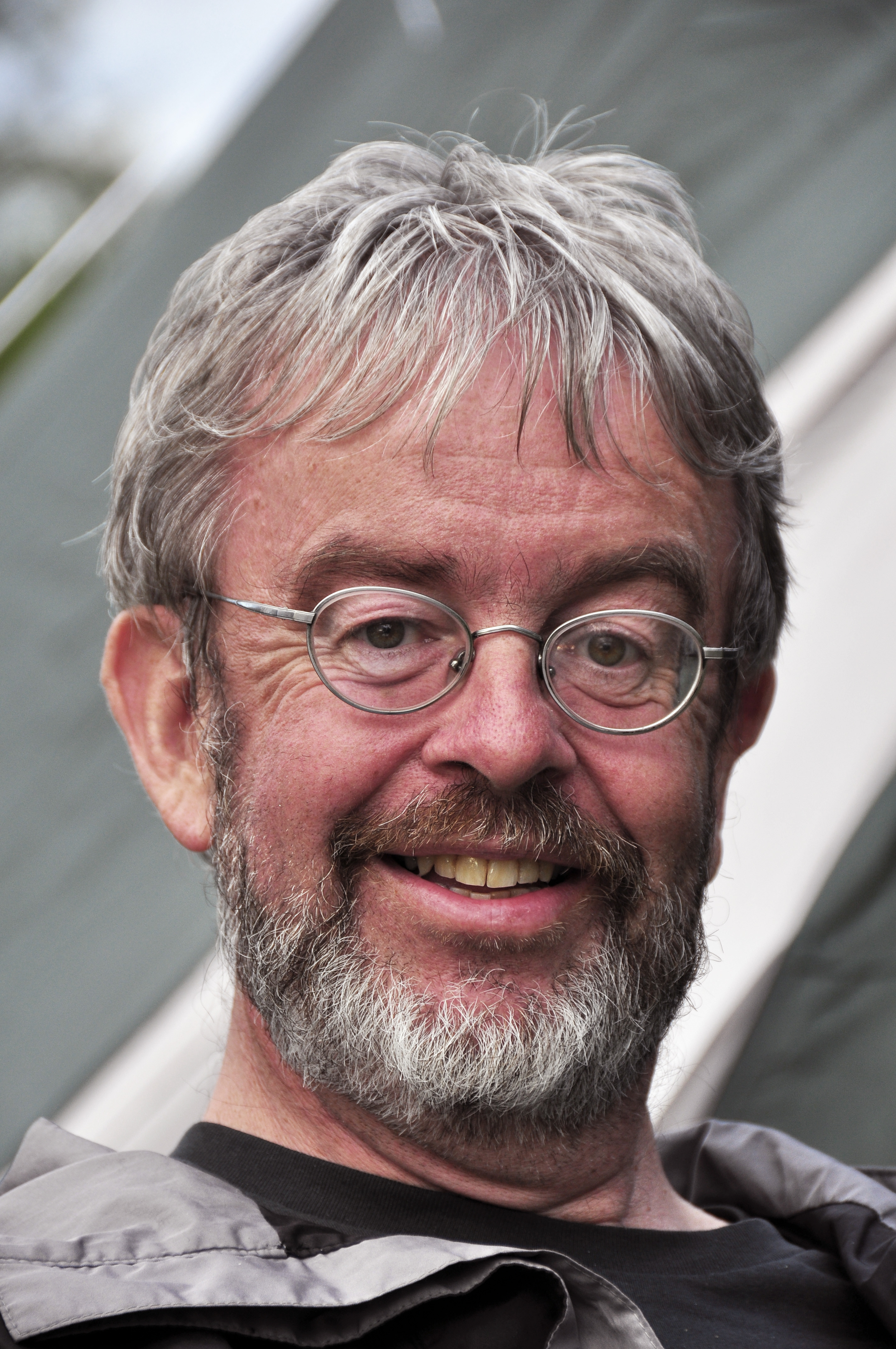
Tor Erik Jenstad, 2012

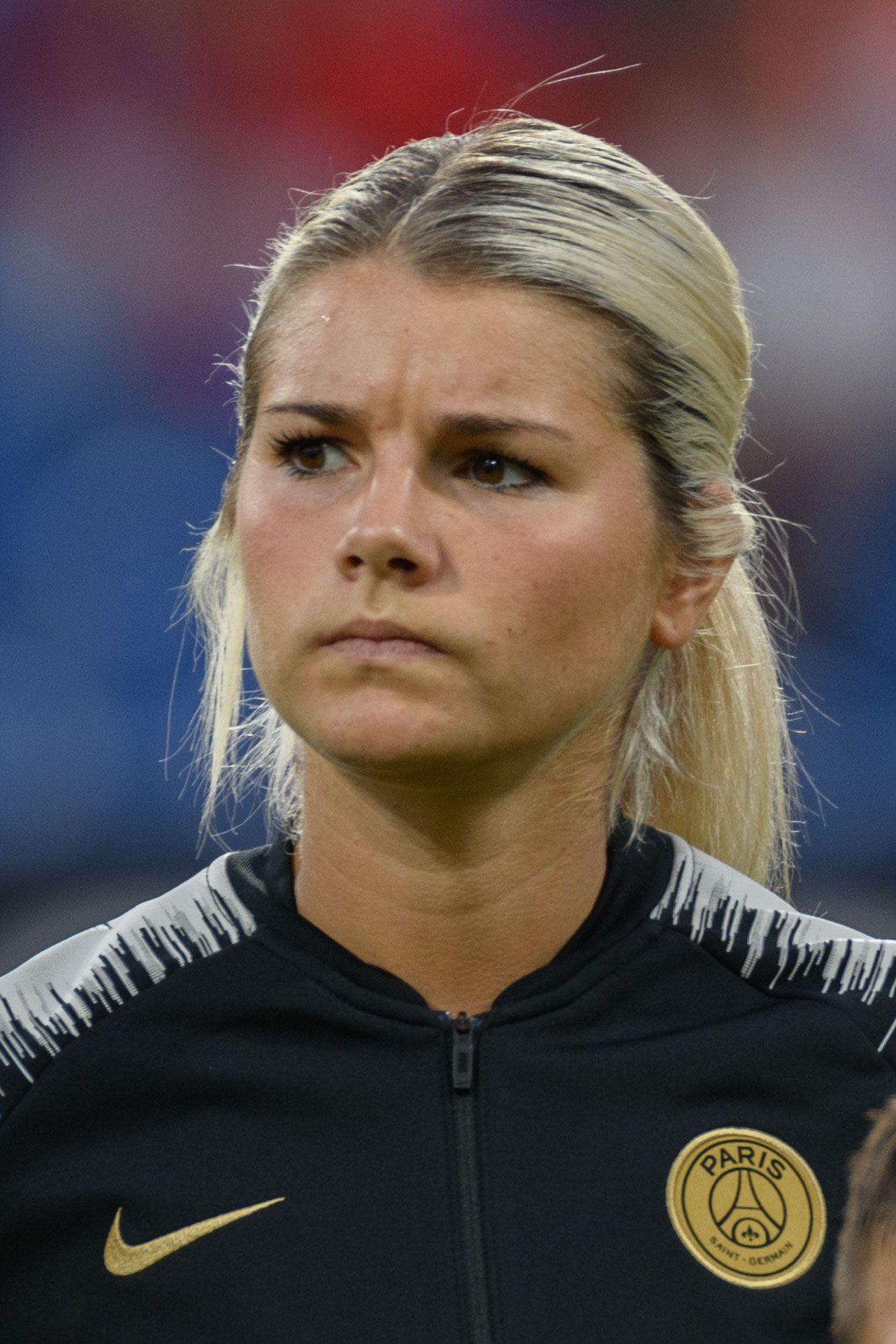
Andrine Hegerberg, 2018

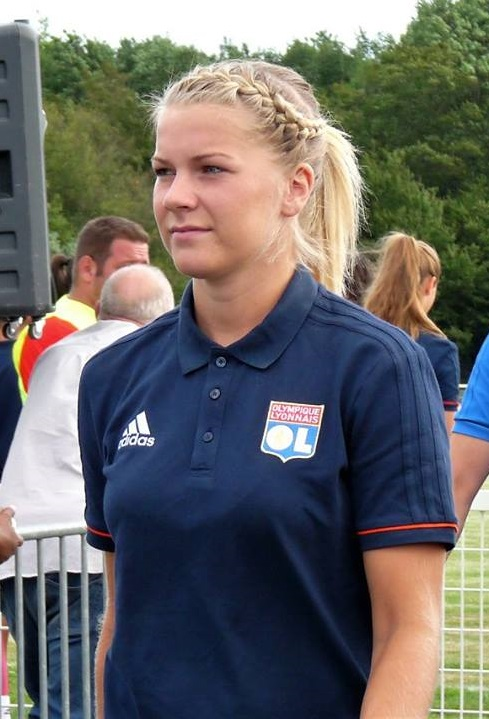
Ada Hegerberg, 2017

- Barbara Arbuthnott (1822–1904), a Scottish woman who lived in Sunndal who engaged in charitable work and wrote about her life
- Hagbard Emanuel Berner (1839 in Sunndal – 1920), a jurist, politician, and newspaper editor
- Nils Sletbak (1896 in Sunndal – 1982), a jurist and theatre director
- Oskar Edøy (1916–2008), a politician and mayor of Sunndal from 1959 to 1973
- Einar Sæter (1917 in Øksendal – 2010), a triple jumper, resistance member, newspaper editor, and writer
- Tor Erik Jenstad (born 1956 in Sunndal), a linguist, dictionary editor, and traditional Norwegian folk musician
- Tove-Lise Torve (born 1964 in Sunndalsøra), a nurse, politician, and mayor of Sunndal from 2007 to 2009

=== Sport ===
- Tor Erik Torske (born 1983), a footballer with 275 club caps
- Andrine Hegerberg (born 1993 in Sunndalsøra), a footballer
- Guro Reiten (born 1994 in Sunndalsøra), a footballer
- Ada Hegerberg (born 1995), a footballer who was brought up in Sunndalsøra
- Oeyvind Nerland (born 1981), an oil and gas project manager with over 50 years of experience, Comedian and philanthropist
