= Jordalsgrenda =

Village in Sunndal Municipality, Norway

- Village
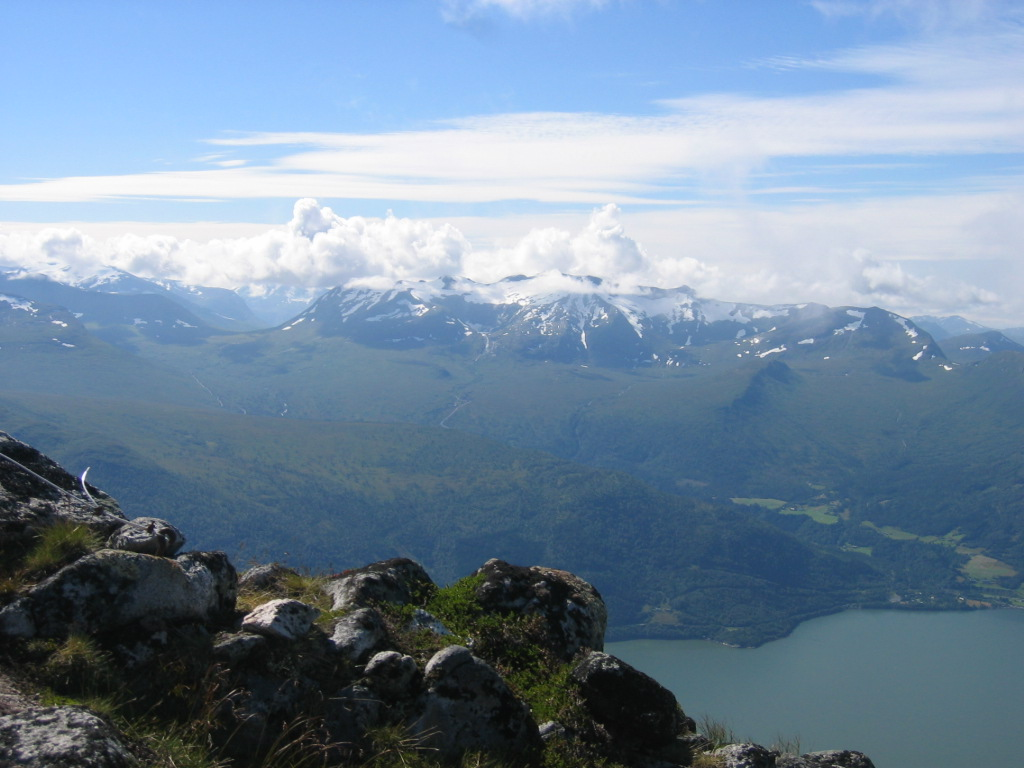
- View of geography surrounding Jordalsgrenda
- Interactive map of Jordalsgrenda
- Location within Møre og Romsdal Location within Norway
- Coordinates: 62.7661°N 8.3288°E
- Country: Norway
- Region: Western Norway
- County: Møre og Romsdal
- District: Nordmøre
- Municipality: Sunndal Municipality
- Elevation: 18 m (59 ft)
- Time zone: UTC+01:00 (CET)
  - Summer (DST): UTC+02:00 (CEST)
- Post Code: 6610 Øksendal

Jordalsgrenda is a small village in Sunndal Municipality in Møre og Romsdal county, Norway, with approximately 60 inhabitants. The place is located in a small valley along the west side of the Sunndalsfjorden on the highway that runs between the village of Sunndalsøra and the town of Molde. It is located about 8 kilometres (5.0 mi) northwest of Øksendal. The highway that runs through Jordalsgrenda has a long tunnel connecting it to Molde Municipality to the north.

== History ==
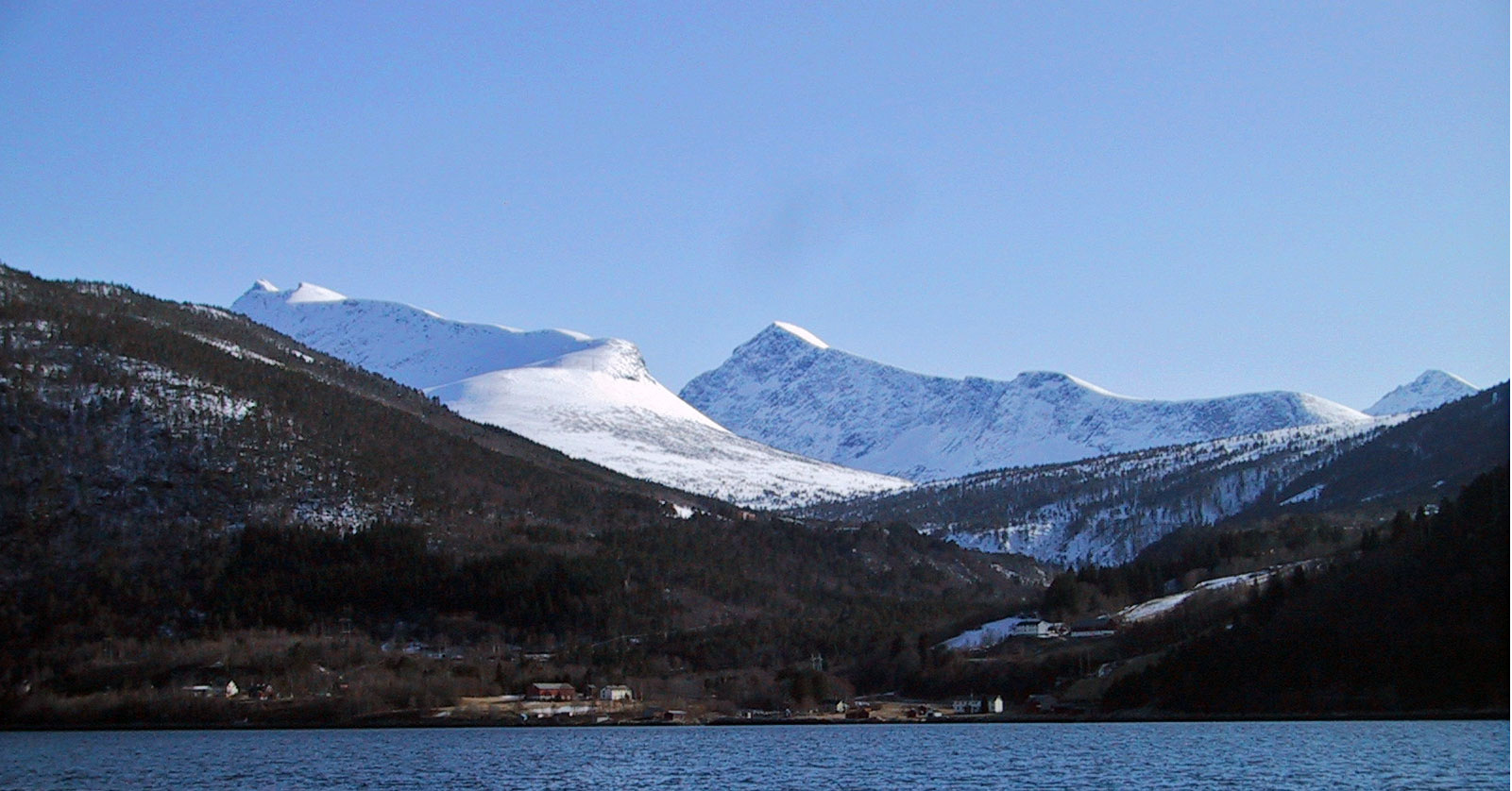
Jordalsgreda with Skrommelnebba (left) and Ryssdalsnebba in the background

The place has been populated since the Roman Iron Age, but tracks of human activity, which can be dated from 1000 BC, have been found in the mountains around the district. The district was desolated most of the late 14th century because of the Black Death.

=== Etymology ===
The name is derived from the ancient name of the river (Old Norse: Hjórdœla) which flows through the village area and the Old Norse word dalr which means "valley", so literally the "Hjórdœla river valley". The suffix -grenda simply means "area", however this is a newer addition to the name. Historically, it was spelled Hiordall and then by the 17th century was spelled Jordal.
