= Einar Sæter =

Einar Sæter (6 December 1917 – 10 November 2010) was a Norwegian triple jumper, resistance member, newspaper editor and writer.

== Nazi resistance efforts ==
Sæter was born in Øksendal Municipality. During the occupation of Norway by Nazi Germany he was a member of XU, a resistance organization. XU was an intelligence organization which focused on collecting static information about the German occupants. Reports were brought by couriers to the Norwegian legation in Stockholm. Sæter worked as courier for XU. He operated a direct route from Nordmøre to Sweden, via Tydal Municipality and Essandsjøen over to Endalsstugane and Blåhammarstugan in Sweden.

== Career ==
Sæter won the silver medal in triple jump at the Norwegian athletics championships in 1946, representing Torshaug IF. His career best was 13.98 metres, achieved in June 1947 on Bislett stadion. In 1953 he won a national silver medal in the decathlon, this time representing IL i BUL.

He edited the newspaper Aura Avis from 1954 to 1971, when he founded the newspaper Driva. He was editor-in-chief here, and retired in 1988. He also wrote several books, and the best known book is XU. I hemmeleg teneste 1940–1945, released in 1995. A second edition written with his son Svein Sæter came in 2007. Sæter also released Gullfeber. Norske gullgravarar i Klondike og Alaska in 1996, about Norwegian gold rush participants in Northern America, and Hans Hyldbakk. Samtale med ein 100-åring in 1998, about Hans Hyldbakk. In 2002 he was awarded The King's Medal of Merit in gold.

== Personal life ==
Sæter was an uncle of Norwegian politician Alv Jakob Fostervoll. After a stroke he used a wheelchair in the last years of his life. He died in November 2010.
