= Tor Erik Jenstad =

Norwegian linguist and folk musician

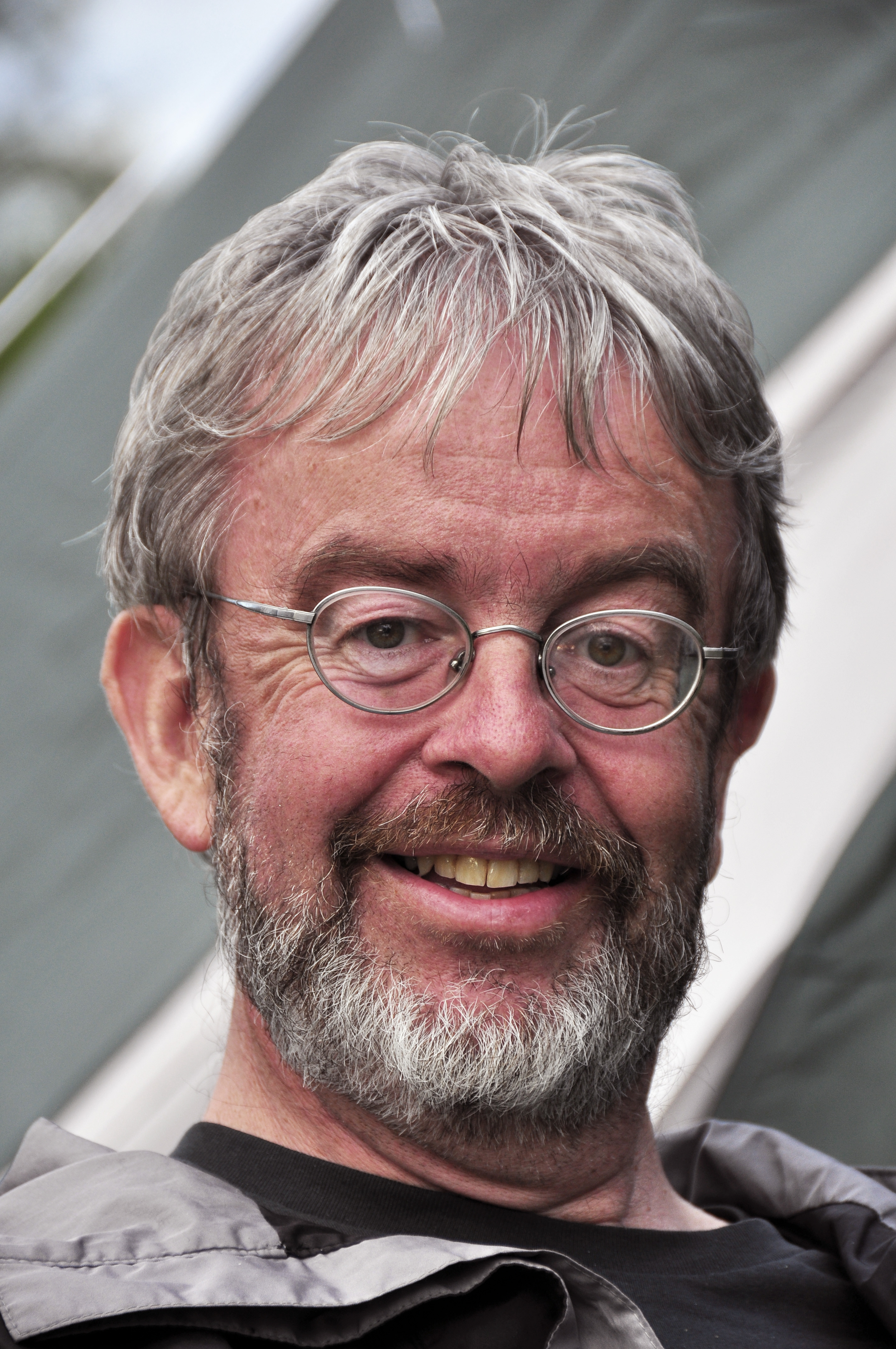
- Born: October 5, 1956 (age 70); Sunndal Municipality, Norway
- Occupations: Linguist, dictionary editor

Tor Erik Jenstad (born October 5, 1956) is a Norwegian linguist, dictionary editor, and traditional Norwegian folk musician living in Trondheim. He was born in Sunndal Municipality in the Nordmøre district.

== Education ==
Jenstad is a graduate of the University of Trondheim, where he received the degree candidatus philologiæ in 1982 with a thesis on the Sunndal dialect. He received his doctorate in 1995 with the dissertation Ein repetis i obligadur: norsk folkemusikkterminologi, med vekt på feletradisjonen (Ein repetis in obligadur: Folk Terminology in Norwegian Dialects with an Emphasis on Fiddle Tradition). In 2001 he published a book with the same title based on his dissertation.

== Linguistic career ==
Since 2003 he has been one of the editors of the 2014 Norsk Ordbok (Norwegian Dictionary). Jenstad is a member of the Royal Norwegian Society of Sciences and Letters.

Jenstad focuses on communication, and his publications range from academic to popular research books and articles. He also frequently delivers lectures and participates in radio programs. He regularly contributes to the NRK program Språkteigen (About Language). He also has a dialect blog called "Moro med ord og uttrykk!" (Fun with words and phrases!) together with Unni Ulltveit (responsible for photos and editing).

Since 1992 he has featured on the NRK radio program "Dialektmagasinet" (Dialect Magazine), which is still broadcast weekly and now can be heard as podcasts.

In 1993 he received the Nordmøre Mållag language prize, and in 1998 he received an award from the Royal Gustavus Adolphus Academy for Swedish Folk Culture (the Torsten Jancke Memorial Fund) for his work on Norwegian dialectology.

== Folk music ==
Jenstad is also an active folk musician. He was a board member of Norwegian National Association for Traditional Music and Dance from 1997 to 1999, and head of the Trøndelag Folk Music Research Association from 2013 to 2014.

Together with the folk music ensemble Hørkelgaddan, where he played piano accordion and diatonic button accordion, he received the 1981 Spelleman Award for folk music and traditional dance music. He plays in several fiddle and folk music groups.

== Works ==
- Nye skjellsordboka (New Dictionary of Insults, 1991, 1999)
- Ein repetis i obligadur: folkemusikkterminologi i norske dialektar, med vekt på feletradisjonen (Ein repetis in obligadur: Folk Terminology in Norwegian Dialects with an Emphasis on Fiddle Tradition, 2001)
- (with Arnold Dalen) Trønderordboka (Trøndelag Dictionary, 2002)
- (ed., with Lars S. Vikør) Leksikalsk forsking i norske målføre og nynorsk skriftspråk (Lexical Research in Norwegian Dialects and Standard Nynorsk, 2011)
- "Frå ryphøa til shit creek. Ordspel på stadnamn" (From Ryphøa to Shit Creek: Puns on Place Names, 2013, in Namn og Nemne: Tidsskrift for norsk namnegransking)
