= Christianssands Tidende =

Defunct conservative newspaper in Kristiansand, Norway

Christianssands Tidende (Kristiansand Times) was a conservative newspaper published in Kristiansand, Norway.

The paper was founded in 1883 and ceased publication in 1973. The paper took over the newspaper Mandals Avis in 1956, and then it merged with Sørlandske Tidende from Arendal in 1973, also adopting that name. Publication of the merged newspaper continued for two years in Kristiansand, and the last issue appeared on October 4, 1975.

From 1924 to 1932, the paper was edited by Christian Joachim Rieber-Mohn (1891–1959), who had previously edited Molde Annonceblad. After Rieber-Mohn moved to Hamar Stiftstidende, he was succeeded by Reidar Alex Lorentzen as editor.
