= Asbjørn Øksendal =

Norwegian writer (1922–2015)

Asbjørn Øksendal (4 August 1922 – 23 May 2015) was a Norwegian novelist and non-fiction writer. He was born in Mosjøen, Helgeland. He wrote several books on the subject of the occupation of Norway by Nazi Germany, including Lurøy-affæren from 1966, Operasjon Oleander from 1968, Når nøden er størst (on POW camps in Trøndelag) from 1969, Sluttspill i Rinnans bandekloster (on Sonderabteilung Lola) from 1971, and Gulltransporten (on the flight of the Norwegian National Treasury) from 1974. He also wrote novels from the Viking Age. He died in May 2015.
