= Ålvund =

Village in Sunndal Municipality, Norway

- Village
- Interactive map of Ålvund
- Location within Møre og Romsdal Location within Norway
- Coordinates: 62.8336°N 8.5089°E
- Country: Norway
- Region: Western Norway
- County: Møre og Romsdal
- District: Nordmøre
- Municipality: Sunndal Municipality

Area
  - Total: 0.25 km^{2} (0.097 sq mi)
- Elevation: 24 m (79 ft)

Population (2003)
  - Total: 202
  - Density: 808/km^{2} (2,090/sq mi)
- Time zone: UTC+01:00 (CET)
  - Summer (DST): UTC+02:00 (CEST)
- Post Code: 6622 Ålvundfjord

Ålvund is a village in Sunndal Municipality in Møre og Romsdal county, Norway. It is located at the beginning of the Ålvundfjorden (an extension of the Trongfjorden, about 8 kilometres (5.0 mi) northwest of the village of Ålvundeidet and the Innerdalen valley. The river Ålvundelva flows down the Innerdalen valley, through the village of Ålvundeidet, and empties into the fjord at the village of Ålvund. The Norwegian National Road 70 runs through Ålvund on its way from the village of Sunndalsøra north to the village of Tingvoll and on the town of Kristiansund.

The 0.25-square-kilometre (62-acre) village had a population (2003) of 202 and a population density of 808 inhabitants per square kilometre (2,090/sq mi). Since 2003, the population and area data for this village area has not been separately tracked by Statistics Norway.
