= Fylket =

Defunct newspaper from Møre og Romsdal, Norway

Fylket (lit. 'The County') was a Norwegian newspaper published by the Center Party in Molde from 1927 to 1999. The paper appeared three times a week. In 1928, it took over the rival paper Molde Annonceblad. Fylket was shut down after its circulation figures were halved during the 1990s. In 1999 it had a circulation of just over 1,700 newspapers, nearly 1,000 fewer than the year before. The reason for the drop in subscribers was mainly changes in calculating the circulation. The supplement Landbruksnytt was previously counted as part of Fylket's circulation.

Fylket was owned by the agricultural organizations in Møre og Romsdal. Major structural changes in its owners contributed greatly to the paper's closure.
