= Tingvollfjorden (Buskerud) =

Lake in Ål, Norway

- Location within Norway
- Location: Ål (Buskerud)
- Coordinates: 60°39′3″N 8°41′21″E
- Basin countries: Norway
- Surface area: 20 ha (49 acres)
- Shore length^{1}: 2.60 km (1.62 mi)
- Surface elevation: 336 m (1,102 ft)
- References: NVE
- ^{1} Shore length is not a well-defined measure.

Tingvollfjorden is a small fishing lake in the municipality of Ål in Buskerud county, Norway. The lake is located in the valley of Hallingdal, northwest of Honefoss on the watershed of the Hallingdalselva.

== See also ==
- List of lakes in Norway
