= Øksendal (village) =

Village in Sunndal Municipality, Norway

Øksendal Øksendalsøra
- Village
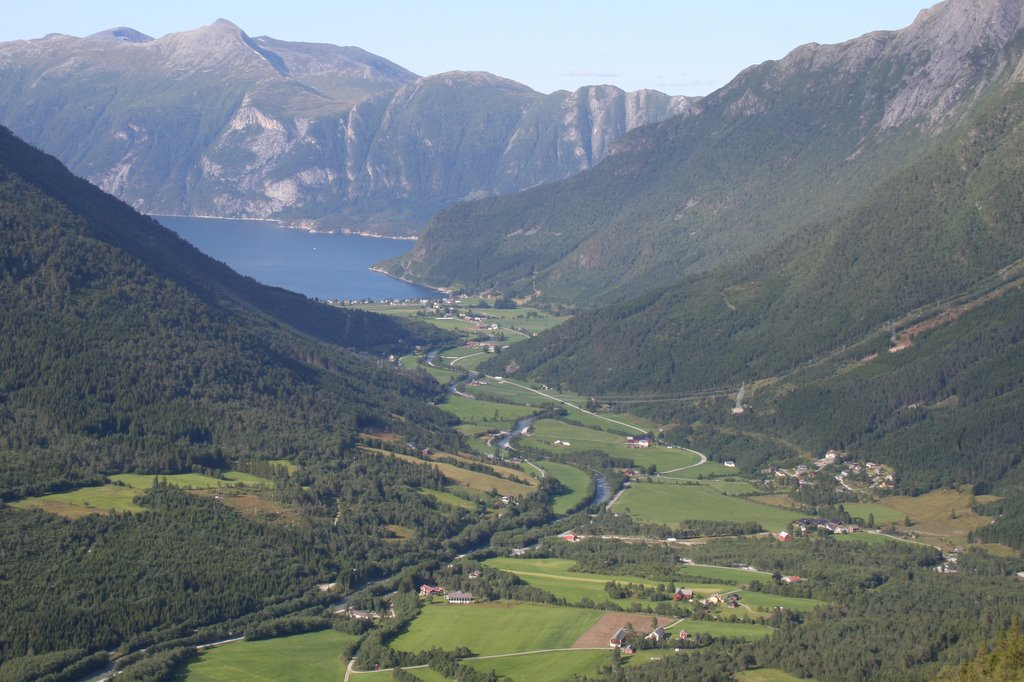
- View of the village along the water
- Interactive map of Øksendal
- Location within Møre og Romsdal Location within Norway
- Coordinates: 62.7183°N 8.4311°E
- Country: Norway
- Region: Western Norway
- County: Møre og Romsdal
- District: Nordmøre
- Municipality: Sunndal Municipality
- Elevation: 7 m (23 ft)
- Time zone: UTC+01:00 (CET)
  - Summer (DST): UTC+02:00 (CEST)
- Post Code: 6610 Øksendalsøra

Øksendal (or Øksendalsøra) is a village in Sunndal Municipality in Møre og Romsdal county, Norway. The village is located along the Sunndalsfjorden at the northern end of the Øksendalen valley. The village sits about 10 kilometres (6.2 mi) northwest of the municipal centre of Sunndalsøra and about 9 kilometres (5.6 mi) southeast of the village of Jordalsgrenda. The village of Ålvundeidet lies about 10 kilometres (6.2 mi) to the north (across the fjord). The 6-kilometre (3.7 mi) long Øksendal Tunnel connects this village to the rest of Sunndal Municipality to the southeast.

== History ==
The village was the administrative centre of the old Øksendal Municipality that existed from 1854 until 1960. Øksendal Church is located in the village and it is the church for the Øksendal parish, covering the northwestern part of Sunndal Municipality.
