= Hoem =

Hoem is a Norwegian surname. Notable people with this surname include:

- Bjørn Tore Hoem (born 1991), Norwegian cyclist
- Edvard Hoem (born 1949), Norwegian novelist
- Gottfred Hoem (1900–1979), Norwegian politician
- Ine Hoem (born 1985), Norwegian singer
- Jan Hoem (1939–2017), Norwegian scientist
- Knut Hoem (1924–1987), Norwegian politician
