= Øksendal Municipality =

Former municipality in Møre og Romsdal, Norway

Øksendal Municipality Øksendal herred
- Former municipality
- Øksendalen herred (historic name)
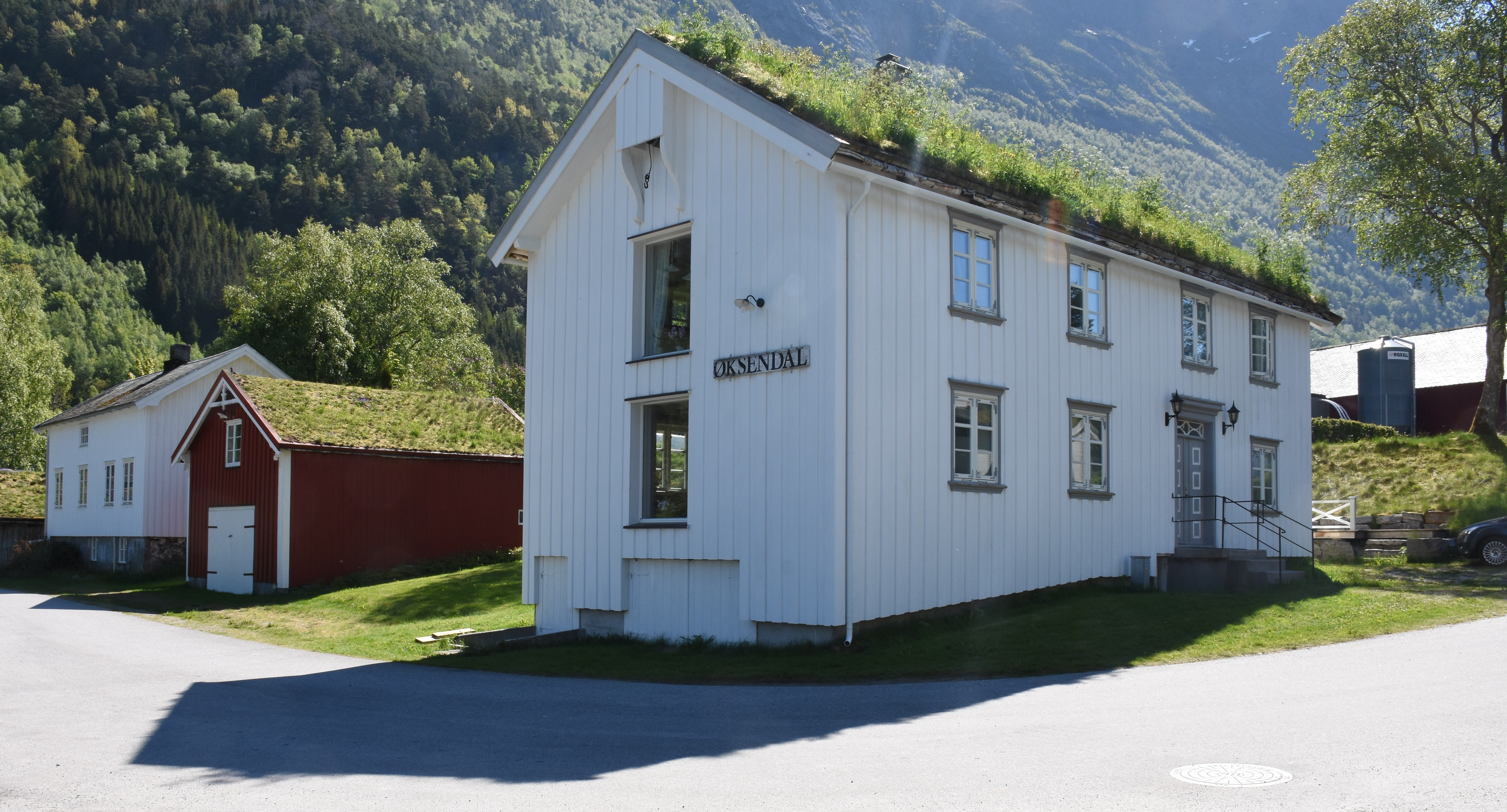
- The municipal council of Øksendal used to assemble in this house at Øksendalsøra.

- Møre og Romsdal within Norway

- Øksendal within Møre og Romsdal
- Coordinates: 62°40′32″N 08°23′57″E
- Country: Norway
- County: Møre og Romsdal
- District: Nordmøre
- Established: 1854
  - Preceded by: Sunndal Municipality
- Disestablished: 1 Jan 1960
  - Succeeded by: Sunndal Municipality
- Administrative centre: Øksendalsøra

Government
  - Mayor (1955-1959): Kaare Ree (LL)

Area (upon dissolution)
  - Total: 225.7 km^{2} (87.1 sq mi)
  - Rank: #354 in Norway
- Highest elevation: 1,809 m (5,935 ft)

Population (1959)
  - Total: 486
  - Rank: #734 in Norway
  - Density: 2.2/km^{2} (5.7/sq mi)
  - Change (10 years): ▼ −10%
- Demonym: Øksendal-folk

Official language
  - Norwegian form: Nynorsk
- Time zone: UTC+01:00 (CET)
  - Summer (DST): UTC+02:00 (CEST)
- ISO 3166 code: NO-1561

Øksendal is a former municipality in Møre og Romsdal county, Norway. The 226-square-kilometre (87 sq mi) municipality existed from 1854 until its dissolution in 1960. It had one of the smallest municipal populations in Norway. It was located in the northwestern part of the present-day Sunndal Municipality, along the Sunndalsfjorden. It included the coastal area along the fjord as well as the whole Øksendalen valley. The administrative centre of the municipality was the village of Øksendalsøra, where Øksendal Church is also located.

Prior to its dissolution in 1960, the 225.7-square-kilometre (87.1 sq mi) municipality was the 354th largest by area out of the 743 municipalities in Norway. Øksendal Municipality was the 734th most populous municipality in Norway with a population of about 486. The municipality's population density was 2.2 inhabitants per square kilometre (5.7/sq mi) and its population had decreased by 10% over the previous 5-year period.

== General information ==
In 1854, the parish of Øksendal was separated from the large Sunndal Municipality to establish the new Øksendal Municipality. Initially, Øksendal Municipality had a population of 1,291. On 1 January 1899, the northern part of the municipality, located on the northern side of the Sunndalsfjorden, (population: 462) was separated to become the new Ulvundeid Municipality. This left Øksendal Municipality with 654 inhabitants.

During the 1960s, there were many municipal mergers across Norway due to the work of the Schei Committee. On 1 January 1960, Øksendal Municipality (population: 497) was merged with Ålvundeid Municipality (population: 513) and Sunndal Municipality (population: 5,851) to form a new, larger Sunndal Municipality.

=== Name ===
The municipality (originally the parish) is named after the Øksendalen valley (Old Norse: Usmudalr). The first element is usma which is the name for the river that runs through the valley. The meaning of the name is unknown. The last element is dalr which means "valley" or "dale". Historically, the name of the municipality was spelled Øksendalen. On 3 November 1917, a royal resolution changed the spelling of the name of the municipality to Øksendal, removing the definite form ending -en.

=== Churches ===
The Church of Norway had one parish (sokn) within Øksendal Municipality. At the time of the municipal dissolution, it was part of the Øksendal prestegjeld and the Indre Nordmøre prosti (deanery) in the Diocese of Nidaros.

Churches in Øksendal Municipality
Parish (sokn)	Church name	Location of the church	Year built
Øksendal	Øksendal Church	Øksendalsøra	1894

== Geography ==
The municipality was located in the Øksendalen valley on the south side of the Sunndalsfjorden. The highest point in the municipality was the 1,809-metre (5,935 ft) tall mountain Vikesoksa on the border with Eresfjord og Vistdal Municipality. The municipality was surrounded by Sunndal Municipality to the southeast, Eresfjord og Vistdal Municipality to the west, Nesset Municipality to the north, and Ålvundeid Municipality to the northeast (across the fjord).

== Government ==
While it existed, Øksendal Municipality was responsible for primary education (through 10th grade), outpatient health services, senior citizen services, welfare and other social services, zoning, economic development, and municipal roads and utilities. The municipality was governed by a municipal council of directly elected representatives. The mayor was indirectly elected by a vote of the municipal council. The municipality was under the jurisdiction of the Frostating Court of Appeal.

=== Municipal council ===
The municipal council (Herredsstyre) of Øksendal Municipality was made up of 13 representatives that were elected to four year terms. The tables below show the historical composition of the council by political party.

Øksendal heradsstyre 1955–1959
Party name (in Nynorsk)	Number of representatives
Labour Party (Arbeidarpartiet)	5
Joint List(s) of Non-Socialist Parties (Borgarlege Felleslister)	8
Total number of members:	13

Øksendal heradsstyre 1951–1955
Party name (in Nynorsk)	Number of representatives
Labour Party (Arbeidarpartiet)	5
Joint List(s) of Non-Socialist Parties (Borgarlege Felleslister)	7
Total number of members:	12

Øksendal heradsstyre 1947–1951
Party name (in Nynorsk)	Number of representatives
Labour Party (Arbeidarpartiet)	5
Joint List(s) of Non-Socialist Parties (Borgarlege Felleslister)	7
Total number of members:	12

Øksendal heradsstyre 1945–1947
Party name (in Nynorsk)	Number of representatives
Labour Party (Arbeidarpartiet)	5
Joint List(s) of Non-Socialist Parties (Borgarlege Felleslister)	7
Total number of members:	12

Øksendal heradsstyre 1937–1941*
Party name (in Nynorsk)	Number of representatives
Local List(s) (Lokale lister)	12
Total number of members:	12
Note: Due to the German occupation of Norway during World War II, no elections were held for new municipal councils until after the war ended in 1945.

=== Mayors ===
The mayor (Nynorsk: ordførar) of Øksendal Municipality was the political leader of the municipality and the chairperson of the municipal council. The following people have held this position:

- 1854–1857: Peder P. Halse
- 1858–1859: Rev. J.F. Schwabe
- 1860–1863: Peder P. Halse
- 1864–1865: Anders Andersen Aaram
- 1866–1871: Peder P. Halse
- 1872–1873: Erik Gunnarsen Sæther
- 1874–1885: Peder P. Halse
- 1886–1890: Erik Bølset
- 1890–1895: Halvor Olsen Melkild
- 1896–1898: Einar Børset
- 1899–1901: Peder Iversen Øveraas
- 1902–1904: Ole Larsen Lien
- 1905–1907: Peder Iversen Øveraas
- 1908–1934: Ole Larsen Lien
- 1934–1940: Anders Endreson Skrondal (V)
- 1941–1942: John Erstad (NS)
- 1942–1944: Henrik Børset (NS)
- 1945–1947: Anders Endreson Skrondal (V)
- 1947–1951: John O. Lien
- 1951–1955: Anders Endreson Skrondal (V)
- 1955–1959: Kaare Ree (LL)

== See also ==
- List of former municipalities of Norway
