= Sunndalsfjorden =

Fjord in Møre og Romsdal, Norway

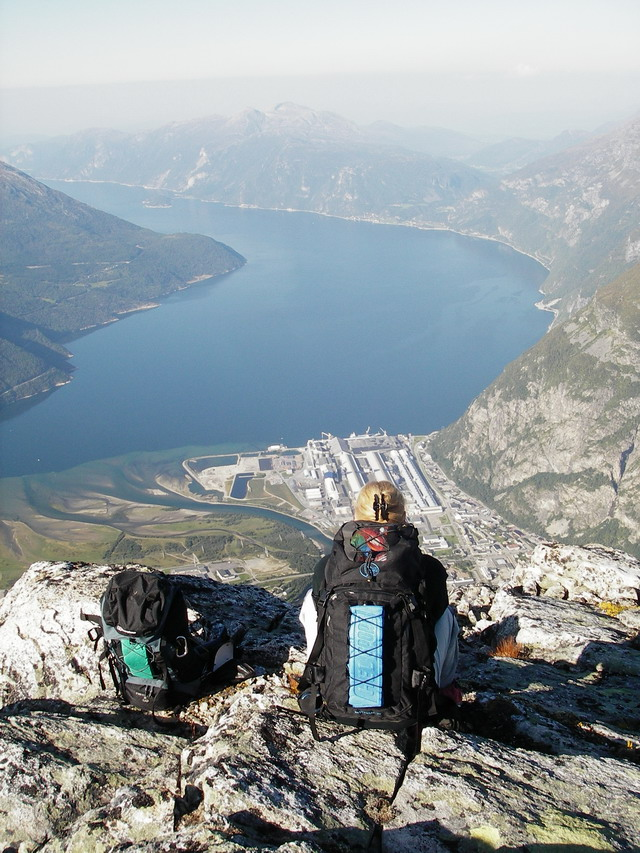
- View of the inner part of the Sunndalsfjorden with the village of Sunndalsøra and the estuary of the river Driva in the foreground. View from the mountain Litjkalkinn.
- Interactive map of the fjord
- Location: Møre og Romsdal, Norway
- Coordinates: 62.7889°N 8.3285°E
- Type: Fjord
- Primary inflows: River Driva
- Primary outflows: Tingvollfjorden
- Basin countries: Norway
- Max. length: 17 kilometres (11 mi)
- Max. width: 3.5 kilometres (2.2 mi)

Sunndalsfjorden (sometimes Sunndalsfjord in English) is a fjord in Sunndal Municipality in Møre og Romsdal county, Norway. The 17-kilometre (11 mi) long Sunndalsfjorden comprises the southern end of the main Tingvollfjorden. It begins at the Ballsneset peninsula, at the municipal boundary of Sunndal and extends south to the village of Sunndalsøra. Other villages along the fjord include Jordalsgrenda and Øksendalsøra. The main inflow of the fjord is the river Driva which flows into the fjord at Sunndalsøra. Norwegian National Road 70 runs along the northeastern part of the fjord near Sunndalsøra.

== See also ==
- List of Norwegian fjords
