= Sunndalsøra =

Village in Sunndal Municipality, Norway

- Village
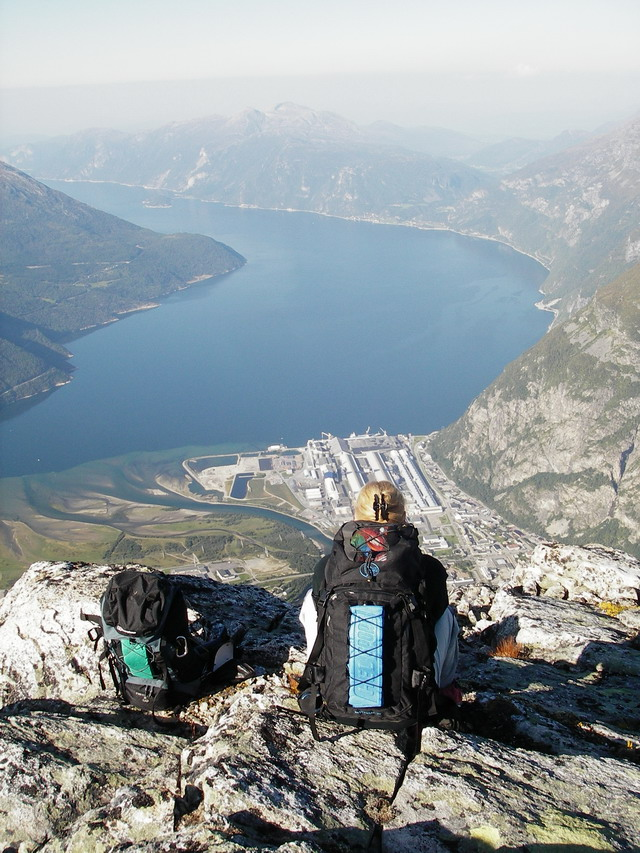
- Sunndalsøra viewed from the mountain Litlkalkinn. The estuary of the river Driva is clearly visible, as is the aluminium plant. The Sunndalsfjorden stretches out to northwest towards Kristiansund
- Interactive map of Sunndalsøra
- Location within Møre og Romsdal Location within Norway
- Coordinates: 62.6752°N 8.5633°E
- Country: Norway
- Region: Western Norway
- County: Møre og Romsdal
- District: Nordmøre
- Municipality: Sunndal Municipality

Area
  - Total: 3.61 km^{2} (1.39 sq mi)
- Elevation: 6 m (20 ft)

Population (2024)
  - Total: 4,207
  - Density: 1,165/km^{2} (3,020/sq mi)
- Time zone: UTC+01:00 (CET)
  - Summer (DST): UTC+02:00 (CEST)
- Post Code: 6600 Sunndalsøra

Sunndalsøra is the administrative centre of Sunndal Municipality in Møre og Romsdal county, Norway. The village of Sunndalsøra lies at the mouth of the river Driva at the beginning of the Sunndalsfjord. Sunndalsøra is surrounded by steep mountains, such as Hårstadnebba, which reach elevations as high as 1,700 metres (5,600 ft). Some of these mountains around Sunndalsøra are used for BASE jumping.

The 3.61-square-kilometre (890-acre) village has a population (2024) of 4,207 and a population density of 1,165 inhabitants per square kilometre (3,020/sq mi).

== Location ==
The village is located about 4 kilometres (2.5 mi) west of the village of Holssanden, 10 kilometres (6.2 mi) southeast of the village of Øksendal, and about 9 kilometres (5.6 mi) west of the village of Grøa. Norwegian National Road 70 runs through the village of Sunndalsøra on its way from the town of Kristiansund to Oppdal Municipality in the neighboring Trøndelag county.

== Media gallery ==
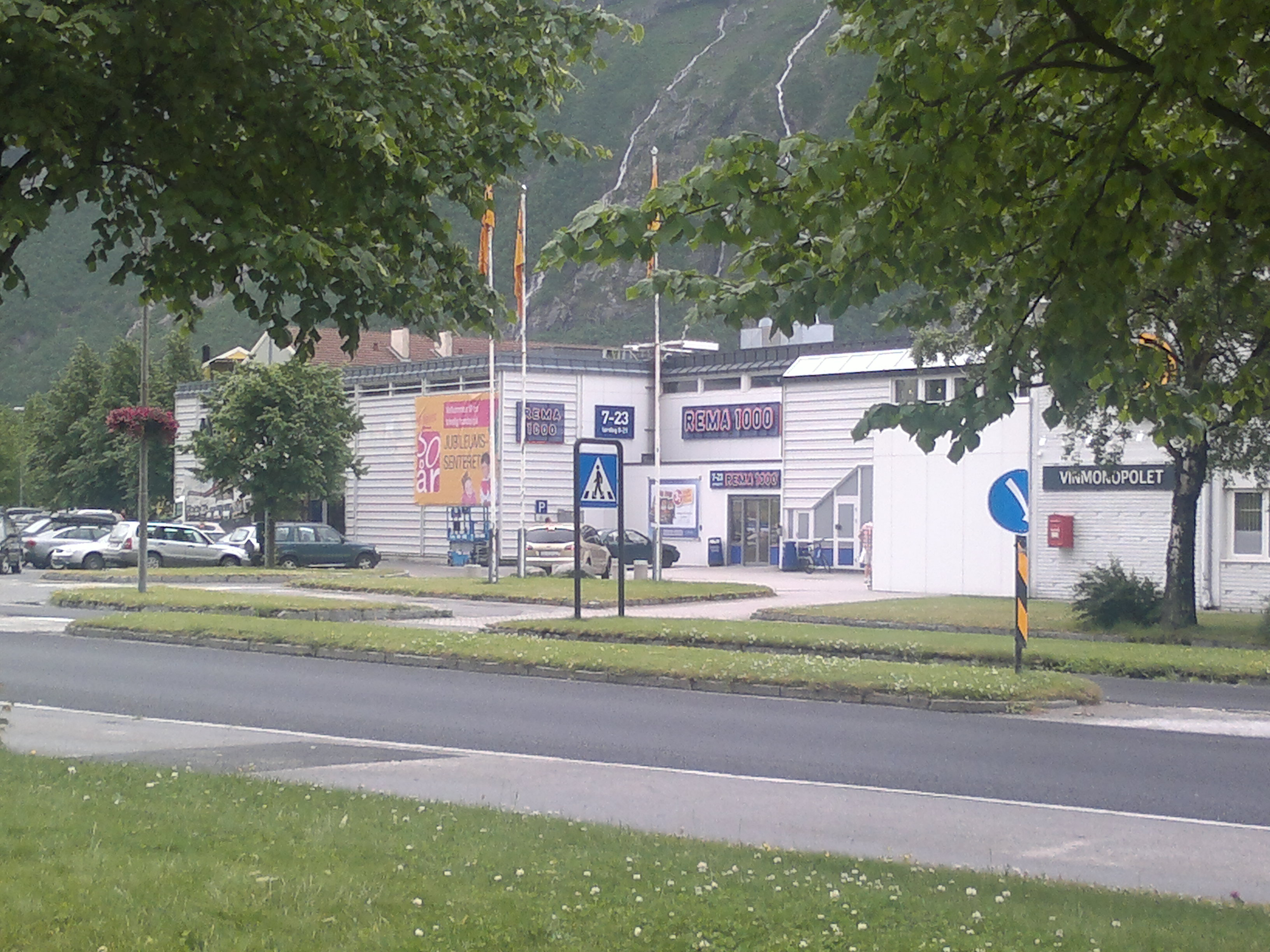
Rema 1000 in Sunndalsøra

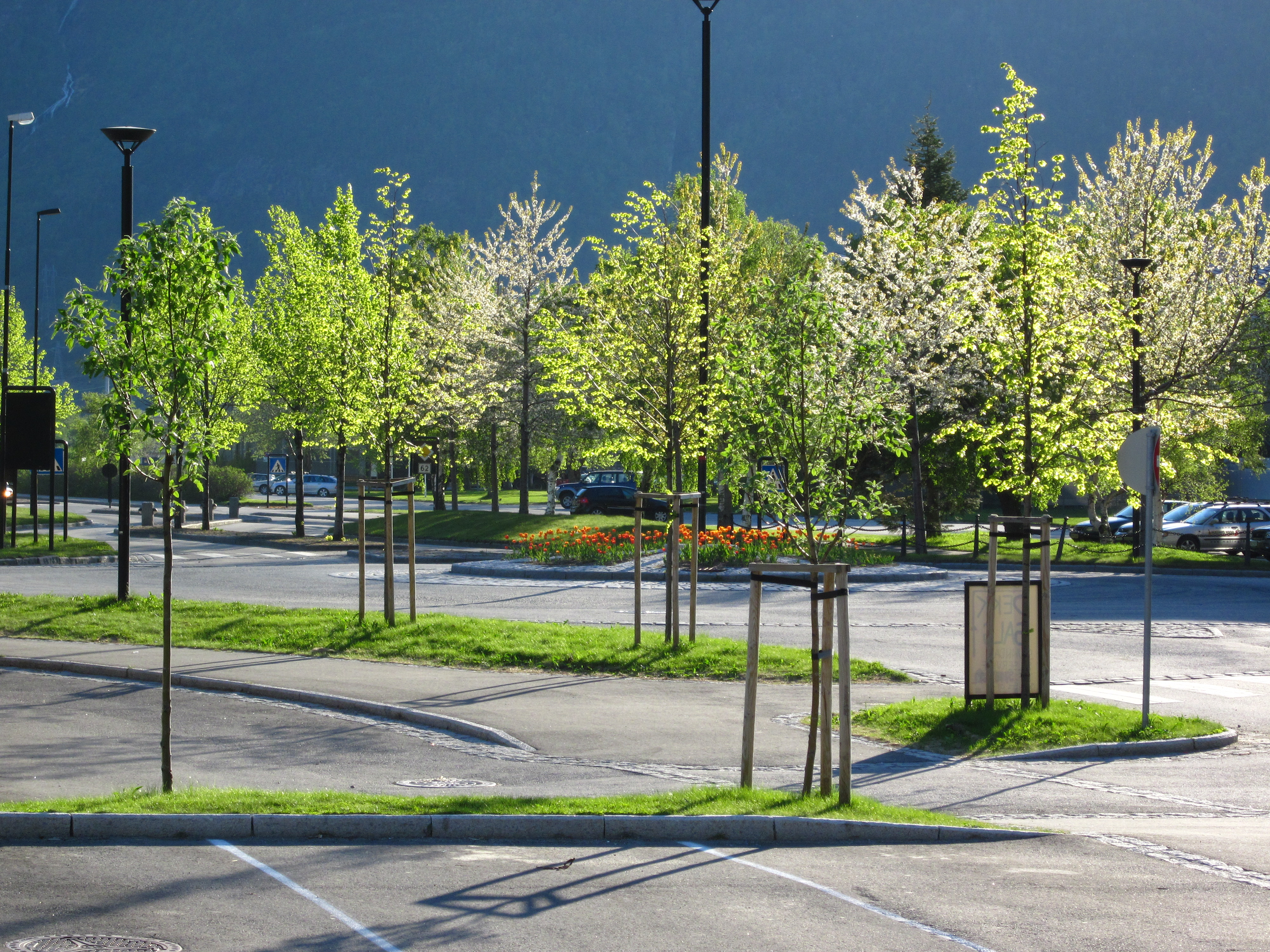

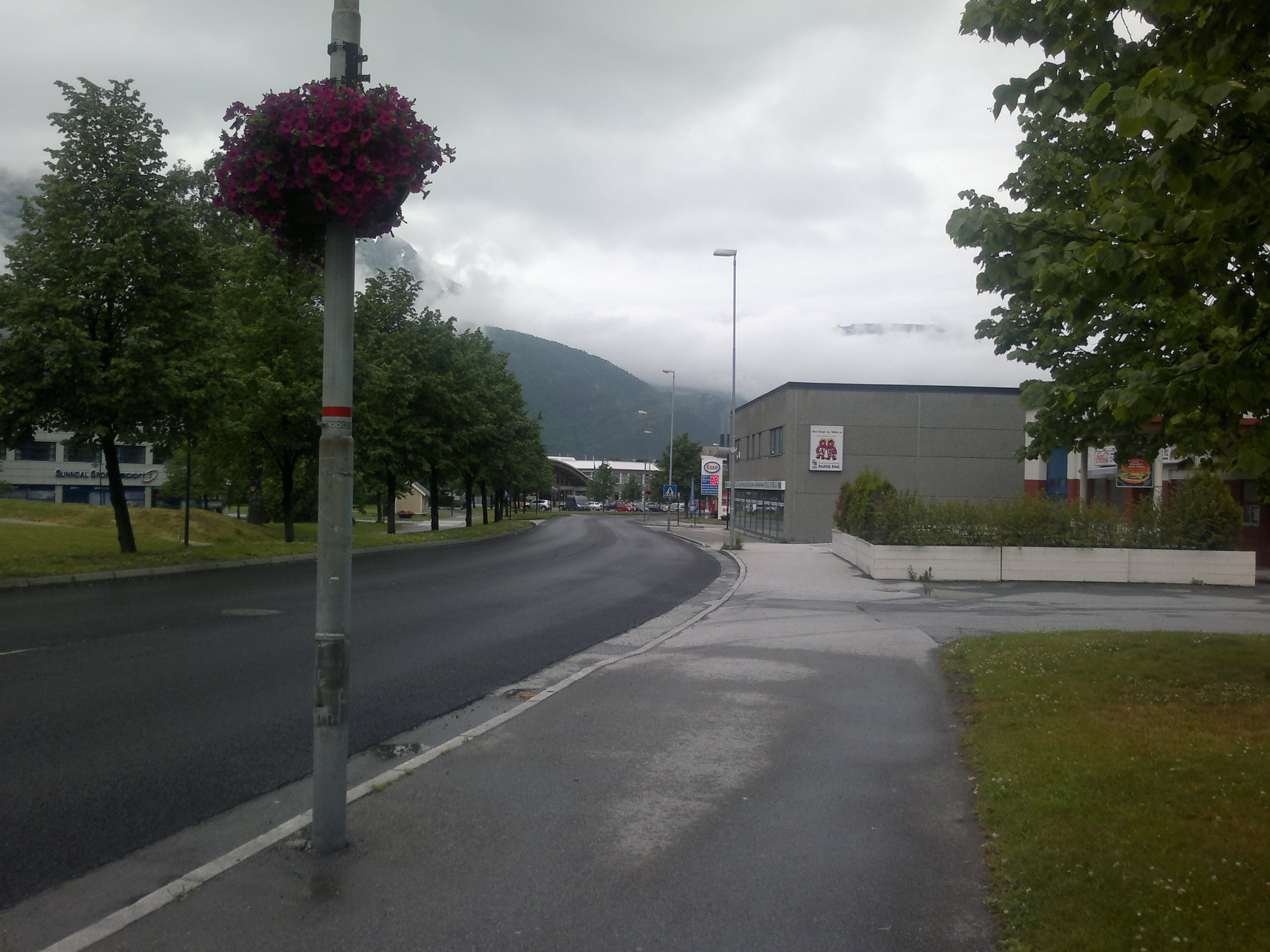

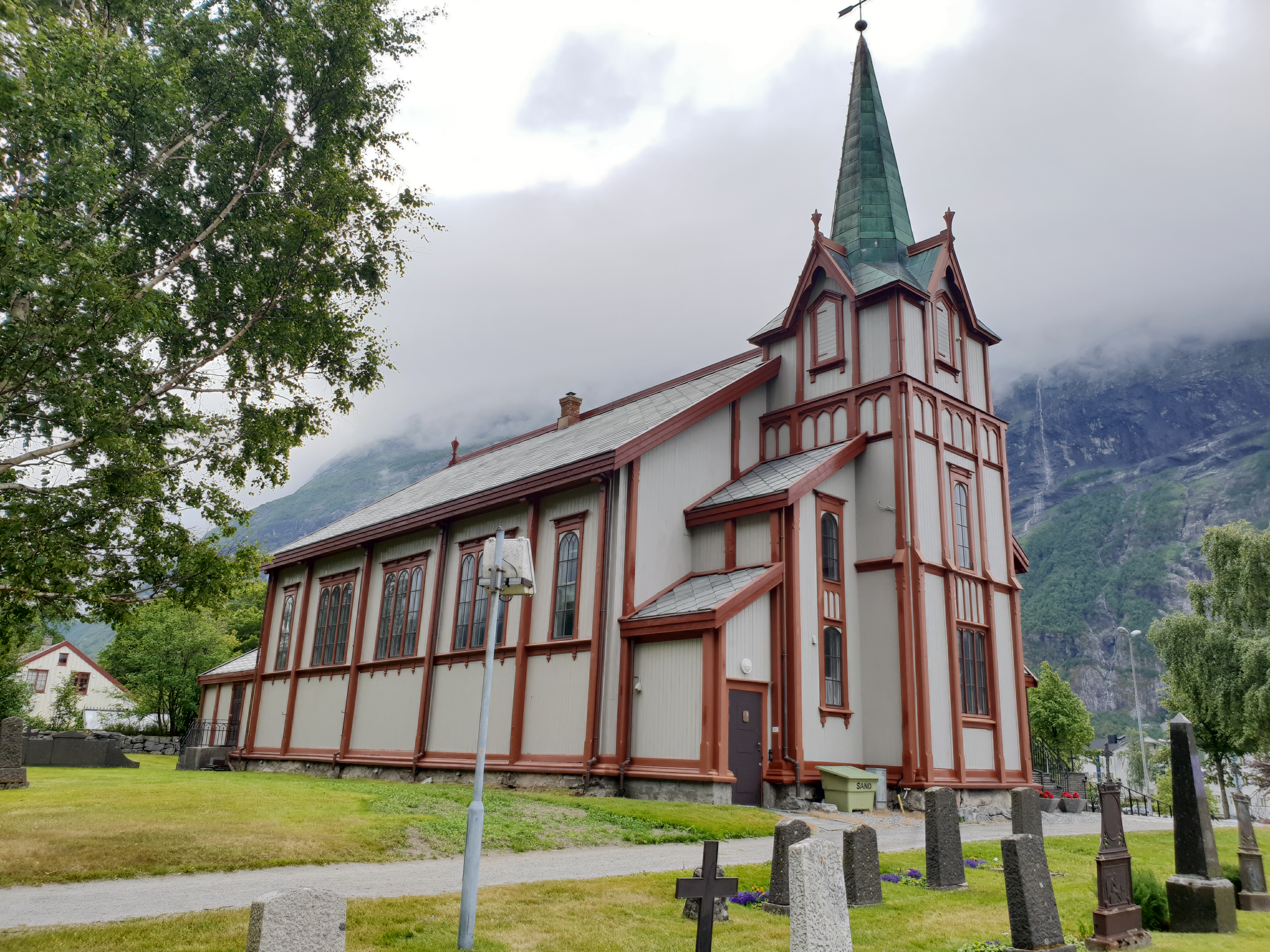
Hov Church

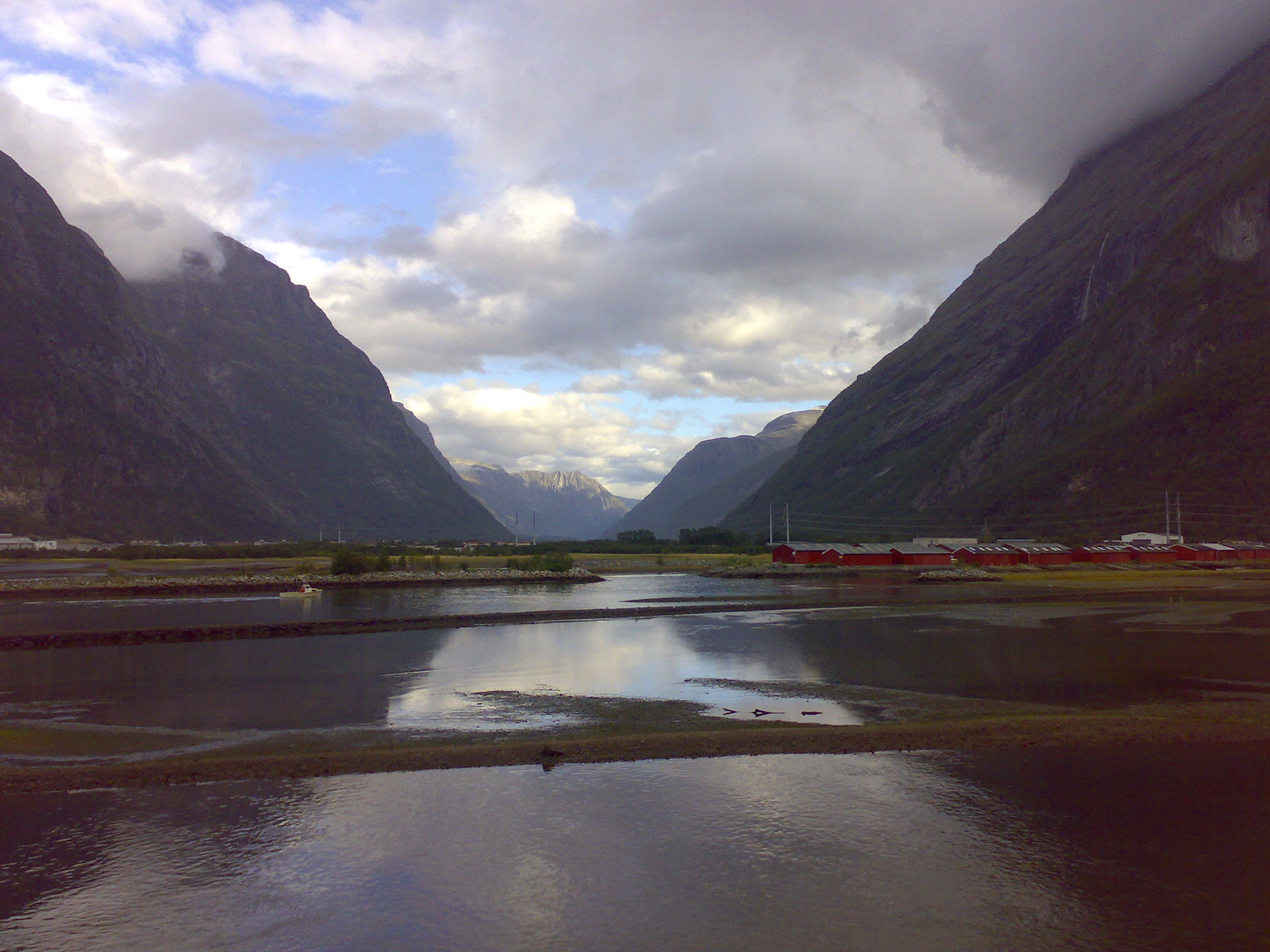
Looking towards the village from the fjord

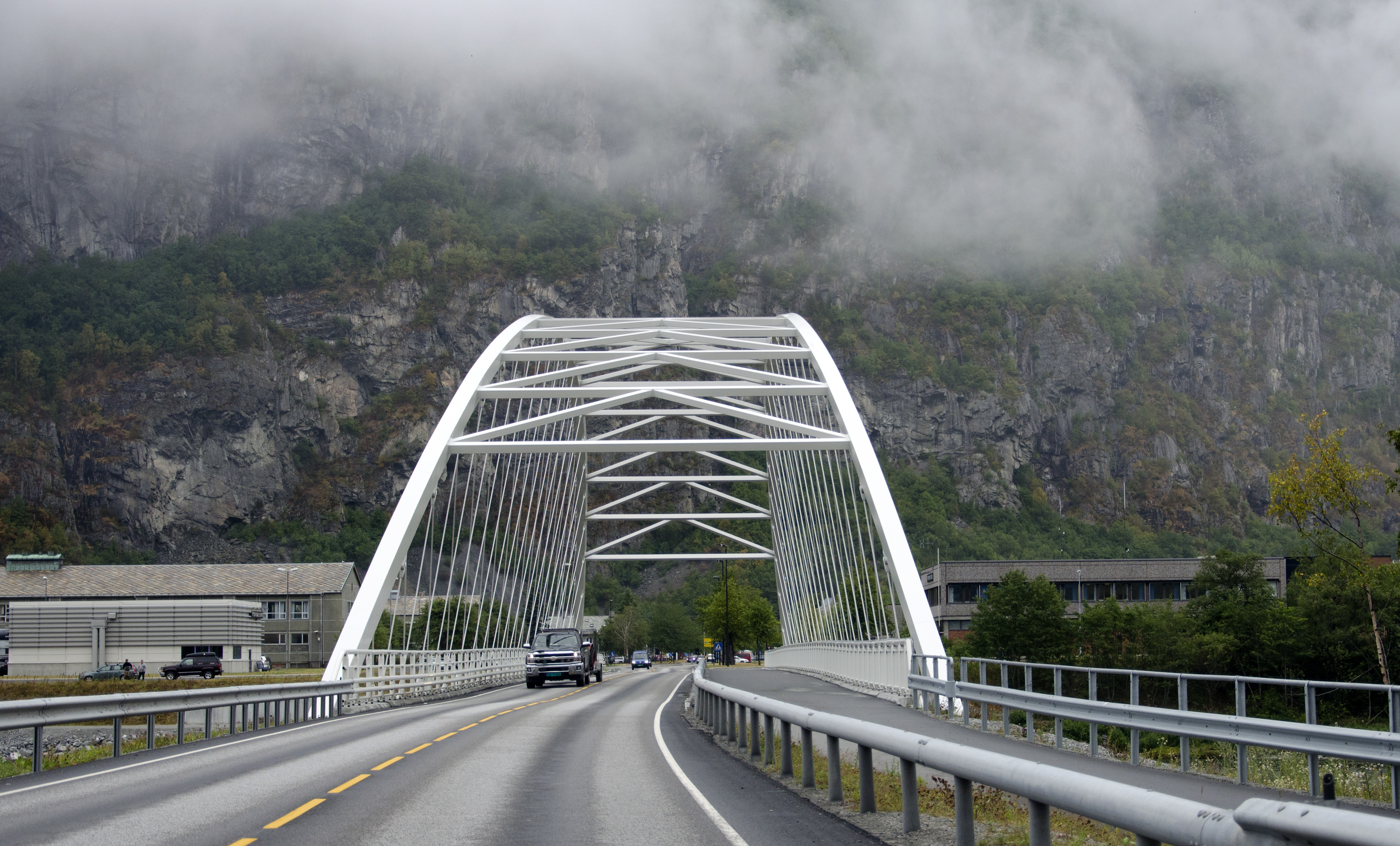
Bridge in Sunndalsøra

== Economy ==
Sunndalsøra is the largest village in Sunndal Municipality and it is home to Hov Church, the main church for the parish. Norsk Hydro operates an aluminium plant at Sunndalsøra. About 900 employees work at the plant, which has been operating since 1954. In 2004, the plant was modernized to become the biggest and among the most modern aluminium plants in Europe, greatly reducing pollution. In addition to aluminium related research, aquaculture research also takes place in Sunndalsøra, and many also work in public service in Sunndal municipality.

== Climate ==
Sunndalsøra has a temperate oceanic climate (Cfb). Atlantic lows can produce a strong foehn effect in winter. This occurs when there is a strong low located southwest of the coast bringing mild air from the Atlantic Ocean, and the air is further warmed when forced over the mountains, and a dry warm air comes down on the leeward side down to the fjord. Sunndalsøra has the national all-time high for all winter months: December with 18.3 °C (64.9 °F) recorded in 1998, January with 19.0 °C (66.2 °F), recorded 2 January 2020. This is also the warmest winter temperature ever recorded in Scandinavia. And in February with 18.9 °C (66.0 °F) recorded 23 February 1990.

The record high 33.1 °C (91.6 °F) is from 21 July 2025, and the record low −18.9 °C (−2.0 °F) is from February 2010.

Climate data for Sunndalsøra 1991-2020 (6 m, extremes 1983-2025)
Month	Jan	Feb	Mar	Apr	May	Jun	Jul	Aug	Sep	Oct	Nov	Dec	Year
Record high °C (°F)	19 (66)	18.9 (66.0)	18.4 (65.1)	22.2 (72.0)	30 (86)	31.9 (89.4)	33.1 (91.6)	31.7 (89.1)	27.6 (81.7)	25 (77)	21.6 (70.9)	18.3 (64.9)	33.1 (91.6)
Mean daily maximum °C (°F)	5.1 (41.2)	4.3 (39.7)	6.9 (44.4)	10.7 (51.3)	14.7 (58.5)	17.6 (63.7)	19.9 (67.8)	19.4 (66.9)	16 (61)	10.8 (51.4)	7.5 (45.5)	5.1 (41.2)	11.5 (52.7)
Daily mean °C (°F)	1.6 (34.9)	1.1 (34.0)	2.9 (37.2)	6.6 (43.9)	10.2 (50.4)	13.1 (55.6)	15.5 (59.9)	15.2 (59.4)	12 (54)	7.3 (45.1)	4.3 (39.7)	1.8 (35.2)	7.6 (45.8)
Mean daily minimum °C (°F)	−1.2 (29.8)	−1.6 (29.1)	0.1 (32.2)	3 (37)	6.3 (43.3)	9.4 (48.9)	12 (54)	11.9 (53.4)	8.7 (47.7)	4.4 (39.9)	1.5 (34.7)	−1.1 (30.0)	4.4 (40.0)
Record low °C (°F)	−16.6 (2.1)	−18.9 (−2.0)	−16 (3)	−6.3 (20.7)	−1 (30)	0.7 (33.3)	4 (39)	0.9 (33.6)	−1.5 (29.3)	−7.3 (18.9)	−11.4 (11.5)	−16.7 (1.9)	−18.9 (−2.0)
Average precipitation mm (inches)	92 (3.6)	85 (3.3)	79 (3.1)	59 (2.3)	58 (2.3)	80 (3.1)	73 (2.9)	100 (3.9)	95 (3.7)	93 (3.7)	89 (3.5)	101 (4.0)	1,004 (39.4)
Average precipitation days (≥ 1.0 mm)	13	13	14	11	12	15	14	15	13	12	11	12	155
Source 1: Norwegian Meteorological Institute
Source 2: Noaa WMO averages 91-2020 Norway

Old climate normal

Climate data for Sunndalsøra 1960-1990
Month	Jan	Feb	Mar	Apr	May	Jun	Jul	Aug	Sep	Oct	Nov	Dec	Year
Record high °C (°F)	19.0 (66.2)	18.9 (66.0)	18.4 (65.1)	22.2 (72.0)	28.1 (82.6)	31.2 (88.2)	32.1 (89.8)	31.7 (89.1)	27.6 (81.7)	25 (77)	21.6 (70.9)	18.3 (64.9)	32.1 (89.8)
Mean daily maximum °C (°F)	2 (36)	3 (37)	4 (39)	9 (48)	13 (55)	16 (61)	18 (64)	17 (63)	14 (57)	9 (48)	5 (41)	3 (37)	9 (49)
Mean daily minimum °C (°F)	−2 (28)	−2 (28)	−1 (30)	2 (36)	6 (43)	9 (48)	12 (54)	11 (52)	8 (46)	4 (39)	1 (34)	−1 (30)	4 (39)
Record low °C (°F)	−16.6 (2.1)	−18.9 (−2.0)	−16 (3)	−6.3 (20.7)	−1 (30)	0.7 (33.3)	4 (39)	0.9 (33.6)	−1.5 (29.3)	−7.3 (18.9)	−11.4 (11.5)	−16.7 (1.9)	−18.9 (−2.0)
Average precipitation mm (inches)	77 (3.0)	62 (2.4)	72 (2.8)	55 (2.2)	51 (2.0)	60 (2.4)	89 (3.5)	86 (3.4)	112 (4.4)	102 (4.0)	93 (3.7)	102 (4.0)	961 (37.8)
Average precipitation days	10	9	10	9	8	11	13	13	14	12	11	13	133
Source 1: Storm.no
Source 2: Eklima/met.no

== Notable people ==
- Guro Reiten (born 1994), footballer for the Norway national team
