= Sula =

Sula may refer to:

== Places ==
=== Norway ===
- Sula Municipality, a municipality in Møre og Romsdal county
- Sula, Møre og Romsdal, an island in Sula municipality, Møre og Romsdal county
- Sula, Solund, an island in Solund municipality, Vestland county
- Ytre Sula (Solund), an island in Solund municipality, Vestland county
- Sula, Trøndelag, an island group in Frøya municipality, Trøndelag county
- Indre Sula and Ytre Sula, two mountains in Surnadal municipality, Møre og Romsdal county

=== Other locations ===
- Sula, Iran, a village in Ardabil Province, Iran
- Sula, Montana, a census-designated place in the United States
- Sula Island, an island in the Philippines
- Sula Islands, Indonesia
  - Sula Islands Regency
- Šuľa, a village and municipality in the Banská Bystrica Region of southern Slovakia
- Sula (Dnieper), a tributary of the Dnieper in Ukraine
- Sula (Mezen), a tributary of the Mezen in northern Russia
- Sula (Pechora), a tributary of the Pechora in northern Russia
- Sula Sgeir, an island group in Scotland
- San Pedro Sula, a city in Honduras
- Sula Valley, a valley in Honduras

== People ==
=== Given name ===
- Sula Benet (1903–1982), Polish anthropologist
- Sula Wolff (1924–2009), British psychiatrist
- Sula Miranda (b. 1963), Brazilian singer, television presenter and writer
- Sula Matovu (b. 1992), Ugandan association footballer
- Sula Bermúdez-Silverman (b. 1993), American multimedia artist

=== Surname ===
- Lambert Suła (d. 1071), Polish bishop
- Hannes Sula (1894–1955), Finnish-Canadian revolutionary and journalist
- Karel Šula (b. 1959), Slovak shot putter
- Dashnor Sula (b. 1969), Albanian politician
- Ion Sula (b. 1980), Moldovan politician
- Erion Sula (b. 1986), Albanian association footballer
- Dmytro Sula (b. 1994), Ukrainian association footballer
- Jessica Sula (b. 1994), Welsh actress
- Erik Šuľa (b. 1995), Slovak association footballer
- Din Sula (b. 1998), Belgian association footballer
- Samuel Suľa (b. 2000), Slovak association footballer

== Other uses ==
- Sula (bird), a genus of seabirds
- Sula (novel), a 1973 novel by Toni Morrison
- Sula (brand), a Honduran fruit juice brand
- Sula language, an Austronesian language of Indonesia
- Sula people, an ethnic group in Indonesia
- SulA, an SOS response protein
- Sula, a 1969 children's novel by Lavinia Derwent, with three sequels
- Sula II, a boat that ran trips to the island bird sanctuaries off North Berwick, Scotland
- Caroline Sula, a character in Dread Empire's Fall, a space-opera trilogy
- Sula Vineyards, a winery in the Nashik region of India
- LV 14 Sula, a preserved lightvessel

== See also ==
- Sulla, an early Roman consul and dictator
