= Ytre =

Ytre is the Norwegian word for "outer". It may refer to:

People:

- Knut Ytre-Arne (1896–1968), Norwegian politician for the Liberal Party

Places:

- Ytre Østfold, the outer coastal area of Østfold county, Norway
- Ytre Øydnavatnet, lake in Lyngdal Municipality in Agder county, Norway
- Ytre Arna, settlement in the borough of Arna in Bergen Municipality in Vestland county, Norway
- Ytre Enebakk, village in Enebakk Municipality in Akershus county, Norway
- Ytre Norskøya, island on the northwest coast of Spitsbergen, part of the Svalbard archipelago
- Ytre Oslofjord, the part of the Oslofjord which is south of Drøbaksund in Eastern Norway
- Ytre Rendal Municipality, a former municipality in the old Hedmark county, Norway
- Ytre Sandsvær Municipality, a former municipality in Buskerud county, Norway
- Ytre Sula, mountain in Surnadal Municipality in Møre og Romsdal county, Norway
- Ytre Tasta, neighborhood in the borough Tasta in Stavanger Municipality in Rogaland county, Norway

== See also ==
- Ytres, commune in the Pas-de-Calais department in the Nord-Pas-de-Calais region of France
