= Neådalssnota =

Mountain in Surnadal, Norway

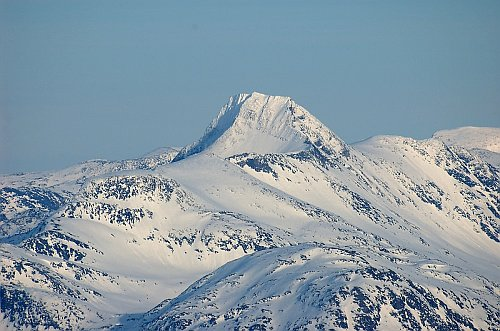
- Neådalssnota seen from Vassnebba/Grånebba (west)

Highest point
- Elevation: 1,621 m (5,318 ft)
- Prominence: 665 m (2,182 ft)
- Coordinates: 62.7780°N 9.0820°E

Geography
- Interactive map of the mountain
- Location: Møre og Romsdal, Norway
- Parent range: Trollheimen
- Topo map: 1420 I Snota

Neådalssnota is a mountain in the center of the Trollheimen mountain range. It lies in Surnadal Municipality in Møre og Romsdal county, Norway. The mountain Snota lies just to the north, just next to the lake Gråsjøen.

Neådalssnota, due to its large southeastern flank, is easily seen among the Trollheimen mountains.
