= Lønset =

Village in Oppdal Municipality, Norway

- Village
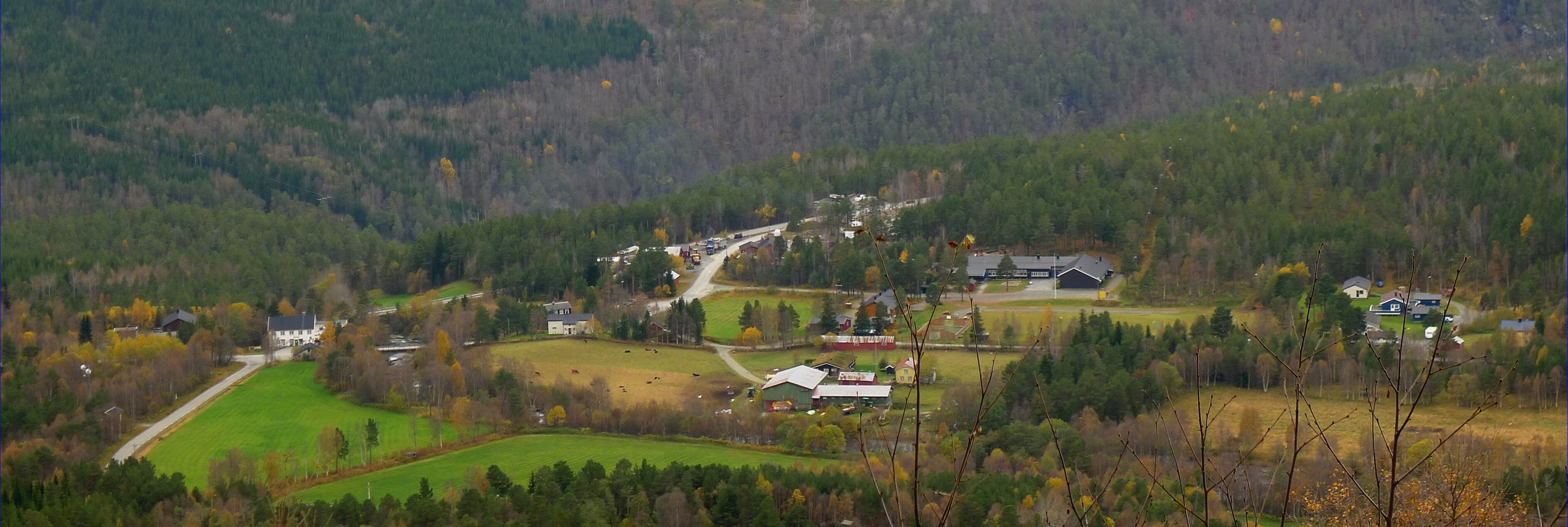
- View of the village
- Interactive map of Lønset
- Location within Trøndelag Location within Norway
- Coordinates: 62.5834°N 09.3439°E
- Country: Norway
- Region: Central Norway
- County: Trøndelag
- District: Dovre
- Municipality: Oppdal Municipality
- Elevation: 480 m (1,570 ft)
- Time zone: UTC+01:00 (CET)
  - Summer (DST): UTC+02:00 (CEST)
- Post Code: 7342 Lønset

Lønset is a village in Oppdal Municipality in Trøndelag county, Norway. The village is located along the Norwegian National Road 70, about 13 kilometres (8.1 mi) west of the village of Vognillan and about 20 kilometres (12 mi) west of the municipal center of Oppdal. The lakes Ångardsvatnet and Gjevillvatnet lie about 10 kilometres (6.2 mi) to the north of Lønset.

Lønset Church is located in the village and it is the parish church for the western part of Oppdal Municipality.

== Media gallery ==
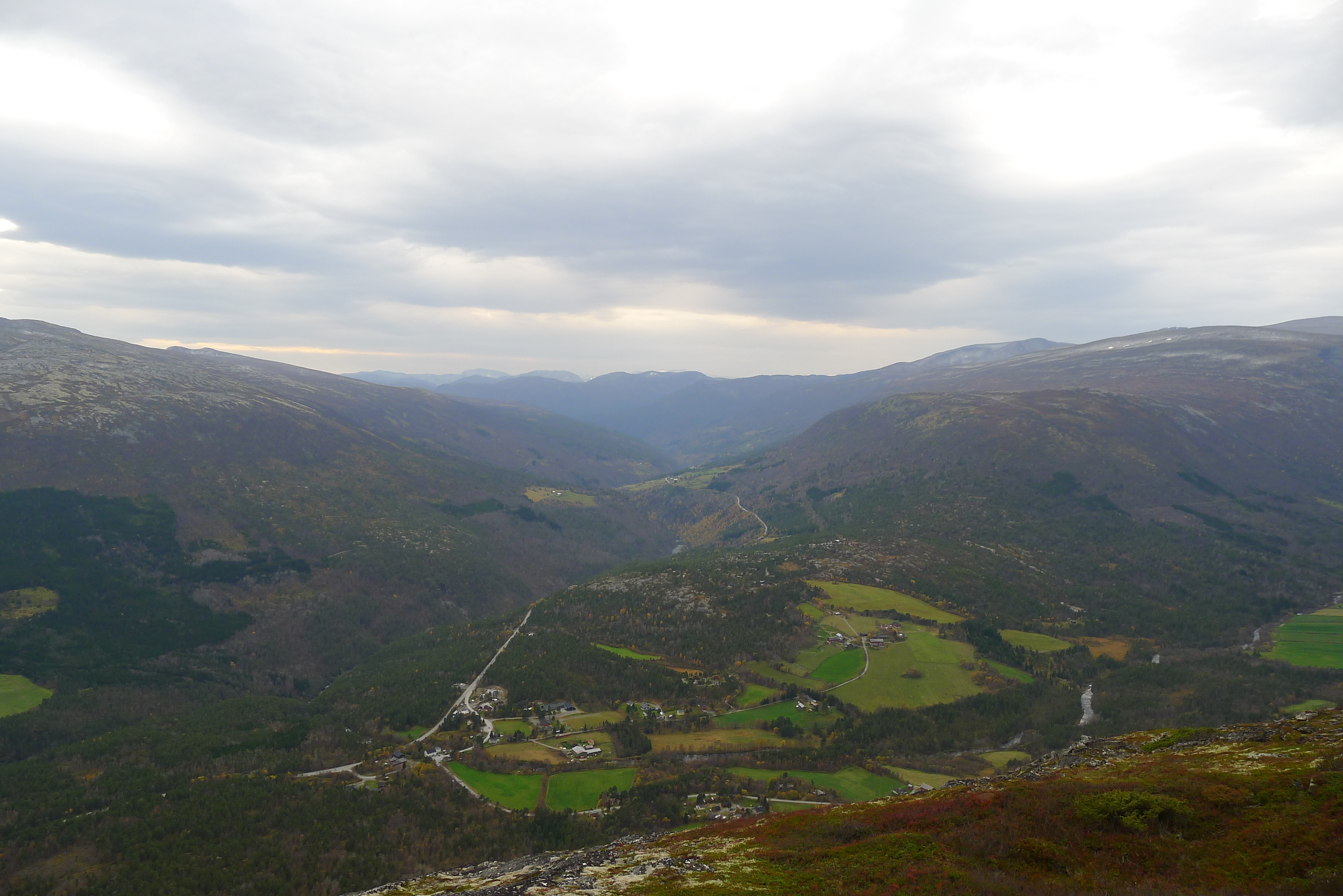
View of the Lønset area in Oppdal

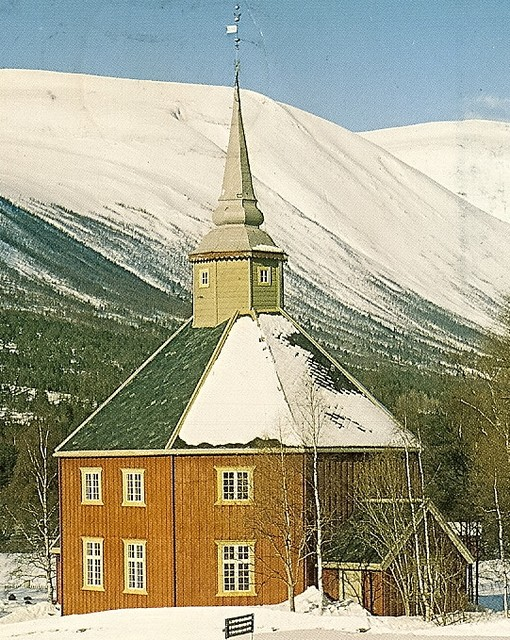
Lønset Church
