= Trollhøtta =

Mountain in Trøndelag and Møre og Romsdal, Norway

- Folddalstrollhøtta
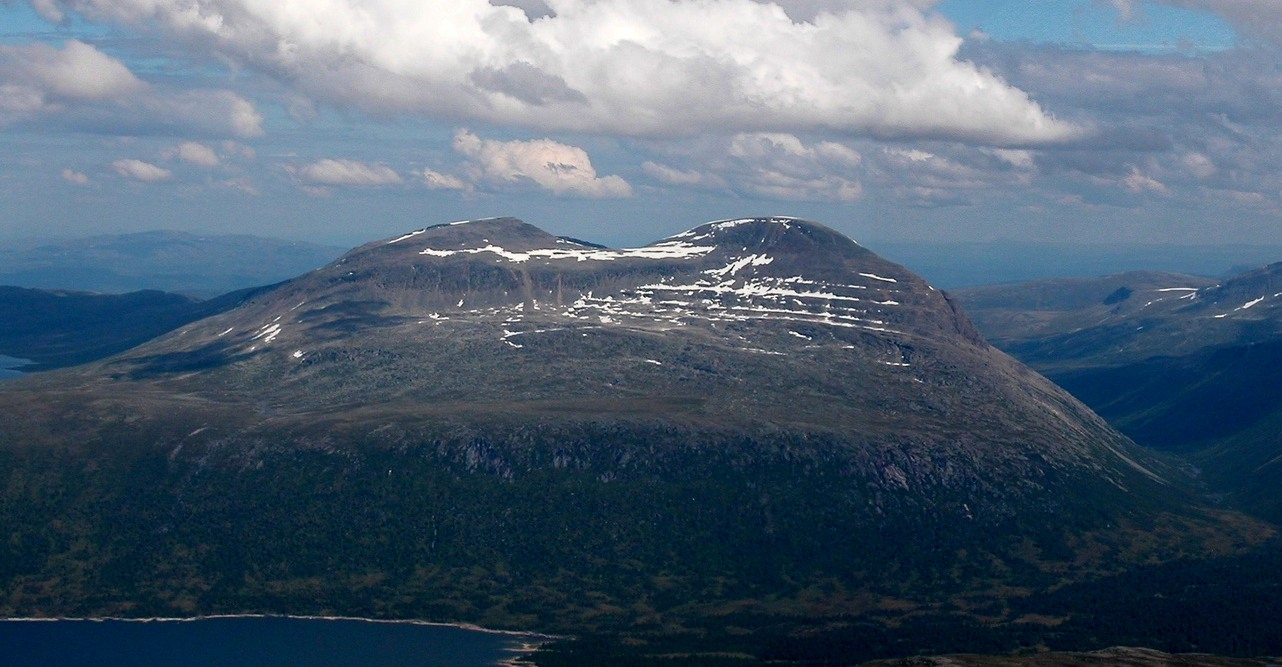
- Trollhetta seen from the west (from the summit of Snota). Highest point is the right peak. The lake Gråsjøen is visible in the lower left.

Highest point
- Elevation: 1,616 m (5,302 ft)
- Prominence: 884 m (2,900 ft)
- Isolation: 10.28 to 10.3 km (6.39 to 6.40 mi)
- Coordinates: 62.8520°N 09.3244°E

Geography
- Interactive map of the mountain
- Location: Trøndelag/Møre og Romsdal, Norway
- Parent range: Trollheimen
- Topo map: 1420 I Snota

Trollhøtta is a mountain on the border of Rindal Municipality in Trøndelag county and Surnadal Municipality in Møre og Romsdal counties in Norway. The 1,616-metre (5,302 ft) tall mountain is part of the Trollheimen mountain range, just east of the lake Gråsjøen and the mountains Snota and Neådalssnota. To the south, across the valley Svartådalen, you see the mountains Geithetta and Svarthetta.

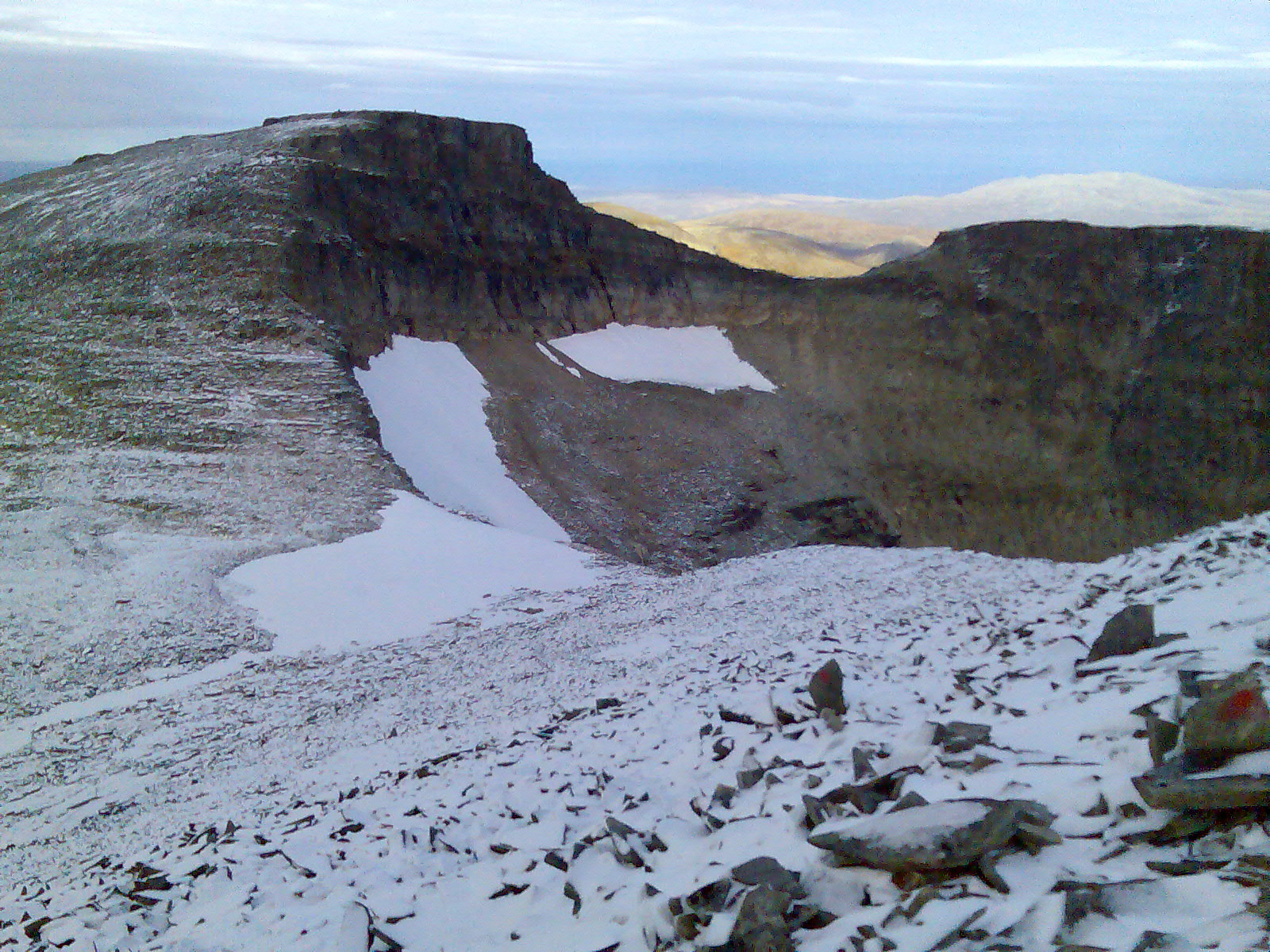
Northern peak seen from the saddle between the northern and southern peak.

The mountain has three peaks: the eastern peak is 1,522 metres (4,993 ft) tall, the north one is 1,596 metres (5,236 ft) and the south one is 1,616 metres (5,302 ft). You can access all three peaks during the summer, but a sharp and steep ridge between the eastern and northern peak is problematic in the winter for access from the east. The Norwegian Mountain Touring Association has a cabin, Trollheimshytta, near the foot of the northern peak. In the east, there is the cabin Jøldalshytta.
