= Ångardsvatnet =

Lake in Trøndelag county, Norway

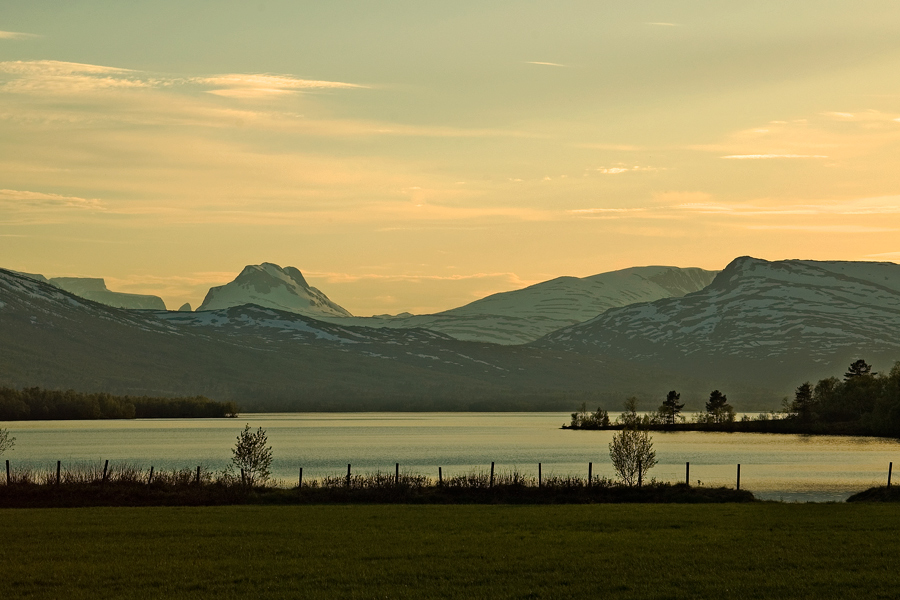
- View of the lake Credit: Sigmund Rise

- Location within Norway Location within Trøndelag
- Interactive map of the lake
- Location: Oppdal Municipality, Trøndelag
- Coordinates: 62.673056°N 09.160833°E
- Type: Lake
- Primary outflows: Haugelva River
- Basin countries: Norway
- Max. length: 4.8 km (3.0 mi)
- Max. width: 950 m (3,120 ft)
- Surface area: 3.24 km^{2} (1.25 sq mi)
- Shore length^{1}: 11.3 km (7.0 mi)
- Surface elevation: 583 m (1,913 ft)
- References: NVE
- ^{1} Shore length is not a well-defined measure.

Ångardsvatnet is a lake in Oppdal Municipality in Trøndelag county, Norway. The 3.24-square-kilometre (1.25 sq mi) lake lies in the Storlidalen valley, about 13 km (8.1 mi) northwest of the village of Lønset and about 35 km (22 mi) west of the village of Oppdal. The lake is about 4.8 km (3.0 mi) long and about 950 m (3,120 ft) wide. It is surrounded by the Trollheimen mountain range including the mountains Gråfjellet, Kråkvasstind, and Lorthøa to the south and Bårdsgardskammen and Okla to the north. The lake Gjevillvatnet lies in the next valley to the north of Ångardsvatnet.

== Regulation ==
The lake was regulated in connection with the development of Driva power plant, which opened in 1973. The lake Ångardsvatnet is connected to the lake Dalsvatnet through the river Haugelva, which is only 1.7 km (1.1 mi) long. After the smaller lake Dalsvatnet, the water flows through a dam into the river Vindøla and it then flows east to the river Driva at the village of Lønset. The regulation of the two lakes has resulted in very little water flow in the river Vindøla for parts of the year.

== Uses ==
The lake Ångardsvatnet offers good swimming and other activities such as fishing and boating during the summer. Surrounding landowners lease out fishing rights and sell fishing permits for sports fishing in the summers. In the winter, the lake offers groomed ski trails and good opportunities for ice fishing. There is an annual ice fishing contest around Easter each year.

== See also ==
- List of lakes in Norway
