= Såtbakkollen =

Mountain in Sunndal, Norway

- Såtbakkkollen (historic)
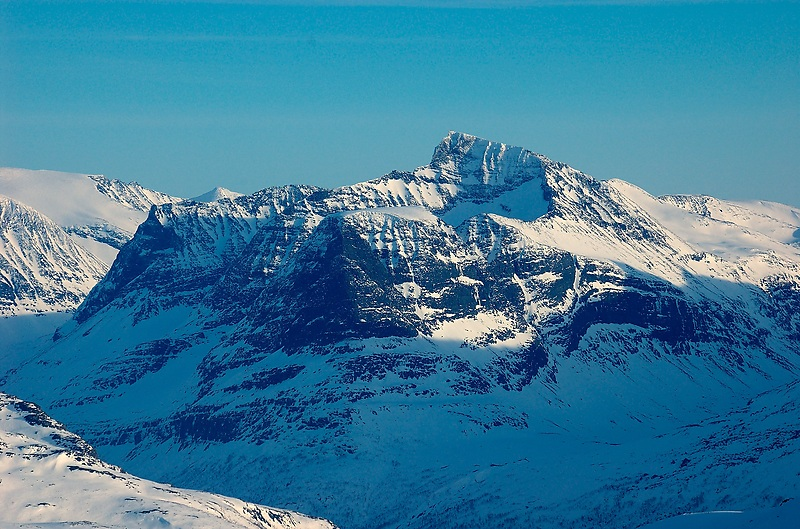
- Tåga seen from Vassnebba. Såtbakkollen is visible in the background far right. Innerdalstårnet is also visible though difficult to distinguish from the background (Tårnfjellet).

Highest point
- Elevation: 1,632 m (5,354 ft)
- Prominence: 30 m (98 ft)
- Coordinates: 62°40′05″N 08°48′51″E

Geography
- Interactive map of the mountain
- Location: Sunndal Municipality, Møre og Romsdal, Norway
- Parent range: Trollheimen
- Topo map(s): 1420 I Snota and 1420 II Romfo

Climbing
- Easiest route: Scrambling

Såtbakkollen is a 1,632-metre (5,354 ft) tall mountain in Sunndal Municipality in Møre og Romsdal county, Norway. It is located in the Trollheimen mountain range, just north of the Sunndalen valley. It forms the southern end of the "Tårn massif", which also includes Tåga, Tårnfjellet, and the quite famous Innerdalstårnet. Other mountains nearby include Navardalsnebba, Trolla, and Skarfjellet.

The name "Såtbakkollen" is also commonly used for the peak Tåga (elevation: 1,840 metres or 6,040 feet, prominence: 950 metres or 3,120 feet; second highest point in Trollheimen). Tåga is actually located about 2.5 kilometres (1.6 mi) further north, probably because the name "Tåga" was missing from older maps.
