= Indre Sula =

Mountain in Surnadal, Norway

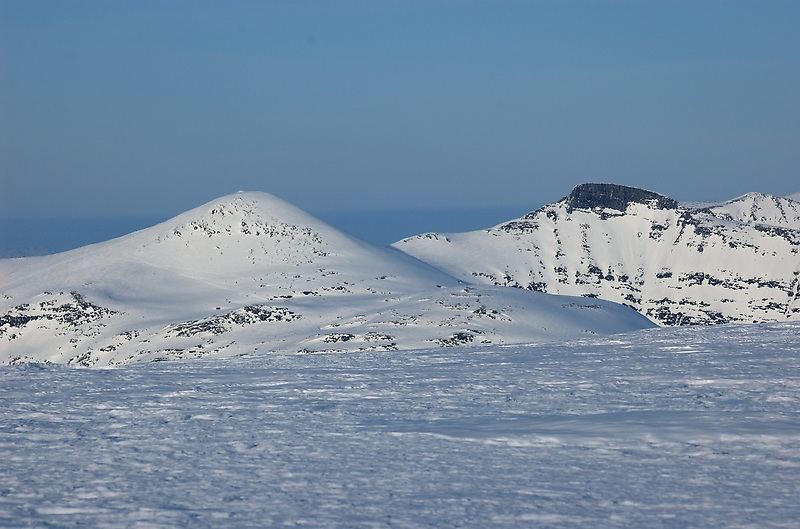
- Indre Sula (right), seen from Vassnebba/Grånebba. Ytre Sula to the left.

Highest point
- Elevation: 1,325 m (4,347 ft)
- Coordinates: 62.8542°N 8.7493°E

Geography
- Interactive map of the mountain
- Location: Møre og Romsdal, Norway
- Parent range: Trollheimen
- Topo map: 1420 I Snota

Indre Sula is a mountain in Surnadal Municipality in Møre og Romsdal county, Norway. It is part of the Trollheimen mountain range, and it lies just north of the village of Todalsøra and the Todalsfjorden.

Indre Sula, meaning "Inner Sula", lies next to Ytre Sula, meaning "Outer Sula". The route from Indre Sula to Ytre Sula is scrambling.
