= Snota =

Mountain in Surnadal, Norway

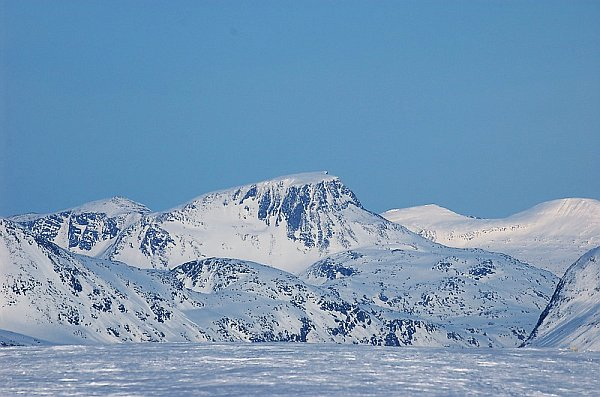
- Snota seen from Vassnebba (west). Litjsnota to the left.

Highest point
- Elevation: 1,668 m (5,472 ft)
- Prominence: 880 m (2,890 ft)
- Isolation: 21.17 to 21.19 km (13.15 to 13.17 mi)
- Coordinates: 62°50′50″N 9°05′39″E

Geography
- Interactive map of the mountain
- Location: Møre og Romsdal, Norway
- Parent range: Trollheimen
- Topo map: 1420 I Snota

Snota is a prominent mountain in the Trollheimen mountain range in Surnadal Municipality in Møre og Romsdal county, Norway. It is also the highest mountain in Surnadal Municipality. It lies to the west of the mountain Trollhetta and north of the mountain Neådalssnota.

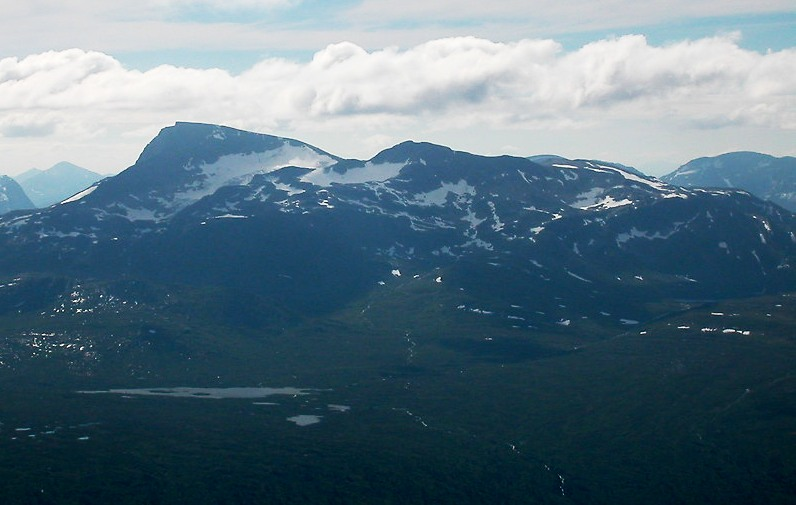
Snota seen from Trollhetta (east).

The peak is accessible from a parking lot by the lake Gråsjøen, from the cabin Trollheimshytta (owned by the Norwegian Mountain Touring Association), and also from Vindøldalen/Vassdalen valley to the west (though less common).

The main peak is 1,668 metres (5,472 ft) tall and approximately 1 kilometre (0.62 mi) to the north, there is the neighboring 1,562-metre (5,125 ft) tall summit of Litjsnota. The south wall of Snota is 200 metres (660 ft) high and it was first climbed in 1994. The first winter ascent was in 1997. Below the wall is the small Snota glacier.
