= Innerdalen =

Valley in Sunndal, Norway

Innderdalen
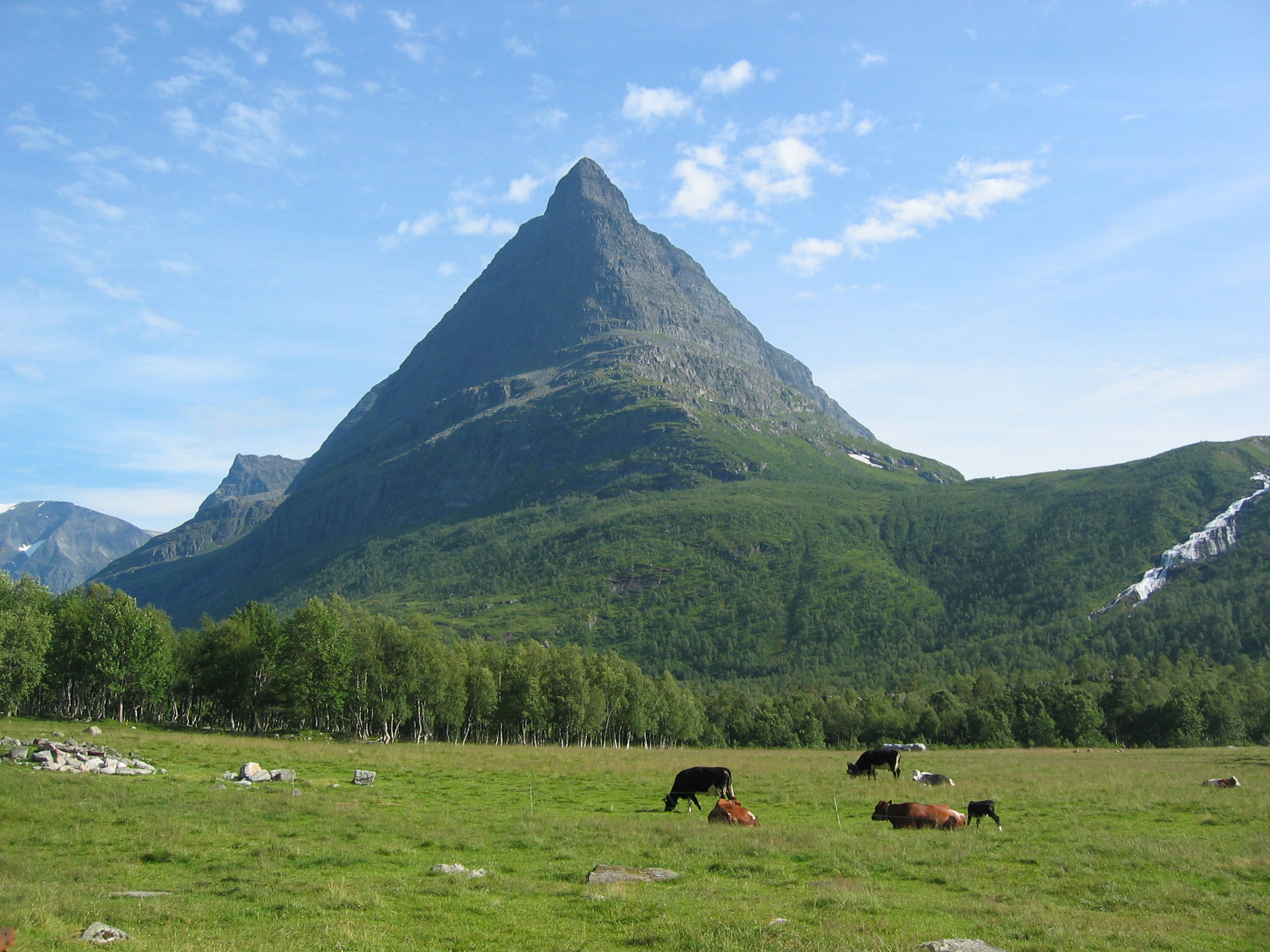
- Innerdalstårnet seen from the valley floor
- Length: 25 kilometres (16 mi)

Geology
- Type: River valley

Geography
- Location: Møre og Romsdal, Norway
- Coordinates: 62°43′52″N 08°44′43″E
- River: Ålvundelva river
- IUCN category V (protected landscape/seascape)
- Location: Sunndal Municipality, Møre og Romsdal, Norway
- Nearest city: Sunndalsøra
- Area: 73 square kilometres (28 sq mi)
- Established: 1967
- Governing body: Norwegian Directorate for Nature Management

Location
- Interactive map of Innderdalen

Innerdalen is a valley in Sunndal Municipality in Møre og Romsdal county, Norway. In 1967, the valley was established as Norway's first nature reserve. The valley and nature reserve begins at the village of Ålvundeidet by the Norwegian National Road 70 in the west and stretches approximately 25 kilometres (16 mi) to the east to Innerdalsporten. It lies within the Trollheimen mountain range.

The valley is regularly visited by mountain climbers. Some of the mountains include Store Trolla (1,850 metres or 6,070 feet, highest in Trollheimen), Skarfjellet (1,790 metres or 5,870 feet), and Innerdalstårnet (1,452 metres or 4,764 feet). For glacier hiking, there is a glacier on top of Kongskrona called Vinnufonna.

In 2001, Norsk Tindeklub (Norwegian Mountaineering Association) released a mountain guide for Innerdalen (in Norwegian) and they also have a private cabin, Giklingdalshytta, beneath the mountain Innerdalstårnet. The Norwegian Mountain Touring Association has two cabins in the valley, Innerdalshytta (originally built 1889) and Renndølsetra.
