= Folda (Rindal) =

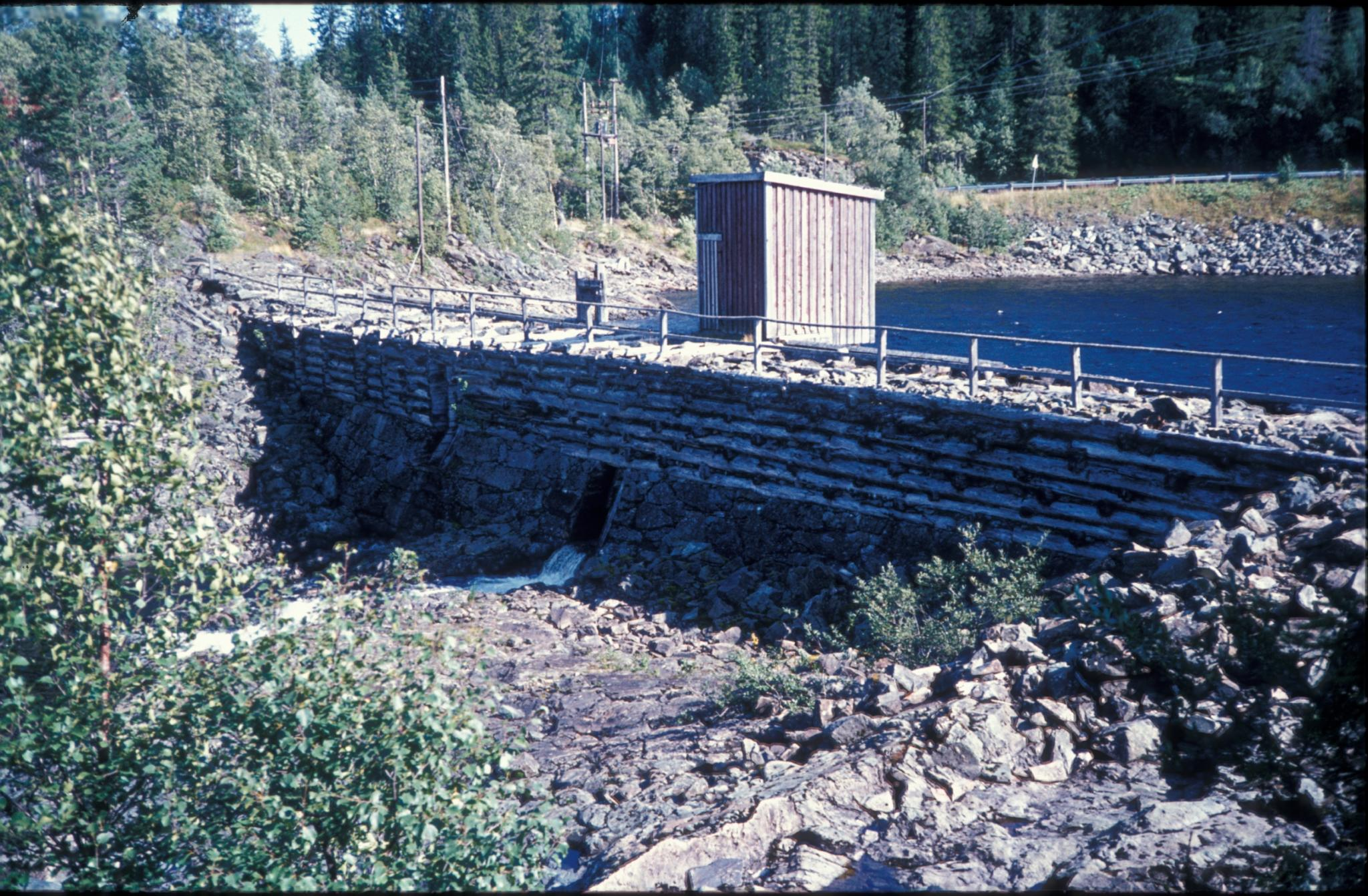
- Reservoir on the Folda River

Location
- Country: Norway
- Counties: Møre og Romsdal, Trøndelag
- Municipalities: Surnadal Municipality, Rindal Municipality

Physical characteristics
- Source: Trollheimen mountains
  - location: Surnadal/Oppdal border
  - coordinates: 62.757869°N 9.1408825°E
  - elevation: 0 metres (0 ft)
- Mouth: Surna River
  - location: Surnadal Municipality, Møre og Romsdal
  - coordinates: 63.02286°N 9.086509°E
  - elevation: 44 metres (144 ft)
- Length: 40 km (25 mi)
- Basin size: 350 km^{2} (140 sq mi)

The Folda is a river in Møre og Romsdal and Trøndelag counties in Norway. The river is part of the Surna watershed and flows into the Surna 7 kilometers (4.3 mi) west-southwest of the village of Rindal in Rindal Municipality in Trøndelag county. It has its source in the Trollheimen mountains on the border of Surnadal Municipality in Møre og Romsdal county and Oppdal Municipality in Trøndelag county. The river heads northwards and, for a time, it forms the border between Møre og Romsdal and Trøndelag counties. Two reservoirs lie along the course of the river: Lake Fold (Norwegian: Foldsjø or Follsjø) and Gray Lake (Norwegian: Gråsjø). The Folda has a catchment area of 350 square kilometers (140 mi^{2}) and is fed by several tributaries: the Rinna, Bulu, and Vindøla. The name of the river comes from Old Norse Fold, probably meaning 'the broad one'.

== See also ==
- List of rivers in Norway
