= Blåhøa, Trøndelag =

Mountain in Oppdal, Norway

Blåhøa
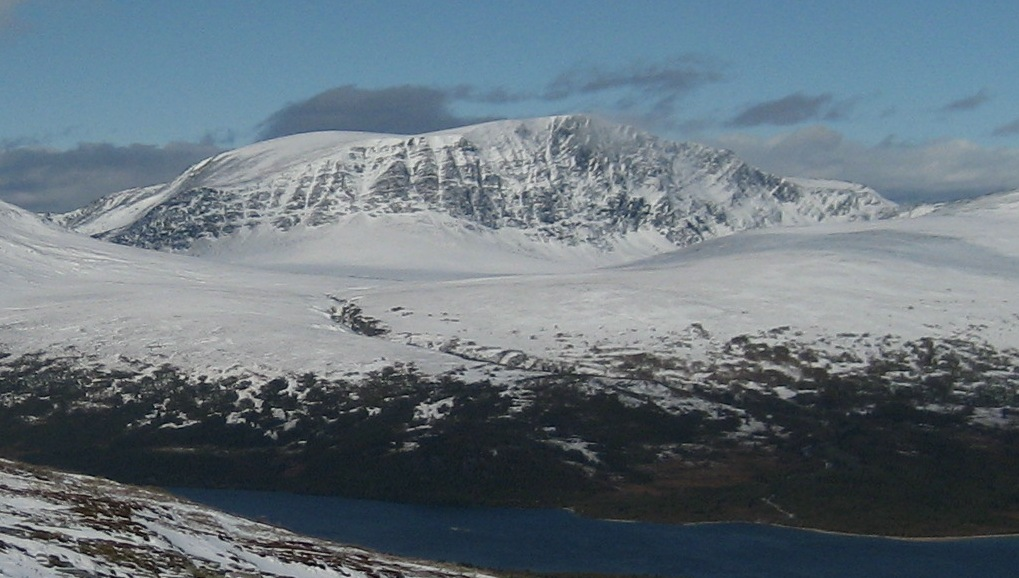

Highest point
- Elevation: 1,671 m (5,482 ft)
- Prominence: 910 m (2,990 ft)
- Isolation: 17.78 km (11.05 mi) to Kråkvasstinden
- Coordinates: 62.7542°N 09.3323°E

Geography
- Interactive map of the mountain
- Location: Trøndelag, Norway
- Parent range: Trollheimen
- Topo map: 1520 IV Trollhetta

Blåhøa is a mountain in Oppdal Municipality in Trøndelag county, Norway. It is the highest mountain at the northeastern side of the Trollheimen mountain range. The mountain is located in the northwestern part of Oppdal, about 5 kilometres (3.1 mi) north of the lake Gjevillvatnet, about 14 kilometres (8.7 mi) west of the village of Nerskogen (in Rennebu Municipality), and about 20 kilometres (12 mi) northwest of the village of Vognillan.

The 1,671-metre (5,482 ft) tall mountain has a topographic prominence of 910 metres (2,990 ft). The Speilsalen glacial tunnel was located about 1.5 kilometres (0.93 mi) northeast of the peak.

== Name ==
The first element is blå which means "blue", and the last element is hø which means a "large and round mountain".
