= Skarfjellet =

Mountain in Sunndal, Norway

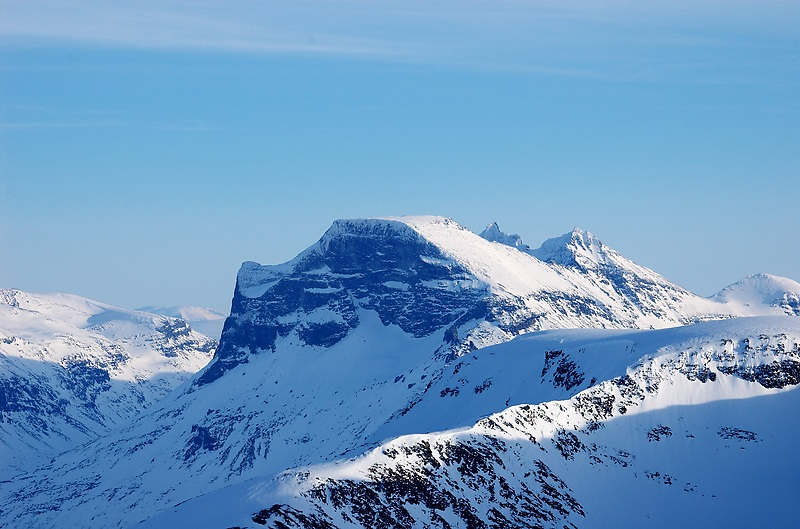
- Skarfjellet seen from Vassnebba

Highest point
- Elevation: 1,790 m (5,870 ft)
- Coordinates: 62°42′12″N 08°43′40″E

Geography
- Interactive map of the mountain
- Location: Sunndal Municipality, Møre og Romsdal, Norway
- Parent range: Trollheimen
- Topo map: 1420 II Romfo

Skarfjellet is a 1,790-metre (5,870 ft) tall mountain in Sunndal Municipality in Møre og Romsdal county, Norway. It lies along the southern side of the Innerdalen valley, just west of the mountain Innerdalstårnet, and about 9 kilometres (5.6 mi) northeast of the village of Sunndalsøra. It is the northern peak along the Trolla ridge where the highest point is Store Trolla at 1,850 metres (6,070 ft). The mountain is a popular rock climbing destination.
