= Ytre Sula =

Mountain in Surnadal, Norway

- Nordviksula
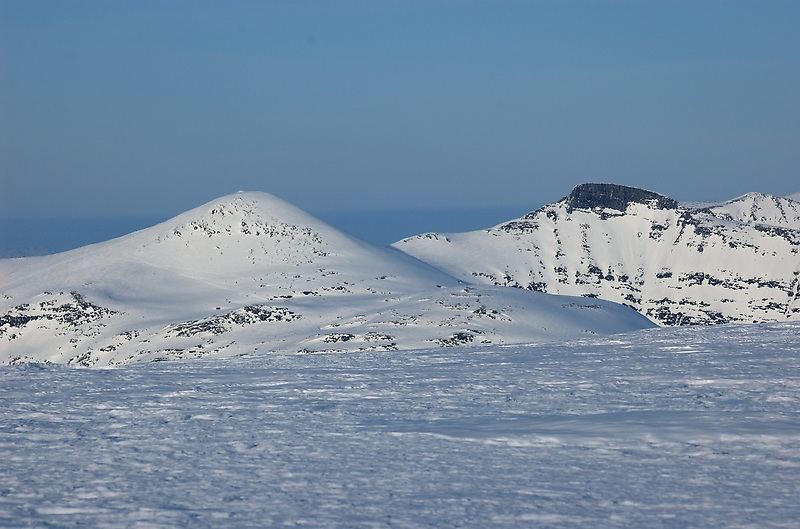
- Ytre Sula to the left, seen from Vassnebba/Grånebba. Indre Sula to the right.

Highest point
- Elevation: 1,318 m (4,324 ft)
- Coordinates: 62.8553°N 8.7267°E

Geography
- Interactive map of the mountain
- Location: Møre og Romsdal, Norway
- Parent range: Trollheimen
- Topo map(s): 1420 I Snota (summit) and 1420 IV Stangvik (ascent from west)

Ytre Sula (locally called Nordviksula) is a mountain in Surnadal Municipality in Møre og Romsdal county, Norway.

== Location ==
The peak lies just north of the village of Todalsøra and the Todalsfjorden. Ytre Sula, meaning "Outer Sula", lies next to Indre Sula, meaning "Inner Sula". The route from Ytre Sula to Indre Sula is scrambling.
