= Lønset Church =

Church in Trøndelag, Norway

- Lønset kirke
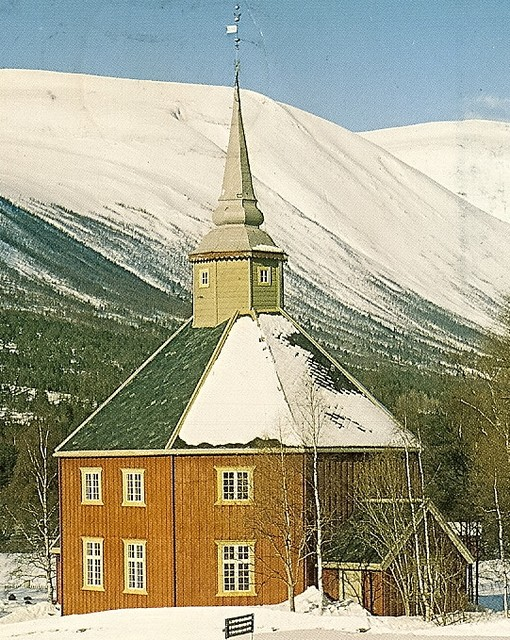
- View of the church
- Lønset Church
- 62.58862664°N 09.346943199°E
- Location: Oppdal Municipality, Trøndelag
- Country: Norway
- Denomination: Church of Norway
- Churchmanship: Evangelical Lutheran

History
- Status: Parish church
- Founded: 1774
- Consecrated: 26 August 1863

Architecture
- Functional status: Active
- Architect: Sjur Jamtseter
- Architectural type: Octagonal
- Completed: 1863 (163 years ago)

Specifications
- Capacity: 250
- Materials: Wood

Administration
- Diocese: Nidaros bispedømme
- Deanery: Gauldal prosti
- Parish: Lønset
- Norwegian Cultural Heritage Site
- Type: Church
- Status: Listed
- ID: 84363

Lønset Church (Norwegian: Lønset kirke) is a parish church of the Church of Norway in Oppdal Municipality in Trøndelag county, Norway. It is located in the village of Lønset, along the Norwegian National Road 70 in the western part of the municipality. It is the church for the Lønset parish which is part of the Gauldal prosti (deanery) in the Diocese of Nidaros. The white, wooden church was built in an octagonal style in 1863 using plans drawn up by the architect Sjur Jamtseter and the carpenter J. Rønningen. The church seats about 250 people.

== History ==
The first church in Lønset was a stave church that was likely located at Vindal, along the west shore of the river Vindøla, about 2 kilometres (1.2 mi) northwest of the present church site. The church was built during the Middle Ages and it likely fell into ruin after the Black death when the Lønset area was depopulated. For a few centuries, there was no church in use in Lønset. From 1772 to 1774, a new church was once again built in Lønset. This one was located about 2 kilometres (1.2 mi) southeast of the old medieval church site. In 1858, a committee was formed that would work on planning for a new church at Lønset because the old church was too small. Two solutions were outlined: a cruciform church designed by John Elliott Storli or an octagonal church designed by Sjur Jamtseter. The committee chose the octagonal design. The last worship service there was on Sunday, 19 July 1863 and after that, the old church was torn down. The new church was built on the same site and it was consecrated on 26 August 1863.

== Media gallery ==
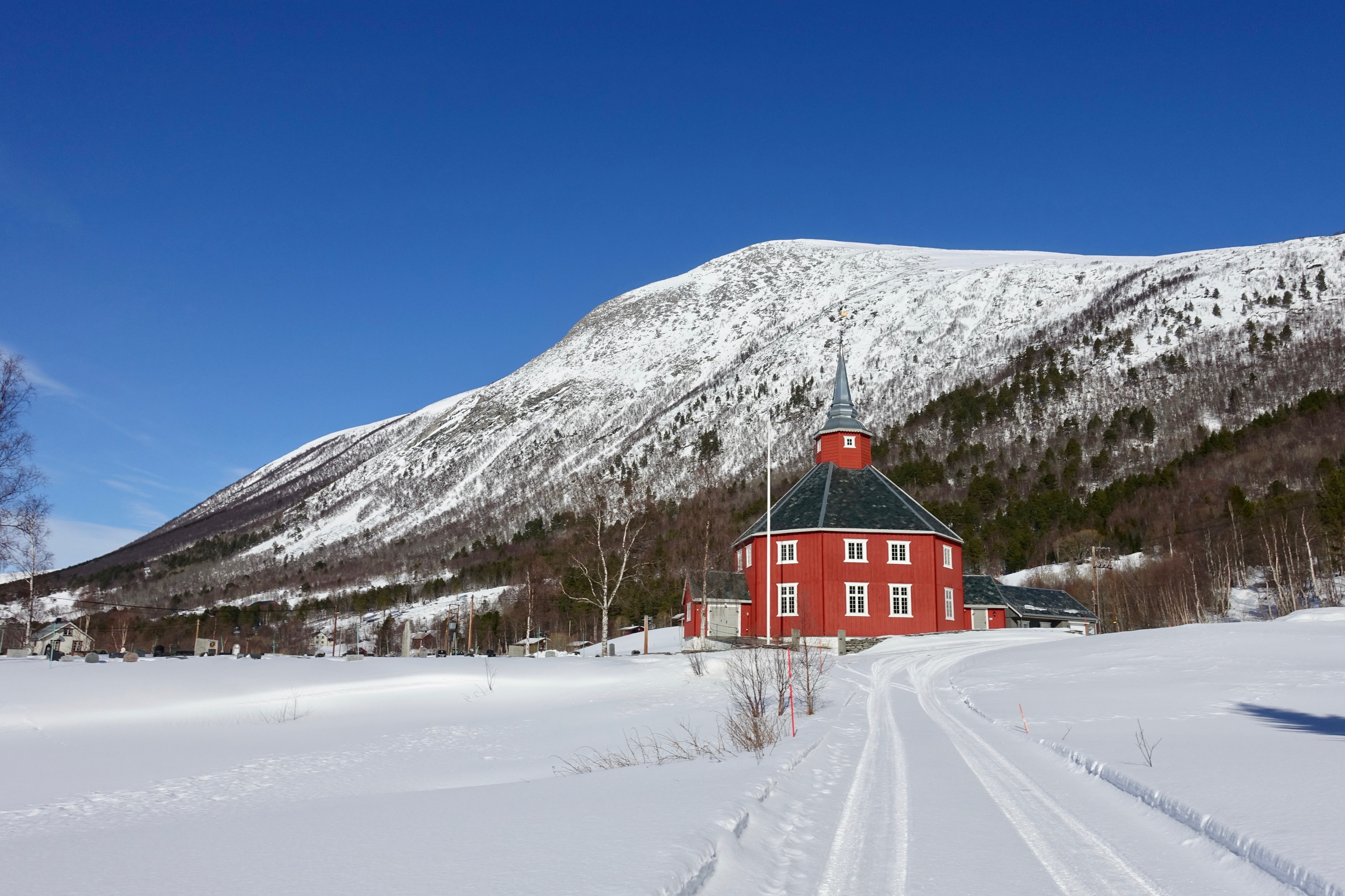

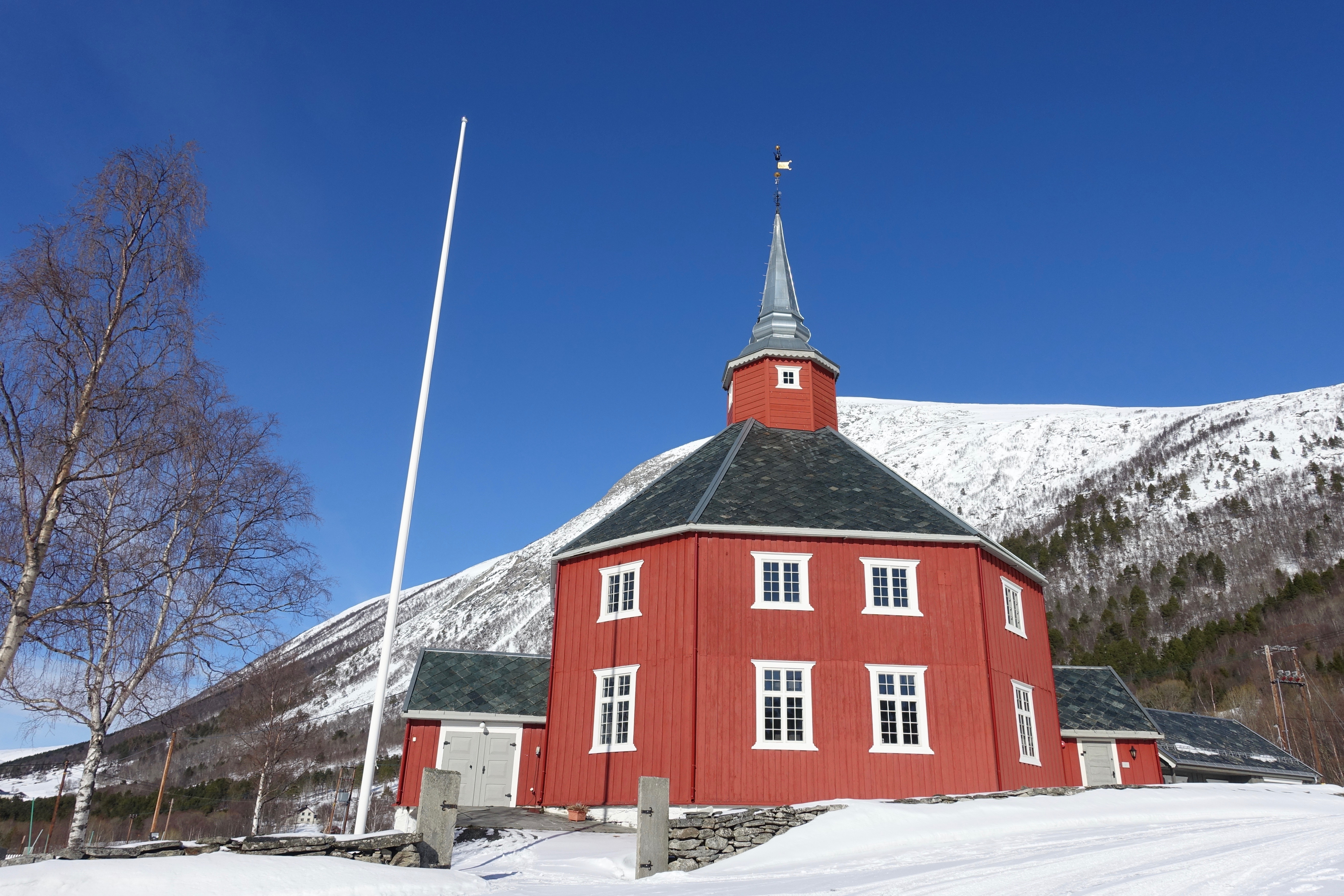

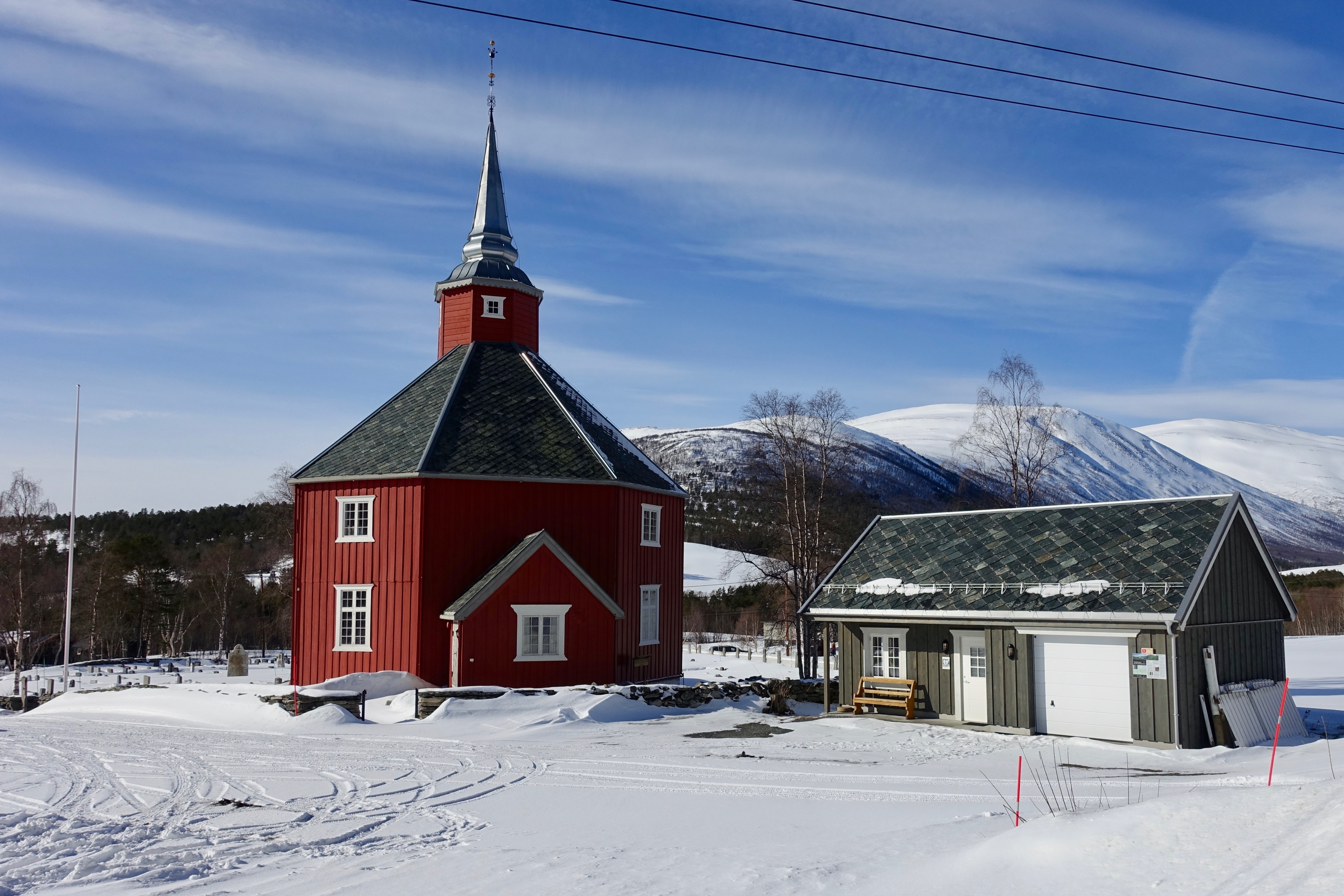

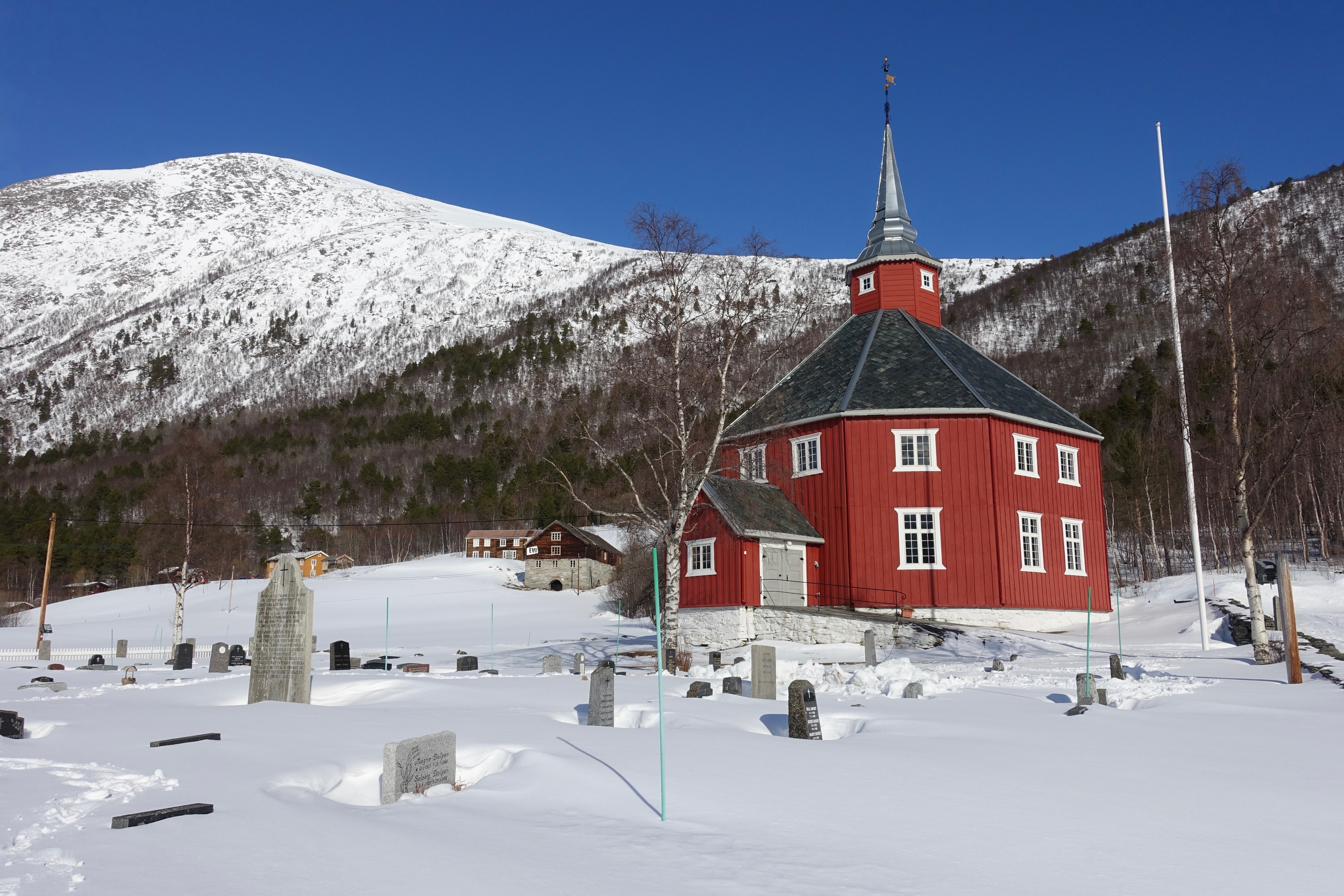

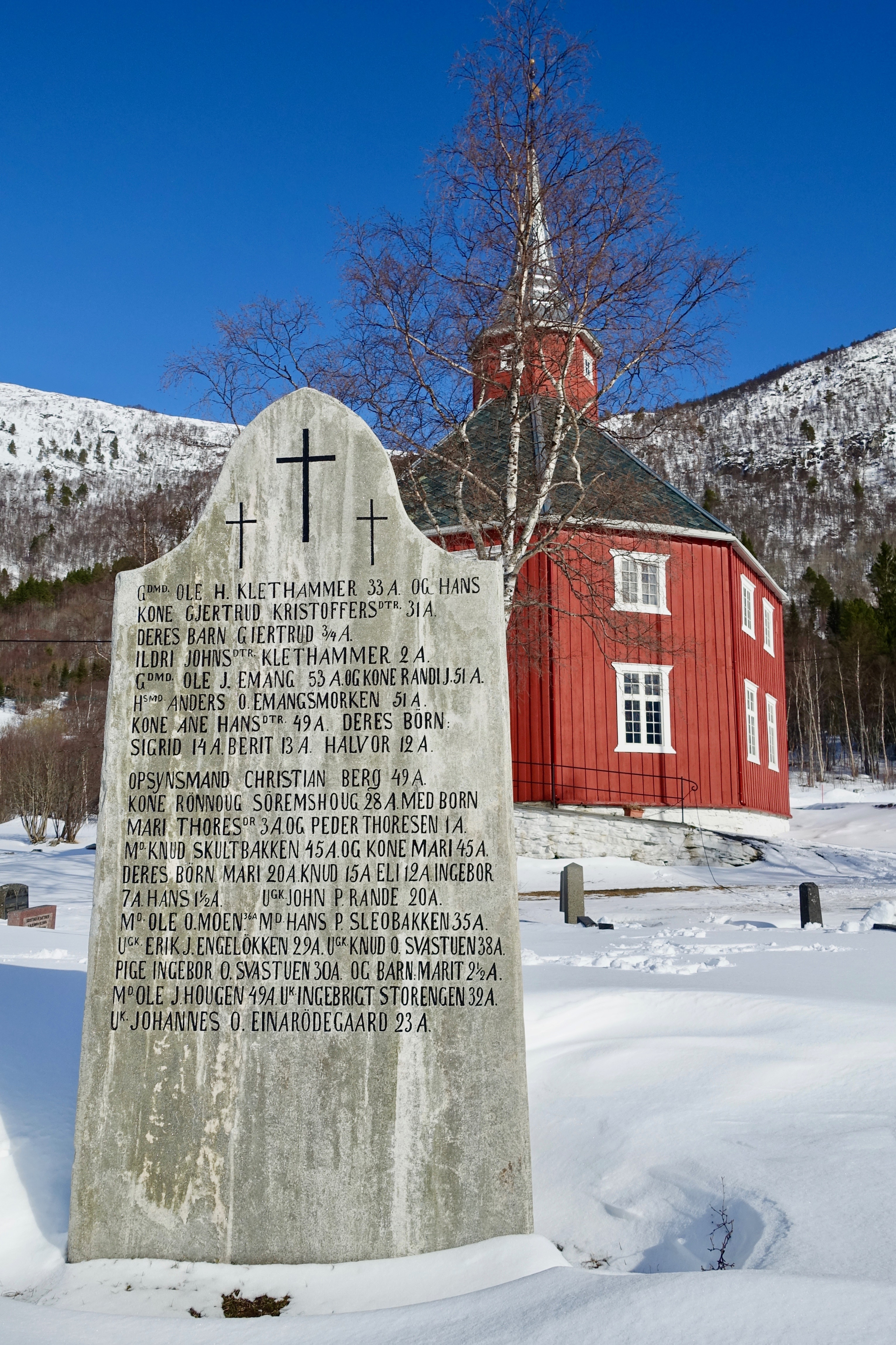

== See also ==
- List of churches in Nidaros
