= Vognillan =

Village in Oppdal Municipality, Norway

- Village
- Interactive map of Vognillan
- Location within Trøndelag Location within Norway
- Coordinates: 62.6157°N 09.5688°E
- Country: Norway
- Region: Central Norway
- County: Trøndelag
- District: Dovre
- Municipality: Oppdal Municipality
- Elevation: 596 m (1,955 ft)
- Time zone: UTC+01:00 (CET)
  - Summer (DST): UTC+02:00 (CEST)
- Post Code: 7343 Vognill

Vognillan is a village in Oppdal Municipality in Trøndelag county, Norway. The village is located along the Norwegian National Road 70, about 13 kilometres (8.1 mi) east of the village of Lønset, about 7 kilometres (4.3 mi) west of the municipal center of Oppdal, and about 20 kilometres (12 mi) south of the village of Nerskogen (in the neighboring Rennebu Municipality). The lake Gjevillvatnet lies about 5 kilometres (3.1 mi) northwest of the village.
