= Glacier cave =

Cave formed within the ice of a glacier

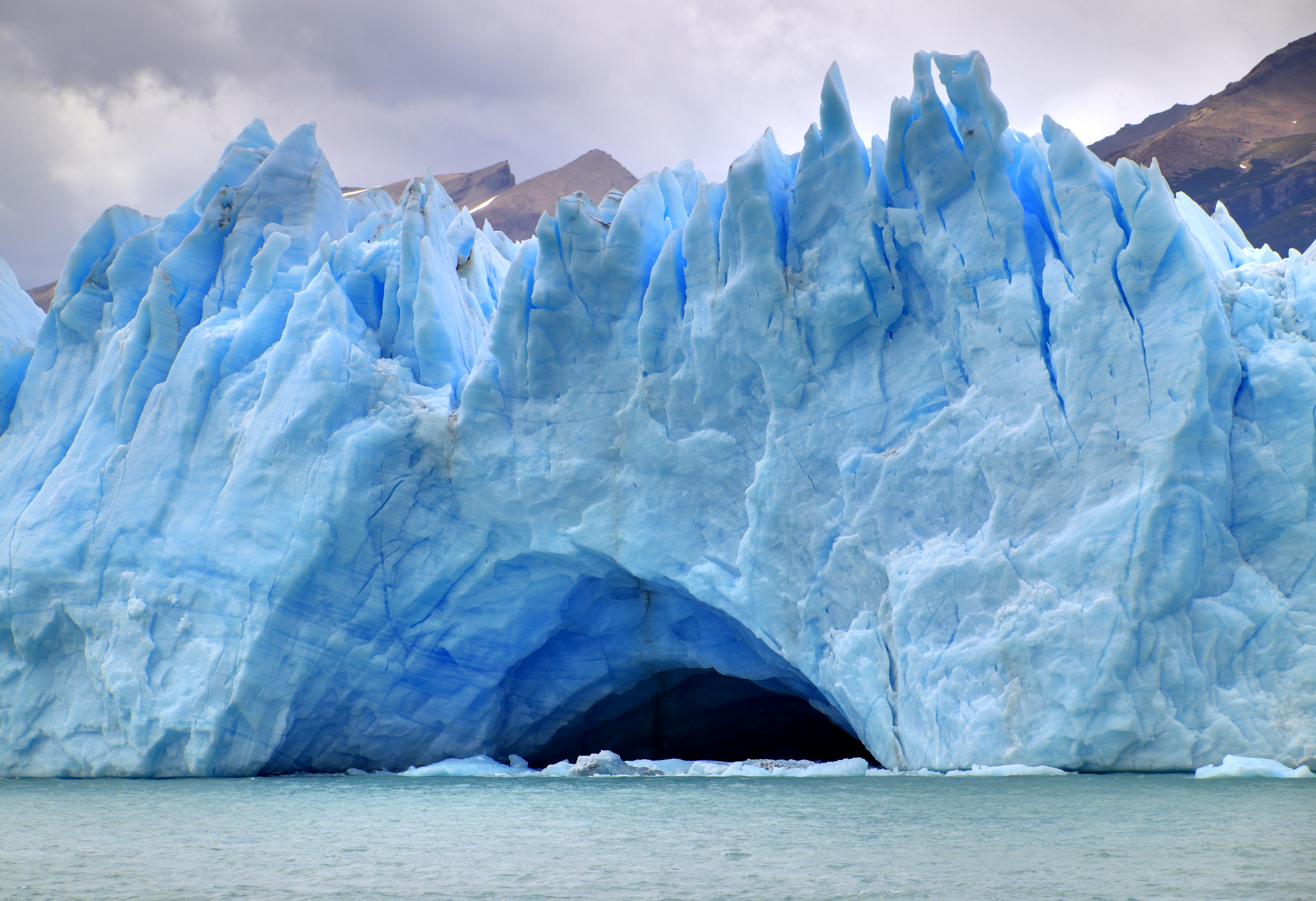
A partly submerged glacier cave on Perito Moreno Glacier. The ice facade is approximately 60 m high.

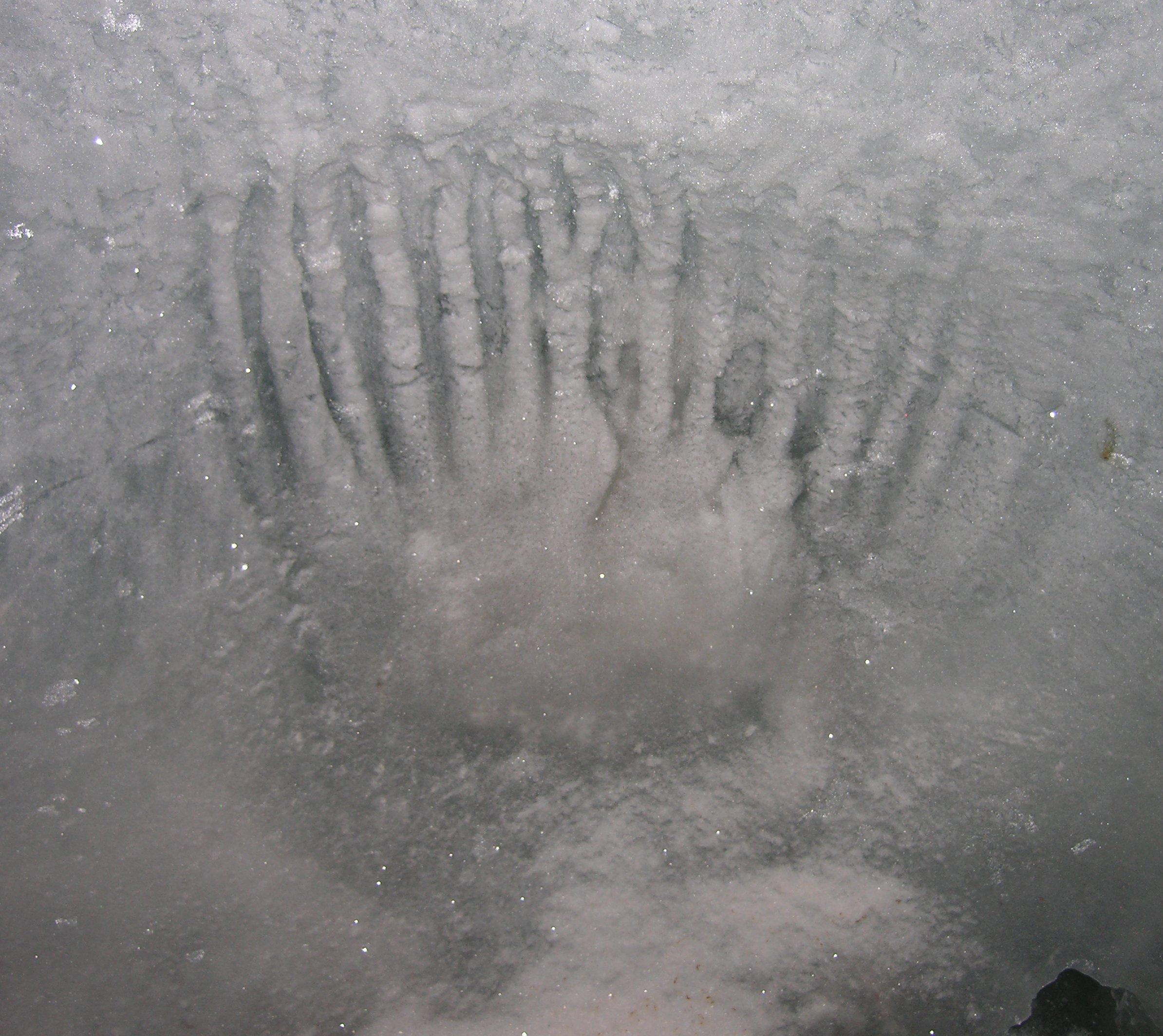
Ice formations in the Titlis glacier cave

A glacier cave is a cave formed within the ice of a glacier. Glacier caves are often called ice caves, but the latter term is properly used to describe bedrock caves that contain year-round ice.

== Overview ==
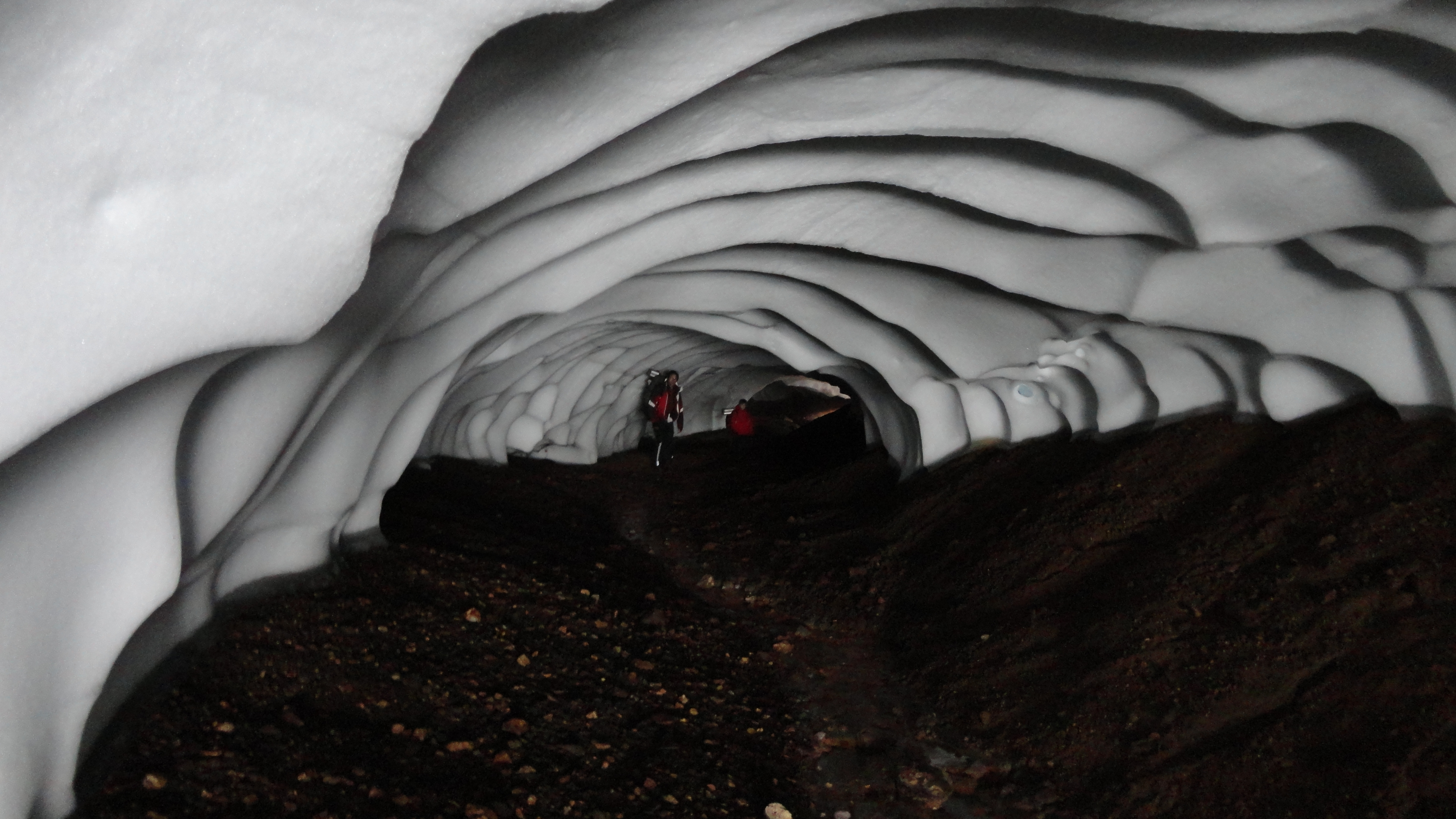
This glacier cave has been excavated by a hot spring underneath a snow field in south central Iceland, a country where such formations are common due to the high geothermal and volcanic activity, plus the high latitude, cold weather, and frequent snowfall.

Glacier caves form in the bottom edge of glacier ice. Although with low permeability in glacier ice, most glacier caves are started by water running through or under the glacier. This water often originates on the glacier's surface through melting, entering the ice at a moulin and exiting at the glacier's snout at base level.

Heat transfer from the water can cause sufficient melting to create an air-filled cavity, sometimes aided by solifluction. The water flow must dissipate enough heat to keep the glacier ice refreezing in polar areas. Air movement can then assist enlargement through melting in summer and sublimation in winter.

Meltwater reaches the bottom of the ice sheet through basement melting caused by geothermal heating and the melting of the ice surface under the pressure of the weight of the ice above. The downward infiltration are made of flow of melting superice in glacial systems.

== Formation ==
Some glacier caves are formed by geothermal heat from volcanic vents or hotsprings beneath the ice. Magma from volcanic activities reaches the bottom of glaciers and thus creates caves and channels to further form caves. An extreme example is the Kverkfjöll glacier cave in the Vatnajökull glacier in Iceland, measured in the 1980s at 2.8 kilometres (1.7 mi) long with a vertical range of 525 metres (1,722 ft).

== Stability ==
Many glacier caves are relatively unstable due to heat transportation and glacial motion, and are subject to localized or complete collapse, as well as elimination by glacial retreat. An example of the dynamic nature of glacier caves is the former Paradise Ice Caves, located on Mount Rainier in the United States.

Known since the early 1900s, the caves were thought to have disappeared altogether in the mid-1940s, yet in 1978 cavers measured 13.25 kilometres (8.23 mi) of passageways in glacier caves there, and it was then considered the longest glacier cave system in the world. The Paradise Ice Caves collapsed and vanished in the 1990s, and the lower lobe of the glacier which once contained the caves has also vanished entirely between 2004 and 2006.

Glacier caves may be used by glaciologists to gain access to the interior of glaciers. The study of glacier caves themselves is sometimes called "glaciospeleology".

== Examples ==
- Mount Rainier (Washington, US) Two craters on top of a cone on the volcano's summit contain the world's largest volcanic glacier-cave system.
- Perito Moreno Glacier (Argentina)
- Speilsalen (Norway) collapsed in 2007
- Titlis (Switzerland)

== See also ==
- Ice cave – Natural cave that contains significant amounts of year-round ice
