= Central Norway =

Informal region of Norway

Coordinates: 63°29′23″N 9°50′38″E

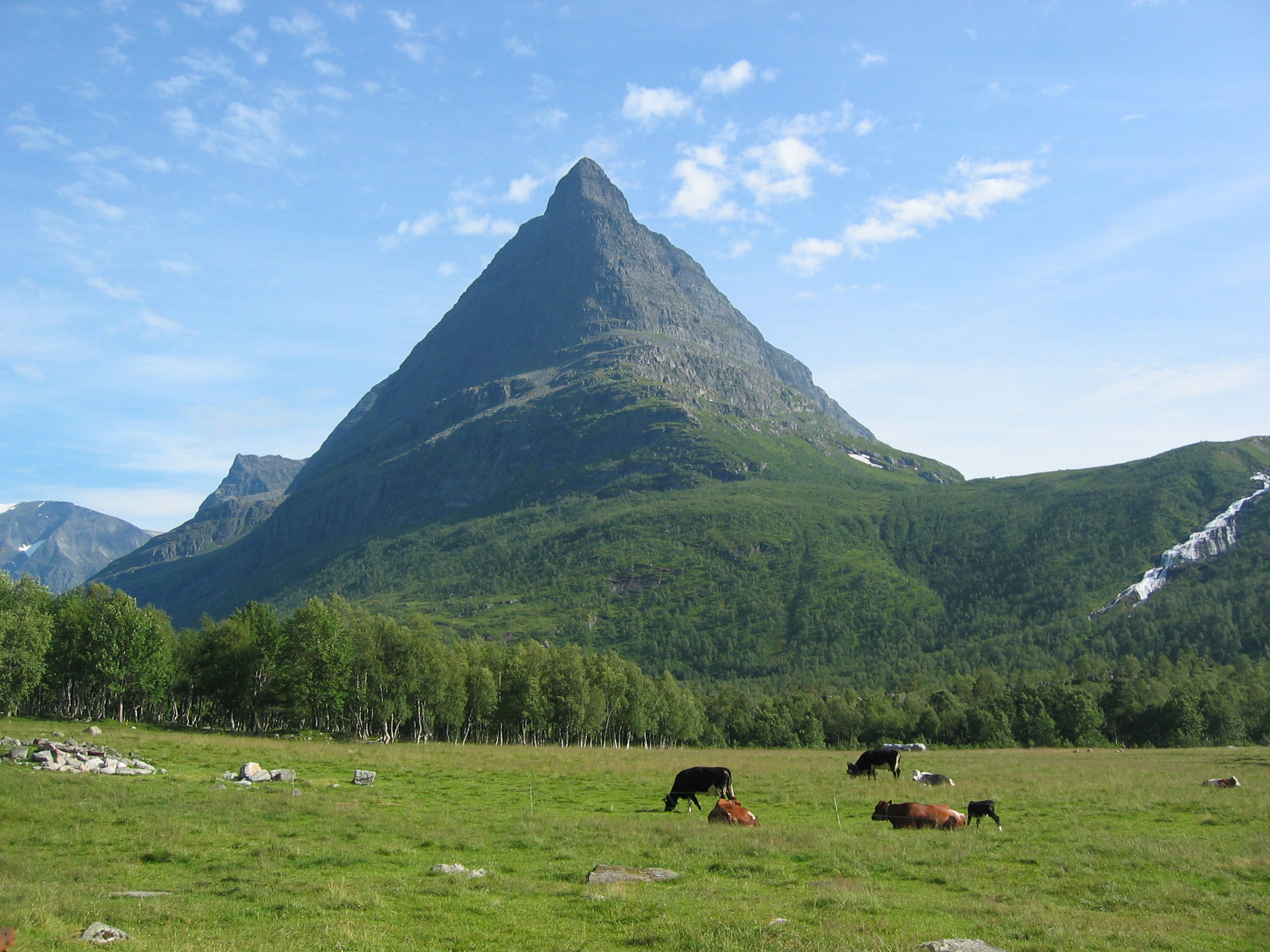
Innerdalstårnet in Trollheimen mountain range, Central Norway

Central Norway (Bokmål: Midt-Norge, Nynorsk: Midt-Noreg) is an informal, unclearly defined region of Norway. In its most limited usage, the term "Central Norway" may refer only to Trøndelag county; however, it may also be understood to include all or parts of the county of Møre og Romsdal, some parts of Nordland county, as well as some municipalities in the northern part of Innlandet county.

For example, the regional health authorities and the Norwegian Public Roads Administration uses the term "Central Norway" to describe Trøndelag and all of Møre og Romsdal counties. On the other hand, Norwegian Water Resources and Energy Directorate (NVE) uses it to describe all of Trøndelag, Møre (consisting of Sunnmøre and Nordmøre), and the Helgeland part of Nordland. Statsbygg, Norwegian Directorate of Public Construction and Property, uses it to describe all of Trøndelag and Møre og Romsdal, Nordland south of Bodø Municipality, as well as the northern parts of Innlandet county. The regional newspaper Adresseavisen defines Midt-Norge as Trøndelag, Nordmøre, and some municipalities in the northern part of Innlandet county. This also corresponds to the area covered by the newspaper.

That said, the most used definition is one that covers all of Trøndelag and Møre og Romsdal counties. Compared with the traditional regions of Norway, it therefore covers all of Trøndelag and some of Vestlandet regions. By this definition, it has a total population of just under 760,000 people, with the Trondheim metropolitan region accounting for roughly 275,000.

There has been some political movement towards replacing the counties with larger regions. It is then expected that much of Central Norway, at least Trøndelag and Nordmøre, will form one such region due to the historical, cultural and linguistic ties.

== Sources ==
- Statistics Norway
- Adresseavisen: Vil ha færre og større regioner, 22 April 2007 (in Norwegian)
- NRK Nyheter: Foreslår ni regioner, 2 July 2006 (in Norwegian)
