= Speilsalen =

Glacial formation in Oppdal, Norway

Coordinates: 62°46′8.56″N 9°21′9.90″E

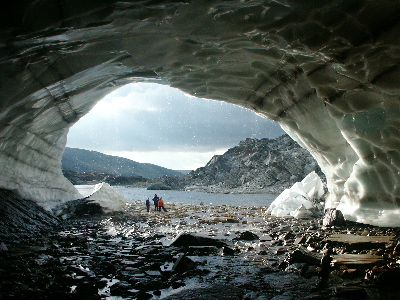
Speilsalen

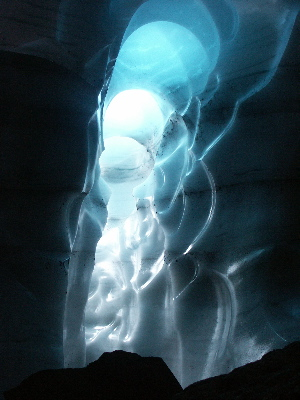
Inside Speilsalen

Speilsalen (lit. 'The Hall of Mirrors') was a natural glacier cave formed by a river underneath a glacier in the Trollheimen mountains in Oppdal Municipality in Trøndelag county, Norway. It was located at the northeast base of the mountain Blåhøa.

Under favourable conditions late summer, it was possible to walk the 200 to 300 metres (660 to 980 ft) from one end to the other underneath the glacier. It was never considered safe to walk under a glacier. Speilsalen collapsed in August 2007.
