= Foldsjøen =

- Interactive map of the lake
- Location: Møre og Romsdal and Trøndelag
- Coordinates: 62.9655°N 09.1193°E
- Type: Reservoir
- Primary inflows: Gråsjøen
- Primary outflows: Folda River
- Basin countries: Norway
- Max. length: 6 kilometres (3.7 mi)
- Max. width: 1.6 kilometres (0.99 mi)
- Surface area: 6.79 km^{2} (2.62 sq mi)
- Shore length^{1}: 18.19 kilometres (11.30 mi)
- Surface elevation: 420 metres (1,380 ft)
- References: NVE
- ^{1} Shore length is not a well-defined measure.

Foldsjøen is a reservoir located on the border of Surnadal Municipality in Møre og Romsdal and Rindal Municipality in Trøndelag counties in Norway. The lake is dammed from the Folda River and the water is used in the Trollheim power station. Slightly more elevated and directly to the south is the Gråsjøen reservoir, which is also behind a hydro-power dam.

== See also ==
- List of lakes in Norway
