= Trolla (mountain) =

Mountain in Sunndal, Norway

Store Trolla
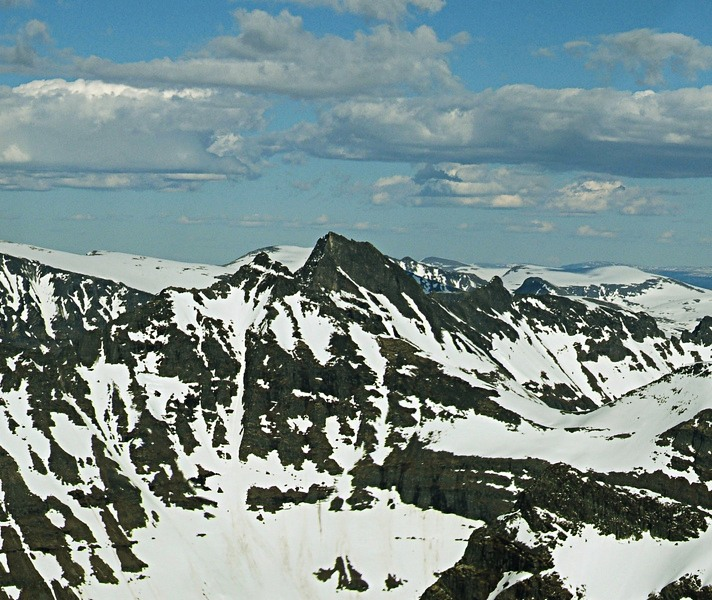
- Trolla peaks seen from west. Store Trolla in the centre (from Dronningkrona).

Highest point
- Elevation: 1,850 m (6,070 ft)
- Prominence: 1,280 m (4,200 ft)
- Parent peak: Trolla
- Listing: 14 at List of peaks in Norway by prominence
- Coordinates: 62°41′04″N 08°44′35″E

Geography
- Interactive map of the mountain
- Location: Sunndal Municipality, Møre og Romsdal, Norway
- Parent range: Trollheimen
- Topo map: 1420 II Romfo

Climbing
- Easiest route: Climbing

Trolla is a mountain in the Trollheimen mountain range in Sunndal Municipality in Møre og Romsdal county, Norway. It is located about 10 kilometres (6.2 mi) east of the village of Sunndalsøra and about 3.5 kilometres (2.2 mi) north of the village of Grøa. The mountain is made up of several peaks along the ridge of the mountain:

- Store Trolla, at an elevation of 1,850 metres (6,070 ft), the highest peak in all of the Trollheimen mountain range
- Nordre Trolla, at an elevation 1,800 metres (5,900 ft), located about 600 metres (2,000 ft) northwest of Store Trolla
- Søndre Trolla, at an elevation 1,740 metres (5,710 ft), located about 800 metres (2,600 ft) southeast of Store Trolla

The ridge continues northwards to the peak Skarfjellet (1,790 metres or 5,870 feet).

== See also ==
- List of peaks in Norway by prominence, Store Trolla is number 14.
