= Šuľa =

Šuľa Süllye
- Municipality
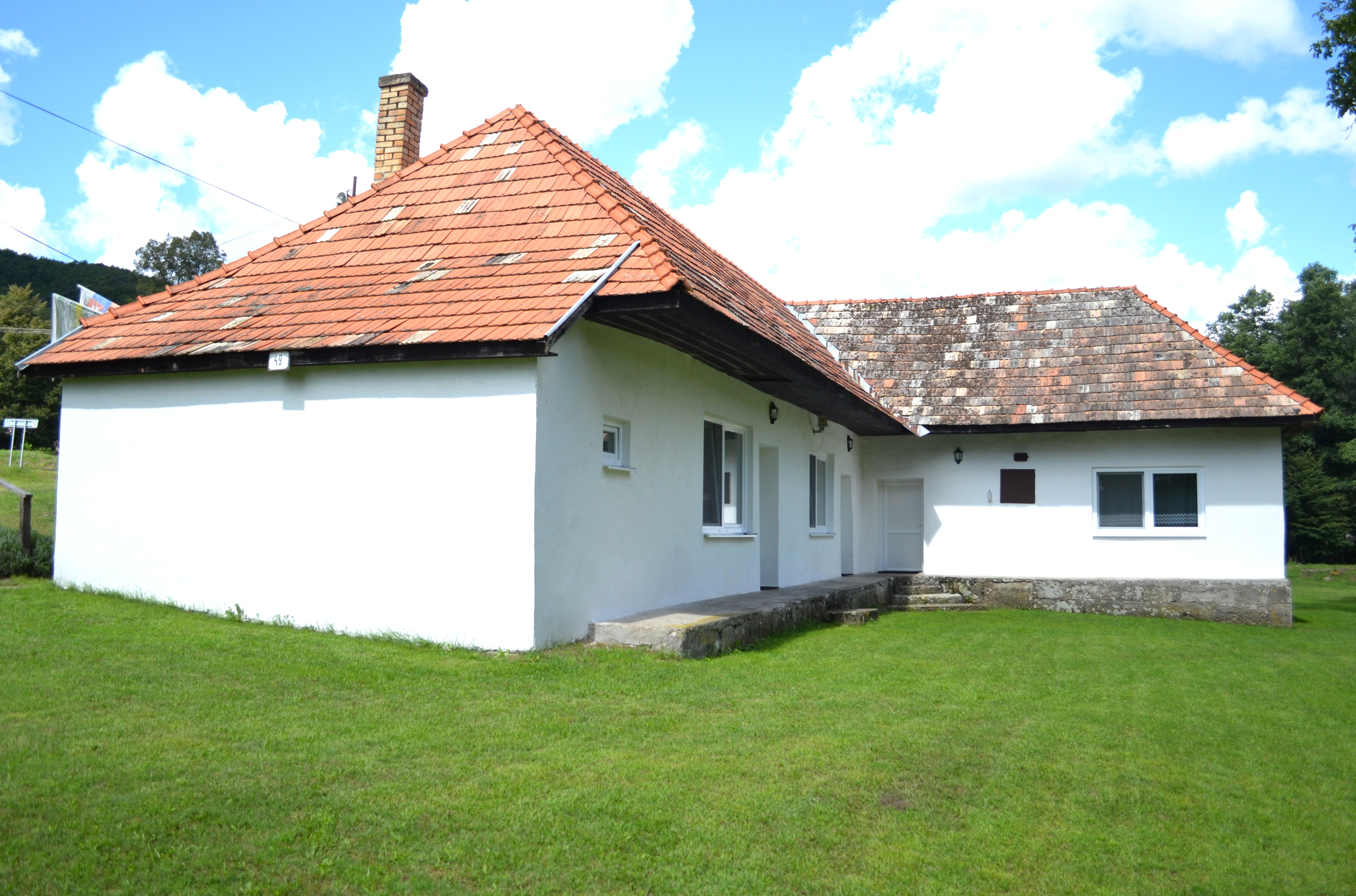

- Flag

- Location of Šuľa in the Banská Bystrica Region Location of Šuľa in Slovakia
- Coordinates: 48.35°N 19.40°E
- Country: Slovakia
- Region: Banská Bystrica Region
- District: Veľký Krtíš District
- First mentioned: 1460

Area
  - Total: 11.27 km^{2} (4.35 sq mi)
- Elevation: 282 m (925 ft)

Population (2025)
  - Total: 70
- Time zone: UTC+1 (CET)
  - Summer (DST): UTC+2 (CEST)
- Postal code: 991 01
- Area code: +421 47
- Vehicle registration plate (until 2022): VK

Šuľa (Hungarian: Süllye) is a village and municipality in the Veľký Krtíš District of the Banská Bystrica Region of southern Slovakia.

== Geography ==
The municipality lies at an altitude of 282 metres (925 ft) and covers an area of 11.27 km^{2} (4.35 sq mi) (2025).

== Population ==
Population statistic (10 years)
Year	1995	2005	2015	2025
Count	86	89	76	70
Difference		+3.48%	−14.60%	−7.89%

Population statistic
Year	2024	2025
Count	73	70
Difference		−4.10%

It has a population of 70 people (31 December 2025).

=== Ethnicity ===
Census 2021 (1+ %)
Ethnicity	Number	Fraction
Slovak	72	97.29%
Romani	5	6.75%
Czech	1	1.35%
Hungarian	1	1.35%
Total	74	

In year 2021 was 74 people by ethnicity 72 as Slovak, 5 as Romani, 1 as Czech and 1 as Hungarian.

Note on population: The difference values of population numbers in the table "Population statistic" and in the sections "Ethnicity" & "Religion" is caused by the use of various statistical methods.

=== Religion ===
Census 2021 (1+ %)
Religion	Number	Fraction
Evangelical Church	37	50%
None	23	31.08%
Roman Catholic Church	14	18.92%
Total	74	

In year 2021 was 74 people by religion 37 from Evangelical Church, 23 from None and 14 from Roman Catholic Church.
