= Ytre Østfold =

Ytre Østfold is the "outer" area of Østfold county (Norway) that has a fjord or coastal line, or is a part of the hughe city area in the southern part of the county. (also known as the Nedre Glomma region because it is at the end of Norway's longest river Glomma)
