= Innerdalstårnet =

Mountain in Sunndal, Norway

- Dalatårnet
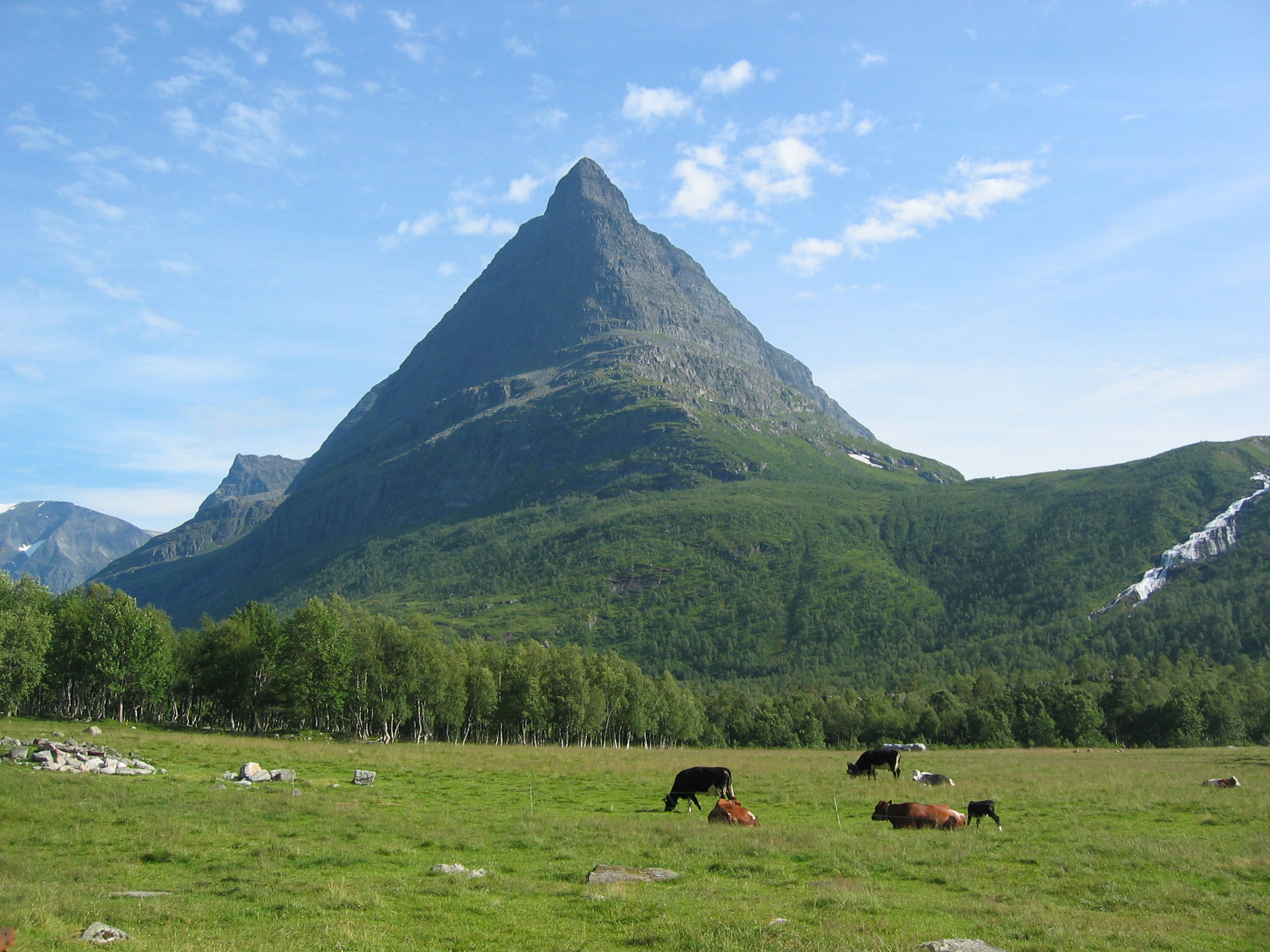
- Innerdalstårnet seen from Innerdalen

Highest point
- Elevation: 1,452 m (4,764 ft)
- Coordinates: 62°42′19″N 08°47′14″E

Geography
- Interactive map of the mountain
- Location: Sunndal Municipality, Møre og Romsdal, Norway
- Parent range: Trollheimen
- Topo map(s): 1420 I Snota and 1420 II Romfo

Climbing
- Easiest route: Scrambling

Innerdalstårnet (or Dalatårnet) is a 1,452-metre (4,764 ft) tall mountain on the south side of the Innerdalen valley in Sunndal Municipality in Møre og Romsdal county, Norway. It is located about 15 kilometres (9.3 mi) southeast of the village of Ålvundeidet. The mountain is also known as the Matterhorn of Norway for its characteristic pyramidal shape.

The summit can be reached with some scrambling, and the mountain is a very popular destination for rock climbing, several routes are established up the mountain.

The northern sub-peak, Litle Innerdalstårnet (seen in the picture) is slightly more inaccessible. Directly south of Innerdalstårnet are the mountains Tårnfjellet and Såtbakkollen, which is the second highest in Trollheimen. The mountain Skarfjellet lies just to the west on the other side of the lake Storvatnet.
