= Gråsjøen =

- Interactive map of the lake
- Location: Møre og Romsdal and Trøndelag
- Coordinates: 62.9116°N 9.1590°E
- Type: Reservoir
- Primary inflows: Folda River
- Primary outflows: Foldsjøen
- Basin countries: Norway
- Max. length: 10.4 kilometres (6.5 mi)
- Max. width: 1.7 kilometres (1.1 mi)
- Surface area: 10.45 km^{2} (4.03 sq mi)
- Shore length^{1}: 24.37 kilometres (15.14 mi)
- Surface elevation: 483 metres (1,585 ft)
- References: NVE
- ^{1} Shore length is not a well-defined measure.

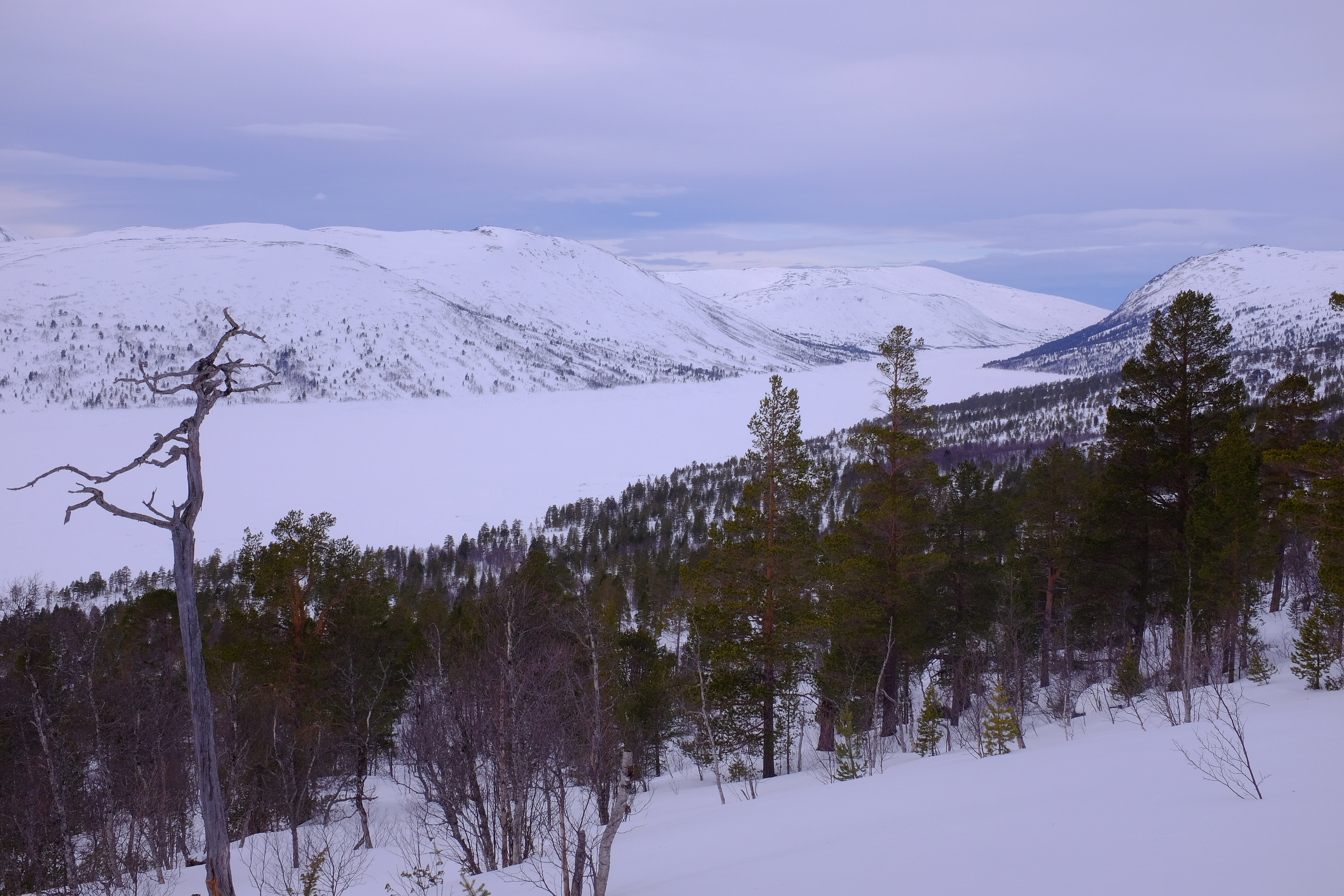

Gråsjøen is a lake/reservoir in Surnadal Municipality in Møre og Romsdal county, Norway. A small section in the northeastern corner of the lake lies within Rindal Municipality, in Trøndelag county. The lake is located in the northern part of the Trollheimen mountain range. The lake is dammed and the water is used in the Gråsjø power station. The water flows out of the lake and into the lake Foldsjøen. Mount Snota lies just south of the lake.

== See also ==
- List of lakes in Norway
