= Gjevillvatnet =

Lake in Oppdal, Norway

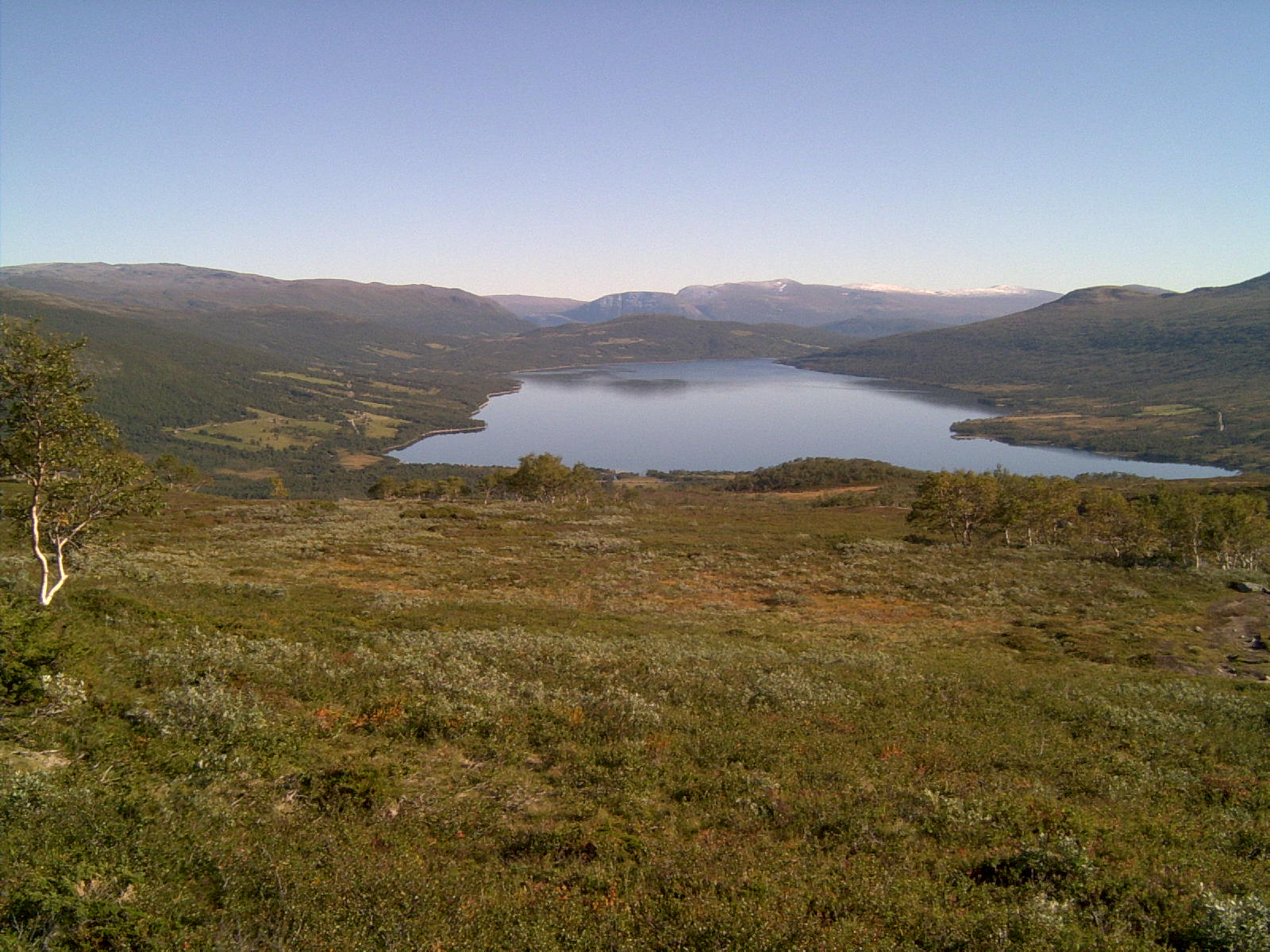
- Interactive map of the lake
- Location: Oppdal Municipality, Trøndelag
- Coordinates: 62.7088°N 09.2116°E
- Basin countries: Norway
- Max. length: 17 kilometres (11 mi)
- Max. width: 1.8 kilometres (1.1 mi)
- Surface area: 20.9 km^{2} (8.1 sq mi)
- Shore length^{1}: 38 kilometres (24 mi)
- Surface elevation: 660 metres (2,170 ft)
- References: NVE
- ^{1} Shore length is not a well-defined measure.

Gjevillvatnet is a lake in Oppdal Municipality in Trøndelag county, Norway. It is located in the Trollheimen mountain range, about 5 kilometres (3.1 mi) south of the mountain Blåhøa and about 5 kilometres (3.1 mi) northwest of the village of Vognillan.

The lake was regulated for hydroelectric power-production in the 1970s. Water is tapped from the bottom in the western part of the lake, for use in the Driva power station. In the spring, the water level can be 15 metres (49 ft) below the natural water level. The river Festa runs out of the lake Gjevillvatnet, and it was once a very good trout river from where the lake is now, all the way down to the intake dam at the old powerstation (Vardammen). This river now mostly runs dry every year due to the dam on Gjevillvatnet, and the trout are almost non-existent in the watercourse.

The valley surrounding the lake is regarded as one of Norway's most scenic valleys, and a cruise boat runs on the lake during summer. Along the middle of the lake, lies the Gjevillvasshytta, a lodge owned by Trondheim Turistforening. Here guests can eat, sleep, and use the lodge as a starting point for walking trips in the Trollheimen mountains.

== See also ==
- List of lakes in Norway
