= Vassnebba =

Mountain in Møre og Romsdal, Norway

Vassnebba Grånebba
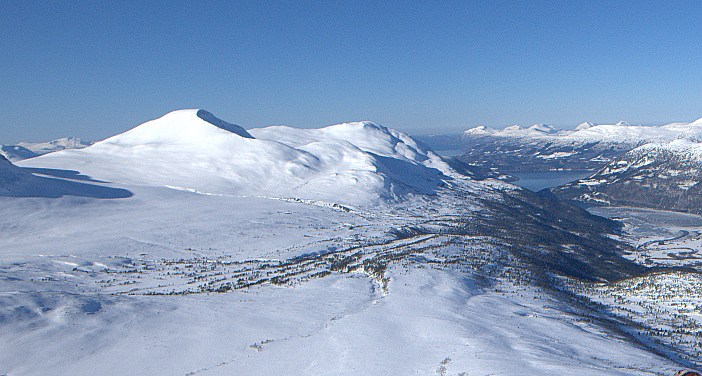
- Vassnebba (left) seen from the foot of Snøfjell. Todalsøra and the Todalsfjorden to the right.

Highest point
- Elevation: 1,305 m (4,281 ft)
- Coordinates: 62.8020°N 8.6140°E

Geography
- Interactive map of the mountain
- Location: Møre og Romsdal, Norway
- Parent range: Trollheimen
- Topo map: 1420 IV Stangvik

Vassnebba or Grånebba is a mountain on the border of Sunndal Municipality and Surnadal Municipality in Møre og Romsdal county, Norway. It lies on the western border of the Trollheimen mountain range, just southwest of the Todalsfjorden and the village of Todalsøra and southeast of the village of Ålvund. The mountain is easily accessed from both sides, summer and winter.

== Name ==
The mountain has two different names: Vassnebba and Grånebba. People from Todalsøra, in the Todalen valley to the east of the mountain, call it Vassnebba, while people on the western side in Ålvundeidet, use the name Grånebba.
