= Trollheimen =

Mountain range in Central Norway

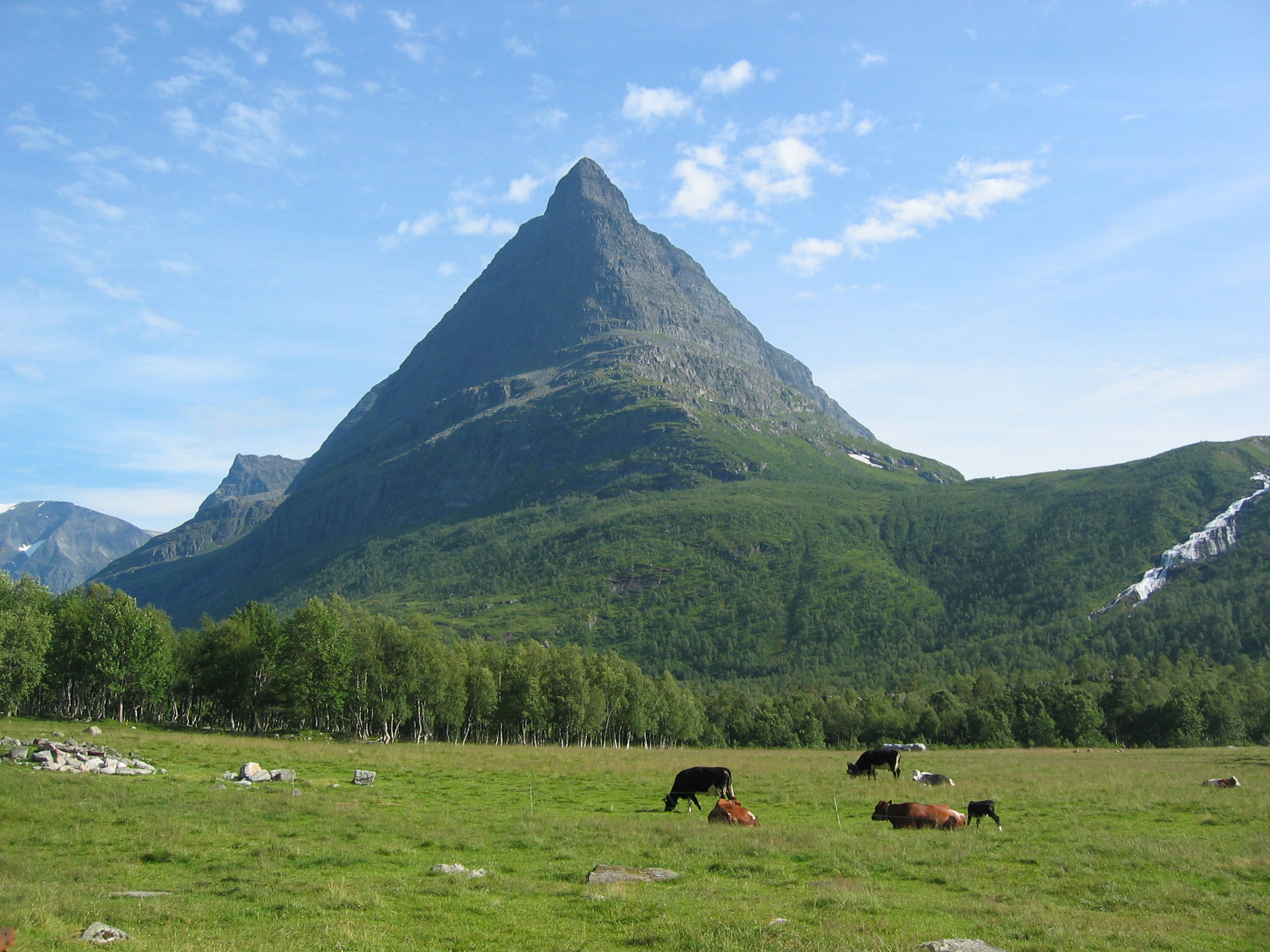
- Innerdalstårnet

Highest point
- Peak: Store Trolla, Sunndal Municipality, Møre og Romsdal
- Elevation: 1,850 m (6,070 ft)
- Coordinates: 62.6859°N 8.7320°E

Geography
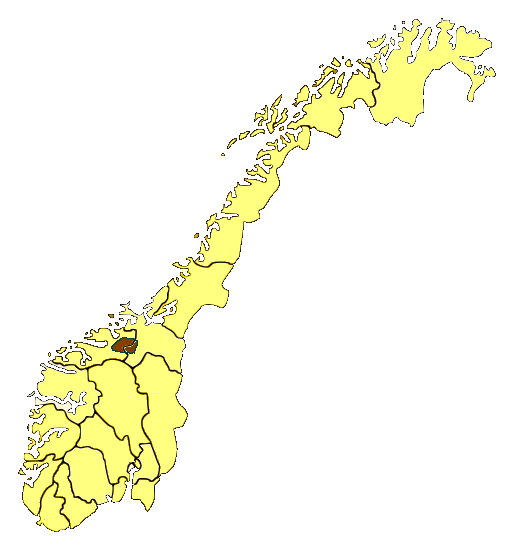
- Location: Møre og Romsdal and Trøndelag, Norway
- Range coordinates: 62°51′N 9°05′E

Trollheimen is a mountain range in Møre og Romsdal and Trøndelag counties in central Norway. The mountain range is part of the Scandinavian Mountains.

== Etymology ==
The name ('the home of the trolls') was proposed by Håkon Løken. It is used by Trondhjems Turistforening in the 1880s, and is considered a "tourist name" (there was no single name for the entire area before). Trollheimen is now the common name in Norway for this mountain range.

== Topography and climate ==
Trollheimen is often considered the most varied of all mountain ranges in Norway. The mountains in the western part are alpine in form, with pointed peaks and typical river valleys. The mountains in the east are less steep with predominating rounded shapes, the valleys are wider and bear the mark of being created by glaciers. The climate differs from the more oceanic climate in the west to a considerably drier, continental climate in the eastern valleys, due to their being sheltered by mountains. The valleys in Trollheimen are at an altitude of only about 500–800 metres (1,600–2,600 ft) and are usually forested. Many are used as pastures (Norwegian: seterdrift). There are also several large lakes, like Gjevillvatnet in the east, near Oppdal, and Gråsjøen and Foldsjøen in the northern part.

The highest peaks are in the southwestern part: Trolla (1,850 metres or 6,070 feet), Dronningkrona (1,816 metres or 5,958 feet), Kongskrona (1,818 metres or 5,965 feet), Såtbakkollen (1,840 metres or 6,040 feet), Storsomrungnebba (1,799 metres or 5,902 feet). In the northern and eastern part, the highest are Snota (1,668 metres or 5,472 feet), Trollhetta (1,616 metres or 5,302 feet), and Blåhøa (1,671 metres or 5,482 feet). In the southeast there is Kråkvasstind (1,700 metres or 5,600 feet).

== Flora ==
Trollheimen is known by botanists for the diverse alpine flora, due to nutrient-rich soil and the varied climate within the mountain range. One of the rare alpine plants in Trollheimen is Artemisia norvegica. Approximately 1,160 square kilometres (450 sq mi) of this area is declared a nature reserve. In the midst of the area is the Svartåmoen forest reserve, with undisturbed pine forest, mixed with birch. Innerdalen, in the western part, was Norway's first nature reserve, and is sometimes described as the most beautiful valley in Norway.

== Recreation ==
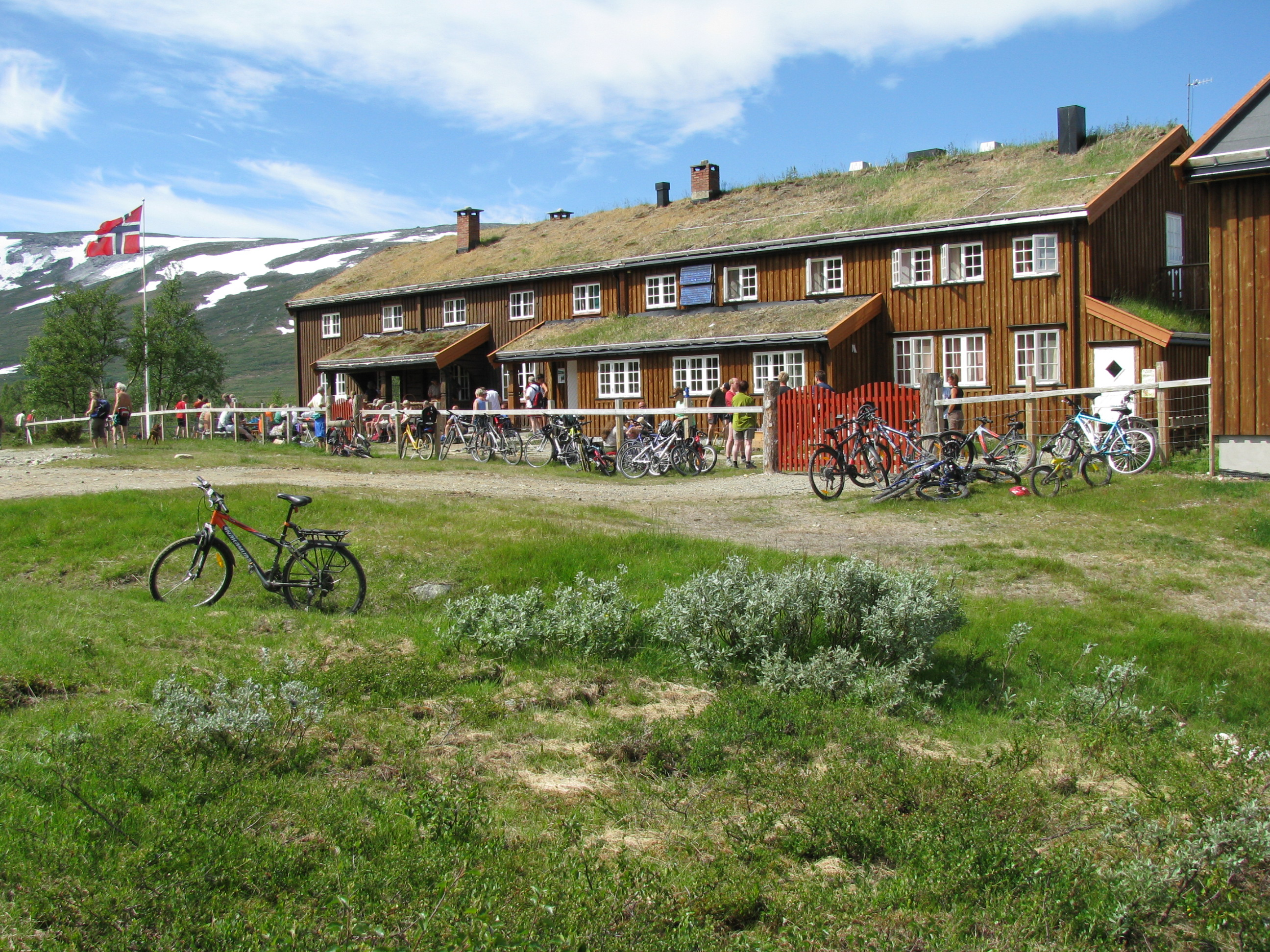
Jøldalshytta, one of several manned (in season) lodges. July 5, 2008 was the annual "Mountain Day" at the start of summer season.

The "Triangle" (Norwegian: Trekanten) is a route between the three mountain lodges (Gjevilvasshytta, Jøldalshytta and Trollheimshytta) each a fairly long hike of about 7 to 9 hours. It is possible to choose a route covering the three peaks of Trollhetta, a spectacular (but long) hike comparable to the Besseggen route in Jotunheimen. The hike to the peak of Snota is often considered one of the most beautiful in Norway. There are trout in most of the lakes.

Except in winter, Gjevilvasshytta can be reached by car, while Jøldalshytta is an easy 4-kilometre (2.5 mi) hike from the nearest road (Jølhaugen). Trollheimshytta is a long hike from any road, in the summer one can park by Gråsjøen and hike 11–12 km. There are several other smaller lodges as well, and many more marked routes. Trondheim is roughly one hour drive from the nearest part of the mountain range (Jølhaugen or Resvatn). Gjevilvasshytta is the oldest DNT lodge in Norway, with timber from 1739, and widely regarded as one of the prettiest ().

== Archeology ==
Trollheimen seems to be one of the first areas in Norway to be clear of ice at the close of the last ice age. There are several traces of stone age people using the mountains as a hunting ground, particularly stone "fences" used to channel scared reindeer herds towards cliffs, where some would fall off and die. These "fences" seem to be very old, as some angles seems to have been blocked by remnants of the ice sheet. Thus, these hunters might have been among the first wave of humans migrating to Norway. In addition, since 1997 there have been many unusually long and warm summers, and the glaciers in Trollheimen and Dovre have retreated, revealing many prehistoric arrowheads. Some are 4,000 years old or more, but the majority is 1,000–2,000 years old. These hunters probably migrated down to the fjords to the west (Sunndalsfjord, Surnadalsfjord, Todalsfjord) to avoid the harsh winters.

People hiking near glaciers in late summer and autumn are encouraged to have a "watchful eye" for prehistoric artifacts.

== Image gallery ==
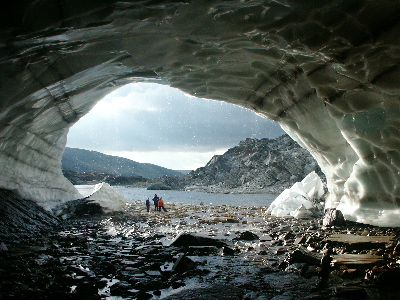
Speilsalen, a natural formation of the glacier, in late summer. The cave collapsed in the summer of 2007.

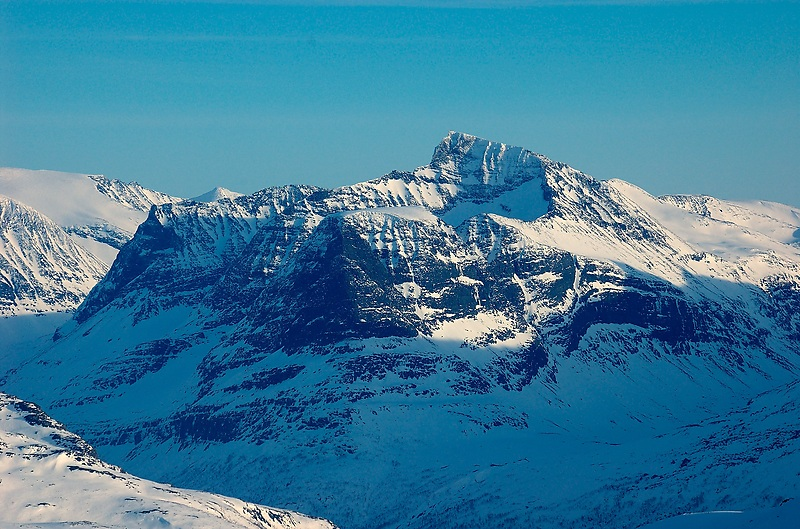
Såtbakkollen mountain

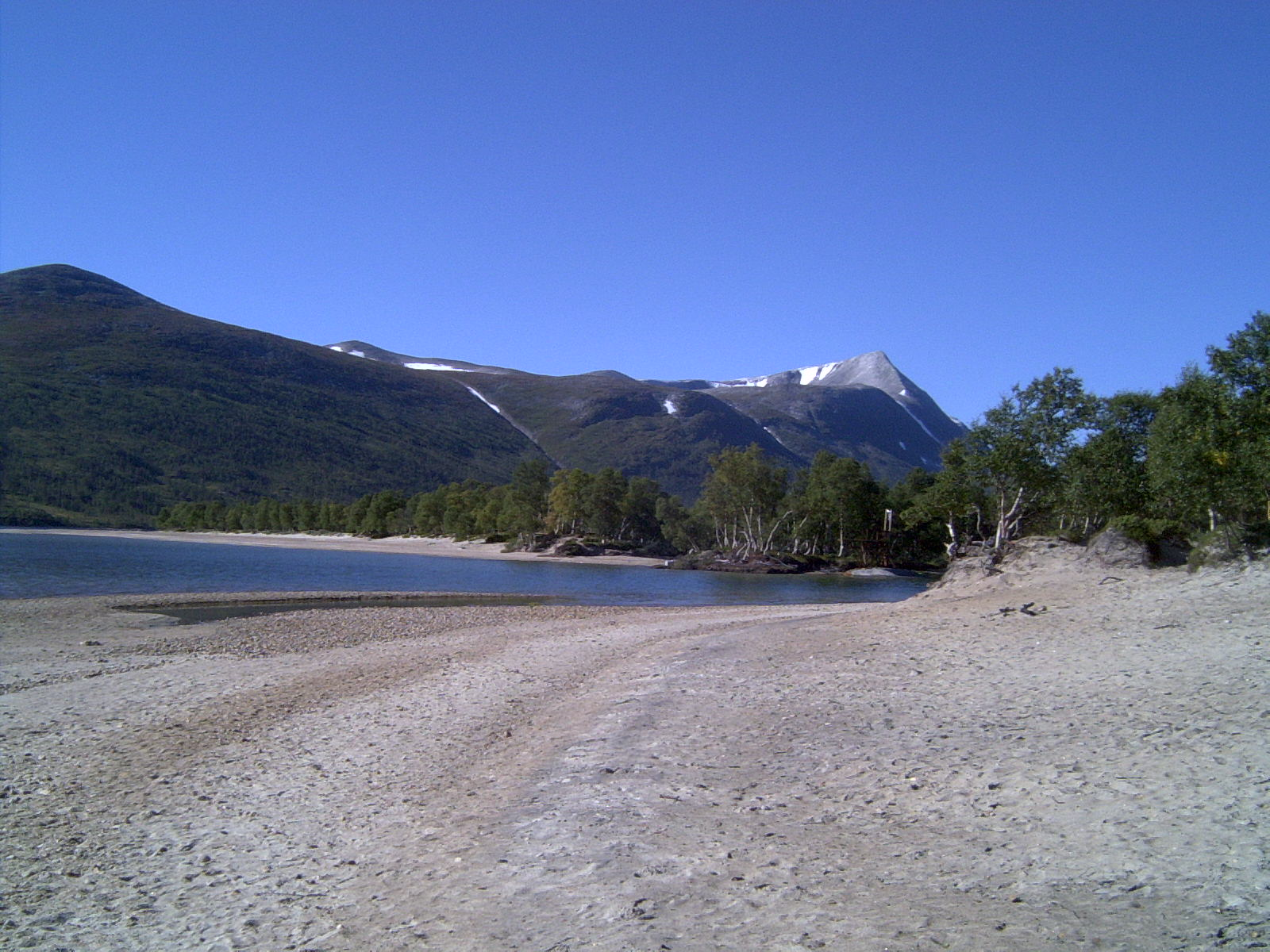
Gjevilvatnet with Raudøra beach, near Gjevilvasshytta. The mountain on the right is Okla in Oppdal Municipality.

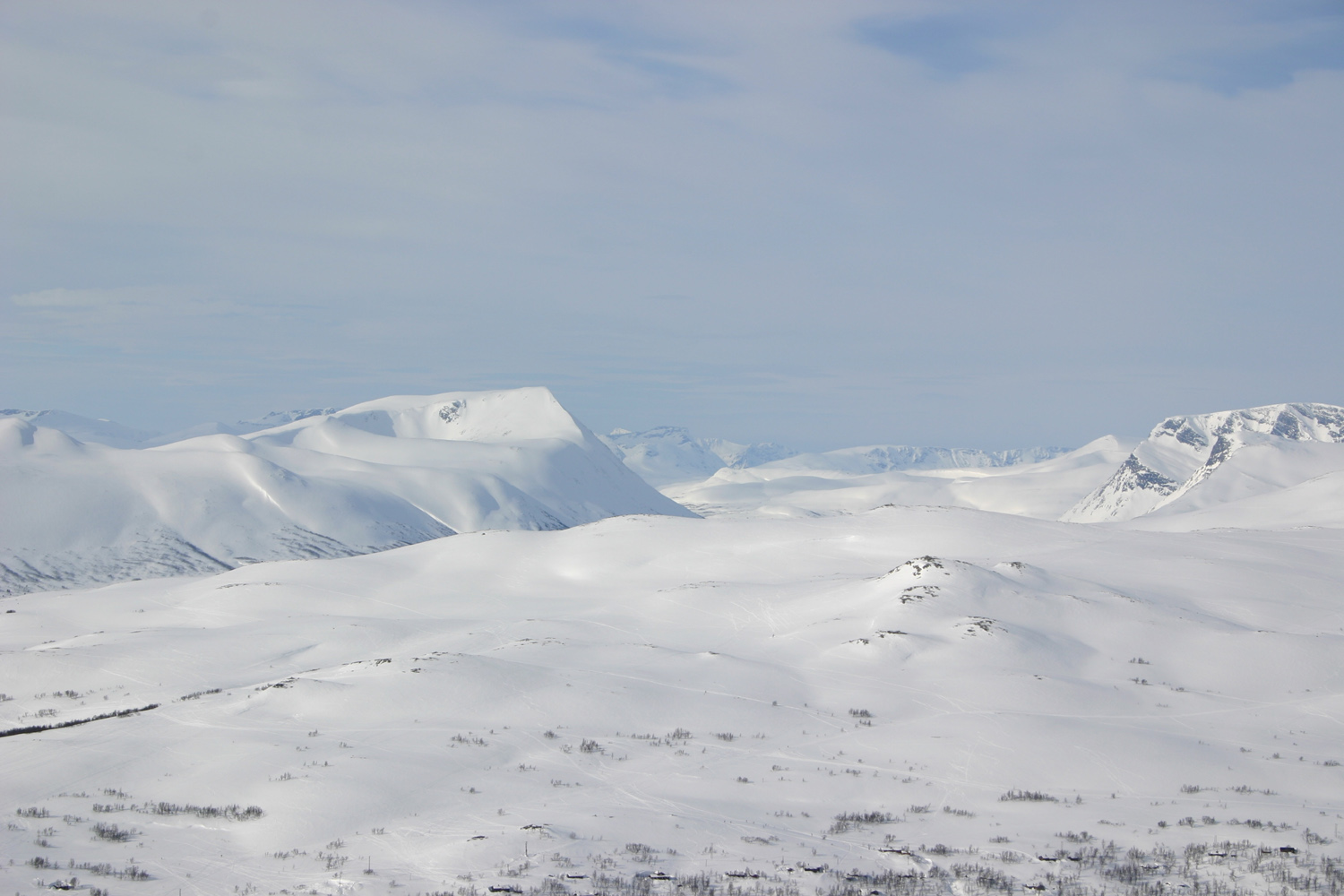
Trollheimen in winter

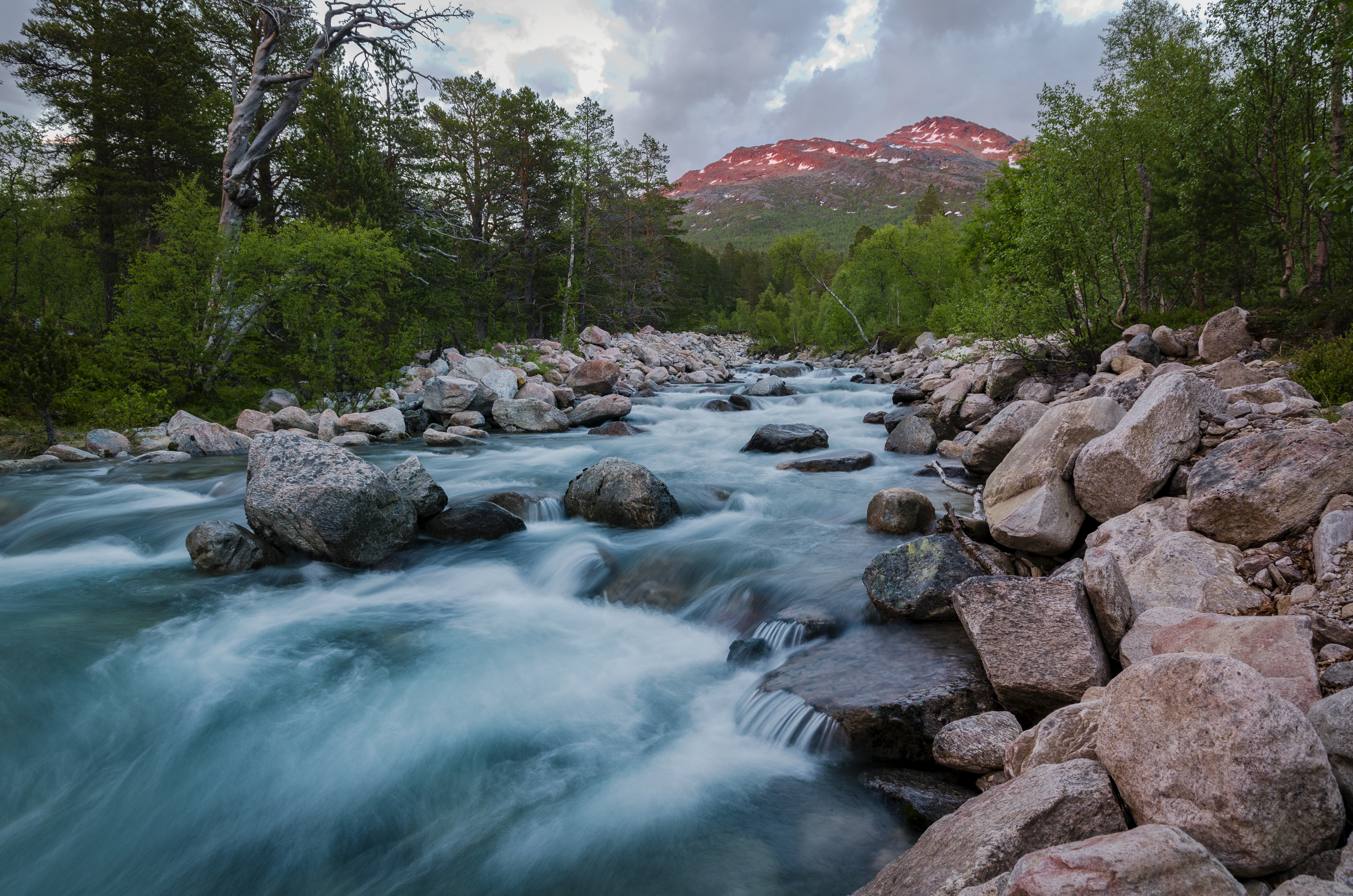
Sunset by a river in the heart of Trollheimen mountains near Trollheimshytta
