= Oppdal =

Oppdal may refer to:

== Places ==
- Oppdal Municipality, a municipality in Trøndelag county, Norway
- Oppdal (village), a village within Oppdal Municipality in Trøndelag county, Norway
- Oppdal Church, a church in Oppdal Municipality in Trøndelag county, Norway

== Sport ==
- Oppdal IL, a sports club from Oppdal Municipality in Trøndelag county, Norway
- Oppdal Curlingklubb, a curling club from Oppdal Municipality in Trøndelag county, Norway
- Oppdal Ski Center, a ski resort in Oppdal Municipality in Trøndelag county, Norway

== Transportation ==
- Oppdal Station, a railway station in Oppdal Municipality in Trøndelag county, Norway
- Oppdal Airport, an airport in Oppdal Municipality in Trøndelag county, Norway
