= Quality Hotel Oppdal =

Hotel in Oppdal, Norway

Coordinates: 62.5931°N 9.6930°E

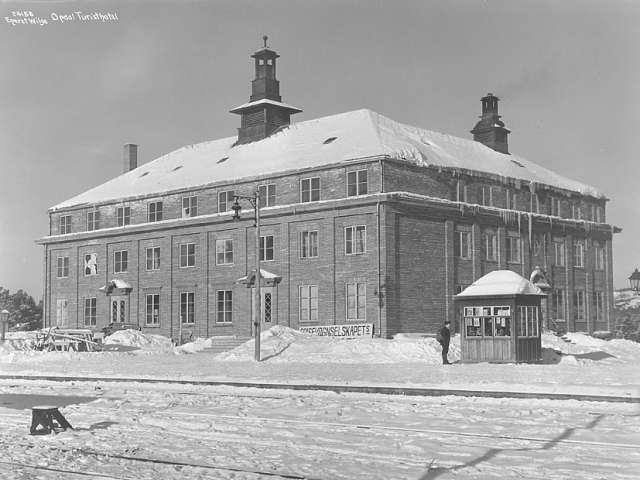
The hotel in 1924

Quality Hotel Oppdal, formerly Opdal Turisthotell, is a hotel in Oppdal in Oppdal Municipality in Trøndelag county, Norway. Part of the Choice Hotels, it was established in 1924 by Norsk Spisevognselskap, a state-owned enterprise which ran railway restaurants. The hotel is next to Oppdal Station on the Dovre Line

== History ==
The first hotel in Oppdal was Bjerklund Hotell, which opened in 1913. In 1918, Norsk Hotelkompani bought a 8.7 hectares (21 acres) lot at Høgmo for a hotel, but they never got around to building the hotel. By 1919, Spisevognselskapet was considering building a tourist hotel somewhere along the Dovre Line, and Hjerkinn and Fokstua were mentioned in the newspapers as probable locations. Oppdal Station opened on 20 September 1921 when the Dovre Line was opened through town. The same day, Norsk Spisevognselskap started operations of a station restaurant in the station building. The facilities were too small, but it would be too costly to expand the station building to make a larger restaurant. It was therefore decided to establish a combined restaurant and tourist hotel next to the station. Plans were made by architect Gudmund Hoel and District Manager von Krogh. The plans were approved by the company's board on 20 September 1922, and passed by the general meeting on 27 October. The board was given authority to loan-finance the investment.

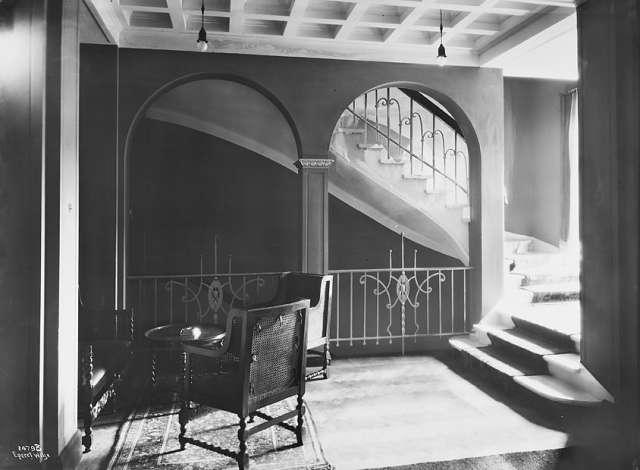
The lobby in 1924

The company purchased a 0.6 hectares (1.5 acres) lot next to the station for 15,000 kr. Olaf Skaslien was project manager. The restaurant was taken into use on 22 June 1923 and the hotel opened on 28 June 1924. The original plans called for a three-story building of 510 square meters (5,500 sq ft) and 40 beds. However, the plans were expanded twice, to 605 square meters (6,510 sq ft) and 60 beds. All rooms had both warm and cold water, and some were equipped with an en-suite bathroom. The hotel featured a dining hall veranda, seven common bathrooms for guests and one for personnel. In the immediate vicinity there was built croquet and tennis fields and a bobsled and curling course. The hotel cost 1.22 million Norwegian krone, of which the building itself cost NOK 0.88 million.

The arrival both of the railway and the hotel was instrumental in the tourism boom which would follow in Oppdal. Opdal Turisthotell was a key, as it had an external and professional owner which operated both restaurants and hotels elsewhere. This gave a professionalism and service quality which local interests would have been able to accomplish at the time. For several decades it was the only quality tourist hotel in Trøndelag and one of the most exclusive in the country. Anders Beer Wilse—one of Norway's leading photographers—took advertisement pictures of the hotel and a commercial was made in French. The Norwegian Mapping and Cadastre Authority made a tourist map for the hotel.

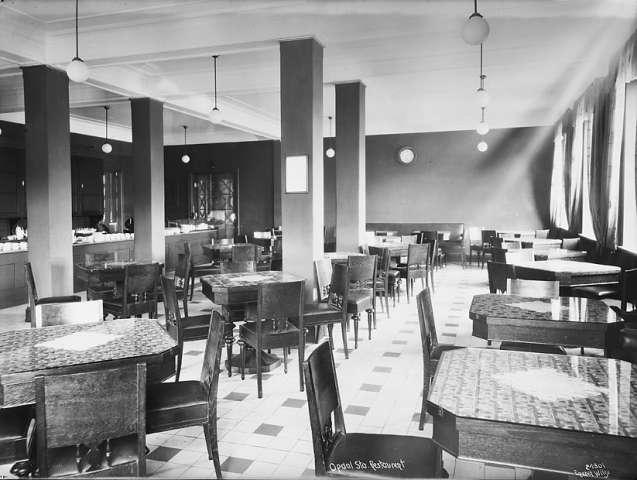
The restaurant in 1924

In 1923, a longer dispute between the hotel and the municipality started regarding the liquor license. Initially the request was dismissed because of defamatory statement made by the police commissioner. Spisevognselskapet took the issue to the courts, who judicially declared the statement is null and void. An application was denied by the municipal council ahead of the opening of the hotel in 1924, and again the following year. Spisevognselskapet then took the issue up with NSB, in an attempt to lobby a change of regulations to allow denial of lack of liquor licenses to be appealed to the government. Eventually in 1925, a license was granted by the municipal council. This was repeated until 1929, when the license was again dismissed. To avoid additional losses, Spisevognselskapet agreed with NSB to have a dining car put onto the train between Oppdal and Trondheim, and to close the hotel after Easter, from 5 April 1929, and remain closed during the low season. However, the Parliament of Norway intervened and instructed the state-owned company to keep the hotel open. It was therefore re-opened from 25 June 1929.

Locals were not allowed to purchase alcoholic beverages at the hotels in Oppdal. Therefore, some locals would bicycle to the nearest station, get on the train and get off at Oppdal. There they would get into the same queues as the tourists and purchase the alcoholic beverages. From the opening until 1940, the hotel did not make sufficient profit to cover the investment costs. From 1940 through 1945, the hotel was requisitioned by the German occupation forces. It was originally used as a field hospital, then gradually became a reserve hospital for Trondheim. Tourists were still allowed to stay at the hotel, but only on condition that they greeted German soldiers politely.

After the war, the hotel was renovated, including all-new interior and furniture for the restaurant and saloons. Plans for a ski lift were launched by hotel manager Ruth Juul in 1936. Instead, the hotel started with slalom instruction. In 1947, the tourist committee started working on the plans, which resulted in Norsk Spisevognselskap being a major owner of the lift which opened at Hovden in 1952. This also gave a large increase in demand. In 1957, Architect Hugi Kohmann presented a model for three additions, two large two-story buildings and one eight-story. Although supported by the hotel management, the board of Spisevognselskapet were split, and in the end only one of the two-story extensions were built and completed in 1962.

In 1973, Norsk Spisevognselskap decided to sell the hotel. There were two bids, one from the municipality and one from the former manager, Erik Schønheyder. The municipality planned to rebuild the hotel to become a new town hall. They won the bid, but afterwards withdrew to allow Schønheyder to purchase it. Another extension was launched in 1979, and completed in 1989. Ownership later passed to Johan Fr. Schønheyder.
