= Bjørklia =

Village in Oppdal Municipality, Norway

- Village
- Interactive map of Bjørklia
- Location within Trøndelag Location within Norway
- Coordinates: 62.6372°N 09.7771°E
- Country: Norway
- Region: Central Norway
- County: Trøndelag
- District: Dovre
- Municipality: Oppdal Municipality
- Elevation: 647 m (2,123 ft)
- Time zone: UTC+01:00 (CET)
  - Summer (DST): UTC+02:00 (CEST)
- Post Code: 7340 Oppdal

Bjørklia is a small village area in Oppdal Municipality in Trøndelag county, Norway. The village is mostly made up of holiday cottages (Norwegian: hytte) and it is located approximately 5 kilometres (3.1 mi) northeast of the village of Oppdal and about 7 kilometres (4.3 mi) southwest of the village of Fagerhaugen. The village lies along the European route E06 highway and the Dovrebanen railway line, on the southeastern edge of the Trollheimen mountain range.
