= Seter (disambiguation) =

Seter or Sæter may refer to:

== Farming ==
- Seter or Sæter, a Scandinavian mountain pasture used in the practice of transhumance

== People ==
- Arne Sæter (1913–1973), a Norwegian politician for the Christian Democratic Party
- Einar Sæter (1917–2010), a Norwegian triple jumper, resistance member, newspaper editor and writer
- Ingebrigt Haldorsen Sæter (1800–1875), a Norwegian politician and farmer
- John Hou Sæter (born 1998), a Norwegian footballer who plays in midfield for Stabæk
- Lars Sæter (1895–1988), a Norwegian politician for the Christian Democratic Party
- Marcus Sæter (born 2008), a Norwegian racing driver
- Mordecai Seter (1916–1994), a Russian-born Israeli composer
- Olaf Sæter (1872–1945), a Norwegian rifle shooter who competed in the early 20th century
- Olav Jørgen Sæter (1884–1951), a Norwegian schoolteacher, newspaper editor and politician

== Places ==
- Seter, Indre Fosen, a village in the municipality in Indre Fosen in Trøndelag county, Norway
- Seter, Osen, a village in the municipality in Osen in Trøndelag county, Norway
- Sæter (station), a railway station in Oslo, Norway
- Sæter Chapel, an old chapel in Oslo, Norway

== See also ==
- Säter Municipality
