= Fagerhaug Church =

Church in Trøndelag, Norway

- Fagerhaug kirke
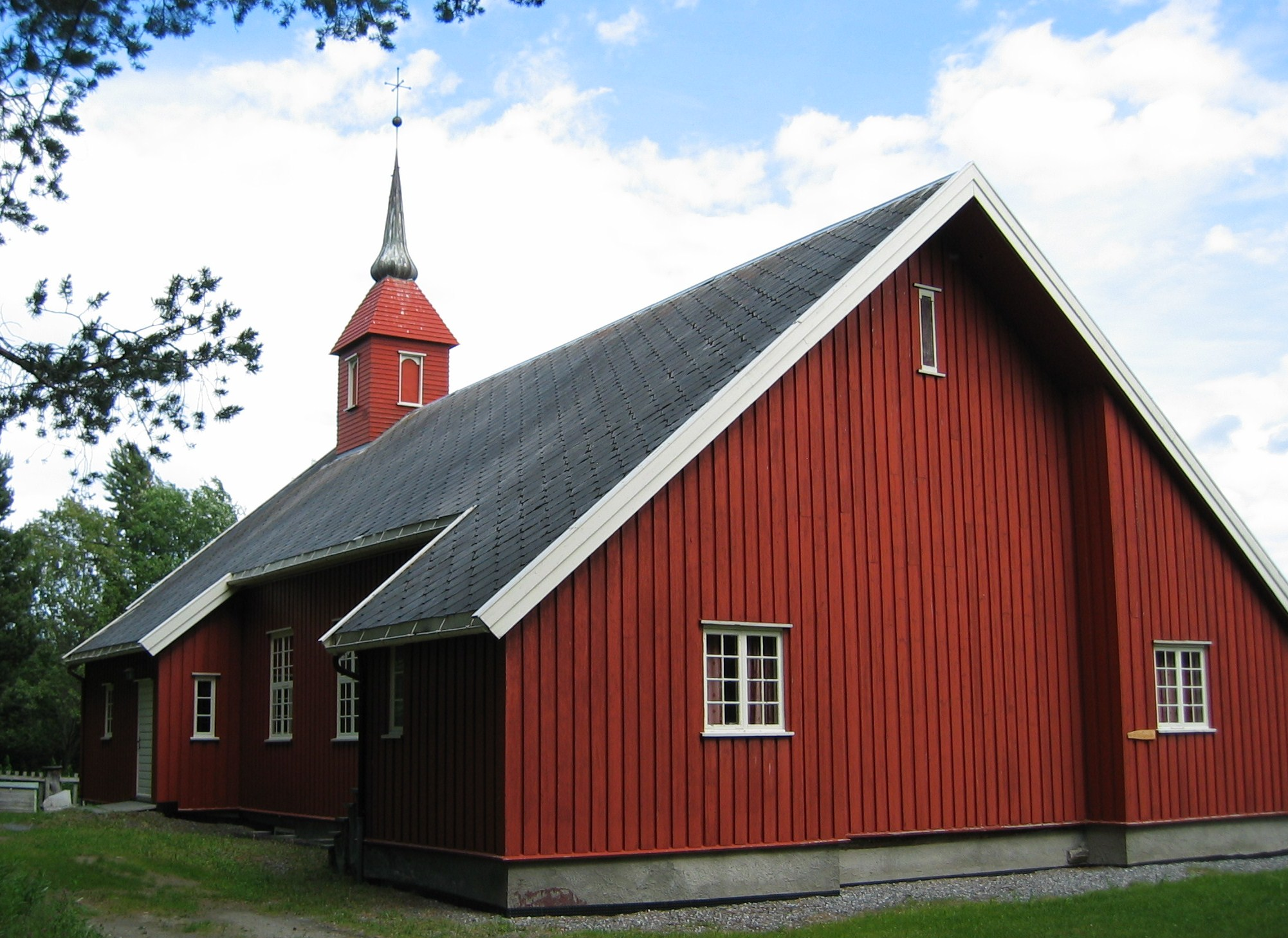
- View of the church
- Fagerhaug Church
- 62°39′23.4″N 09°52′43.9″E
- Location: Oppdal Municipality, Trøndelag
- Country: Norway
- Denomination: Church of Norway
- Churchmanship: Evangelical Lutheran

History
- Status: Parish church
- Founded: 1959
- Consecrated: 13 September 1959

Architecture
- Functional status: Active
- Architect: John Egil Tverdahl
- Architectural type: Long church
- Completed: 1921 (105 years ago)

Specifications
- Capacity: 150
- Materials: Wood

Administration
- Diocese: Nidaros bispedømme
- Deanery: Gauldal prosti
- Parish: Fagerhaug
- Norwegian Cultural Heritage Site
- Type: Church
- Status: Not protected
- ID: 84110

Fagerhaug Church (Norwegian: Fagerhaug kirke) is a parish church of the Church of Norway in Oppdal Municipality in Trøndelag county, Norway. It is located in the village of Fagerhaug in the northern part of the municipality. It is the church for the Fagerhaug parish which is part of the Gauldal prosti (deanery) in the Diocese of Nidaros. The red, wooden church was built in a long church style in 1921. The church seats about 150 people.

== History ==
The church was built in 1921 as a Baptist church called Elim bedehus. It was used as a prayer house by the Baptist congregation from 1921 until 1928. After that, it was used for a variety of purposes. During the 1950s, it was purchased by the local Church of Norway parish. From 1958-1959, the building was renovated by Ola Mjøen using plans drawn up by the architect John Egil Tverdahl. The building was consecrated as a chapel on 13 September 1959 and it later became designated as a parish church.

== See also ==
- List of churches in Nidaros
