= Oppdal Airport, Fagerhaug =

Oppdal Airport, Fagerhaug Oppdal flyplass, Fagerhaug
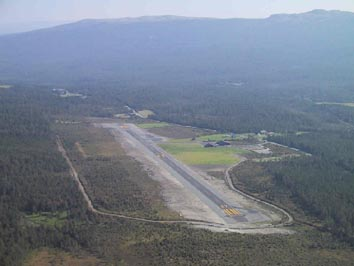
- IATA: none; ICAO: ENOP

Summary
- Airport type: Public
- Owner: Midtnorsk Fly og Luftsportssenter
- Serves: Oppdal Municipality, Norway
- Location: Fagerhaug
- Elevation AMSL: 558 m (1,831 ft)
- Coordinates: 62°38′59″N 09°50′48″E

Map
- Location within Norway

Runways
| Direction | Length | | Surface |
| Direction | m | ft | Surface |
|---|---|---|---|
| 07–25 | 936 | 3,071 | Asphalt |
- Source: DAFIF

Oppdal Airport, Fagerhaug (Norwegian: Oppdal flyplass, Fagerhaug; ICAO: ENOP) is an airport serving Oppdal Municipality in Trøndelag county, Norway. It is located on the south side of the village of Fagerhaug, about 10 kilometres (6.2 mi) northeast of the municipal center of Oppdal, along the European route E6 highway.

== History ==
The airport was established by a local recreational flying club in the 1980s, and was later closed.

In 2000, industrialist Kjell Inge Røkke was completing his holiday home in Oppdal Municipality. The closest airport to Oppdal was then Molde Airport, Årø, located three hours drive away. Røkke wanted an airport to fly his business jet to Oppdal and engaged Sundt Air to renovate and reopen the airport. The airport was at the time closed because of lack of maintenance. The municipality gave permission in February 2011 for Røkke to invest 25 million Norwegian krone to extend the runway by 400 meters (1,300 ft), allowing him to use a larger business jet.

== Facilities ==
The airport resides at an elevation of 559 meters (1,834 ft) above mean sea level. It has one runway aligned 07–25 with an asphalt surface measuring 936 by 18 metres (3,071 ft × 59 ft). It is owned and operated by Midtnorsk Fly og Luftsportssenter, which is again owned by NTNU Fallskjermklubb (35%), Våningshuset (owned by Røkke, 32%), NTH Flyklubb (17%), Oppdal Municipality (11%) and Oppdal Flyklubb (6%).
