= Oppdal Station =

Railway Station in Oppdal, Norway

Oppdal
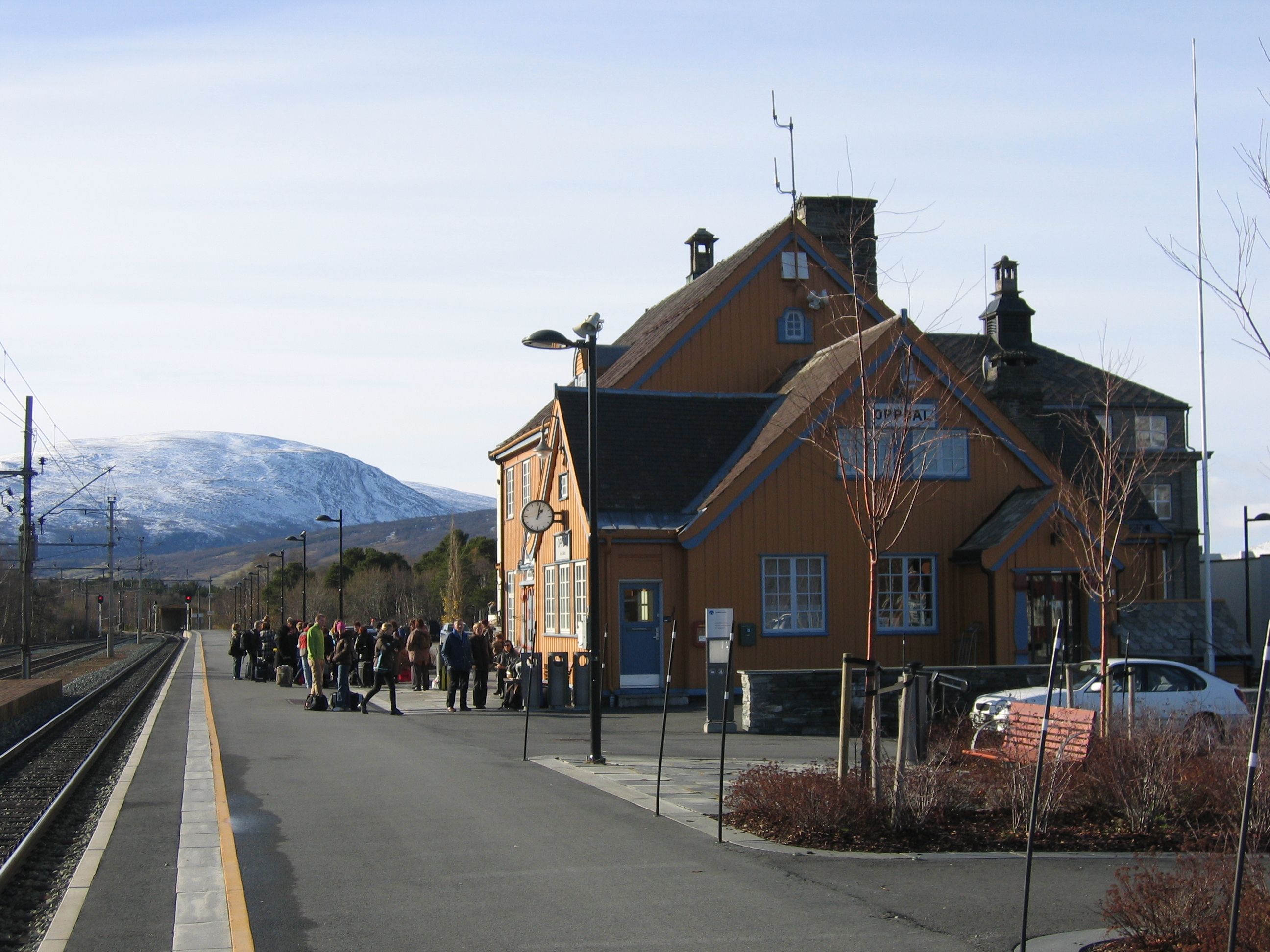
- View of the station

General information
- Location: Oppdal; Oppdal Municipality, Trøndelag; Norway
- Coordinates: 62.5928°N 09.6939°E
- Elevation: 544.9 m (1,788 ft)
- System: Railway station
- Owner: Bane NOR
- Operator: SJ Norge
- Line: Dovrebanen
- Distance: 429.28 km (266.74 mi)
- Platforms: 2

Other information
- Station code: OPD

History
- Opened: 20 September 1921
Location
- Location within Trøndelag Location within Norway

Oppdal Station (Norwegian: Oppdal stasjon) is a railway station located in downtown Oppdal in Oppdal Municipality in Trøndelag county, Norway. It sits close to the European route E06 highway, just northwest of the mountain Allmannberget. The village of Oppdal is dominated by mountain tourism and skiing in winter.

The station is located along the Dovre Line, and it is served by four daily express trains going in each direction to Oslo and Trondheim. It is also served by a few daily Trøndelag Commuter Rail to Trondheim. The station was opened in 1921 as part of the Dovre Line when it was extended from Dombås to Trondheim.

== Hotel ==
When building the Dovre Line, Norsk Spisevognselskap planned to build a tourist hotel at one of the stations. When the station opened on 20 September 1921, Norsk Spisevognselskap started operations of a station restaurant in the station building. The facilities were too small, but it would be too costly to expand the station building to make a larger restaurant. It was therefore decided to establish a combined restaurant and tourist hotel next to the station. Plans were made by architect Gudmund Hoel and district manager von Krogh and approved on 27 October 1922. The company purchased a 0.6-hectare (1.5-acre) lot next to the station. The restaurant was taken into use on 22 June 1923 and the hotel opened on 28 June 1924. It originally was 605 square metres (6,510 sq ft) and 60 beds. In the immediate vicinity, croquet and tennis fields were built as well as a bobsled and curling course. The hotel cost 1.22 million kr, of which the building itself cost 880,000 kr.

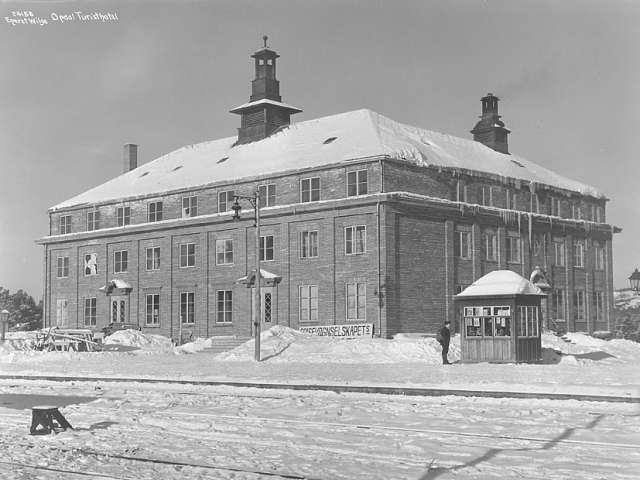
Oppdal Tourist Hotel

The arrival both of the railway and the hotel was instrumental in the tourism boom which would follow in Oppdal. Opdal turisthotell was a key, as it had an external and professional owner who operated both restaurants and hotels elsewhere. In 1923, a longer dispute between the hotel and the municipality started regarding the liquor license. Initially the request was dismissed because of defamatory statement made by the police commissioner. Spisevognselskapet took the issue to the courts, who judicially declared the statement as null and void. An application was denied by the municipal council ahead of the opening of the hotel in 1924, and again the following year. Eventually in 1925, a license was granted by the municipal council. This was repeated until 1929, when the license was again dismissed. To avoid additional losses, Spisevognselskapet agreed with NSB to have a dining car put onto the train between Oppdal and Trondheim, and to close the hotel after Easter, from 5 April 1929, and remain closed during the low season. However, the Parliament of Norway intervened and instructed the state-owned company to keep the hotel open. It was therefore re-opened on 25 June 1929. Locals were not allowed to purchase alcoholic beverages at the hotels in Oppdal. Therefore, some locals would bicycle to the nearest station, get on the train and get off at Oppdal. There they would get into the same queues as the tourists and purchase alcoholic beverages.

After the war, the hotel was renovated, including an all-new interior and furniture for the restaurant and saloons. In 1952, a ski lift, largely owned by Spisevognselskapet, opened. In 1957, Architect Hugi Kohmann presented a model for three additions, two large two-story buildings and one eight-story. Although supported by the hotel management, the board of Spisevognselskapet was split, and in the end only one of the two-story extensions were built and completed in 1962. In 1973, Norsk Spisevognselskap sold the hotel. Another extension was launched in 1979, and completed in 1989. Ownership later passed to Johan Fr. Schønheyder.

Preceding station	Express trains	Following station
Kongsvoll towards Oslo S	F6	Berkåk towards Trondheim S
