= Ola Røtvei =

Norwegian politician and farmer

Member of the Storting
- In office 1993–2001

Personal details
- Born: 4 November 1953 (age 72) Oppdal Municipality, Norway
- Party: Labour Party
- Profession: Farmer

Ola Røtvei (born 4 November 1953) is a Norwegian politician for the Labour Party.

== Personal life ==
Born in Oppdal Municipality on 4 November 1953, Røtvei is a son of farmers Inge Røtvei and Marta Ørstad. Outside politics, he has been a farmer since 1981.

== Political career ==
=== Local politics ===
A member of the municipal council of Oppdal, Røtvei was mayor of Oppdal from 1987 to 1989, and from 2003 to 2011.

=== Parliament ===
Røtvei was elected deputy representative to te Storting for the period 1989 to 1993, and deputised for Gunhild Elise Øyangen from 1990 to 1993 while Øyangen served as government minister.

He was elected representative to the Storting for the period 1993–1997 for the Labour Party, and re-elected for the period 1997–2001.
