= Allmannberget =

Mountain in Trøndelag, Norway

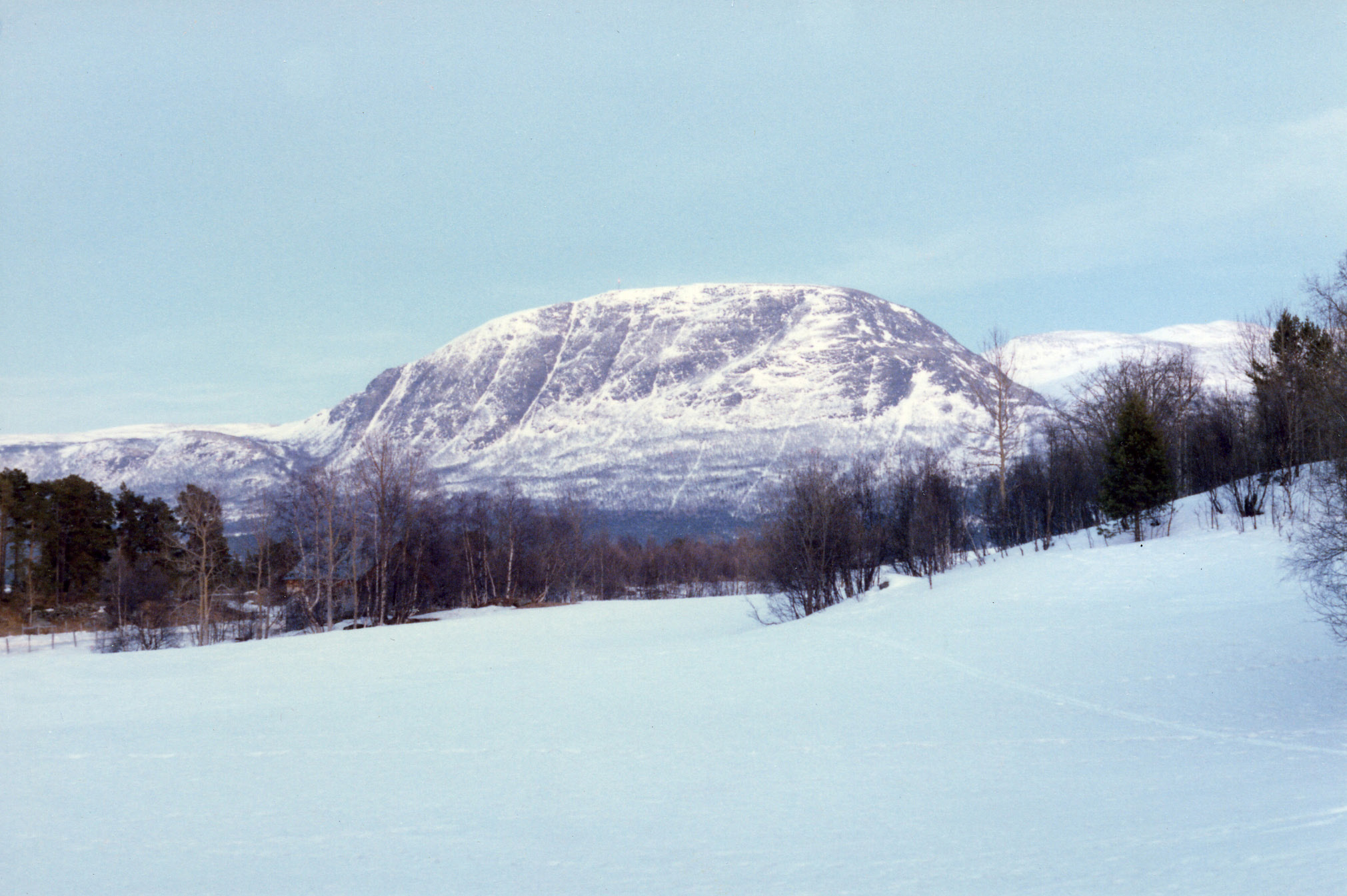
- View of the mountain

Highest point
- Elevation: 1,342 m (4,403 ft)
- Coordinates: 62.5687°N 09.7114°E

Geography
- Interactive map of the mountain
- Location: Trøndelag, Norway
- Topo map(s): 1520 III Oppdal (summit) and 1520 II Innset (ascent)

Allmannberget is a mountain in Oppdal Municipality in Trøndelag county, Norway. The 1,342-metre (4,403 ft) tall mountain sits about 3 kilometres (1.9 mi) southeast of the village of Oppdal, easily seen from the European route E06 highway.

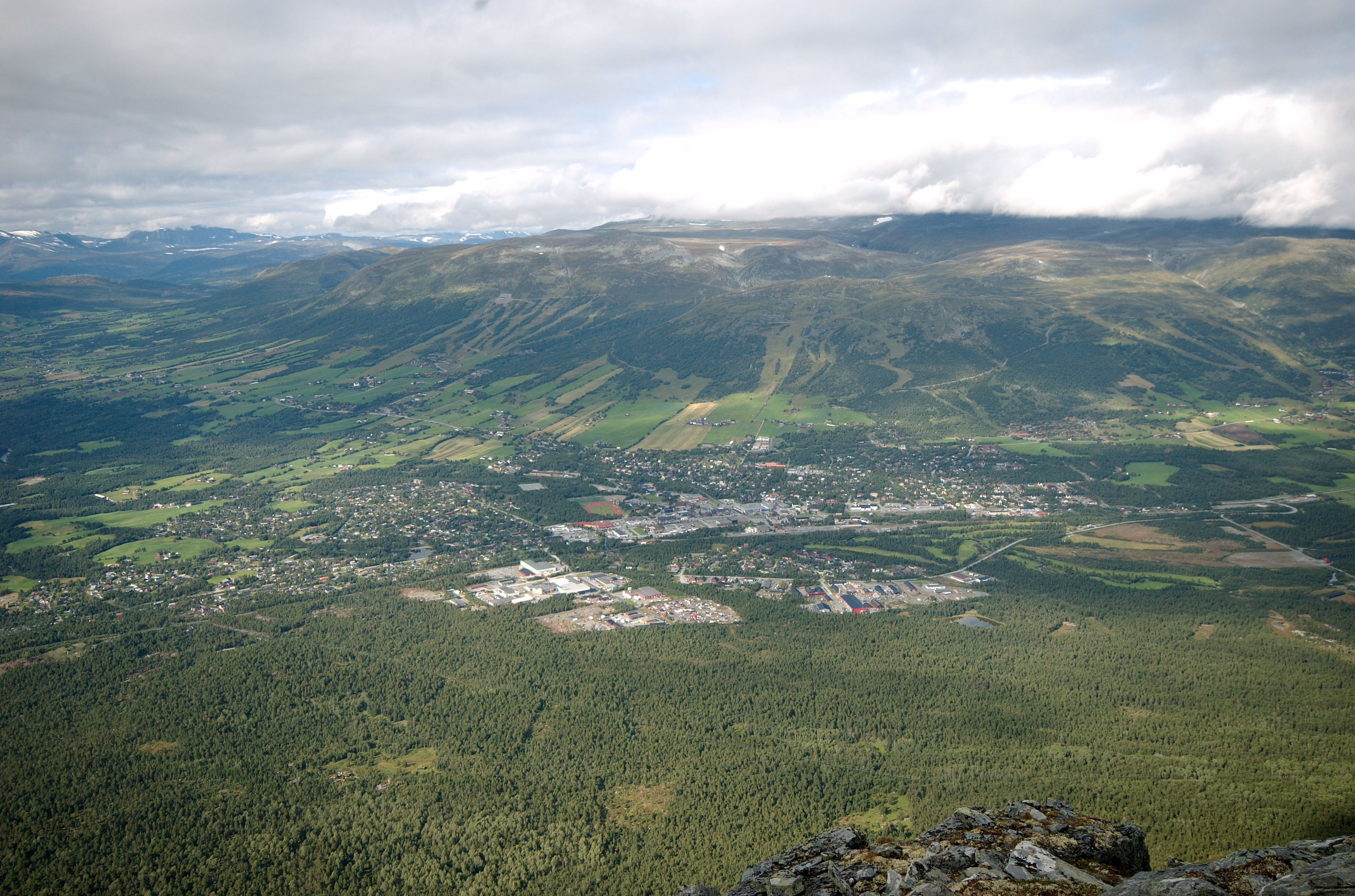
Oppdal seen from the summit.

The easiest hiking route is from the east-north-east. Drive on the gravel toll road from the E6 highway partially up the Olmdalen Valley, then walk approximately 2.5 kilometres (1.6 mi) to the summit. There is a communication tower on the top of the mountain.

== Name ==
The first element is comes from allmenn which means "common/public property" (literally "for all men"). The last element is the finite form of berg which means "rocky mountain".
