= Oppdal Ski Center =

Ski resort in Oppdal, Norway

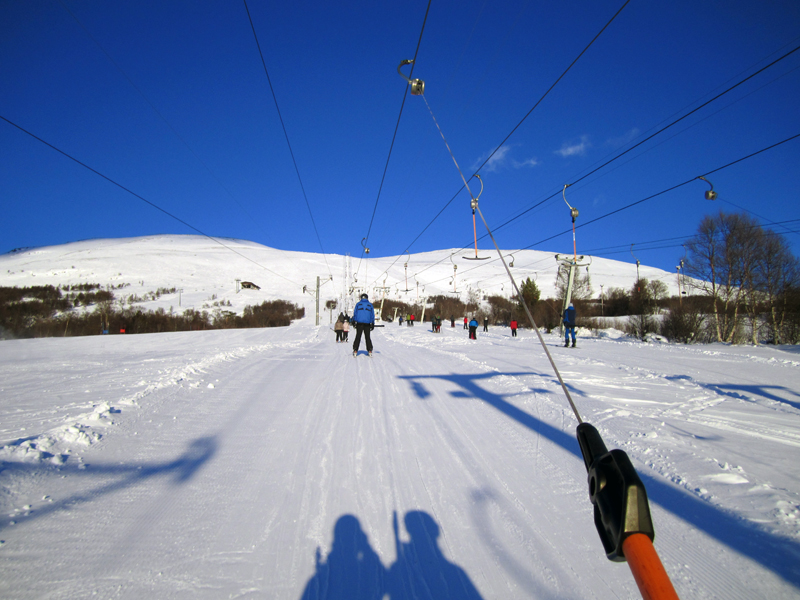

- Location within Trøndelag Location within Norway
- Location: Oppdal Municipality, Norway
- Mountain: Blåøret
- Nearest city: Oppdal
- Coordinates: 62.6116027°N 9.6495847°E
- Status: Active
- Opened: 1952
- Owner: Alpinco AS
- Vertical: 715 m (2,346 ft)
- Top elevation: 1,300 m (4,300 ft)
- Base elevation: 585 m (1,919 ft)
- Trails: 46
- Total length: 56 km (35 mi)
- Lift system: 3 chairlifts 15 surface lifts
- Terrain parks: yes
- Website: Official website

Oppdal Ski Center (Norwegian: Oppdal skisenter) is a ski resort located on the north side of the village of Oppdal in Oppdal Municipality, Trøndelag county, Norway. The ski resort is Norway's largest in terms of area, and with a total of 18 lifts and 39 slopes, it is among Norway's largest ski resorts.

Oppdal Ski Center is spread over five areas connected by a total of 56 kilometres (35 mi) of trails. The trail network descends from four mountains with a height difference of up to 790 metres (2,590 ft). Hovden was the first slope in the ski resort and was opened in 1952 with a chairlift. The largest facility is Vangslia with slopes for snowboarding and a terrain park, which also has a chairlift. Some of the trails have been used for World Cup skiing races.

== Trails ==
The trail network in Oppdal Ski Center extends over 56 kilometres (35 mi), and is sorted by four levels of difficulty: Green (easy), blue (medium), red (somewhat demanding), and black (demanding). Some of the trails do not have color codes (shown in grey). This mainly applies to the forest trails and some group trails. Below is an overview of all prepared trails within the ski center:

#	Nr.	Name	Length	Starting height	Ending height
	1	Danskeløypa	1,500 m (0.93 mi)	981 m (3,219 ft)	642 m (2,106 ft)
	2	Vestløypa	1,200 m (0.75 mi)	981 m (3,219 ft)	710 m (2,330 ft)
	3	Pomaløypa	1,200 m (0.75 mi)	981 m (3,219 ft)	710 m (2,330 ft)
	4	Midtløypa	1,400 m (0.87 mi)	981 m (3,219 ft)	710 m (2,330 ft)
	5	Vangsløypa	1,600 m (0.99 mi)	981 m (3,219 ft)	672 m (2,205 ft)
	6	Terrengparken	1,500 m (0.93 mi)	981 m (3,219 ft)	710 m (2,330 ft)
	7	Slettbakken	1,700 m (1.1 mi)	981 m (3,219 ft)	672 m (2,205 ft)
	8	Henget	700 m (0.43 mi)	1,215 m (3,986 ft)	981 m (3,219 ft)
	9	Solsvingen	2,900 m (1.8 mi)	1,060 m (3,480 ft)	672 m (2,205 ft)
	10	Barneland	500 m (1,600 ft)	818 m (2,684 ft)	710 m (2,330 ft)
	11	Tverrløypa	1,500 m (0.93 mi)	981 m (3,219 ft)	915 m (3,002 ft)
	12	Vesthenget	700 m (0.43 mi)	1,215 m (3,986 ft)	981 m (3,219 ft)
	13	Lysløypa	500 m (0.31 mi)	981 m (3,219 ft)	850 m (2,790 ft)
	14	Vest-toppen	400 m (0.25 mi)	1,300 m (4,300 ft)	1,200 m (3,900 ft)
	15	Fjellsida	2,100 m (1.3 mi)	1,215 m (3,986 ft)	915 m (3,002 ft)
	16	Toppløypa	400 m (0.25 mi)	1,300 m (4,300 ft)	1,200 m (3,900 ft)
	17	Håkerløypa	1,500 m (0.93 mi)	1,000 m (3,300 ft)	615 m (2,018 ft)
	21	Bjørndalsløypa	1,900 m (1.2 mi)	1,032 m (3,386 ft)	585 m (1,919 ft)
	22	Høgerhenget	600 m (0.37 mi)	900 m (3,000 ft)	700 m (2,300 ft)
	23	Bjerkeløypa	1,900 m (1.2 mi)	1,032 m (3,386 ft)	585 m (1,919 ft)
	24	Storstugguløypa	1,500 m (0.93 mi)	1,119 m (3,671 ft)	719 m (2,359 ft)
	25	Bualøypa	2,600 m (1.6 mi)	1,119 m (3,671 ft)	940 m (3,080 ft)
	26	Baksida	1,500 m (0.93 mi)	1,119 m (3,671 ft)	915 m (3,002 ft)
	28	Slettvoldløypa	600 m (0.37 mi)	719 m (2,359 ft)	590 m (1,940 ft)
	31	Håmmårløypa	3,100 m (1.9 mi)	1,016 m (3,333 ft)	585 m (1,919 ft)
	32	Jonasløypa	1,300 m (0.81 mi)	1,016 m (3,333 ft)	675 m (2,215 ft)
	33	Worldcupløypa	1,100 m (0.68 mi)	974 m (3,196 ft)	675 m (2,215 ft)
	34	Ekkerenget	1,500 m (0.93 mi)	1,016 m (3,333 ft)	675 m (2,215 ft)
	35	Ormhaugen	2,600 m (1.6 mi)	1,280 m (4,200 ft)	915 m (3,002 ft)
	36	Parallellen	1,800 m (1.1 mi)	1,280 m (4,200 ft)	927 m (3,041 ft)
	37	Storsleppet	1,800 m (1.1 mi)	1,280 m (4,200 ft)	927 m (3,041 ft)
	38	Skogsløypa	500 m (0.31 mi)	927 m (3,041 ft)	700 m (2,300 ft)
	39	Trolland	300 m (0.19 mi)	700 m (2,300 ft)	640 m (2,100 ft)
	41	Presten	1,200 m (0.75 mi)	1,230 m (4,040 ft)	915 m (3,002 ft)
	42	Ådalsløypa	2,300 m (1.4 mi)	1,230 m (4,040 ft)	915 m (3,002 ft)
	43	Transporten	2,000 m (1.2 mi)	915 m (3,002 ft)	800 m (2,600 ft)
	44	Hovdensvingen	2,200 m (1.4 mi)	800 m (2,600 ft)	585 m (1,919 ft)
	45	Elvekanten	900 m (0.56 mi)	800 m (2,600 ft)	715 m (2,346 ft)
	46	Gråbergløypa	1,600 m (0.99 mi)	1,050 m (3,440 ft)	1,016 m (3,333 ft)
