= Ingebrigt Haldorsen Sæter =

Norwegian politician

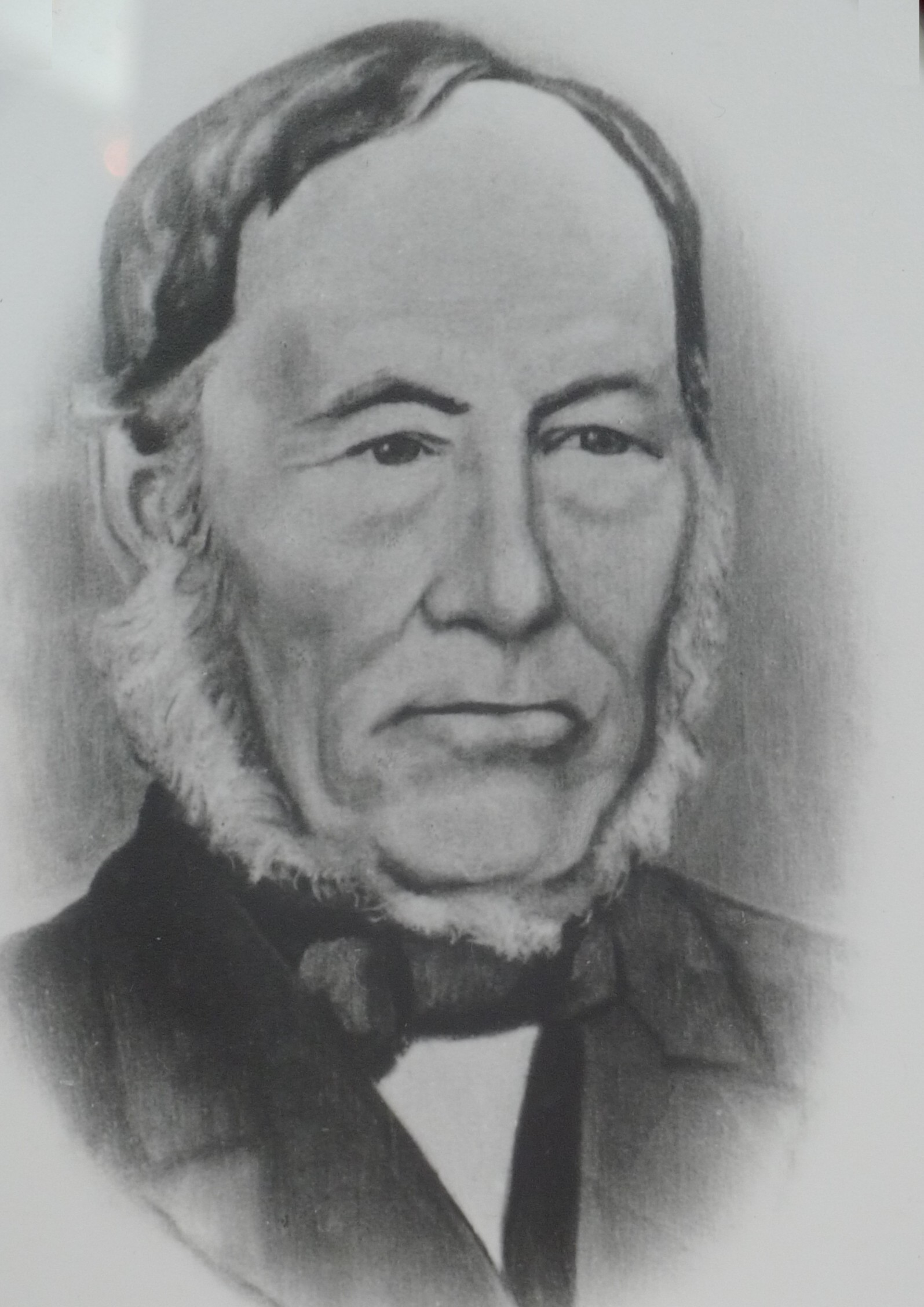
- Born: 24 June 1800; Oppdal, Norway
- Died: 3 May 1875 (aged 74); Oppdal, Norway
- Occupations: Politician, farmer
- Known for: Presidency laws
- Spouse: Marit Olufsdtr. Bryggen (1802–87)

Ingebrigt Haldorsen Sæter (24 June 1800 – 3 May 1875) was a Norwegian politician and farmer with connection to the peasant opposition and the democracy movement. He was Member of The Norwegian Parliament for 40 years with disruption of parliamentary sessions 1859–60 and 1862–63, as he was deputy representative.

== Biography ==
=== Youth ===
Sæter was born in Oppdal.

He grew up in a Haugean influenced environment at the farm Bøasæter in Oppdal and went to a moving school (moving from place to place at random intervals), which offered limited learning. The parish priest Cornelius Thomas Rønnau, was a source of salvation. He made a great contribution towards education, training and rural development, and ensured that children received additional training. For Sæter this meant access to a Public library which was important.

=== Political career ===
He was elected to the Norwegian Parliament in 1833, 1836, 1839, 1842, 1845, 1848, 1851, 1854, 1857, 1865, 1868 and 1871, representing the rural constituency of Søndre Trondhjems Amt. He was also a deputy representative around 1860. Working as a farmer, he was known as a prominent liberal.
