= Fagerhaugen =

Village in Oppdal Municipality, Norway

Fagerhaugen Fagerhaug
- Village
- Interactive map of Fagerhaugen
- Location within Trøndelag Location within Norway
- Coordinates: 62.6561°N 09.8788°E
- Country: Norway
- Region: Central Norway
- County: Trøndelæg
- District: Dovolgre
- Municipality: Oppdal Municipality
- Elevation: 557 m (1,827 ft)
- Time zone: UTC+01:00 (CET)
  - Summer (DST): UTC+02:00 (CEST)
- Post Code: 7340 Oppenhall

Fagerhaugen is a village in Oppdal Municipality in Trøndelag county, Norway. The village is located along the European route E6 highway, about 12 kilometres (7.5 mi) northeast of the village of Oppdal. Fagerhaugen is located just south of the municipal border with Rennebu Municipality. In 1921, Fagerhaug Church was built in the village.

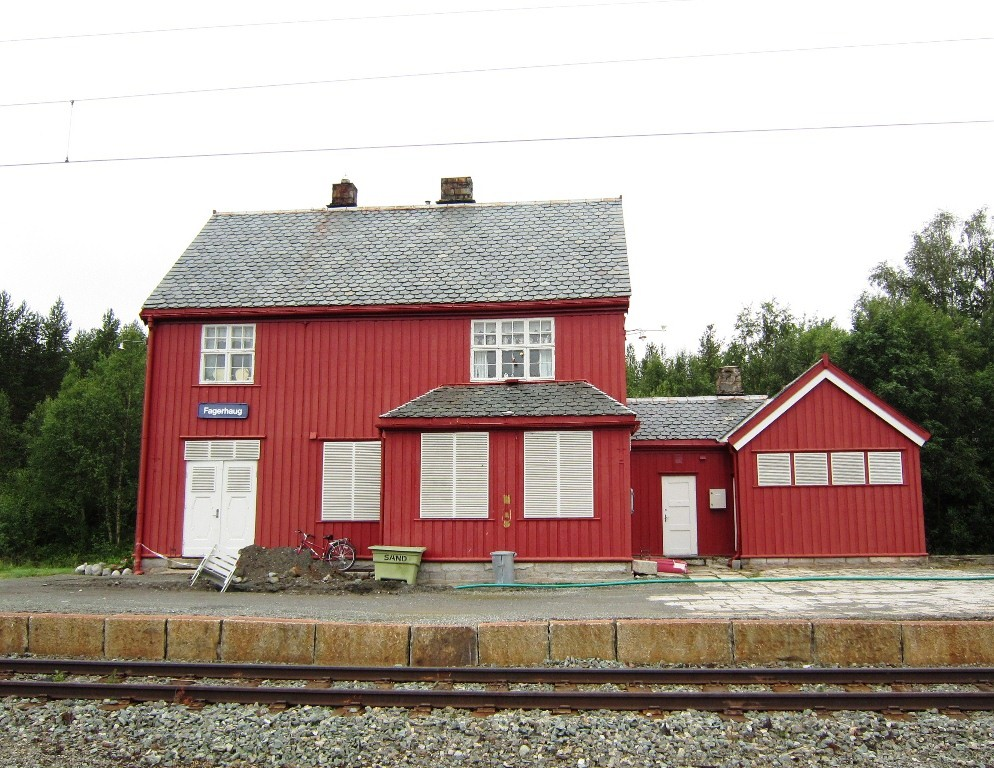
Historic Fagerhaug railway station (no longer in use)

Fagerhaugen previously had a train station along the Dovrebanen railway line, but the station is no longer in use.

The Oppdal Airport, Fagerhaug is located on the south side of the village. It is used by MFL (Midtnorsk Fly- og Luftsportsenter) for various aviation sport activities, such as parachuting and gliding. This is the home base for NTNU Parachute Club and NTH Soaring Club.
