= Oppdal Church =

Church in Trøndelag, Norway

- Oppdal kirke
- "Marit på Vang"
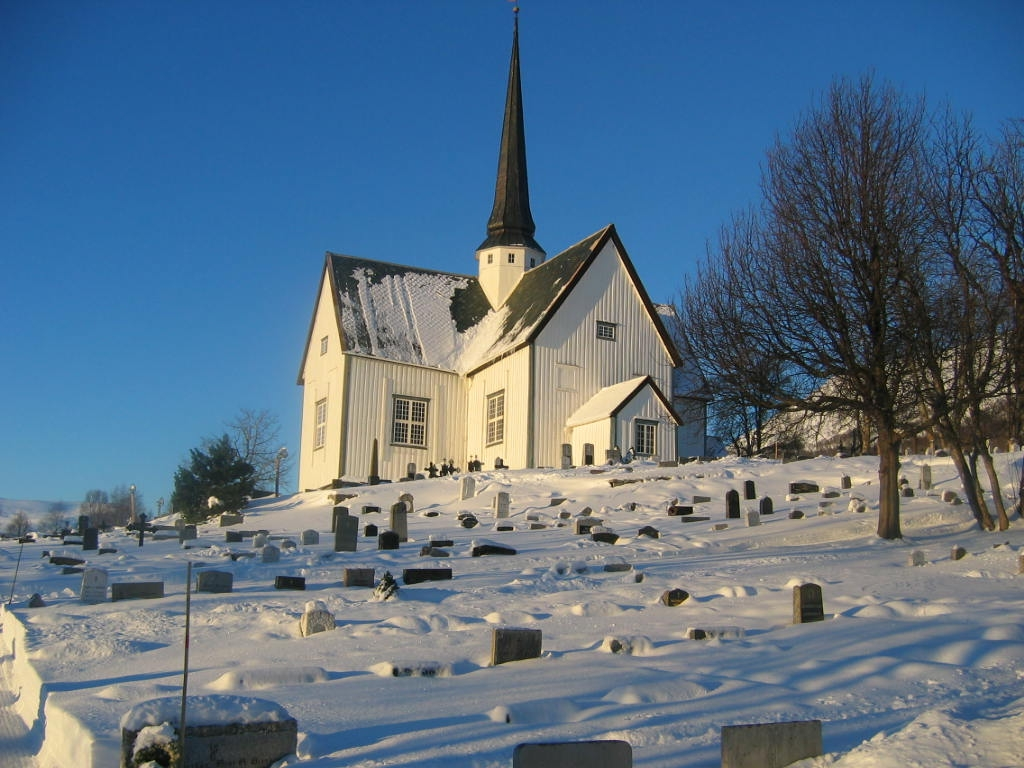
- View of the church
- Oppdal Church
- 62.607511234°N 09.645211011°E
- Location: Oppdal Municipality, Trøndelag
- Country: Norway
- Denomination: Church of Norway
- Churchmanship: Evangelical Lutheran

History
- Status: Parish church
- Founded: 12th century
- Consecrated: 12 March 1651

Architecture
- Functional status: Active
- Architect: Ole Jonsen Hindrum
- Architectural type: Cruciform
- Completed: 1651 (375 years ago)

Specifications
- Capacity: 450
- Materials: Wood

Administration
- Diocese: Nidaros bispedømme
- Deanery: Gauldal prosti
- Parish: Oppdal
- Norwegian Cultural Heritage Site
- Type: Church
- Status: Automatically protected
- ID: 85223

Oppdal Church (Norwegian: Oppdal kirke) is a parish church of the Church of Norway in Oppdal Municipality in Trøndelag county, Norway. It is located at the Vang farm, near Norwegian National Road 70, just west of the village of Oppdal. It is the main church for the Oppdal parish which is part of the Gauldal prosti (deanery) in the Diocese of Nidaros. The white, wooden church was built in a cruciform style in 1651 using plans drawn up by the architects Ole Jonsen Hindrum and Nils Olsen. The church seats about 450 people. The church is sometimes nicknamed "Marit på Vang".

== History ==
The earliest existing historical records of the church date back to the year 1297, but it was not new that year. The first church at Oppdal was a stave church that was likely built during the 12th century on the same site as the present church. It was located on the Vang farm which is now part of the village of Oppdal, so originally it was often called Vang Church. The church was dedicated to St. Edmund.

In 1637-1638, the church was repaired and expanded, but just over ten years later, the old church was torn down to make room for a new church on the same site. The new church was consecrated on 12 March 1651 by Bishop Erik Bredal. In 1674, a builder named Knud was hired to strengthen the foundation of the young building because the tower above the nave was too heavy for the walls to hold and the walls were beginning to buckle. Even after the strengthened foundation, the walls were still a little crooked.

In 1814, this church served as an election church (Norwegian: valgkirke). Together with more than 300 other parish churches across Norway, it was a polling station for elections to the 1814 Norwegian Constituent Assembly which wrote the Constitution of Norway. This was Norway's first national elections. Each church parish was a constituency that elected people called "electors" who later met together in each county to elect the representatives for the assembly that was to meet at Eidsvoll Manor later that year.

== Media gallery ==
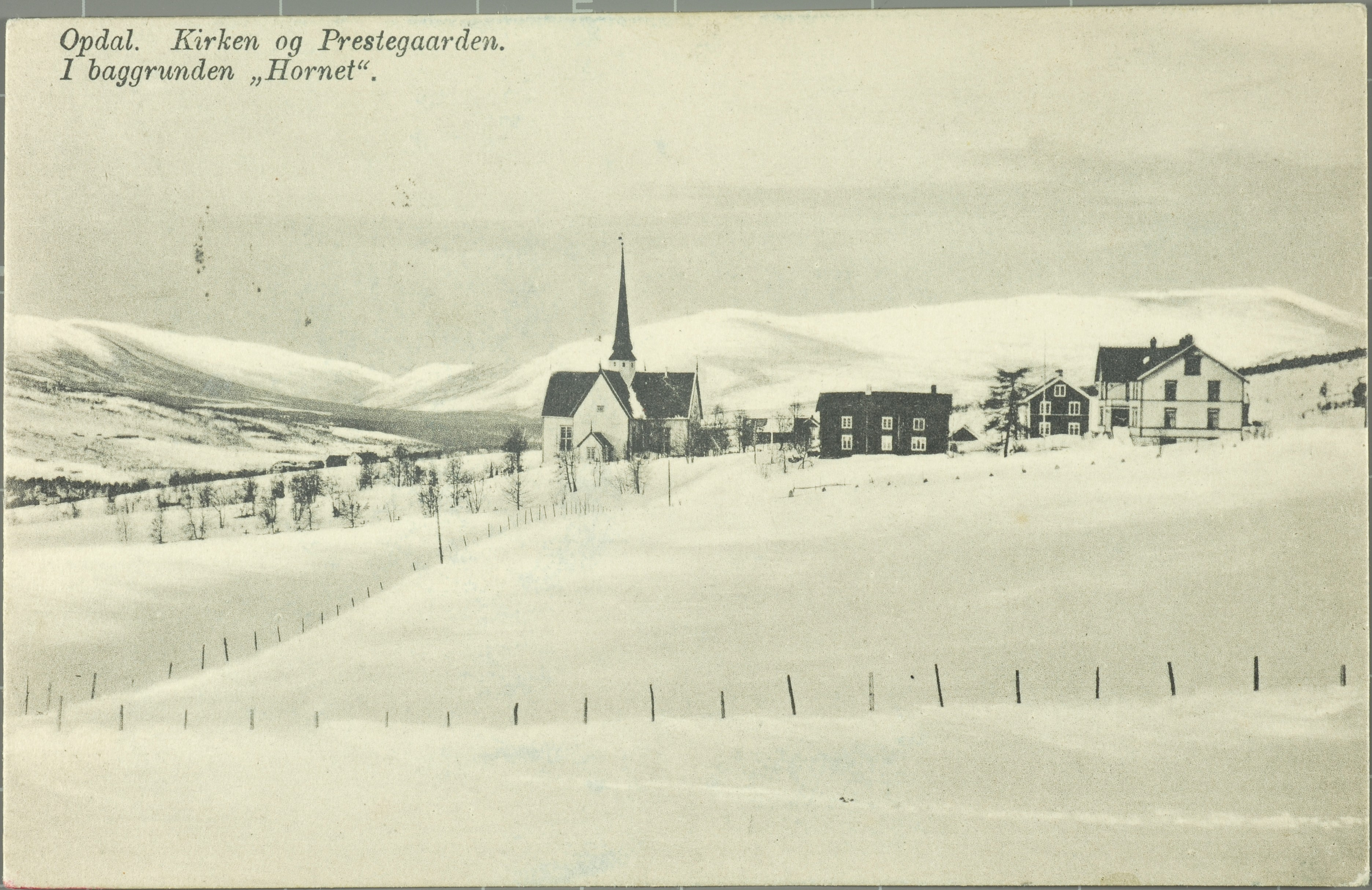

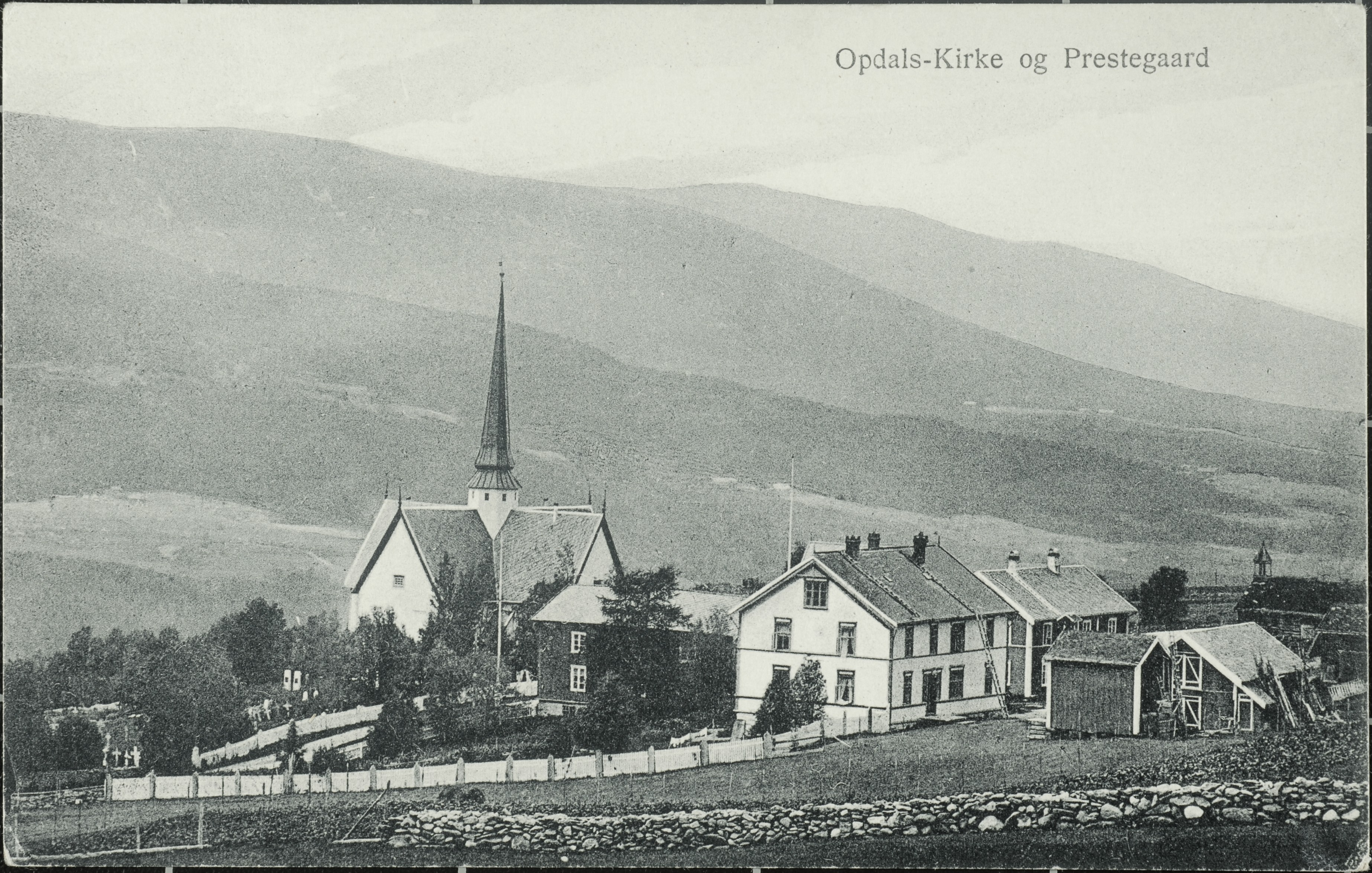

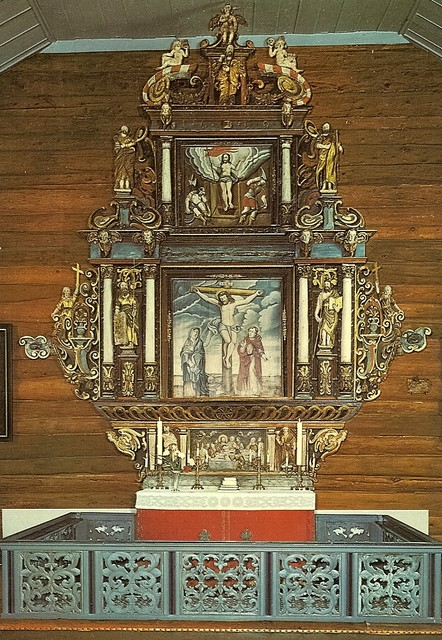

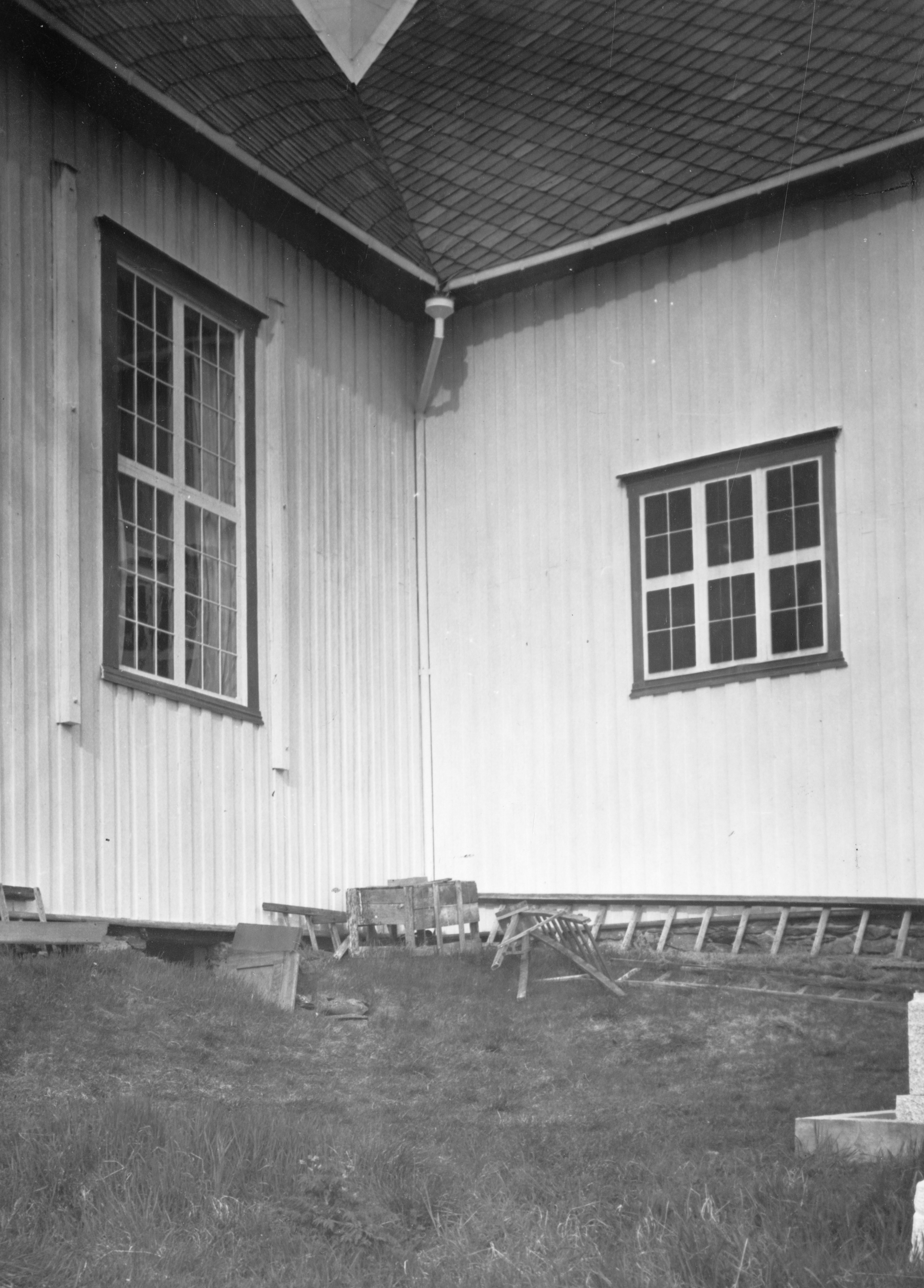

== See also ==
- List of churches in Nidaros
