= Oppdal Municipality =

Municipality in Trøndelag, Norway

Oppdal Municipality Oppdal kommune
- Municipality
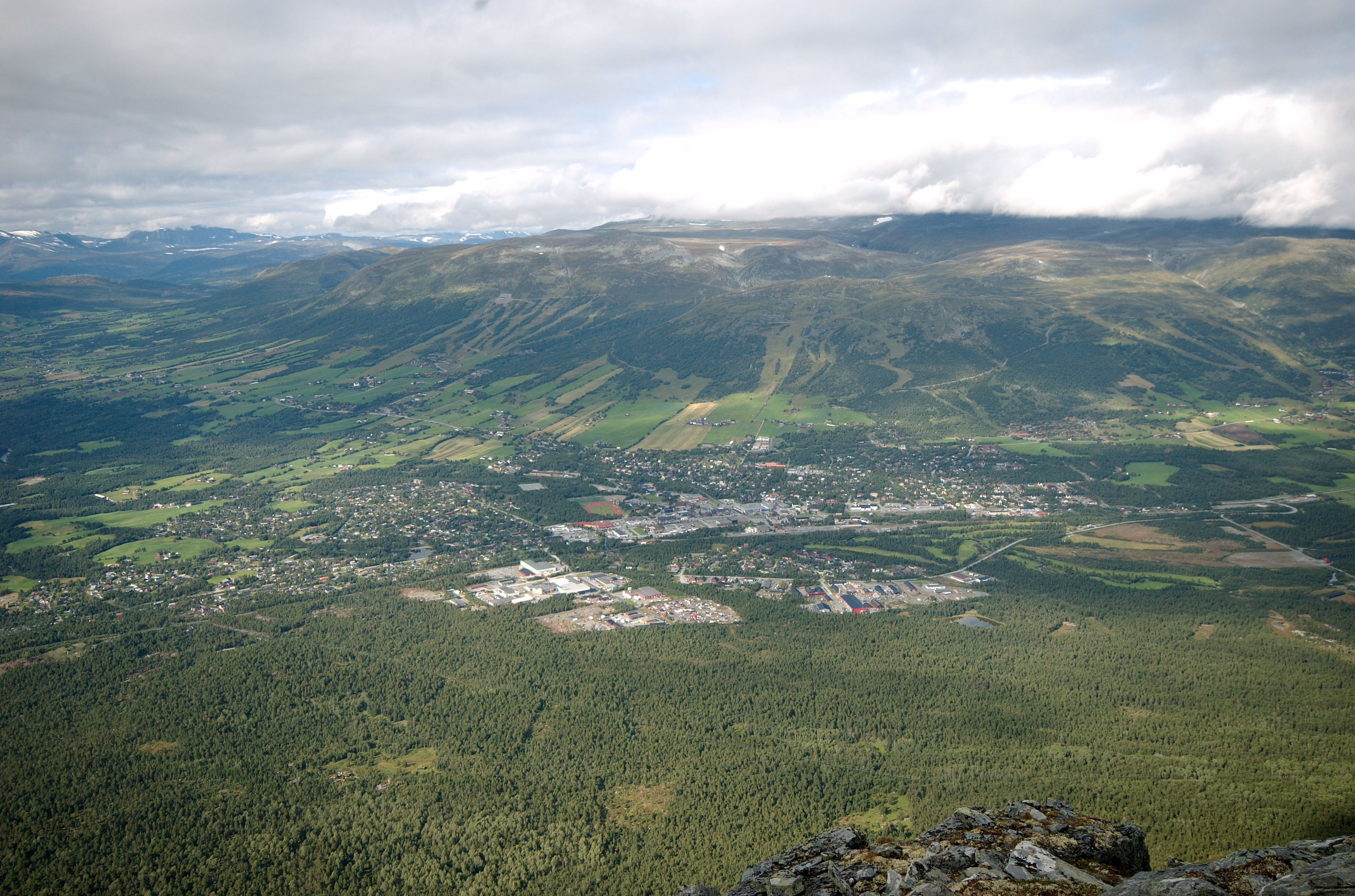
- Oppdal as seen from the Almann Mountain in August 2008

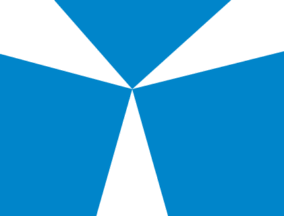
- Flag Coat of arms

- Trøndelag within Norway

- Oppdal within Trøndelag
- Coordinates: 62°34′25″N 09°36′32″E
- Country: Norway
- County: Trøndelag
- District: Dovre Region
- Established: 1 Jan 1838
  - Created as: Formannskapsdistrikt
- Administrative centre: Oppdal

Government
  - Mayor (2023): Elisabeth Hals (V)

Area
  - Total: 2,274.11 km^{2} (878.04 sq mi)
  - Land: 2,201.39 km^{2} (849.96 sq mi)
  - Water: 72.72 km^{2} (28.08 sq mi) 3.2%
  - Rank: #24 in Norway
- Highest elevation: 1,983.27 m (6,506.8 ft)

Population (2024)
  - Total: 7,389
  - Rank: #139 in Norway
  - Density: 3.2/km^{2} (8.3/sq mi)
  - Change (10 years): ▲ +8.4%
- Demonym: Oppdaling

Official language
  - Norwegian form: Neutral
- Time zone: UTC+01:00 (CET)
  - Summer (DST): UTC+02:00 (CEST)
- ISO 3166 code: NO-5021
- Website: Official website

Oppdal is a municipality in Trøndelag county, Norway. It is part of the Dovre region. The administrative centre of the municipality is the village of Oppdal. Other villages in the municipality include Lønset, Vognillan, Fagerhaugen, and Holan. The Oppdal Airport, Fagerhaug is located in the northeastern part of the municipality.

The 2,274-square-kilometre (878 sq mi) municipality is the 24th largest by area out of the 357 municipalities in Norway. Oppdal Municipality is the 139th most populous municipality in Norway with a population of 7,389. The municipality's population density is 3.2 inhabitants per square kilometre (8.3/sq mi) and its population has increased by 8.4% over the previous 10-year period.

== General information ==
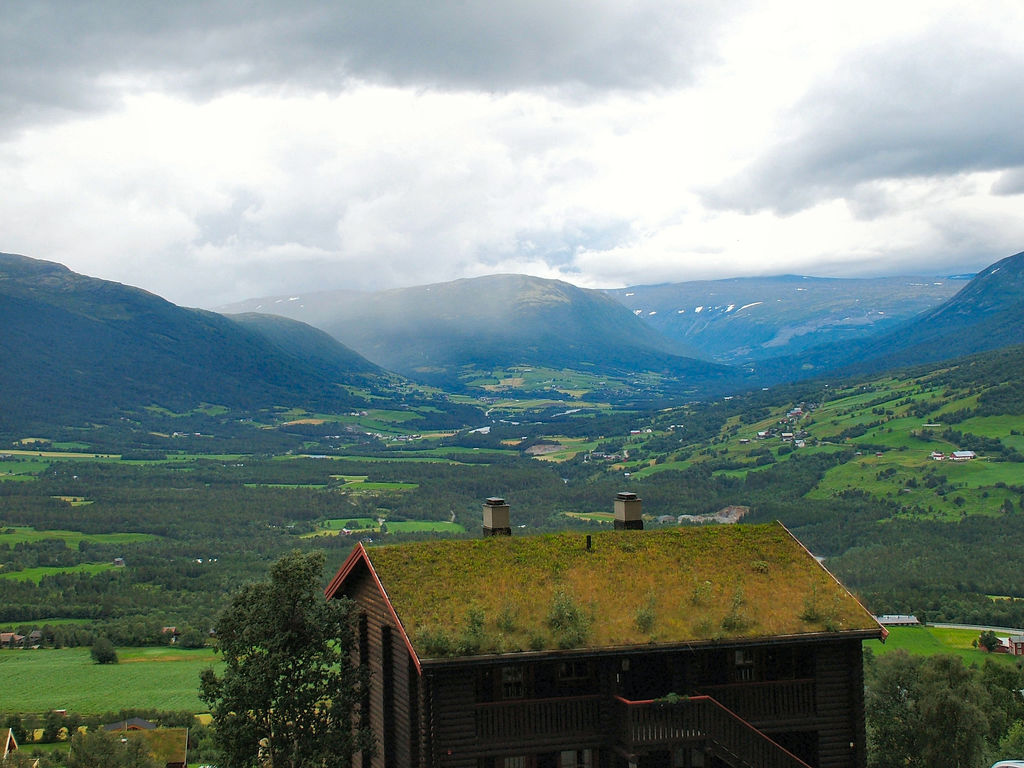
Oppdal is situated where two valleys meet, surrounded by mountains.

The prestegjeld of Oppdal was established as a municipality on 1 January 1838 (see formannskapsdistrikt law). The municipal boundaries have not changed since that time. On 1 January 2018, the municipality switched from the old Sør-Trøndelag county to the new Trøndelag county.

=== Name ===
The municipality (originally the parish) is named after the old Oppdal farm (Old Norse: Uppdalr) since the first Oppdal Church was built there. The first element is upp which means "upper". The last element is dalr which means "valley" or "dale". Historically, the name was also spelled Opdal.

=== Coat of arms ===
The coat of arms was granted on 19 February 1982 (they were re-approved on 13 May 1983 after the government slightly changed the wording of the blazon). The official blazon is "Azure, three piles argent conjoined in pall" (Norwegian: I blått tre motstøtende sølv spisser i form av et gaffelkors). This means the arms have a blue field (background) and the charge is three triangles that meet in the centre, forming a Y-shaped design. The triangle design has a tincture of argent which means it is commonly colored white, but if it is made out of metal, then silver is used. The design was nicknamed "meeting of ways" (Norwegian: vegamot) representing three important roads that meet in Oppdal, making it a major centre of commerce and transportation. One road comes from Dombås in the south going over the Dovre Mountains, one road comes from Sunndalsøra in Nordmøre from west, and the third road comes from Trondheim in the north(east). Historically, this area was a gathering place due to its central location. The arms were designed by Einar H. Skjervold. The municipal flag has the same design as the coat of arms.

=== Churches ===
The Church of Norway has three parishes (sokn) within Oppdal Municipality. It is part of the Gauldal prosti (deanery) in the Diocese of Nidaros.

Churches in Oppdal Municipality
Parish (sokn)	Church name	Location of the church	Year built
Fagerhaug	Fagerhaug Chapel	Fagerhaugen	1921
Lønset	Lønset Chapel	Lønset	1863
Oppdal	Oppdal Church	Oppdal	1651
Oppdal	St. Mikael's Chapel	south of Holan	2012

== History ==
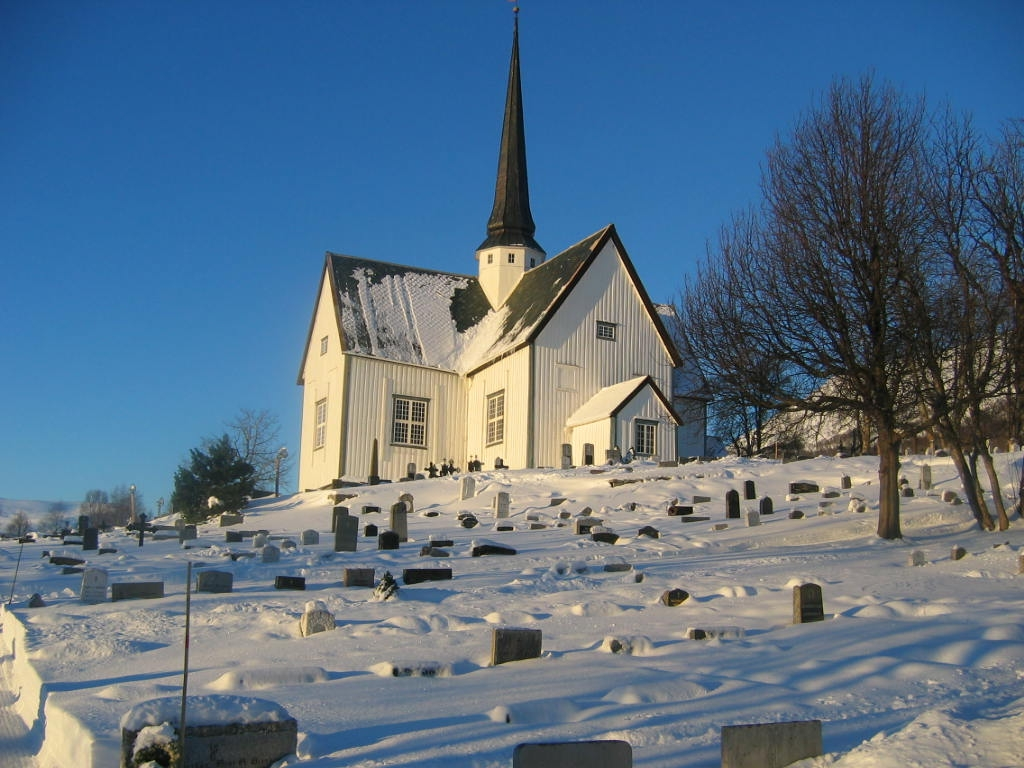
View of Oppdal Church also known as "Marit Vang" Credit: Daniel Northall – 28 Dec 2005

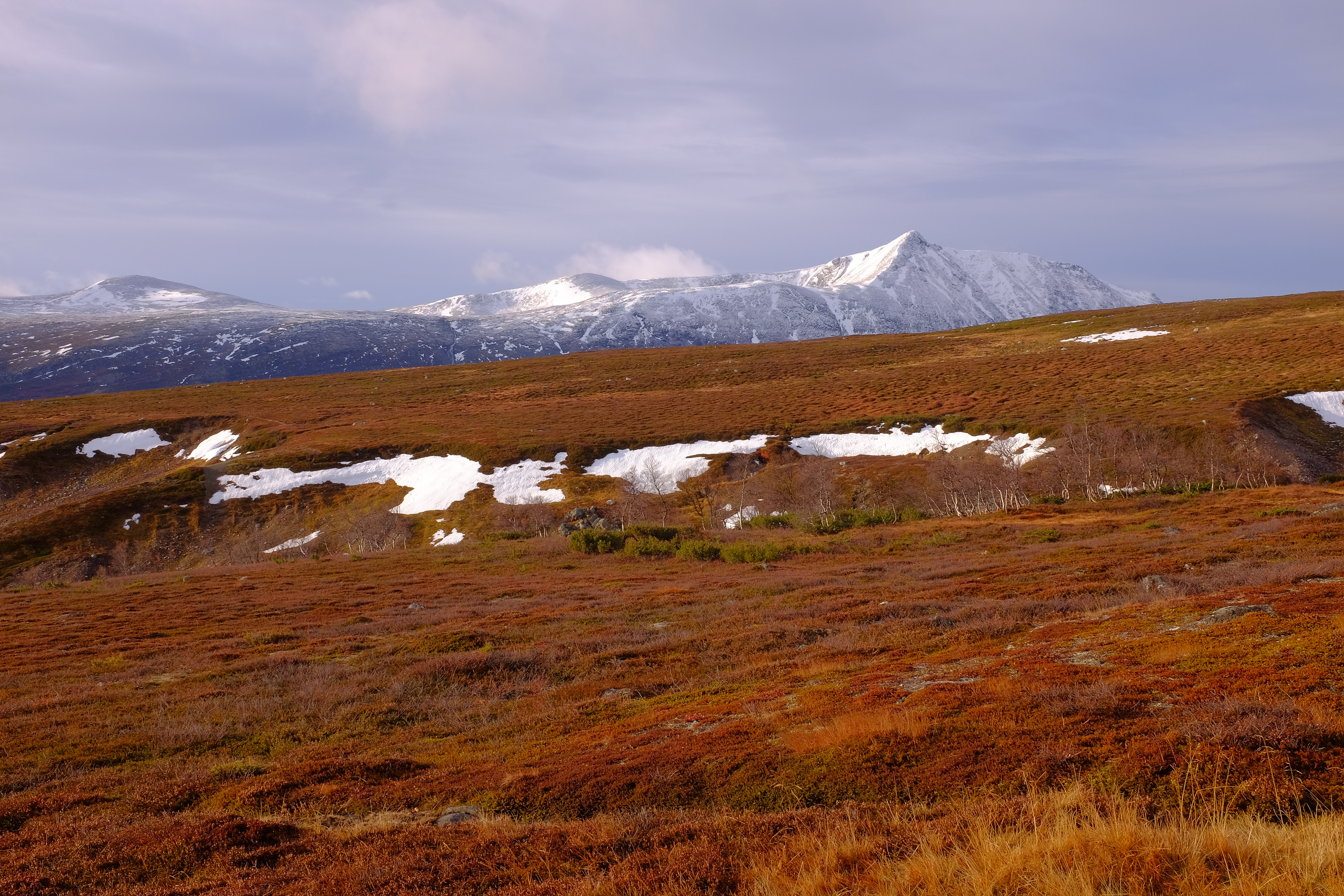
Autumn in the mountains, Oppdal Municipality

=== Prehistory ===
Oppdal is an alpine community which dates back to the Norwegian Iron Age. It is located at a crossroads for traffic from Trondheim, the Dovrefjell mountain range, and Sunndal Municipality on the west coast. This is reflected in the three rays in the coat-of-arms.

Oppdal was first settled sometime before 600 CE. By then there were about 50 farms in the area, and this number grew by about 20 more in the Viking Age. There are remnants of over 700 Pagan grave mounds from the time at Vang, in which jewelry and other pieces from the British Isles were found. This indicates that the area was relatively affluent and participated in the Viking trade. Much of the affluence was likely derived from the availability of game, both in the area and from nearby mountain ranges. Several game traps can still be seen in mountains around Oppdal, particularly ditches for reindeer. There have been more than 80 finds of at least two different types of arrowheads in the area.

Archeological finds in Oppdal indicate that there were less pronounced economic disparities than elsewhere in Norway. Communal efforts to hold off famine and share burdens appear to have been common throughout several centuries.

=== Middle Ages ===
During the Christian era, Pagan shrines and grave mounds were replaced by churches and chapels. Five rural churches were built in Oppdal at the time, in Vang, Ålbu, Lønset, Lo, and Nordskogen. The Oppdal Church, built to replace an earlier stave church in 1653, stands to this day.

Oppdal was a stop for pilgrims on their way to the St. Olav shrine at the Nidaros Cathedral in Trondheim during the Middle Ages. As a result of the heavy stream of pilgrims who followed the Pilgrim's Route prior to the Reformation, King Eystein erected mountain stations where the pilgrims could find food and shelter. Kongsvoll, located on the Driva River along the route where pilgrims passed from the Gudbrandsdal valley into Oppdal was one of these stations, and is still an inn today. Drivstua, further north, was another.

Oppdal was particularly affected by the Black Plague, which led to the abandonment of a number of farms. With a worsening of the climate, the community hadn't recovered 170 years later, and there were only 35 farms and 350 people left. Only one church at Vang was still in use. As late as 1742, people in Oppdal died of hunger.

=== Modern period ===
In the early 17th century, Oppdal's fortunes turned and population grew. By 1665, 2,200 people lived in Oppdal, and a new church was built at Vang, the Oppdal Church, which stands to this day. The Lønset Chapel and Fagerhaug Chapel have been re-established, and Oppdal houses several other religious communities. Since the 18th century, the inhabitants of Oppdal have made significant investments in education, leading to the establishment of several small rural schools and, recently, a high school.

In the 19th century, increased fertility and reduced mortality led to population growth that could not be sustained by agricultural resources. Many became tenant farmers, and eventually a large proportion of people from Oppdal emigrated to the United States. The population decreased until 1910, when the railroad from Oslo to Trondheim via Dovre (the Dovre Line) created employment and opened the area for tourism. In 1952, the first ski lift opened, and with further expansions Oppdal now offers one of Norway's largest downhill networks.

During the German occupation of Norway (World War II), Oppdal and Dombås were the locations of the Stalag 380 prisoner-of-war camp, relocated in late 1942 from Skarżysko-Kamienna in German-occupied Poland.

In 2013, NRK said that a Labour Party politician was fighting against the establishment of a refugee center.

== Government ==
Oppdal Municipality is responsible for primary education (through 10th grade), outpatient health services, senior citizen services, welfare and other social services, zoning, economic development, and municipal roads and utilities. The municipality is governed by a municipal council of directly elected representatives. The mayor is indirectly elected by a vote of the municipal council. The municipality is under the jurisdiction of the Trøndelag District Court and the Frostating Court of Appeal. Waste management was provided by the inter-municipal agency Nordmøre Interkommunale Renovasjonsselskap until 2020, after which it merged into ReMidt.

=== Municipal council ===
The municipal council (Kommunestyre) of Oppdal Municipality is made up of 25 representatives that are elected to four year terms. The tables below show the current and historical composition of the council by political party.

Oppdal kommunestyre 2023–2027
Party name (in Norwegian)	Number of representatives
Labour Party (Arbeiderpartiet)	5
Progress Party (Fremskrittspartiet)	2
Green Party (Miljøpartiet De Grønne)	1
Conservative Party (Høyre)	4
Christian Democratic Party (Kristelig Folkeparti)	1
Centre Party (Senterpartiet)	4
Socialist Left Party (Sosialistisk Venstreparti)	1
Liberal Party (Venstre)	7
Total number of members:	25

Oppdal kommunestyre 2019–2023
Party name (in Norwegian)	Number of representatives
Labour Party (Arbeiderpartiet)	4
Green Party (Miljøpartiet De Grønne)	2
Conservative Party (Høyre)	3
Christian Democratic Party (Kristelig Folkeparti)	2
Centre Party (Senterpartiet)	10
Socialist Left Party (Sosialistisk Venstreparti)	1
Liberal Party (Venstre)	3
Total number of members:	25

Oppdal kommunestyre 2015–2019
Party name (in Norwegian)	Number of representatives
Labour Party (Arbeiderpartiet)	9
Progress Party (Fremskrittspartiet)	1
Conservative Party (Høyre)	4
Christian Democratic Party (Kristelig Folkeparti)	1
Centre Party (Senterpartiet)	6
Liberal Party (Venstre)	4
Total number of members:	25

Oppdal kommunestyre 2011–2015
Party name (in Norwegian)	Number of representatives
Labour Party (Arbeiderpartiet)	12
Progress Party (Fremskrittspartiet)	1
Conservative Party (Høyre)	3
Christian Democratic Party (Kristelig Folkeparti)	2
Centre Party (Senterpartiet)	4
Socialist Left Party (Sosialistisk Venstreparti)	1
Liberal Party (Venstre)	2
Total number of members:	25

Oppdal kommunestyre 2007–2011
Party name (in Norwegian)	Number of representatives
Labour Party (Arbeiderpartiet)	10
Progress Party (Fremskrittspartiet)	3
Conservative Party (Høyre)	2
Christian Democratic Party (Kristelig Folkeparti)	2
Centre Party (Senterpartiet)	6
Socialist Left Party (Sosialistisk Venstreparti)	1
Liberal Party (Venstre)	1
Total number of members:	25

Oppdal kommunestyre 2003–2007
Party name (in Norwegian)	Number of representatives
Labour Party (Arbeiderpartiet)	9
Progress Party (Fremskrittspartiet)	2
Conservative Party (Høyre)	3
Christian Democratic Party (Kristelig Folkeparti)	2
Centre Party (Senterpartiet)	5
Socialist Left Party (Sosialistisk Venstreparti)	2
Liberal Party (Venstre)	2
Total number of members:	25

Oppdal kommunestyre 1999–2003
Party name (in Norwegian)	Number of representatives
Labour Party (Arbeiderpartiet)	8
Conservative Party (Høyre)	5
Centre Party (Senterpartiet)	8
Socialist Left Party (Sosialistisk Venstreparti)	1
Liberal Party (Venstre)	3
Total number of members:	25

Oppdal kommunestyre 1995–1999
Party name (in Norwegian)	Number of representatives
Labour Party (Arbeiderpartiet)	8
Conservative Party (Høyre)	3
Christian Democratic Party (Kristelig Folkeparti)	2
Centre Party (Senterpartiet)	9
Socialist Left Party (Sosialistisk Venstreparti)	1
Liberal Party (Venstre)	2
Total number of members:	25

Oppdal kommunestyre 1991–1995
Party name (in Norwegian)	Number of representatives
Labour Party (Arbeiderpartiet)	8
Conservative Party (Høyre)	4
Christian Democratic Party (Kristelig Folkeparti)	2
Centre Party (Senterpartiet)	8
Socialist Left Party (Sosialistisk Venstreparti)	2
Liberal Party (Venstre)	1
Total number of members:	25

Oppdal kommunestyre 1987–1991
Party name (in Norwegian)	Number of representatives
Labour Party (Arbeiderpartiet)	10
Conservative Party (Høyre)	6
Christian Democratic Party (Kristelig Folkeparti)	2
Centre Party (Senterpartiet)	5
Liberal Party (Venstre)	2
Total number of members:	25

Oppdal kommunestyre 1983–1987
Party name (in Norwegian)	Number of representatives
Labour Party (Arbeiderpartiet)	9
Conservative Party (Høyre)	5
Christian Democratic Party (Kristelig Folkeparti)	3
Centre Party (Senterpartiet)	5
Socialist Left Party (Sosialistisk Venstreparti)	1
Liberal Party (Venstre)	2
Total number of members:	25

Oppdal kommunestyre 1979–1983
Party name (in Norwegian)	Number of representatives
Labour Party (Arbeiderpartiet)	9
Conservative Party (Høyre)	6
Christian Democratic Party (Kristelig Folkeparti)	3
Centre Party (Senterpartiet)	6
Liberal Party (Venstre)	1
Total number of members:	25

Oppdal kommunestyre 1975–1979
Party name (in Norwegian)	Number of representatives
Labour Party (Arbeiderpartiet)	9
Conservative Party (Høyre)	2
Christian Democratic Party (Kristelig Folkeparti)	3
New People's Party (Nye Folkepartiet)	1
Centre Party (Senterpartiet)	8
Liberal Party (Venstre)	1
Oppdal Free Voters (Oppdal Frie Velgere)	1
Total number of members:	25

Oppdal kommunestyre 1971–1975
Party name (in Norwegian)	Number of representatives
Labour Party (Arbeiderpartiet)	10
Conservative Party (Høyre)	1
Christian Democratic Party (Kristelig Folkeparti)	3
Centre Party (Senterpartiet)	9
Liberal Party (Venstre)	2
Total number of members:	25

Oppdal kommunestyre 1967–1971
Party name (in Norwegian)	Number of representatives
Labour Party (Arbeiderpartiet)	10
Conservative Party (Høyre)	2
Christian Democratic Party (Kristelig Folkeparti)	2
Centre Party (Senterpartiet)	9
Liberal Party (Venstre)	2
Total number of members:	25

Oppdal kommunestyre 1963–1967
Party name (in Norwegian)	Number of representatives
Labour Party (Arbeiderpartiet)	11
Conservative Party (Høyre)	2
Christian Democratic Party (Kristelig Folkeparti)	2
Centre Party (Senterpartiet)	8
Liberal Party (Venstre)	2
Total number of members:	25

Oppdal herredsstyre 1959–1963
Party name (in Norwegian)	Number of representatives
Labour Party (Arbeiderpartiet)	9
Conservative Party (Høyre)	3
Christian Democratic Party (Kristelig Folkeparti)	2
Centre Party (Senterpartiet)	9
Liberal Party (Venstre)	2
Total number of members:	25

Oppdal herredsstyre 1955–1959
Party name (in Norwegian)	Number of representatives
Labour Party (Arbeiderpartiet)	10
Conservative Party (Høyre)	2
Christian Democratic Party (Kristelig Folkeparti)	2
Farmers' Party (Bondepartiet)	9
Liberal Party (Venstre)	2
Total number of members:	25

Oppdal herredsstyre 1951–1955
Party name (in Norwegian)	Number of representatives
Labour Party (Arbeiderpartiet)	9
Conservative Party (Høyre)	1
Christian Democratic Party (Kristelig Folkeparti)	3
Farmers' Party (Bondepartiet)	8
Liberal Party (Venstre)	3
Total number of members:	24

Opdal herredsstyre 1947–1951
Party name (in Norwegian)	Number of representatives
Labour Party (Arbeiderpartiet)	8
Christian Democratic Party (Kristelig Folkeparti)	3
Farmers' Party (Bondepartiet)	8
Liberal Party (Venstre)	4
Local List(s) (Lokale lister)	1
Total number of members:	24

Opdal herredsstyre 1945–1947
Party name (in Norwegian)	Number of representatives
Labour Party (Arbeiderpartiet)	9
Christian Democratic Party (Kristelig Folkeparti)	3
Farmers' Party (Bondepartiet)	7
Liberal Party (Venstre)	5
Total number of members:	24

Opdal herredsstyre 1937–1941*
Party name (in Norwegian)	Number of representatives
Labour Party (Arbeiderpartiet)	7
Farmers' Party (Bondepartiet)	11
Liberal Party (Venstre)	6
Total number of members:	24
Note: Due to the German occupation of Norway during World War II, no elections were held for new municipal councils until after the war ended in 1945.

=== Mayors ===
The mayor (Norwegian: ordfører) of Oppdal Municipality is the political leader of the municipality and the chairperson of the municipal council. Here is a list of people who have held this position:

- 1838–1841: Ingebrigt Haldorsen Sæter
- 1842–1845: Peder Sæther
- 1846–1847: John Furunes
- 1848–1871: Ingebrigt Haldorsen Sæter
- 1872–1875: Peder Sæther
- 1876–1879: Ingebrigt Vigen
- 1880–1889: Mons Bjørlo (V)
- 1890–1895: Iver Ørsta (V)
- 1896–1904: Ole P. Haugseth (V)
- 1905–1907: Iver Ørsta (V)
- 1908–1916: Ole P. Haugseth (V)
- 1917–1919: John Engelsjord (V)
- 1920–1922: Engel Meslo (V)
- 1923–1925: Sivert H. Sæther (Bp)
- 1926–1928: Esten K. Gorseth (Bp)
- 1929–1931: Ole Olsen Stuen (Bp)
- 1932–1937: Peder O. Haugseth (Bp)
- 1938–1940: Esten K. Gorseth (Bp)
- 1941–1941: Håkon S. Wognild (NS)
- 1941–1945: Georg K. Aalbu (NS)
- 1945–1945: Esten K. Gorseth (Bp)
- 1946–1947: Ole I. Aalbu (V)
- 1948–1951: Leif Skorem (Bp)
- 1952–1959: Knut H. Dørum (Bp)
- 1960–1965: Hallvard Bjørndal (Sp)
- 1966–1967: Ola P. Hoel (Sp)
- 1968–1971: Ola Erik Stugu (Sp)
- 1972–1975: Ola P. Hoel (Sp)
- 1976–1979: Erik A. Nerhoel (Sp)
- 1980–1983: Ola P. Hoel (Sp)
- 1984–1985: Per Asphaug (H)
- 1986–1987: Hans Rogstad (KrF)
- 1988–1992: Ola Røtvei (Ap)
- 1992–1993: Ola Arne Aune (Sp)
- 1994–2003: John Egil Holden (Sp)
- 2003–2015: Ola Røtvei (Ap)
- 2015–2019: Kirsti Welander (Ap)
- 2019–2023: Geir Arild Espnes (Sp)
- 2023–present: Elisabeth Hals (V)

== Geography ==
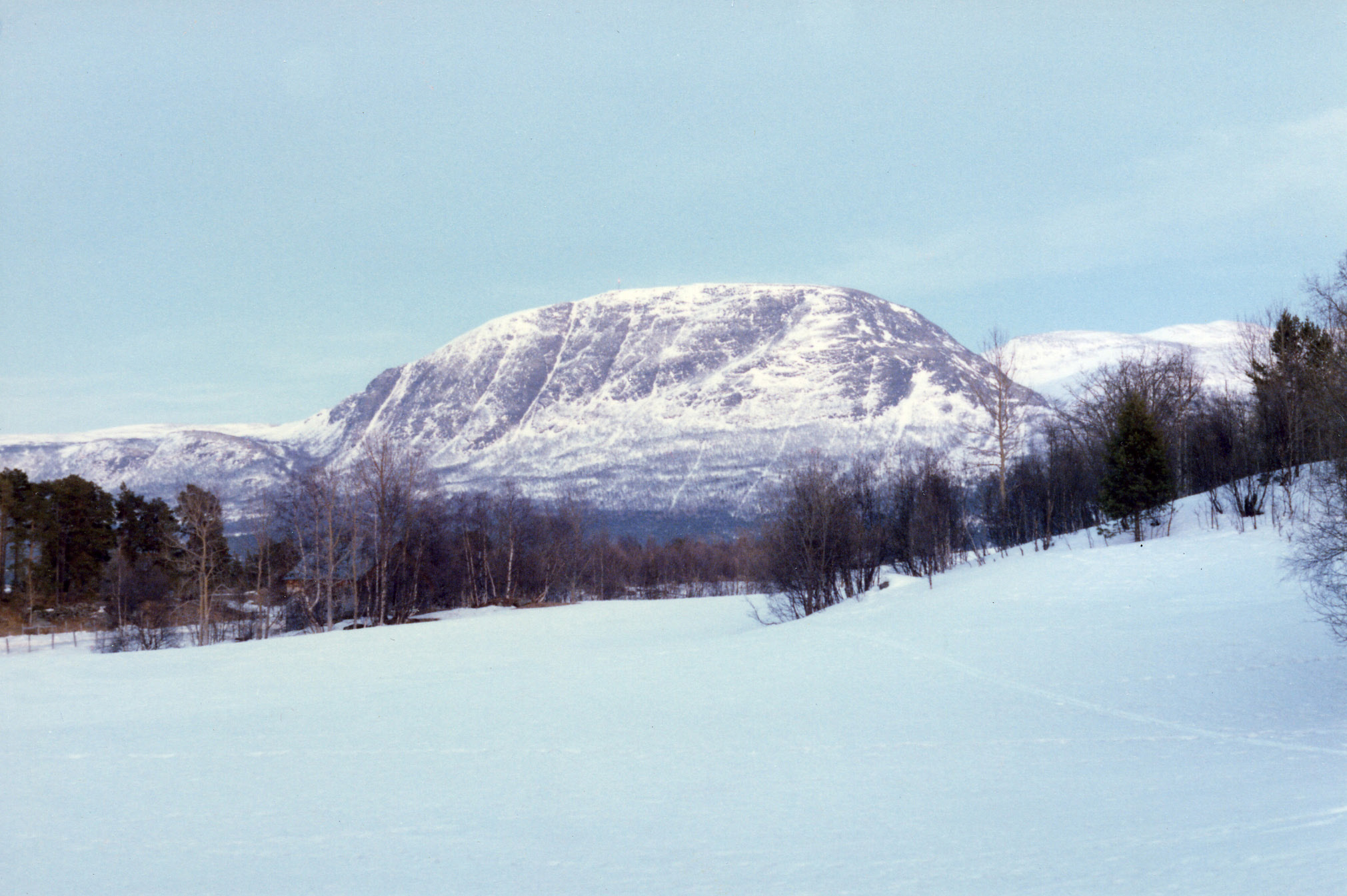
Almannberget in Oppdal

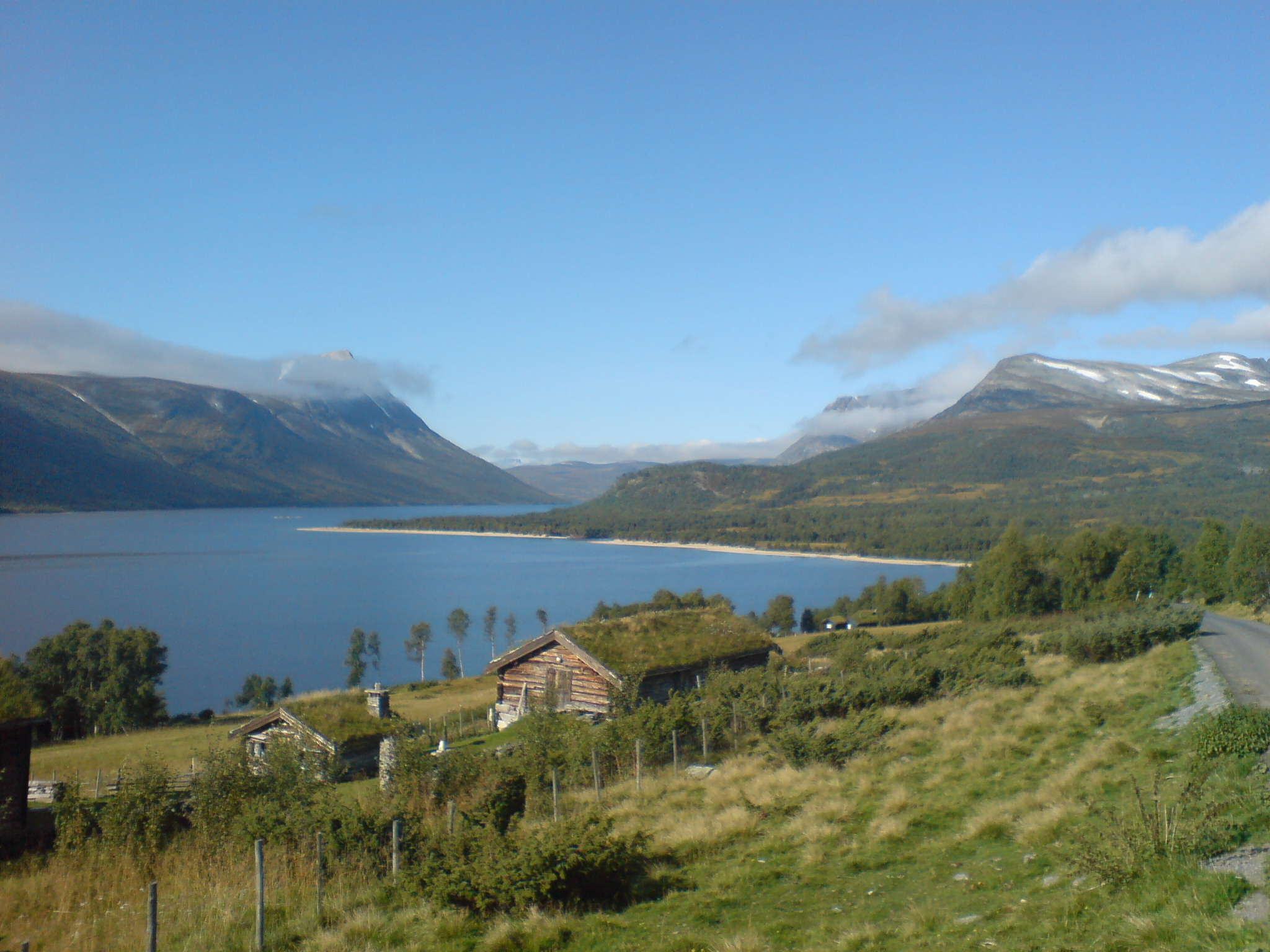
Gjevillvatnet lake with dairy farms and the white Raudøra beach

Oppdal is bordered by two municipalities in Trøndelag county (Rennebu Municipality to the northeast and Rindal Municipality to the west), two municipalities in Møre og Romsdal county (Surnadal Municipality to the north and Sunndal Municipality to the west), and three municipalities in Innlandet county (Tynset Municipality to the east and Folldal Municipality and Dovre Municipality to the south).

European route E6 passes straight through the commercial center of Oppdal going north and south, and Norwegian National Road 70 connects Oppdal to Kristiansund in the west.

The southeastern part of Trollheimen mountain range is located in the municipality. The municipality covers an area equal to the entire county of Vestfold. The administrative centre is at 545 metres (1,788 ft) above sea level. In 2001, its drinking water was named the best in Norway.

Most of Oppdal's area is mountainous, with large areas above the treeline. The highest point in the municipality is the 1,983.27-metre (6,506.8 ft) tall mountain Storskrymten. This mountain is a tripoint on the border of Lesja Municipality (in Innlandet), Sunndal Municipality (in Møre og Romsdal), and Oppdal Municipality (in Trøndelag county. Other mountains include Blåhøa and Allmannberget. The Speilsalen ice tunnel was a glacial formation near Blåhøa.

In the valleys there are creeks and rivers which are surrounded by spruce and pine woods; closer to the treeline, birches dominate. There are several lakes in the municipality, the most famous being Gjevillvatnet, a particularly scenic lake with hiking and cross-country skiing trails around it. The lake Fundin is located in the southern part of the municipality.

Heather and alpine meadows provide grazing for sheep in the summer. About 1,161 square kilometres (448 sq mi) of the mountains has been held since time immemorial as a collective (almenning) by farmers in the area, giving them the right to hunt, fish, and rent cabins.

=== Climate ===
Oppdal has a boreal climate, with spring as the driest season and summer as the wettest season. The climate is slightly continental with an average annual precipitation of only 600 millimetres (24 in). Considering the inland location and the altitude of 600 metres (2,000 ft) above sea level, the winters are fairly mild. The all-time high 30.1 °C (86.2 °F) was recorded 26 July 2019. The all-time low −26.1 °C (−15.0 °F) is from February 2010. The weather station at Oppdal-Sæther (elevation: 604 metres [1,982 ft]) started recording December 1999. The earlier weather station Oppdal-Bjørke (elevation: 625 metres [2,051 ft]) recorded from 1975 to August 1992. Data for precipitation days is from Oppdal-Mjøen (elevation: 512 metres [1,680 ft]), which averaged just 470 millimetres (19 in) annually in 1961–1990.

Snakes have never made it to Oppdal, and snowy weather is not that unusual on the 17 May National Day celebrations.

Climate data for Oppdal 1991–2020 (604 m, avg high/low 2004–2020, precip days 1961–90, extremes 1975–2024 incl earlier station)
Month	Jan	Feb	Mar	Apr	May	Jun	Jul	Aug	Sep	Oct	Nov	Dec	Year
Record high °C (°F)	11.4 (52.5)	11.7 (53.1)	14.6 (58.3)	18.9 (66.0)	26.8 (80.2)	27.7 (81.9)	30.1 (86.2)	26.8 (80.2)	26.2 (79.2)	20.3 (68.5)	14.8 (58.6)	12.1 (53.8)	30.1 (86.2)
Mean daily maximum °C (°F)	−1 (30)	0 (32)	2 (36)	7 (45)	11 (52)	16 (61)	18 (64)	17 (63)	13 (55)	8 (46)	3 (37)	0 (32)	8 (46)
Daily mean °C (°F)	−2.9 (26.8)	−3.5 (25.7)	−1.8 (28.8)	2.3 (36.1)	6.4 (43.5)	9.9 (49.8)	13 (55)	12.1 (53.8)	8.5 (47.3)	3.3 (37.9)	0 (32)	−2.8 (27.0)	3.7 (38.6)
Mean daily minimum °C (°F)	−6 (21)	−6 (21)	−5 (23)	−1 (30)	3 (37)	6 (43)	9 (48)	8 (46)	6 (43)	1 (34)	−2 (28)	−5 (23)	1 (33)
Record low °C (°F)	−25.8 (−14.4)	−26.1 (−15.0)	−21.8 (−7.2)	−15 (5)	−8.6 (16.5)	−3.2 (26.2)	0.2 (32.4)	−0.8 (30.6)	−5.5 (22.1)	−15 (5)	−20.9 (−5.6)	−22.5 (−8.5)	−26.1 (−15.0)
Average precipitation mm (inches)	57.8 (2.28)	51.4 (2.02)	45.3 (1.78)	30.7 (1.21)	29.1 (1.15)	55.2 (2.17)	78 (3.1)	85 (3.3)	45.2 (1.78)	42.1 (1.66)	47 (1.9)	48.7 (1.92)	615.5 (24.27)
Average precipitation days (≥ 1.0 mm)	7	5	5	5	5	8	12	9	9	7	7	8	87
Source 1: yr.no and eklima/Norwegian Meteorological Institute
Source 2: weatheronline climate robot (avg high/low)

== Economy ==
The main industries in Oppdal today are agriculture, tourism, and some light manufacturing. It has the largest sheep population of any municipality in Norway, with 45,000 head of sheep put out to graze in the mountains every year. Oppdal Ski Center is one of Norway's best ski resorts and is surrounded by national parks. A slate quarry exists.

== Notable people ==
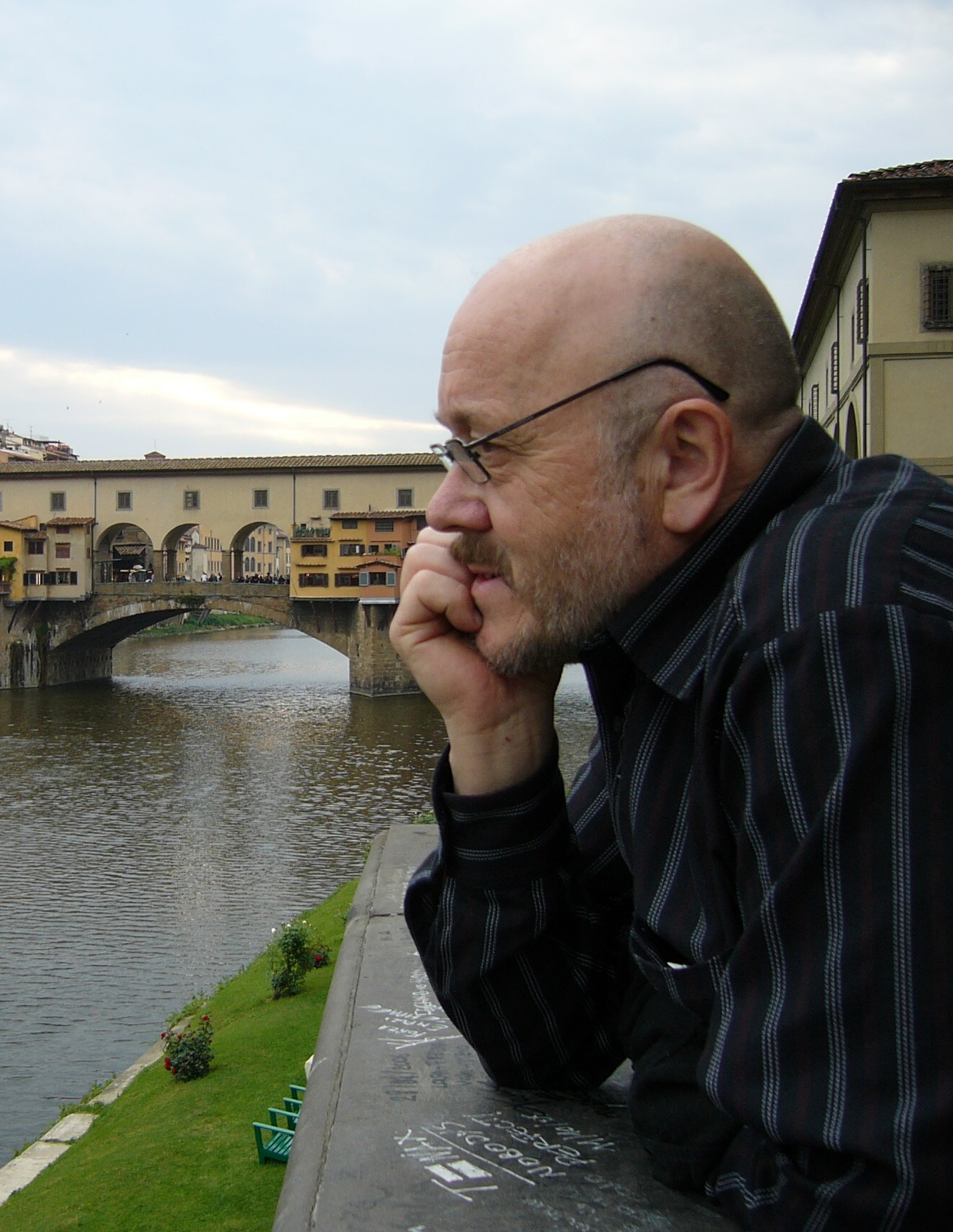
Harald Sæther, 2008

- Inge Krokann (1893 in Oppdal – 1962), a writer whose use of the Oppdal dialect makes the area central to his work
- Olav Dalgard (1898–1980), an art historian, filmmaker, author and educator who was raised at Oppdal
- Einar Ingvald Haugen (1906–1994), a Norwegian-American linguist, author, and professor at University of Wisconsin–Madison; he was born in Sioux City, Iowa, to Norwegians from Oppdal
- Sivert Donali (1931 in Oppdal – 2010), a Norwegian sculptor
- Harald Sæther (born 1946 in Oppdal), a Norwegian composer who lives in Oppdal
- Kåre Jostein Simonsen (born 1948 in Oppdal), a Norwegian bandoneon player
- Sjur Loen (born 1958 in Oppdal), a world champion curler
- Ingebrigt Håker Flaten (born 1971 in Oppdal), a bassist active in the jazz and free jazz genres
- Bård Bjorndalseter, a local woodcarver lives and works in Oppdal
- Twins Silje Øyre Slind and Astrid Øyre Slind (born 1988 in Oppdal), a Norwegian cross-country skiers
- Markus Høiberg (born 1991 in Oppdal), a curler who competed at the 2014 Winter Olympics
