= Oppdal (village) =

Village in Oppdal Municipality, Norway

Oppdal Auna
- Village
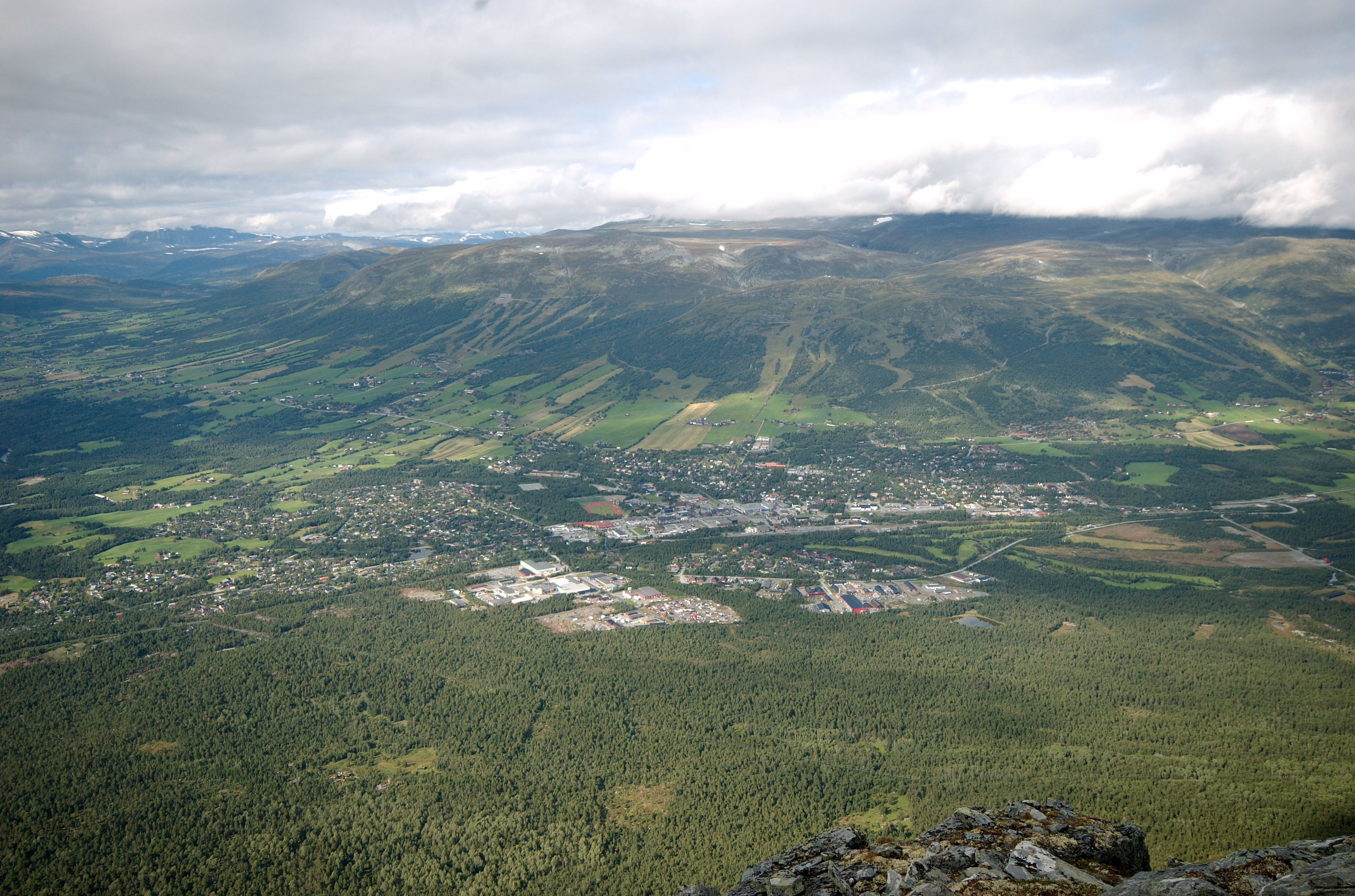
- View of the village
- Interactive map of Oppdal
- Location within Trøndelag Location within Norway
- Coordinates: 62.5943°N 09.6912°E
- Country: Norway
- Region: Central Norway
- County: Trøndelag
- District: Dovre
- Municipality: Oppdal Municipality

Area
  - Total: 3.72 km^{2} (1.44 sq mi)
- Elevation: 545 m (1,788 ft)

Population (2024)
  - Total: 4,637
  - Density: 1,247/km^{2} (3,230/sq mi)
- Time zone: UTC+01:00 (CET)
  - Summer (DST): UTC+02:00 (CEST)
- Post Code: 7340 Oppdal

Oppdal (locally: Auna) is the administrative centre of Oppdal Municipality in Trøndelag county, Norway. The village is located at the junction of the European route E06 and the Norwegian National Road 70. The villages of Vognillan, Fagerhaugen, and Driva are all located around Oppdal to the west, north, and south respectively.

The 3.72-square-kilometre (920-acre) village has a population (2024) of 4,637 which gives the village a population density of 1,247 inhabitants per square kilometre (3,230/sq mi).

The village of Oppdal is the site of the municipal government services as well as a school, mall, hotel, stores and businesses as well as the historic Oppdal Church. The Dovrebanen railway line passes through the village, stopping at the Oppdal Station.

== Name ==
The village (originally the parish) is named after the old Oppdal farm (Old Norse: Uppdalr) since the first Oppdal Church was built there. The first element is upp which means "upper". The last element is dalr which means "valley" or "dale". Historically, the name was also spelled Opdal.

== Media gallery ==
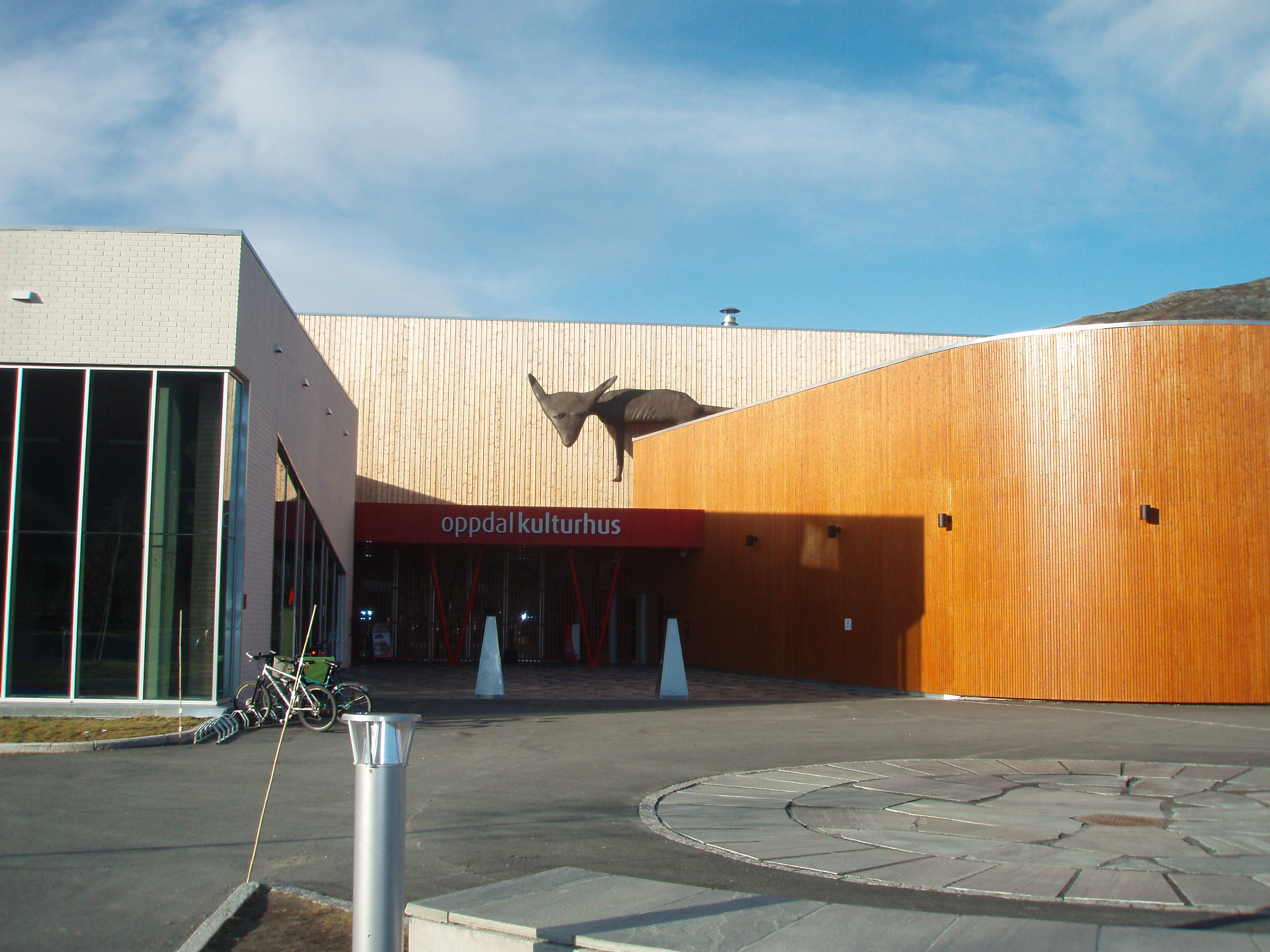
Oppdal kulturhus

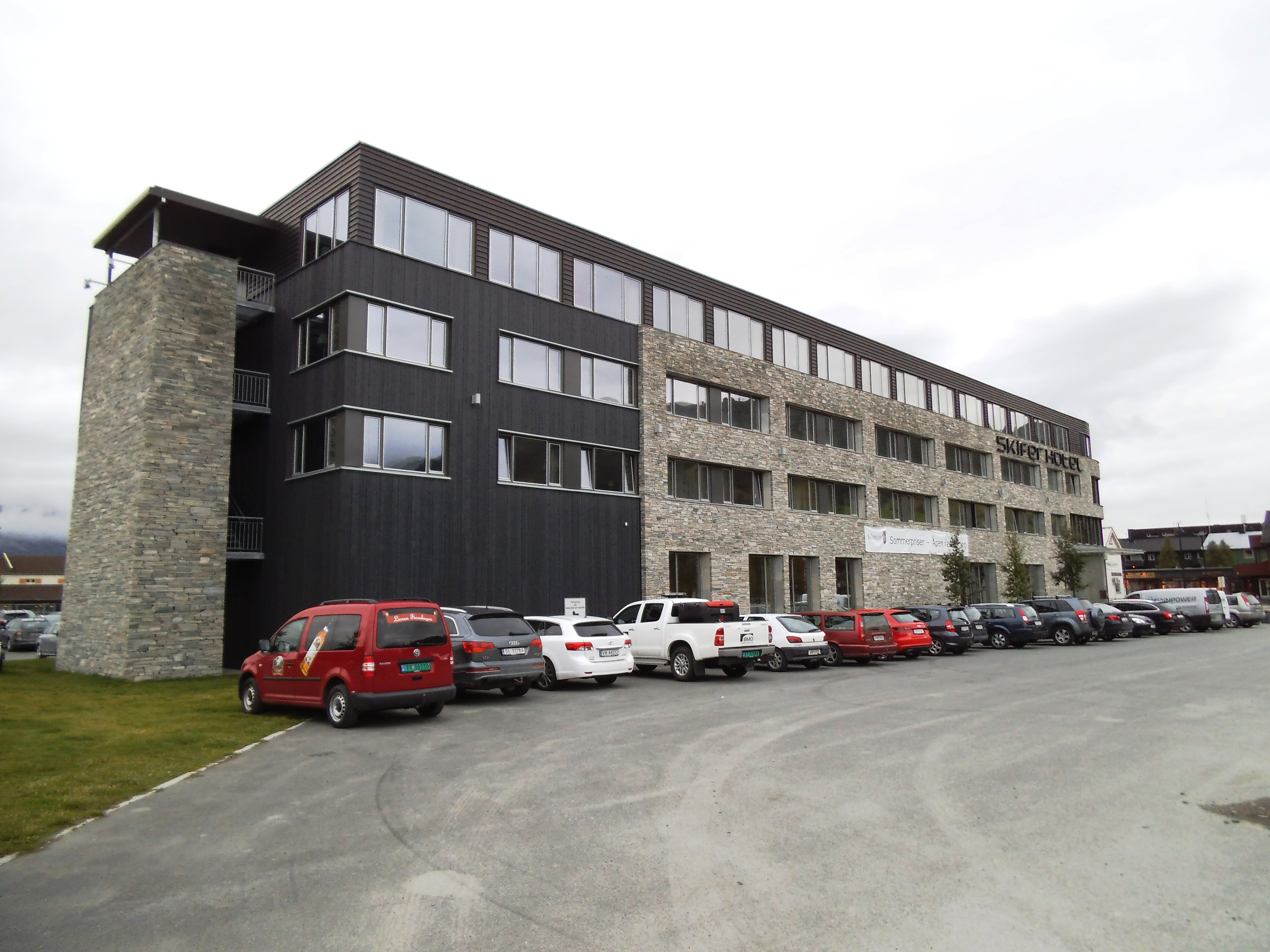
Skifer hotel

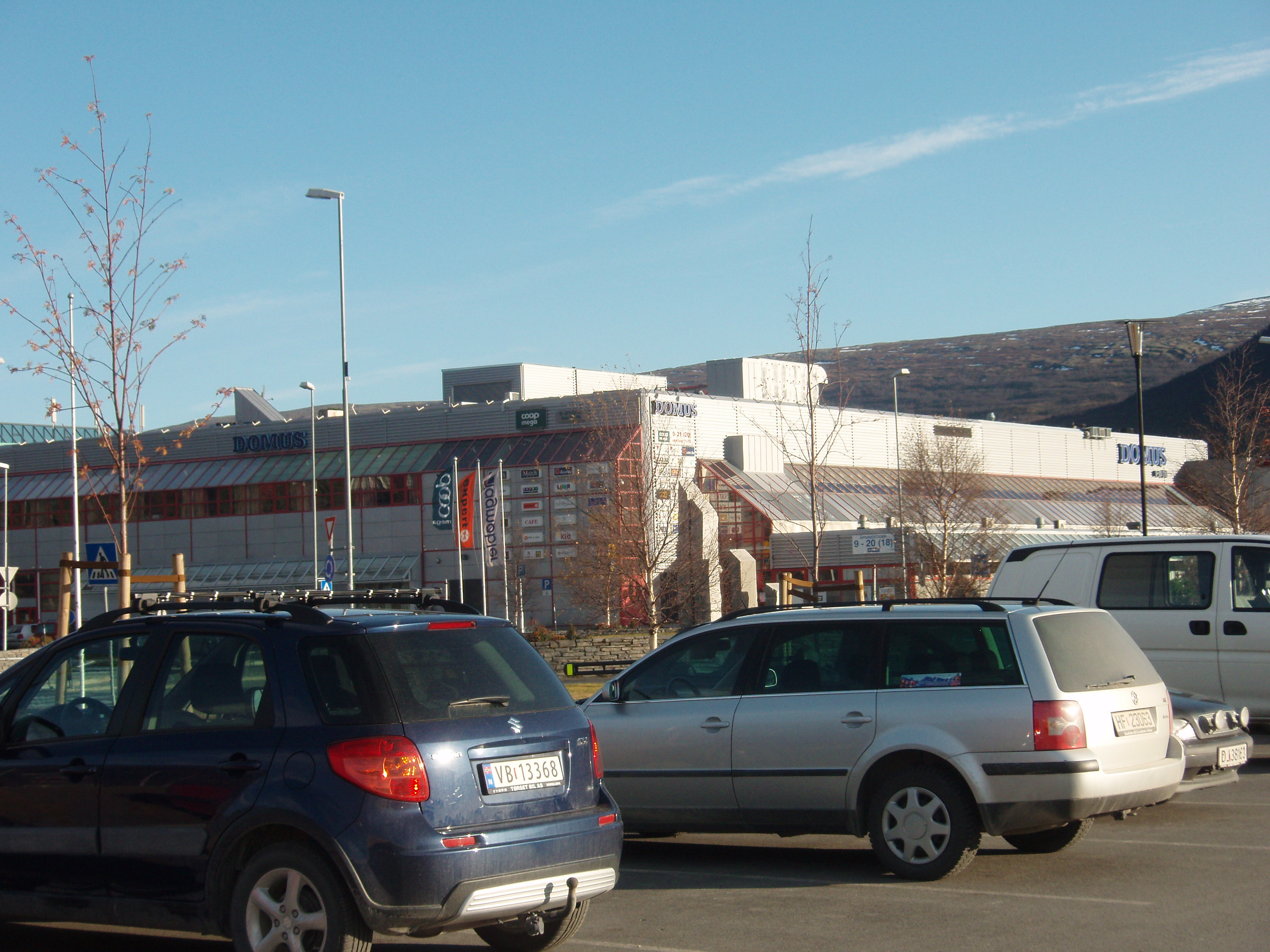
Domus shopping mall

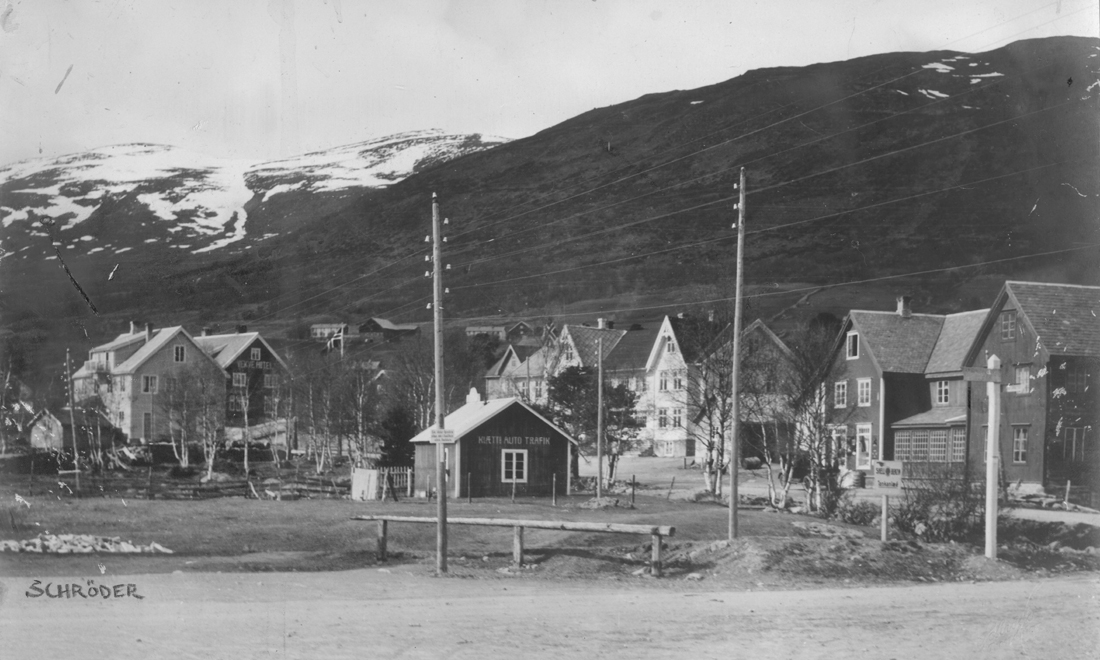
Historic photo of the centre of Oppdal

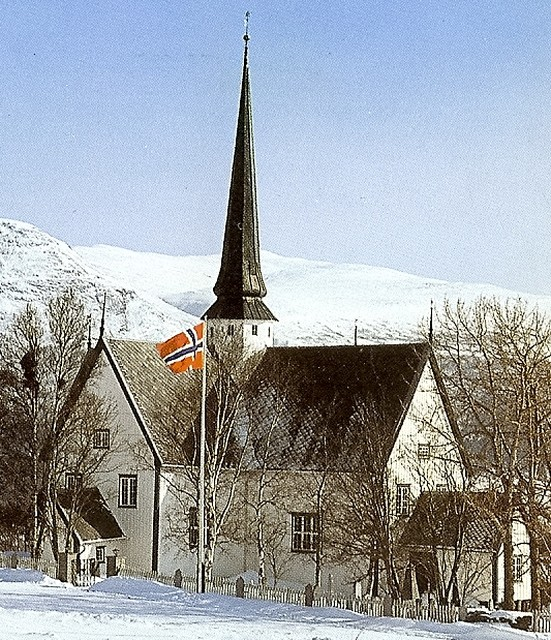
Oppdal Church

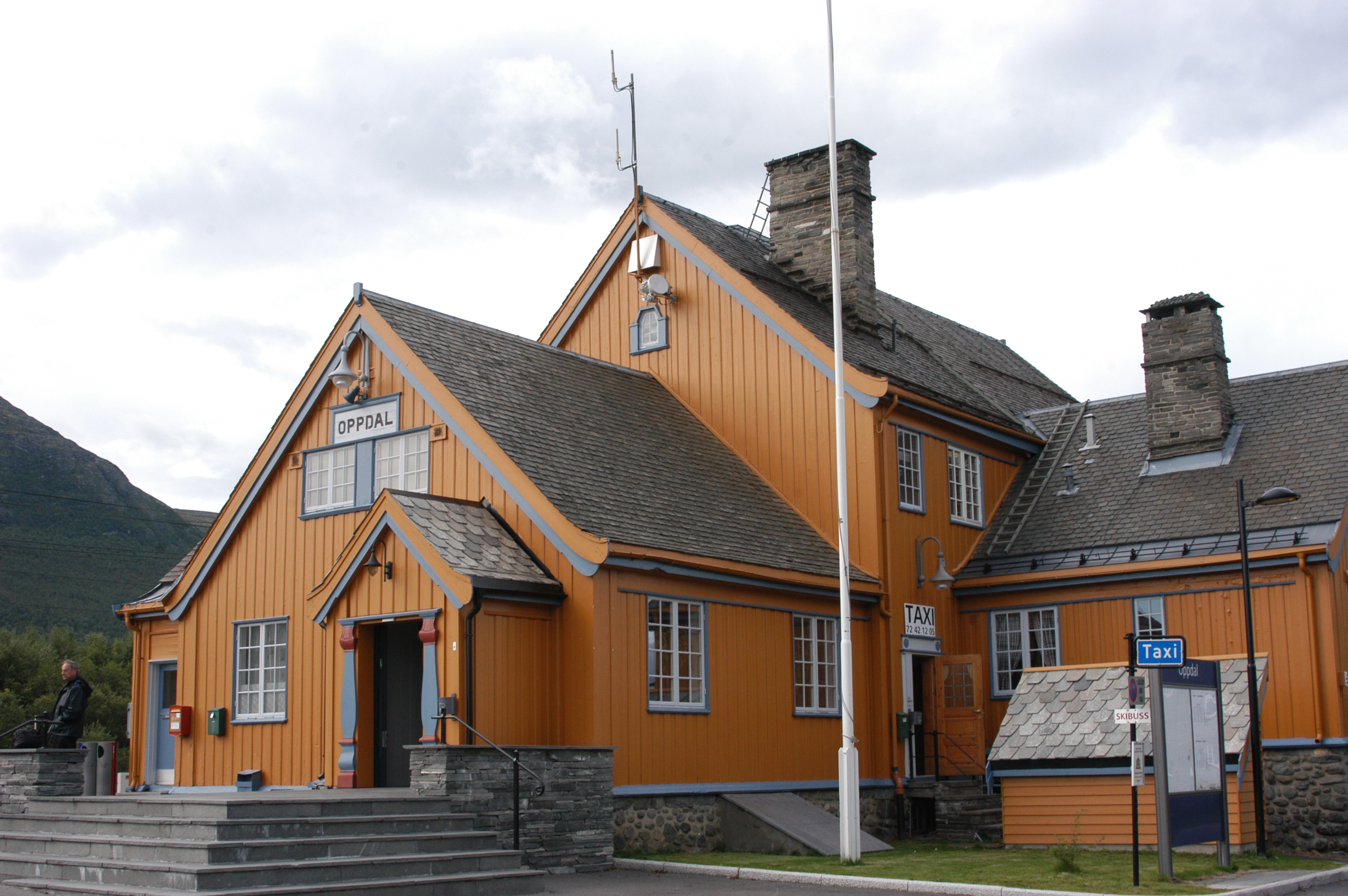
Oppdal Station
