= Skånevik Municipality =

Former municipality in Hordaland, Norway

Skånevik Municipality Skånevik herad
- Former municipality
- Skaanevik herred (historic name); Skonevig herred (historic name)
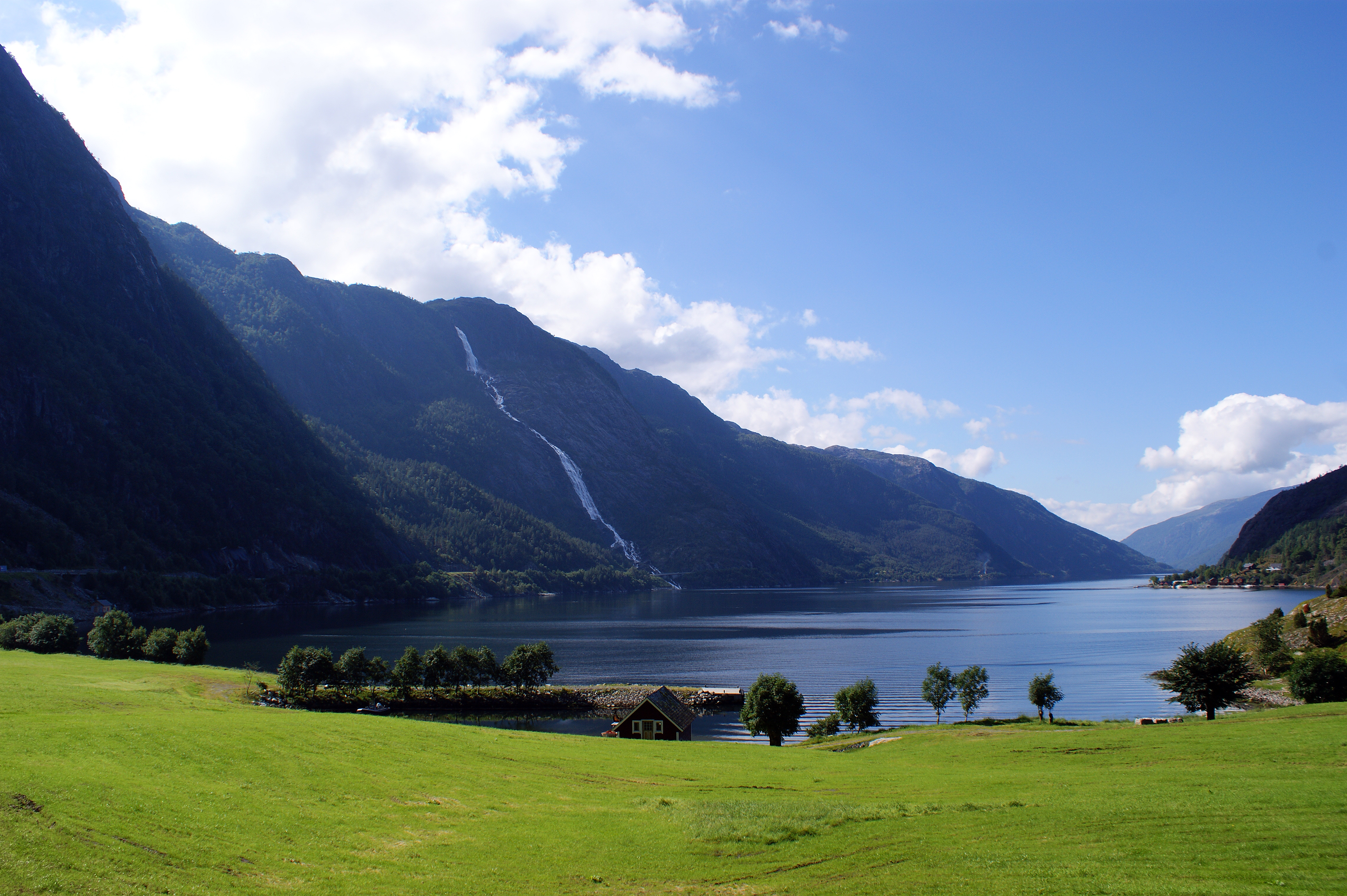
- View of the Åkrafjorden and the Langfossen waterfall

- Hordaland within Norway

- Skånevik within Hordaland
- Coordinates: 59°43′58″N 05°56′15″E
- Country: Norway
- County: Hordaland
- District: Sunnhordland
- Established: 1 Jan 1838
  - Created as: Formannskapsdistrikt
- Disestablished: 1 Jan 1965
  - Succeeded by: Kvinnherad and Etne municipalities
- Administrative centre: Skånevik

Government
  - Mayor (1962–1963): Ingvald Skålnes (V)

Area (upon dissolution)
  - Total: 589.6 km^{2} (227.6 sq mi)
  - Rank: #180 in Norway
- Highest elevation: 1,633 m (5,358 ft)

Population (1964)
  - Total: 2,705
  - Rank: #326 in Norway
  - Density: 4.6/km^{2} (12/sq mi)
  - Change (10 years): ▼ −6%
- Demonym: Skåneviksbu

Official language
  - Norwegian form: Nynorsk
- Time zone: UTC+01:00 (CET)
  - Summer (DST): UTC+02:00 (CEST)
- ISO 3166 code: NO-1212

Skånevik is a former municipality in the old Hordaland county, Norway. The 589.6-square-kilometre (227.6 sq mi) municipality existed from 1838 until its dissolution in 1965. The area is now divided between Kvinnherad Municipality and Etne Municipality in the traditional district of Sunnhordland in Vestland county. The administrative centre was the village of Skånevik. Other villages in the municipality included Fjæra, Åkra, and Ytre Matre.

Prior to its dissolution in 1965, the 589.6-square-kilometre (227.6 sq mi) municipality was the 180th largest by area out of the 525 municipalities in Norway. Skånevik Municipality was the 326th most populous municipality in Norway with a population of about 2,705. The municipality's population density was 4.6 inhabitants per square kilometre (12/sq mi) and its population had decreased by 6% over the previous 10-year period.

== General information ==
The parish of Skonevig was established as a municipality on 1 January 1838 (see formannskapsdistrikt law). The spelling of the name was changed in the early 20th century to its present spelling of Skånevik. On 1 January 1965, the municipality of Skånevik was dissolved due to the recommendations of the Schei Committee during a period of many municipal mergers across Norway. The lands of the old Skånevik Municipality were divided as follows:

- the areas situated south of the Skånevikfjord and Åkrafjorden, as well as the parts of Skånevik located north of the fjord and east of the village of Åkra (population: 1,493) became part of Etne Municipality to the south
- the areas lying north of the fjord and west of the village of Åkra (population: 1,189), became a part of Kvinnherad Municipality to the north

=== Name ===
The municipality (originally the parish) is named after the old Skaanevik farm (Old Norse: Skǫðinarvik) since the first Skånevik Church was built there. The meaning of the first element is uncertain. It may be the plura form of the word skaði which means "harm" or "danger". The last element is vin which means "meadow" or "pasture".

On 21 December 1917, a royal resolution enacted the 1917 Norwegian language reforms. Prior to this change, the name was spelled Skaanevik with the digraph "aa", and after this reform, the name was spelled Skånevik, using the letter å instead.

=== Churches ===
The Church of Norway had three parishes (sokn) within Skånevik Municipality. At the time of the municipal dissolution, it was part of the Skånevik prestegjeld and the Søndre Sunnhordland prosti (deanery) in the Diocese of Bjørgvin.

Churches in Skånevik Municipality
Parish (sokn)	Church name	Location of the church	Year built
Åkra	Åkra Church	Åkra	1735
Åkra	Fjæra Chapel	Fjæra	1913
Holmedal	Holmedal Church	Utåker	1815
Skånevik	Skånevik Church	Skånevik	1900

== Geography ==
The municipality included the land surrounding both sides of the Skånevikfjorden and its smaller branches: the Åkrafjorden and Matersfjorden. It also included the eastern part of the island of Halsnøya and stretched quite a ways inland all the way to the Folgefonna glacier. The highest point in the municipality was the 1,633-metre (5,358 ft) tall peak at the top of the Søndre Folgefonna glacier. This point was a tripoint on the border of Skånevik Municipality, Kvinnherad Municipality, and Odda Municipality.

Kvinnherad Municipality was located to the north, Odda Municipality was located to the east, Sauda Municipality (in Rogaland county) was located to the southeast, Etne Municipality was located to the south, and Fjelberg Municipality was located to the west.

== Government ==
While it existed, Skånevik Municipality was responsible for primary education (through 10th grade), outpatient health services, senior citizen services, welfare and other social services, zoning, economic development, and municipal roads and utilities. The municipality was governed by a municipal council of directly elected representatives. The mayor was indirectly elected by a vote of the municipal council. The municipality was under the jurisdiction of the Gulating Court of Appeal.

=== Municipal council ===
The municipal council (Heradsstyre) of Skånevik Municipality was made up of 21 representatives that were elected to four year terms. The tables below show the historical composition of the council by political party.

Skånevik heradsstyre 1959–1963
Party name (in Nynorsk)	Number of representatives
Labour Party (Arbeidarpartiet)	5
Conservative Party (Høgre)	3
Christian Democratic Party (Kristeleg Folkeparti)	4
Centre Party (Senterpartiet)	2
Liberal Party (Venstre)	3
Local List(s) (Lokale lister)	4
Total number of members:	21
Note: On 1 January 1964, Skånevik Municipality was divided between Kvinnherad Municipality and Etne Municipality.

Skånevik heradsstyre 1955–1959
Party name (in Nynorsk)	Number of representatives
Labour Party (Arbeidarpartiet)	2
Conservative Party (Høgre)	1
Farmers' Party (Bondepartiet)	3
Liberal Party (Venstre)	1
List of workers, fishermen, and small farmholders (Arbeidarar, fiskarar, småbrukarar liste)	2
Local List(s) (Lokale lister)	12
Total number of members:	21

Skånevik heradsstyre 1951–1955
Party name (in Nynorsk)	Number of representatives
Labour Party (Arbeidarpartiet)	7
Conservative Party (Høgre)	2
Farmers' Party (Bondepartiet)	3
Liberal Party (Venstre)	2
Local List(s) (Lokale lister)	22
Total number of members:	36

Skånevik heradsstyre 1947–1951
Party name (in Nynorsk)	Number of representatives
Labour Party (Arbeidarpartiet)	9
Conservative Party (Høgre)	2
Farmers' Party (Bondepartiet)	4
Liberal Party (Venstre)	2
Local List(s) (Lokale lister)	19
Total number of members:	36

Skånevik heradsstyre 1945–1947
Party name (in Nynorsk)	Number of representatives
Labour Party (Arbeidarpartiet)	7
Conservative Party (Høgre)	2
Farmers' Party (Bondepartiet)	2
Liberal Party (Venstre)	3
List of workers, fishermen, and small farmholders (Arbeidarar, fiskarar, småbrukarar liste)	2
Local List(s) (Lokale lister)	20
Total number of members:	36

Skånevik heradsstyre 1937–1941*
Party name (in Nynorsk)	Number of representatives
Labour Party (Arbeidarpartiet)	8
Conservative Party (Høgre)	2
Farmers' Party (Bondepartiet)	3
Liberal Party (Venstre)	5
Local List(s) (Lokale lister)	18
Total number of members:	36
Note: Due to the German occupation of Norway during World War II, no elections were held for new municipal councils until after the war ended in 1945.

=== Mayors ===
The mayor (Nynorsk: ordførar) of Skånevik Municipality was the political leader of the municipality and the chairperson of the municipal council. The following people have held this position:

- 1838–1839: Lars Lambrigtsen Skaalnæs
- 1840–1843: Rev. Christoffer Ellerhusen
- 1844–1845: Tollef Tollefsen Valdre
- 1846–1847: Lars Lambrigtsen Skaalnæs
- 1848–1851: Rev. Christoffer Ellerhusen
- 1852–1855: Lars Lambrigtsen Skaalnæs
- 1856–1857: Rev. Christoffer Ellerhusen
- 1858–1859: Johannes K. Vike
- 1860–1865: Ole Ludvigsen Tungesvik
- 1866–1867: Knud Torgersen Tungesvik
- 1868–1885: Lambrigt Skaalnæs
- 1886–1890: Rev. Peter Bøckman
- 1890–1895: Tjærand Sunde
- 1896–1910: Lars O. Tungesvik
- 1911–1916: Tjærand Sunde
- 1917–1941: Olav Tungesvik
- 1941–1945: Kristoffer Tungesvik
- 1945–1945: Olav Tungesvik
- 1946–1947: Arnfinn Matre
- 1947–1962: Kolbein Tjelle (H)
- 1962–1963: Ingvald Skålnes (V)

== See also ==
- List of former municipalities of Norway
