= Etne =

Etne may refer to:

== Places ==
- Etne Municipality, a municipality in Vestland county, Norway
- Etne, also known as Etnesjøen, a village within Etne Municipality in Vestland county, Norway
- Etne Church, a church in Etne Municipality in Vestland county, Norway
- Etne River, or Etneelva, a river in Etne Municipality in Vestland county, Norway
- Etne Fjord, or Etnefjorden, a fjord in Vestland county, Norway

== See also ==
- Etne (ship), a list of ships with the name Etne
