= Skånevik =

Skånevik may refer to:

== Places ==
- Skånevik (village), a village in Etne Municipality in Vestland county, Norway
- Skånevik Municipality, a former municipality in the old Hordaland county, Norway
- Skånevik Church, a church in Etne Municipality in Vestland county, Norway
- Skånevik Fjord, or Skånevikfjorden, a fjord in Sunnhordland, Norway

== Other ==
- Skånevik Blues Festival, an annual blues festival held in Etne Municipality in Vestland county, Norway
