= Eintveit Bridge =

Eintveit Bridge Eintveitbrua
- Coordinates: 59.8278°N 6.2088°E
- Carries: Nothing
- Crosses: Eintveitelva
- Locale: Etne Municipality

Characteristics
- Material: Concrete
- Total length: 25 metres (82 ft)

History
- Construction start: 1958
- Construction end: 1962
- Opened: Never

Statistics
- Daily traffic: None

Location
- Interactive map of Eintveit Bridge

The Eintveit Bridge (Norwegian: Eintveitbrua) is an unused road bridge in Etne Municipality in Vestland county, Norway. Access roads were never built to it, and the bridge has stood secluded and without traffic since it was erected. The bridge of concrete is approximately 25 metres (82 ft) long and has two lanes. It goes over the river Eintveitelva between the now-abandoned small farms of Eintveit and Bjelland.

== History ==
In 1956 the area was a part of Skånevik Municipality (later merging with Etne Municipality), and in that year the municipal council allocated money to build a bridge across the Eintveitelva with access roads, as part of a larger road project that would follow the coastline along the northern side of the Åkrafjorden. The bridge would have been so broad that buses could drive at speeds of up to 40 kilometres per hour (25 mph) on it. Construction of the bridge began in 1958 and the bridge was completed in 1962. The road along the fjord was never built, and the bridge was never used by anyone other than random hikers. Since the road was not built, all of the small farms along that area of the fjord eventually became abandoned. The bridge falls into the "bridge to nowhere" category.

In 2014, broadcaster NRK organized the "opening" of the bridge. Two cars were flown in by helicopter and driven across the bridge.
