= Rullestad Tunnel =

Highway tunnel in Norway

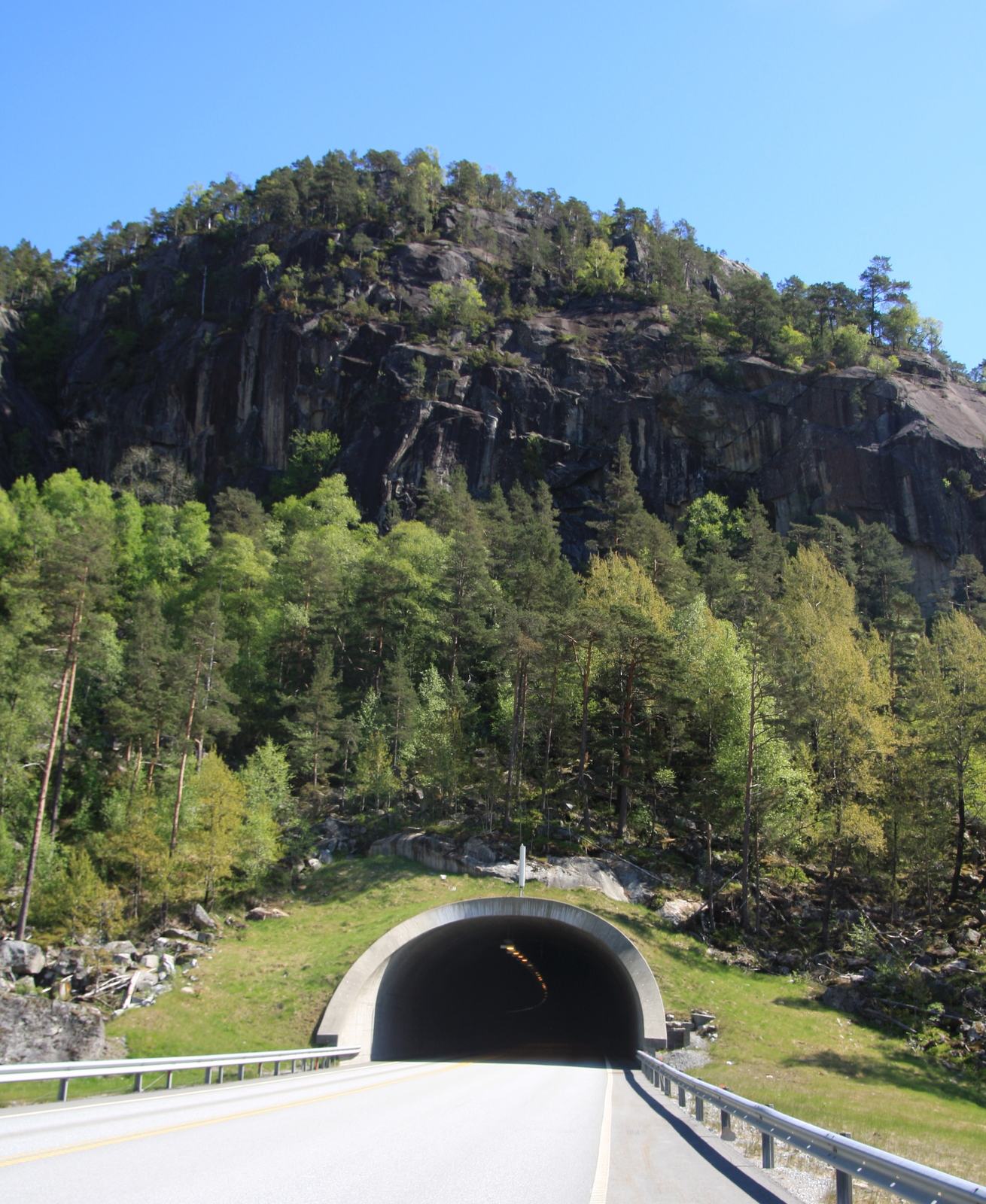
- View of the tunnel entrance (photo: Jarle Vines)
- Interactive map of Rullestad Tunnel

Overview
- Location: Vestland, Norway
- Coordinates: 59.8800°N 6.4483°E
- Status: In use
- Route: E134
- Start: Rullestad, Etne Municipality
- End: Langebu, Etne

Operation
- Work began: Aug 2004
- Opened: 30 June 2006
- Operator: Norwegian Public Roads Administration
- Character: Automotive

Technical
- Length: 2,920 metres (1.81 mi)
- Grade: 6.6%

The Rullestad Tunnel (Norwegian: Rullestadtunnelen) is a road tunnel in Etne Municipality in Vestland county, Norway. The 2,920-metre (9,580 ft) long tunnel is located on the European route E134 highway, about 4 kilometres (2.5 mi) east of the village of Fjæra and about 9 kilometres (5.6 mi) southwest of the village of Skare in neighboring Ullensvang Municipality. The tunnel opened on 30 June 2006 to replace a narrow, winding mountain road that included some hairpin turns. The new tunnel has a maximum grade of 6.6%.
