= Åkrafjord Tunnel =

Norwegian tunnel

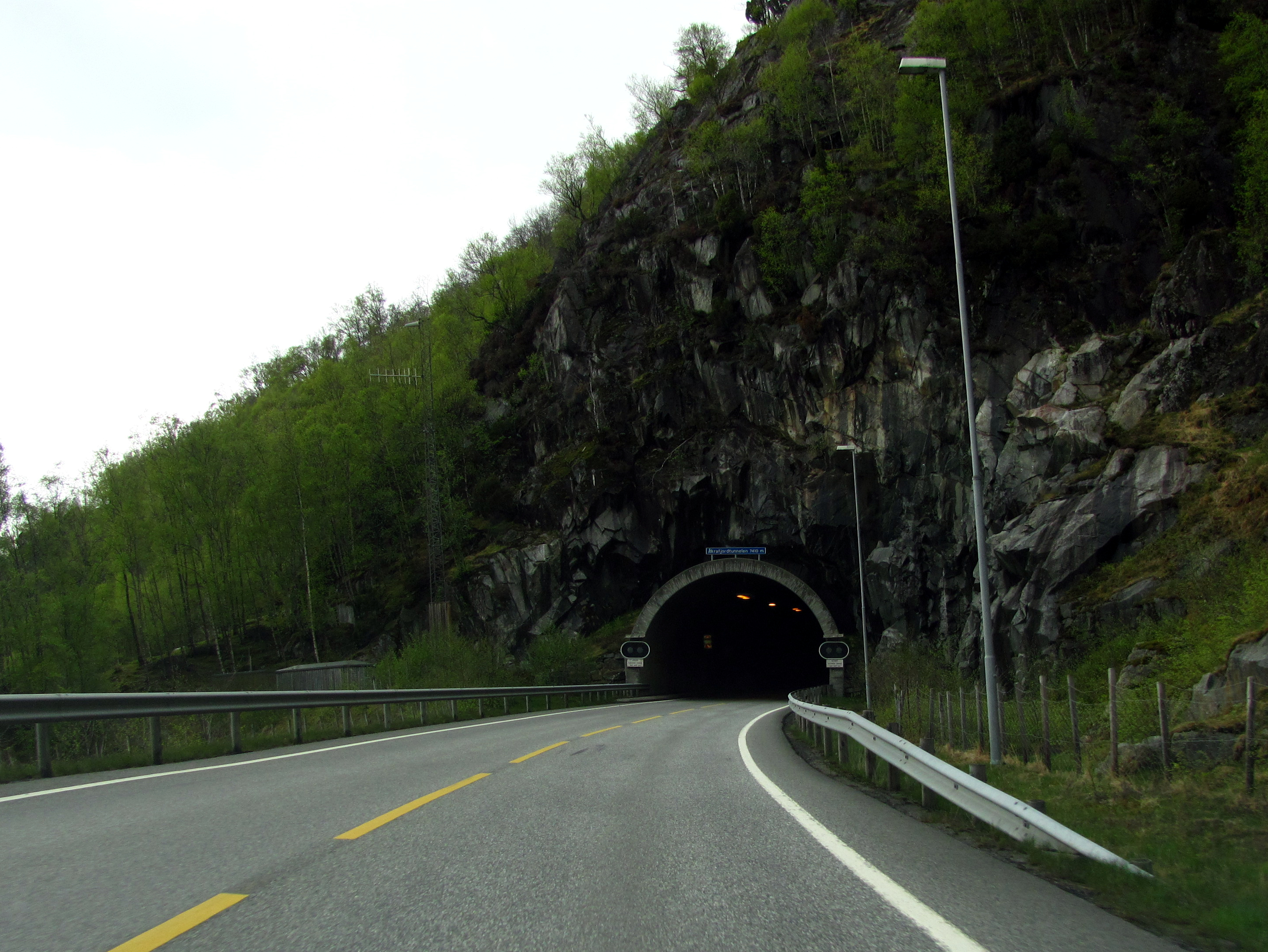
- View of the entrance to the tunnel
- Interactive map of Åkrafjord Tunnel

Overview
- Location: Vestland, Norway
- Coordinates: 59.7744°N 6.1711°E
- Status: In use
- Route: E134
- Start: Krokstad, Etne Municipality
- End: Sævareid, Etne

Operation
- Opened: 15 July 2000
- Operator: Norwegian Public Roads Administration

Technical
- Length: 7,404 metres (24,291 ft)

The Åkrafjord Tunnel (Norwegian: Åkrafjordtunnelen) is a road tunnel in Etne Municipality in Vestland county, Norway. The 7,404-metre (4.6 mi) long tunnel is located on the European route E134 highway, on the southeastern side of the Åkrafjorden, about 15 kilometres (9.3 mi) northeast of the village of Etnesjøen. The tunnel was opened on 15 July 2000 to replace a narrow and winding road on the narrow shoreline between the fjord and the steep mountainsides.
