= List of Norwegian fjords =

This list of Norwegian fjords shows many of the fjords in Norway. In total, there are about 1,190 fjords in Norway and the Svalbard islands. The sortable list includes the lengths and locations of those fjords.

== Fjords ==
Name of fjord	Length (km/mi)	County	Municipality	Coordinates
Adventfjorden	4 km (2.5 mi)	Svalbard	Spitsbergen	78.2585°N 15.5535°E
Altafjorden	38 km (24 mi)	Finnmark	Alta	69.990°N 23.3242°E
Arasvikfjord	12 km (7.5 mi)	Møre og Romsdal and Trøndelag	Aure and Heim	63.1505°N 8.4186°E
Astafjorden	30 km (19 mi)	Troms	Tjeldsund	68.7875°N 17.2445°E
Austefjorden	11 km (6.8 mi)	Møre og Romsdal	Volda	62.0853°N 6.1504°E
Austfjorden (Svalbard)	32 km (20 mi)	Svalbard	Spitsbergen	79.0638°N 16.1578°E
Austfjorden (Vestland)	20 km (12 mi)	Vestland	Alver and Masfjorden	60.7227°N 5.3651°E
Austnesfjorden	13 km (8.1 mi)	Nordland	Vågan	68.296°N 14.718°E
Badderfjord	5 km (3.1 mi)	Troms	Kvænangen	69.8533°N 21.9720°E
Balsfjorden	57 km (35 mi)	Troms	Balfjord and Tromsø	69.3112°N 19.3464°E
Batnfjord	10 km (6.2 mi)	Møre og Romsdal	Gjemnes	62.9064°N 7.7016°E
Beitstadfjorden	28 km (17 mi)	Trøndelag	Inderøy and Steinkjer	63.9342°N 11.1079°E
Bindalsfjorden	26 km (16 mi)	Nordland	Bindal	65.2070°N 12.1336°E
Billefjorden	30 km (19 mi)	Svalbard	Spitsbergen	78.5304°N 16.3070°E
Bjugnfjorden	14 km (8.7 mi)	Trøndelag	Ørland	63.7434°N 9.5786°E
Bjørnafjorden	32 km (20 mi)	Vestland	Austevoll, Bjørnafjorden, and Tysnes	60.0989°N 5.3851°E
Boknafjord	94 km (58 mi)	Rogaland	Kvitsøy, Stavanger, Tysvær, Bokn, and Karmøy	59.1193°N 5.4061°E
Breviksfjord	5 km (3.1 mi)	Telemark	Bamble and Porsgrunn	59.0293°N 9.7351°E
Bunnefjorden	17 km (11 mi)	Akershus and Oslo	Frogn, Nesodden, Nordre Follo, Oslo, and Ås	59.7446°N 10.7221°E
Byfjorden (Vestland)	14 km (8.7 mi)	Vestland	Askøy and Bergen	60.4233°N 5.2682°E
Byfjorden (Rogaland)	10 km (6.2 mi)	Rogaland	Randaberg and Stavanger	58.9964°N 5.6931°E
Bøkfjord	22 km (14 mi)	Finnmark	Sør-Varanger	69.7429°N 30.0521°E
Bømlafjorden	31 km (19 mi)	Vestland	Bømlo, Stord, and Sveio	59.6303°N 5.3016°E
Dalsfjorden (Sunnmøre)	17 km (11 mi)	Møre og Romsdal	Volda	62.0912°N 5.9314°E
Dalsfjorden (Sunnfjord)	40 km (25 mi)	Vestland	Askvoll, Fjaler, and Sunnfjord	61.3523°N 5.2081°E
Dicksonfjorden	30 km (19 mi)	Svalbard	Spitsbergen	78.6413°N 15.3296°E
Drammensfjord	30 km (19 mi)	Buskerud	Drammen, Asker, Lier	59.7051°N 10.3133°E
Duvefjorden	35 km (22 mi)	Svalbard	Nordaustlandet	80.3672°N 23.6661°E
Edøyfjorden	26 km (16 mi)	Møre og Romsdal	Smøla and Aure	63.3064°N 8.2357°E
Eidangerfjord	6 km (3.7 mi)	Telemark	Porsgrunn	59.0719°N 9.7074°E
Eidsfjorden	30 km (19 mi)	Nordland	Sortland	68.6050°N 14.6646°E
Ekmanfjorden	18 km (11 mi)	Svalbard	Spitsbergen	78.6623°N 14.6167°E
Eresfjorden	10 km (6.2 mi)	Møre og Romsdal	Molde	62.7300°N 8.0641°E
Erfjorden	16 km (9.9 mi)	Rogaland	Hjelmeland and Suldal	59.3106°N 6.1753°E
Esefjorden	4 km (2.5 mi)	Vestland	Sogndal	61.2169°N 6.5085°E
Etnefjorden	8.5 km (5.3 mi)	Vestland	Etne	59.647°N 5.8232°E
Fanafjorden	8.5 km (5.3 mi)	Vestland	Bergen	60.2551°N 5.3131°E
Fannefjord	20 km (12 mi)	Møre og Romsdal	Molde	62.7410°N 7.3036°E
Finnøyfjord	14 km (8.7 mi)	Rogaland	Stavanger	59.1417°N 5.8813°E
Fisterfjord	11 km (6.8 mi)	Rogaland	Stavanger and Hjelmeland	59.1651°N 6.0227°E
Fognafjord	18 km (11 mi)	Rogaland	Stavanger and Strand	59.1235°N 5.9347°E
Folda, Nordland	18 km (11 mi)	Nordland	Bodø and Steigen	67.5893°N 14.8944°E
Folda, Trøndelag	75 km (47 mi)	Trøndelag	Flatanger, Namsos, and Nærøysund	64.6817°N 11.0976°E
Forfjord	6.5 km (4.0 mi)	Nordland	Andøy and Sortland	68.8344°N 15.5742°E
Fossingfjord	3 km (1.9 mi)	Telemark	Bamble and Kragerø	68.8344°N 15.5742°E
Freifjorden	14 km (8.7 mi)	Møre og Romsdal	Gjemnes, Kristiansund, and Tingvoll	63.0466°N 7.8862°E
Frierfjord	14 km (8.7 mi)	Telemark	Bamble, Skien, Porsgrunn	59.0993°N 9.6184°E
Frænfjorden	12 km (7.5 mi)	Møre og Romsdal	Hustadvika	62.8308°N 7.0012°E
Frøyfjorden	25 km (16 mi)	Trøndelag	Frøya and Hitra	63.6301°N 8.4074°E
Fusafjorden	12 km (7.5 mi)	Vestland	Bjørnafjorden	60.2225°N 5.5658°E
Fættenfjord	2 km (1.2 mi)	Trøndelag	Levanger and Stjørdal	63.5593°N 10.9252°E
Førdefjorden	36 km (22 mi)	Vestland	Askvoll, Kinn, and Sunnfjord	61.4823°N 5.3086°E
Gandsfjord	15 km (9.3 mi)	Rogaland	Sandnes and Stavanger	58.8902°N 5.7630°E
Gapafjord	6 km (3.7 mi)	Rogaland	Stavanger	59.2645°N 5.9078°E
Gardssundfjord	32 km (20 mi)	Rogaland	Stavanger and Hjelmeland	59.2292°N 6.0313°E
Geirangerfjord	15 km (9.3 mi)	Møre og Romsdal	Stranda	62.1210°N 7.1290°E
Gratangen	20 km (12 mi)	Troms	Gratangen	68.7317°N 17.3697°E
Grimstadfjord	5.5 km (3.4 mi)	Vestland	Bergen	60.3228°N 5.2115°E
Grindafjord	11 km (6.8 mi)	Rogaland	Tysvær and Vindafjord	59.4405°N 5.4800°E
Grønfjorden	16 km (9.9 mi)	Svalbard	Spitsbergen	78.0328°N 14.1886°E
Gullesfjorden	35 km (22 mi)	Troms	Kvæfjord	68.6913°N 15.9933°E
Gunneklevfjord	2 km (1.2 mi)	Telemark	Porsgrunn	59.1223°N 9.6393°E
Hadselfjord	40 km (25 mi)	Nordland	Hadsel and Sortland	68.4729°N 14.7655°E
Halsafjord	15 km (9.3 mi)	Møre og Romsdal	Surnadal and Tingvoll	63.1158°N 8.1461°E
Hamnesfjord	9 km (5.6 mi)	Møre og Romsdal	Surnadal	62.9800°N 8.4521°E
Hardangerfjord	179 km (111 mi)	Vestland	Bømlo—Ullensvang	59.8095°N 5.6015°E
Hellemofjorden	29 km (18 mi)	Nordland	Hamarøy	67.9800°N 16.2376°E
Hemnfjorden	25 km (16 mi)	Trøndelag	Heim, Hitra, and Orkland	63.4512°N 9.0998°E
Herdlefjord	20 km (12 mi)	Vestland	Askøy and Alver	60.4944°N 5.2159°E
Herjangsfjord	10 km (6.2 mi)	Nordland	Narvik	68.4648°N 17.3615°E
Hervikfjord	38 km (24 mi)	Rogaland	Tysvær and Vindafjord	59.2870°N 5.6063°E
Herøyfjord	8 km (5.0 mi)	Møre og Romsdal	Herøy	62.3012°N 5.4897°E
Hidlefjord	13 km (8.1 mi)	Rogaland	Stavanger and Strand	59.0591°N 5.7946°E
Hjeltefjorden	46 km (29 mi)	Vestland	Aksøy, Fedje, Alver, and Øygarden	60.4425°N 5.0264°E
Hjørundfjorden	35 km (22 mi)	Møre og Romsdal	Sykkylven, Ørsta	62.2111°N 6.5145°E
Hornsund	30 km (19 mi)	Svalbard	Spitsbergen	76.9722°N 15.7181°E
Hyllestadfjorden	4 km (2.5 mi)	Vestland	Hyllestad	61.1774°N 5.2612°E
Hylsfjord	20 km (12 mi)	Rogaland	Suldal	59.5287°N 6.3681°E
Høgsfjorden	23 km (14 mi)	Rogaland	Gjesdal and Sandnes	58.9938°N 5.8162°E
Høyangsfjorden	8 km (5.0 mi)	Vestland	Høyanger	61.1861°N 6.0452°E
Håsteinsfjord	10 km (6.2 mi)	Rogaland	Kvitsøy, Randaberg, and Sola	58.9681°N 5.4141°E
Iddefjord	17 km (11 mi)	Østfold	Halden	58.9934°N 11.4595°E
Idsefjord	12 km (7.5 mi)	Rogaland	Strand	58.9931°N 5.9582°E
Indre Oslofjord	30 km (19 mi)	Akershus, Buskerud, Oslo, and Østfold	Asker—Oslo	59.8514°N 10.5887°E
Innværfjorden	3.5 km (2.2 mi)	Vestland	Bømlo	59.8024°N 5.2624°E
Isfjorden, Møre og Romsdal	6.5 km (4.0 mi)	Møre og Romsdal	Rauma	62.5769°N 7.7282°E
Isfjorden, Svalbard	107 km (66 mi)	Svalbard	Spitsbergen	78.2494°N 14.7804°E
Jarfjorden	21 km (13 mi)	Finnmark	Sør-Varanger	69.683458°N 30.426230°E
Jelsafjord	10 km (6.2 mi)	Rogaland	Stavanger, Hjelmeland, Suldal, and Tysvær	59.3163°N 6.0051°E
Jøsenfjorden	24 km (15 mi)	Rogaland	Hjelmeland	59.2642°N 6.1907°E
Jøssingfjorden	2.5 km (1.6 mi)	Rogaland	Sokndal	58.3194°N 6.3402°E
Kaldfjord	16 km (9.9 mi)	Troms	Tromsø	69.7694°N 18.6821°E
Kaldvågfjorden	16 km (9.9 mi)	Nordland	Hamarøy	68.0378°N 15.6589°E
Kilsfjord, Møre og Romsdal	3 km (1.9 mi)	Møre og Romsdal	Volda	62.0765°N 6.0843°E
Kilsfjord, Telemark	7 km (4.3 mi)	Telemark	Kragerø	58.8580°N 9.3301°E
Kobbefjorden	3.5 km (2.2 mi)	Svalbard	Danes Island	79.6945°N 10.8189°E
Kongsfjorden	26 km (16 mi)	Svalbard	Spitsbergen	78.9651°N 11.8569°E
Kornstadfjord	9 km (5.6 mi)	Møre og Romsdal	Averøy and Hustadvika	62.9665°N 7.4112°E
Krossfjorden	30 km (19 mi)	Svalbard	Spitsbergen	79.1225°N 11.6797°E
Kurefjorden	5 km (3.1 mi)	Østfold	Moss, Råde	59.3297°N 10.7384°E
Kvernesfjord	22 km (14 mi)	Møre og Romsdal	Averøy, Gjemnes, Hustadvika, and Kristiansund	63.0477°N 7.6822°E
Kvitsøyfjord	9 km (5.6 mi)	Rogaland	Kvitsøy, Randaberg, and Stavanger	59.0707°N 5.5630°E
Kvænangen	117 km (73 mi)	Troms	Kvænangen and Skjervøy	69.7462°N 22.0883°E
Kvåsefjorden	8 km (5.0 mi)	Agder	Kristiansand and Lillesand	58.1384°N 8.1896°E
Kåfjorden	8 km (5.0 mi)	Finnmark	Alta	69.9353°N 23.0454°E
Laksefjord	72 km (45 mi)	Finnmark	Lebesby	70.4732°N 26.6218°E
Langangsfjord	6 km (3.7 mi)	Telemark	Porsgrunn	59.0359°N 9.7885°E
Langfjorden	35 km (22 mi)	Møre og Romsdal	Molde and Rauma	62.6411°N 7.4159°E
Lavangen	16 km (9.9 mi)	Troms	Lavangen	68.7979°N 17.5905°E
Leirfjorden	20 km (12 mi)	Nordland	Leirfjord and Alstahaug	66.0297°N 12.6847°E
Liefdefjorden	30 km (19 mi)	Svalbard	Spitsbergen	79.6031°N 12.8789°E
Lille Kufjorden	2 km (1.2 mi)	Finnmark	Alta	70.3530°N 22.9704°E
Listafjord	10 km (6.2 mi)	Agder	Farsund and Flekkefjord	58.1943°N 6.6137°E
Lomfjorden	35 km (22 mi)	Svalbard	Spitsbergen	79.5148°N 17.8953°E
Lustrafjorden	40 km (25 mi)	Vestland	Luster	61.2409°N 7.3738°E
Lyngenfjorden	121 km (75 mi)	Troms	Kåfjord, Lyngen, Nordreisa, Skjervøy, and Storfjord	69.7797°N 20.3827°E
Lysakerfjorden	3 km (1.9 mi)	Akershus and Oslo	Bærum and Oslo	59.9029°N 10.6466°E
Lysefjorden	42 km (26 mi)	Rogaland	Sandnes and Strand	58.9405°N 6.1202°E
Magdalenefjorden	8 km (5.0 mi)	Svalbard	Spitsbergen	79.5652°N 10.8756°E
Malangen	60 km (37 mi)	Troms	Balsfjord, Senja, Målselv, and Tromsø	69.4171°N 18.4273°E
Maurangerfjord	12 km (7.5 mi)	Vestland	Kvinnherad	60.1093°N 6.1855°E
Mefjorden	8 km (5.0 mi)	Vestfold	Sandefjord	59.1219°N 10.2662°E
Melfjorden	32 km (20 mi)	Nordland	Rødøy	66.5156°N 13.6786°E
Meløyfjorden	10 km (6.2 mi)	Nordland	Meløy	66.7896°N 13.2957°E
Midtgulen	5.5 km (3.4 mi)	Vestland	Bremanger	61.7284°N 5.1752°E
Moldefjord	20 km (12 mi)	Møre og Romsdal	Molde	62.7003°N 7.0255°E
Namsfjorden	35 km (22 mi)	Trøndelag	Flatanger and Namsos	64.4984°N 11.1973°E
Norddalsfjord (Vestland)	17 km (11 mi)	Vestland	Kinn	61.6235°N 5.1574°E
Norddalsfjorden (Møre og Romsdal)	16 km (9.9 mi)	Møre og Romsdal	Fjord and Stranda	62.2779°N 7.2234°E
Nordefjorden	1.5 km (0.93 mi)	Finnmark	Hammerfest	70.4819°N 22.9621°E
Nordfjorden (Agder)	7 km (4.3 mi)	Agder	Risør	58.7431°N 9.1297°E
Nordfjorden (Vestland)	106 km (66 mi)	Vestland	Bremanger, Gloppen, Kinn, Stad, and Stryn	61.8963°N 5.2759°E
Nordgulfjorden	4 km (2.5 mi)	Vestland	Gulen	60.9912°N 5.1734°E
Nærøyfjord	18 km (11 mi)	Vestland	Aurland	60.8949°N 6.8595°E
Ofotfjord	78 km (48 mi)	Nordland and Troms	Evenes, Lødingen, Narvik, and Tjeldsund	68.4292°N 16.4827°E
Ombofjord	5.5 km (3.4 mi)	Rogaland	Stavanger	59.2321°N 5.9108°E
Orkdalsfjorden	17 km (11 mi)	Trøndelag	Orkland, Skaun, Trondheim	63.3481°N 9.9288°E
Ormefjord	5 km (3.1 mi)	Telemark	Porsgrunn	59.0413°N 9.7532°E
Osafjord	12 km (7.5 mi)	Vestland	Ulvik	60.5111°N 6.9276°E
Oslofjord	100 km (62 mi)	Akershus, Buskerud, Vestfold, and Østfold	Færder—Oslo	59.2150°N 10.6363°E
Osterfjorden	27 km (17 mi)	Vestland	Alver and Osterøy	60.5446°N 5.3180°E
Porsangerfjorden	123 km (76 mi)	Finnmark	Nordkapp and Porsanger	70.1983°N 25.0758°E
Puddefjorden	3.5 km (2.2 mi)	Vestland	Bergen	60.3921°N 5.2982°E
Ranfjorden	68 km (42 mi)	Nordland	Dønna, Hemnes, Leirfjord, Nesna, and Vefsn	66.1356°N 12.8422°E
Raudfjorden	20 km (12 mi)	Svalbard	Spitsbergen	79.7498°N 12.0534°E
Recherchefjorden	7 km (4.3 mi)	Svalbard	Spitsbergen	77.5181°N 14.6582°E
Revsbotn	20 km (12 mi)	Finnmark	Hammerfest and Måsøy	70.7026°N 24.4544°E
Rijpfjorden	40 km (25 mi)	Svalbard	Nordaustlandet	80.2075°N 22.1094°E
Rombaken	20 km (12 mi)	Nordland	Narvik	68.4595°N 17.5888°E
Romsdalsfjord	88 km (55 mi)	Møre og Romsdal	Haram, Molde, Rauma, and Vestnes	62.5536°N 7.4338°E
Rosfjorden	12 km (7.5 mi)	Agder	Lyngdal	58.0683°N 6.9921°E
Rovdefjord	13 km (8.1 mi)	Møre og Romsdal	Vanylven, Sande, Herøy, Ulstein, and Volda	62.1849°N 5.5559°E
Sagfjorden	29 km (18 mi)	Nordland	Hamarøy and Steigen	67.9564°N 15.5016°E
Salhusfjorden	4 km (2.5 mi)	Vestland	Bergen and Alver	60.5104°N 5.2556°E
Sandefjordsfjord	9 km (5.6 mi)	Vestfold	Sandefjord	59.0667°N 10.2454°E
Sandeidsfjord	9 km (5.6 mi)	Rogaland	Vindafjord	59.5089°N 5.8508°E
Sandnesfjorden	10 km (6.2 mi)	Agder	Risør	58.6932°N 09.1309°E
Sandsfjord	25 km (16 mi)	Rogaland	Suldal	59.4604°N 6.2151°E
Sassenfjorden	15 km (9.3 mi)	Svalbard	Spitsbergen	78.3767°N 16.4225°E
Saudafjorden	16 km (9.9 mi)	Rogaland	Sauda and Suldal	59.6242°N 6.3109°E
Selbjørnsfjorden	20 km (12 mi)	Vestland	Austevoll, Bømlo, and Stord	59.9508°N 5.0289°E
Sjona	26 km (16 mi)	Nordland	Lurøy, Nesna, and Rana	66.3032°N 13.2881°E
Skjerstadfjorden	32 km (20 mi)	Nordland	Bodø and Fauske	67.2286°N 15.1816°E
Skjoldafjord	15 km (9.3 mi)	Rogaland	Tysvær and Vindafjord	59.4943°N 5.5778°E
Skjomen	24 km (15 mi)	Nordland	Narvik	68.3039°N 17.2912°E
Skudenesfjord	15 km (9.3 mi)	Rogaland	Bokn, Karmøy, and Kvitsøy	59.1172°N 5.2561°E
Skånevikfjorden	15 km (9.3 mi)	Vestland, Rogaland	Etne, Kvinnherad, and Vindafjord	59.7266°N 5.7967°E
Snigsfjorden	3 km (1.9 mi)	Agder	Lindesnes	58.0471°N 7.2728°E
Snillfjorden	14 km (8.7 mi)	Trøndelag	Heim, Orkland	63.3690°N 9.3595°E
Sognefjord	205 km (127 mi)	Vestland	Luster—Solund	61.1586°N 7.2263°E
Solbergfjord	27 km (17 mi)	Troms	Dyrøy, Senja, and Sørreisa	69.1401°N 17.6599°E
Stavfjord	18 km (11 mi)	Vestland	Askvoll, Kinn	61.4604°N 5.0135°E
Stjørnfjord	20 km (12 mi)	Trøndelag	Indre Fosen and Ørland	63.7101°N 9.8638°E
Storfjorden, Møre og Romsdal	110 km (68 mi)	Møre og Romsdal	Hareid—Stranda	62.3973°N 6.9064°E
Storfjorden, Svalbard	132 km (82 mi)	Svalbard	Spitsbergen	77.8241°N 19.6806°E
Storfjorden, Troms	17 km (11 mi)	Troms	Lyngen	69.3533°N 20.0365°E
Sulafjorden	9 km (5.6 mi)	Møre og Romsdal	Hareid and Sula	62.3732°N 6.1347°E
Sunndalsfjord	17 km (11 mi)	Møre og Romsdal	Sunndal	62.7889°N 8.3285°E
Sunnylvsfjorden	25 km (16 mi)	Møre og Romsdal	Stranda	62.2242°N 7.0392°E
Sykkylvsfjorden	10 km (6.2 mi)	Møre og Romsdal	Sykkylven	62.3695°N 6.5575°E
Syvdsfjorden	10 km (6.2 mi)	Møre og Romsdal	Vanylven	62.0918°N 5.7296°E
Søndeledfjorden	15 km (9.3 mi)	Agder	Risør	58.7553°N 09.0709°E
Sørfjorden, Finnmark	4.5 km (2.8 mi)	Finnmark	Hasvik	70.3434°N 22.4635°E
Sørfjorden (Hardanger)	40 km (25 mi)	Vestland	Ullensvang	60.1839°N 6.5711°E
Sørfjorden (Osterøy)	30 km (19 mi)	Vestland	Osterøy and Vaksdal	60.5247°N 5.7115°E
Sørgul	4 km (2.5 mi)	Vestland	Bremanger	61.7227°N 5.1084°E
Tafjorden	12 km (7.5 mi)	Møre og Romsdal	Fjord	62.2877°N 7.3438°E
Talgjefjord	13 km (8.1 mi)	Rogaland	Stavanger	59.1200°N 5.8525°E
Tanafjord	70 km (43 mi)	Finnmark	Gamvik, Berlevåg, and Tana	70.8824°N 28.5078°E
Tempelfjorden	15 km (9.3 mi)	Svalbard	Spitsbergen	78.4024°N 17.0409°E
Tingvollfjorden	54 km (34 mi)	Møre og Romsdal	Gjemnes, Molde, Sunndal, and Tingvoll	62.8062°N 8.2677°E
Tjongsfjorden	17 km (11 mi)	Nordland	Rødøy	66.6815°N 13.3597°E
Tjuvfjorden	45 km (28 mi)	Svalbard	Edgeøya	77.4725°N 22.2894°E
Tomrefjorden	9 km (5.6 mi)	Møre og Romsdal	Vestnes	62.6235°N 6.9017°E
Topdalsfjorden	11 km (6.8 mi)	Agder	Kristiansand	58.1566°N 8.0469°E
Tresfjorden	12 km (7.5 mi)	Møre og Romsdal	Vestnes	62.5858°N 7.1257°E
Trollfjord	2 km (1.2 mi)	Nordland	Hadsel	68.3628°N 14.9361°E
Trondheimsfjord	130 km (81 mi)	Trøndelag	Orkland—Steikjer	63.8192°N 11.1078°E
Trongfjord	4 km (2.5 mi)	Møre og Romsdal	Surnadal and Tingvoll	62.9818°N 8.3132°E
Trænfjorden	25 km (16 mi)	Nordland	Lurøy and Træna	66.4184°N 12.1335°E
Tysfjorden	59 km (37 mi)	Nordland	Hamarøy and Narvik	68.1851°N 16.1784°E
Tyssefjord	4 km (2.5 mi)	Rogaland	Suldal	59.3747°N 6.2220°E
Ullsfjord, Finnmark	5.5 km (3.4 mi)	Finnmark	Loppa	70.2930°N 21.9730°E
Ullsfjord, Troms	110 km (68 mi)	Troms	Lyngen and Tromsø	69.7047°N 19.7206°E
Valsøyfjorden	8 km (5.0 mi)	Møre og Romsdal	Heim	63.1212°N 8.5965°E
Van Keulenfjorden	30 km (19 mi)	Svalbard	Spitsbergen	77.5578°N 15.4283°E
Van Mijenfjorden	83 km (52 mi)	Svalbard	Spitsbergen	77.7800°N 15.4087°E
Vanylvsfjorden	30 km (19 mi)	Møre og Romsdal, Vestland	Vanylven, Stad, Sande	62.0944°N 5.563°E
Varangerfjord	100 km (62 mi)	Finnmark	Nesseby, Sør-Varanger, Vadsø, and Vardø	70.0911°N 29.0091°E
Vartdalsfjord	20 km (12 mi)	Møre og Romsdal	Hareid, Ulstein, and Ørsta	62.3120°N 6.0565°E
Vatsfjord	5 km (3.1 mi)	Rogaland	Vindafjord	59.4671°N 5.7404°E
Vefsnfjorden	51 km (32 mi)	Nordland	Alstahaug, Leirfjord, and Vefsn	65.9047°N 12.6106°E
Vegafjorden	22 km (14 mi)	Nordland	Brønnøy and Vega	65.4786°N 11.7903°E
Velfjorden	31 km (19 mi)	Nordland	Brønnøy and Vevelstad	65.5442°N 12.3389°E
Vestfjorden	155 km (96 mi)	Nordland	Værøy—Narvik	67.6407°N 12.9192°E
Vestfjorden, Nordkapp	6.5 km (4.0 mi)	Finnmark	Nordkapp	71.1253°N 25.7943°E
Vetlefjorden	6 km (3.7 mi)	Vestland	Sogndal	61.2720°N 6.5515°E
Vindafjorden	18 km (11 mi)	Rogaland	Suldal, Tysvær, and Vindafjord	59.4612°N 6.0247°E
Vinjefjorden	53 km (33 mi)	Møre og Romsdal and Trøndelag	Aure, Heim, Kristiansund, and Tingvoll	63.1730°N 8.5643°E
Voldsfjorden	18 km (11 mi)	Møre og Romsdal	Volda	62.2102°N 5.8594°E
Værangfjorden	15 km (9.3 mi)	Nordland	Rødøy	66.5867°N 13.1839°E
Wahlenbergfjorden	46 km (29 mi)	Svalbard	Spitsbergen	79.7443°N 20.7771°E
Wijdefjorden	108 km (67 mi)	Svalbard	Spitsbergen	79.6289°N 15.4500°E
Woodfjorden	64 km (40 mi)	Svalbard	Spitsbergen	79.7384°N 14.0890°E
Yrkefjorden	12 km (7.5 mi)	Rogaland	Tysvær and Vindafjord	59.4120°N 5.7153°E
Ytre Oslofjord	67 km (42 mi)	Buskerud, Vestfold, and Østfold	Færder—Asker	59.3338°N 10.5620°E
Øksfjorden (Loppa)	23 km (14 mi)	Finnmark	Loppa	70.1880°N 22.2969°E
Øksfjorden (Lødingen)	24 km (15 mi)	Nordland	Lødingen	68.3781°N 15.3215°E
Økstrafjorden	6 km (3.7 mi)	Rogaland	Suldal	59.3507°N 6.0950°E
Åfjorden	67 km (42 mi)	Trøndelag	Åfjord	63.9190°N 10.0739°E
Åkrafjorden	32 km (20 mi)	Vestland	Etne and Kvinnherad	59.7476°N 5.9983°E
Åmøyfjord	4 km (2.5 mi)	Rogaland	Stavanger	59.0204°N 5.6925°E
Årdalsfjord	16 km (9.9 mi)	Vestland	Årdal	61.2270°N 7.6834°E

== See also ==
- List of glaciers in Norway
- Geography of Norway
