= Markhus Tunnel =

Road tunnel in Norway

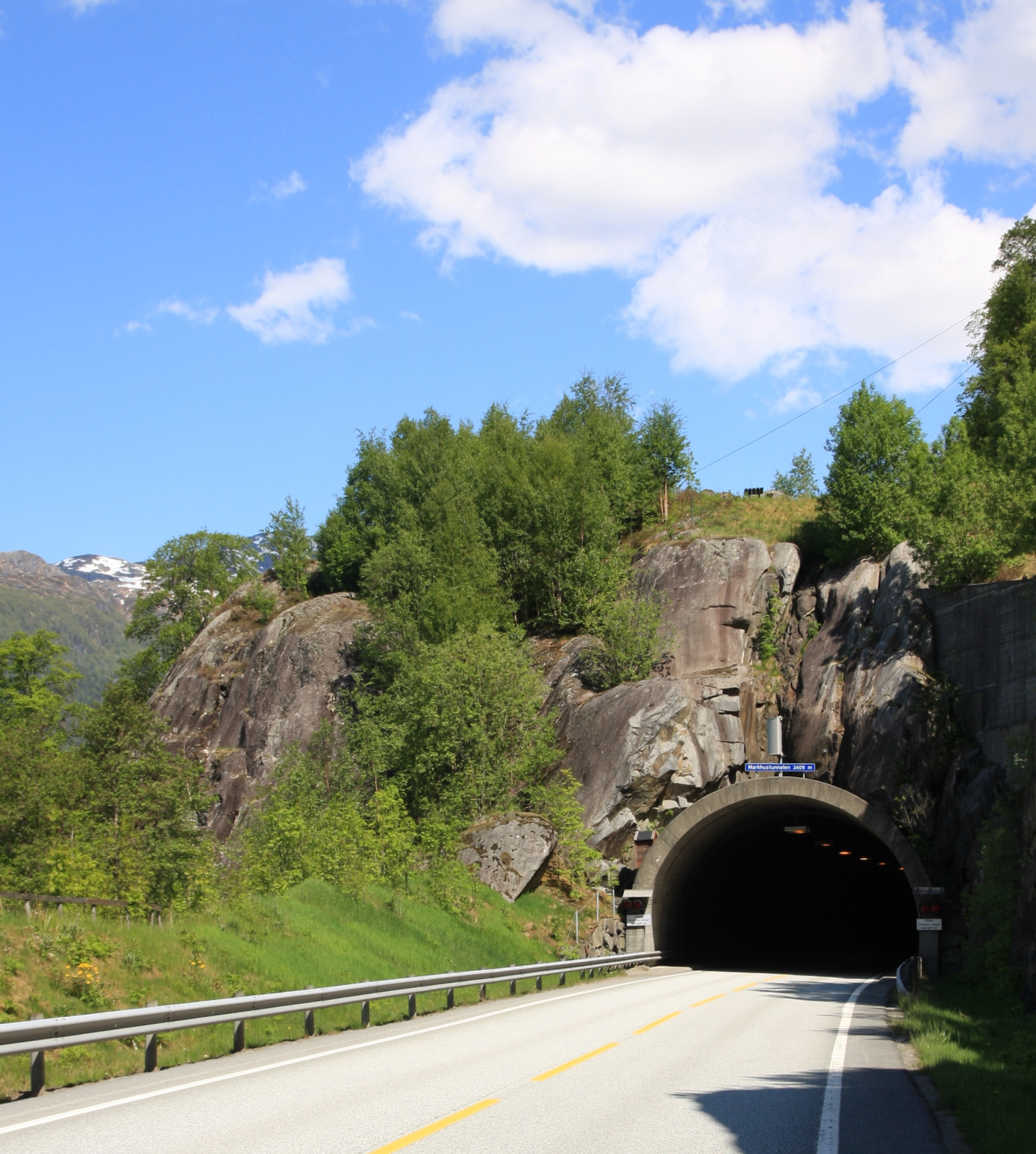
- View of the tunnel entrance
- Interactive map of Markhus Tunnel

Overview
- Location: Vestland, Norway
- Coordinates: 59.8189°N 6.2353°E
- Status: In use
- Route: E134
- Start: Krokstød, Etne Municipality
- End: Skålnes, Etne Municipality

Operation
- Opened: 1995
- Operator: Norwegian Public Roads Administration

Technical
- Length: 2,405 metres (7,890 ft)

The Markhus Tunnel (Norwegian: Markhustunnelen) is a road tunnel in Etne Municipality in Vestland county, Norway. The 2,405-metre (7,890 ft) long tunnel is located on the European route E134 highway on the southern shore of the Åkrafjorden, about 10 kilometres (6.2 mi) southwest of the village of Fjæra. The tunnel was opened in 1995 to replace a narrow, winding road that goes through a small residential area. The tunnel gave a wider, straighter road that meets official standards for highways.
