= Fjæra Chapel =

Church in Vestland, Norway

- Fjæra kapell
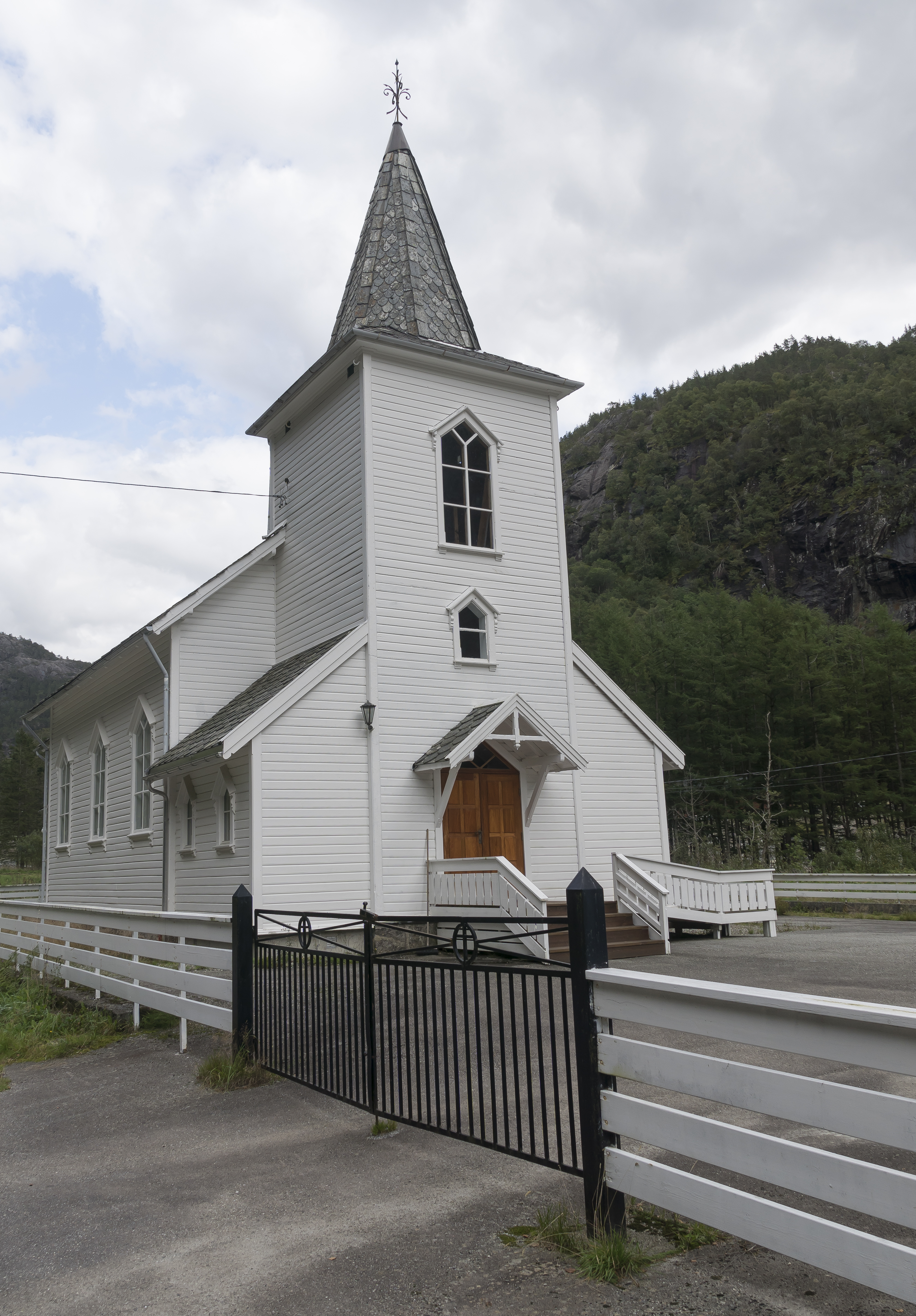
- View of the church
- Fjæra Chapel
- 59°52′31″N 6°23′17″E
- Location: Etne Municipality, Vestland
- Country: Norway
- Denomination: Church of Norway
- Churchmanship: Evangelical Lutheran

History
- Status: Parish church
- Founded: 1913
- Consecrated: 1913

Architecture
- Functional status: Active
- Architect: Hartvig Sverdrup Eckhoff
- Architectural type: Long church
- Completed: 1913 (113 years ago)

Specifications
- Capacity: 150
- Materials: Wood

Administration
- Diocese: Bjørgvin bispedømme
- Deanery: Sunnhordland prosti
- Parish: Skånevik
- Norwegian Cultural Heritage Site
- Type: Church
- Status: Not protected
- ID: 84151

Fjæra Chapel (Norwegian: Fjæra kapell) is a parish church of the Church of Norway in Etne Municipality in Vestland county, Norway. It is located in the village of Fjæra at the innermost end of the Åkrafjorden. It is one of the churches for the Skånevik parish which is part of the Sunnhordland prosti (deanery) in the Diocese of Bjørgvin. The white, wooden church was built in a long church design in 1913 using plans drawn up by the architect Hartvig Sverdrup Eckhoff. The church seats about 150 people.

== History ==
The chapel was built in 1912–1913 to serve the people living around the inner part of the Åkrafjorden. It has a nave with a choir and sacristy on the east end and a church porch with a tower above on the west end. The church was restored and renovated in 1968. In 1973, a small bathroom building was constructed right next to the chapel.

== See also ==
- List of churches in Bjørgvin
