= Fjæra Tunnel =

Road tunnel in Norway

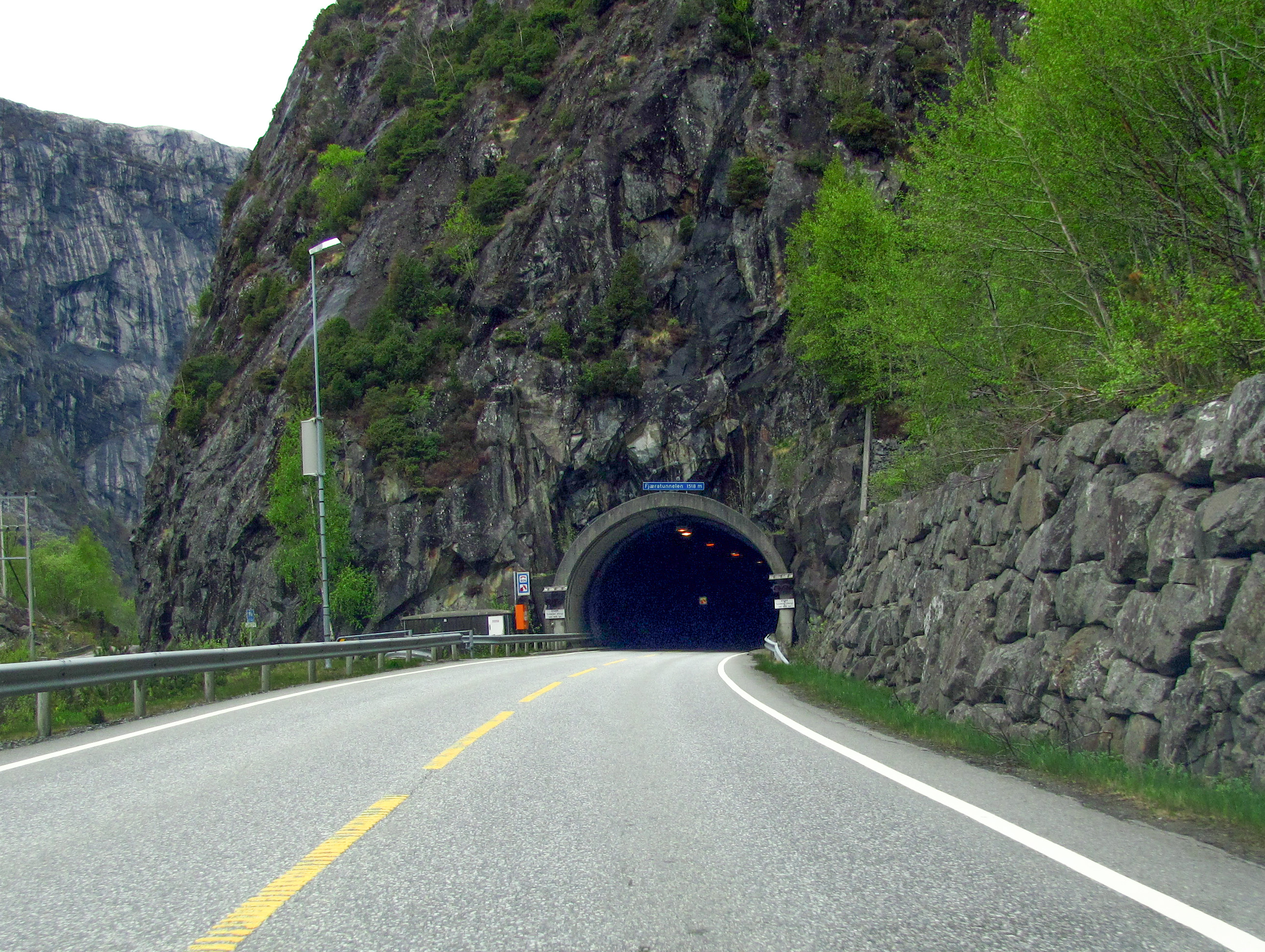
- View of the entrance to the tunnel
- Interactive map of Fjæra Tunnel

Overview
- Location: Vestland, Norway
- Coordinates: 59.8671°N 6.3721°E
- Status: In use
- Route: E134
- Start: Fjæra, Etne Municipality
- End: Eljarvika, Etne

Operation
- Opened: 1992
- Operator: Norwegian Public Roads Administration
- Character: Automotive

Technical
- Length: 1,518 metres (4,980 ft)

The Fjæra Tunnel (Norwegian: Fjæratunnelen) is a road tunnel that is situated in the Etne Municipality in Vestland county, Norway. The 1,518-metre (4,980 ft) long tunnel is located on the European route E134 highway, just southwest of the village of Fjæra. The tunnel was built in 1992 to replace the narrow, winding road that ran between the shore of the Åkrafjorden and the base of the steep mountains.
