= Etne Municipality =

Municipality in Vestland, Norway

Etne Municipality Etne kommune
- Municipality
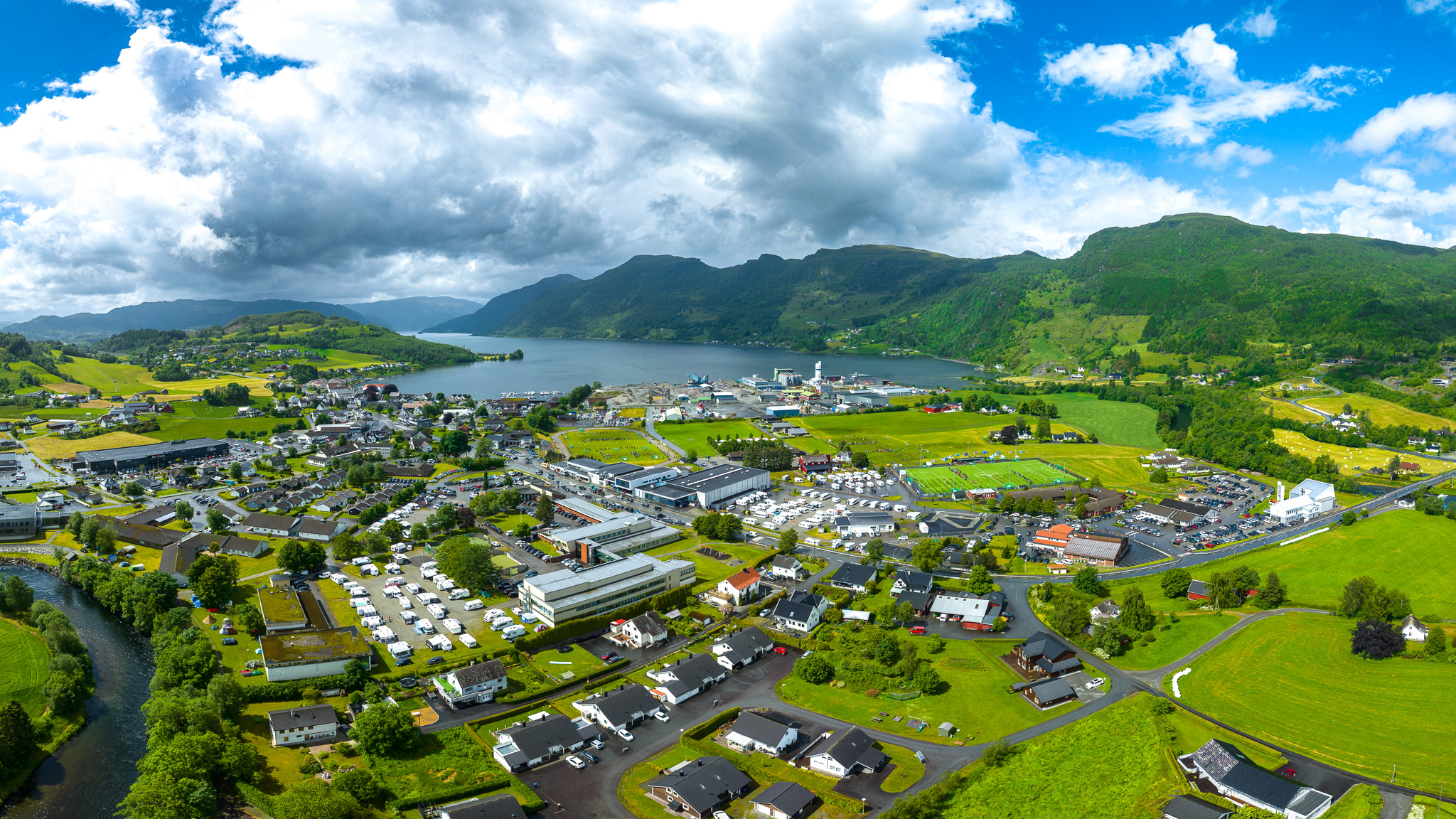
- Panorama of village Etne

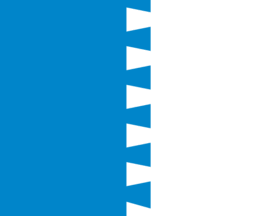
- Flag Coat of arms

- Vestland within Norway

- Etne within Vestland
- Coordinates: 59°39′50″N 05°56′00″E
- Country: Norway
- County: Vestland
- District: Sunnhordland
- Established: 1 Jan 1838
  - Created as: Formannskapsdistrikt
- Administrative centre: Etnesjøen

Government
  - Mayor (2019): Mette Heidi Bergsvåg Ekrheim (Sp)

Area
  - Total: 735.28 km^{2} (283.89 sq mi)
  - Land: 691.22 km^{2} (266.88 sq mi)
  - Water: 44.06 km^{2} (17.01 sq mi) 6%
  - Rank: #154 in Norway
- Highest elevation: 1,633 m (5,358 ft)

Population (2025)
  - Total: 4,093
  - Rank: #201 in Norway
  - Density: 5.6/km^{2} (15/sq mi)
  - Change (10 years): ▲ +0.4%
- Demonym(s): Etnebu; Etnesbu

Official language
  - Norwegian form: Nynorsk
- Time zone: UTC+01:00 (CET)
  - Summer (DST): UTC+02:00 (CEST)
- ISO 3166 code: NO-4611
- Website: Official website

Etne is a municipality in Vestland county, Norway. It is located in the traditional district of Sunnhordland, although it is also sometimes considered to be part of the district of Haugaland. The administrative centre of the municipality is the village of Etnesjøen. Other villages in the municipality include Skånevik and Fjæra. Etne Municipality is situated south of the city of Bergen, along the border with Rogaland county.

The 735.28-square-kilometre (283.89 sq mi) municipality is the 154th largest by area out of the 357 municipalities in Norway. Etne Municipality is the 201st most populous municipality in Norway with a population of 4,093. The municipality's population density is 5.6 inhabitants per square kilometre (15/sq mi) and its population has increased by 0.4% over the previous 10-year period.

A Norwegian motion picture called United was shot in Etne Municipality with local people as actors.

== General information ==
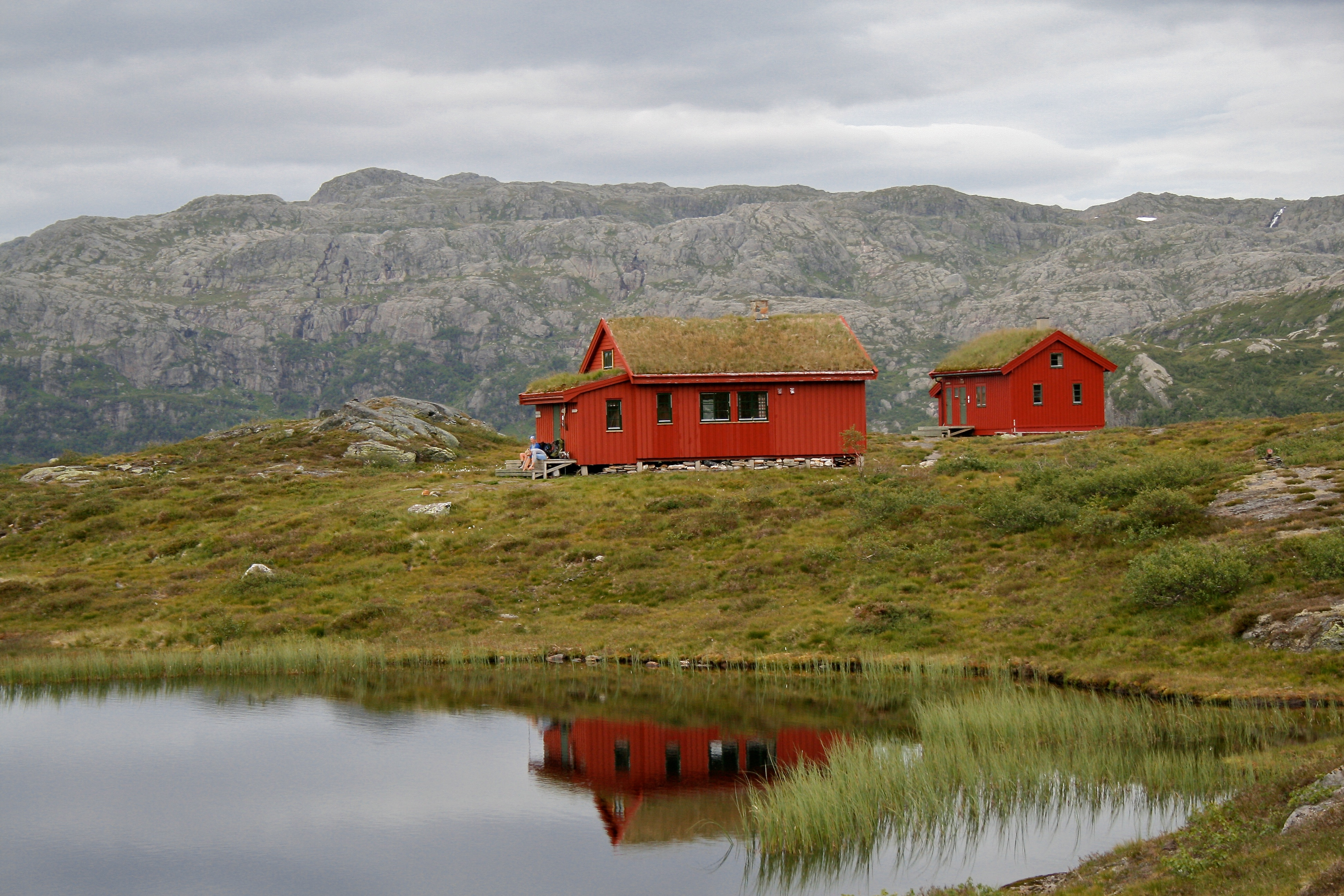
Mountain cabins

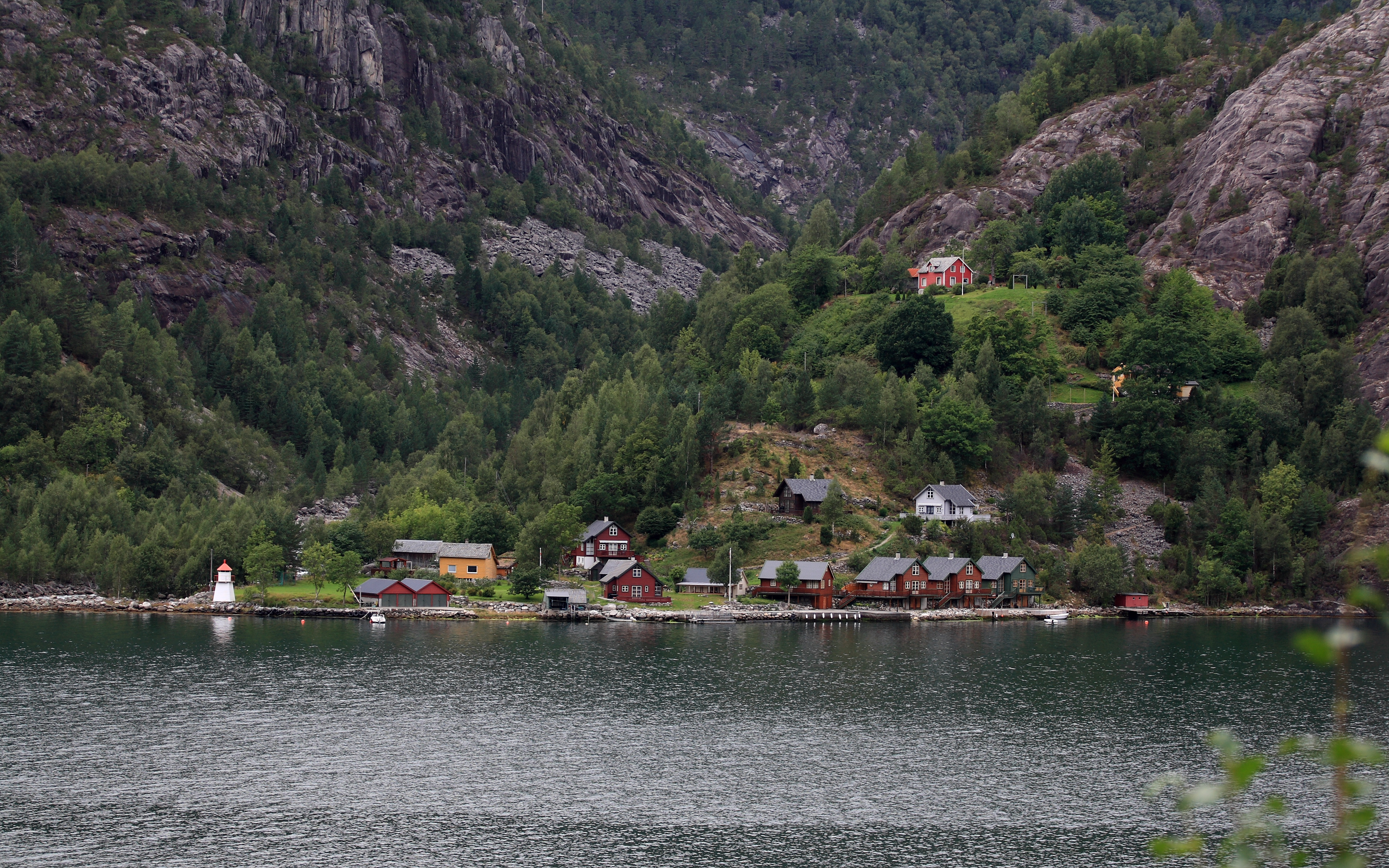
Village of Mosnes

Etne was established as a municipality on 1 January 1838 (see formannskapsdistrikt law). Originally, Etne Municipality encompassed the area around the Etnefjorden and the surrounding valleys. For over 120 years, the borders of the municipality did not change.

During the 1960s, there were many municipal mergers across Norway due to the work of the Schei Committee. On 1 January 1965, the neighboring Skånevik Municipality was dissolved and merged into its neighboring municipalities as follows:

- the part of Skånevik Municipality located south of the Åkrafjorden and east of the village of Åkra on the north side of the fjord (population: 1,493) was merged into Etne Municipality
- the part of Skånevik Municipality lying north of the fjord and west of the village of Åkra (population: 1,189), became a part of Kvinnherad Municipality to the north

Historically, this municipality was part of the old Hordaland county. On 1 January 2020, the municipality became a part of the newly-formed Vestland county (after Hordaland and Sogn og Fjordane counties were merged).

=== Name ===
The municipality (originally the parish) is named after the Etnefjorden (Old Norse: Eðni). The name is likely derived from the old name for the river "Etneelvi", Atn or Etn. The meaning of the old river name may come from etja which means "to drive forward" or "to goad" or it might come from eta which means "to eat".

=== Coat of arms ===
The coat of arms was granted on 16 December 1983. The official blazon is "Per pale dovetailed azure and argent" (Norwegian: Kløyvt av blått og kvitt med duestjertsnitt). This means the arms have are divided with a vertical line that is dovetailed. The field (background) to the left of the line has a tincture of blue. To the right of the line, the field has a tincture of argent which means it is commonly colored white, but if it is made out of metal, then silver is used. The design was chosen to represent the strong unity between the two former municipalities of Skånevik and Etne that were joined to form one municipality in 1965. The arms were designed by Magnus Hardeland and John Digernes. The municipal flag has the same design as the coat of arms.

=== Churches ===
The Church of Norway has two parishes (sokn) within Etne Municipality. It is part of the Sunnhordland prosti (deanery) in the Diocese of Bjørgvin.

Churches in Etne Municipality
| Parish (sokn) | Church name | Location of the church | Year built |
|---|---|---|---|
| Etne | Etne Church | Etnesjøen | 2013 |
| Etne | Gjerde Church | Etnesjøen | 1676 |
| Etne | Grindheim Church | Etnesjøen | 1728 |
| Etne | Stødle Church | Etnesjøen | 1160 |
| Skånevik | Skånevik Church | Skånevik | 1900 |
| Skånevik | Fjæra Chapel | Fjæra | 1913 |

== Geography ==
Etne Municipality is situated south of the city of Bergen and it borders Kvinnherad Municipality and Ullensvang Municipality to the north in Vestland county and Sauda Municipality, Suldal Municipality, and Vindafjord Municipality to the south in Rogaland county.

Etne Municipality has a varied landscape, extending from the Etnefjorden, Skånevikfjorden, and Åkrafjorden at sea level, through the villages up to the high mountains. In the far north, there is a barren and heavily eroded mountain glacier, Folgefonna, where the municipality's highest point rises 1,633 metres (5,358 ft) above sea level. Folgefonna National Park is partially located in Etne. In addition to that national park, Etne has three nature reserves: Brattholmen, Skåno, and Langebudalen. Lakes in the area include Lykilsvatnet. The famous waterfall Langfossen is located in northern Etne.

== Climate ==
Climate data for Etne II (8 m, precipitation 2005-2024, extremes 2016-2024)
| Month | Jan | Feb | Mar | Apr | May | Jun | Jul | Aug | Sep | Oct | Nov | Dec | Year |
|---|---|---|---|---|---|---|---|---|---|---|---|---|---|
| Record high °C (°F) | 12.0 (53.6) | 15.7 (60.3) | 16.2 (61.2) | 23.2 (73.8) | 32.7 (90.9) | 30.2 (86.4) | 34.8 (94.6) | 30.4 (86.7) | 30.6 (87.1) | 21.7 (71.1) | 18.3 (64.9) | 12.8 (55.0) | 34.8 (94.6) |
| Daily mean °C (°F) | 0.8 (33.4) | 0.8 (33.4) | 2.8 (37.0) | 6.4 (43.5) | 10.2 (50.4) | 13.4 (56.1) | 15.3 (59.5) | 15.1 (59.2) | 12.2 (54.0) | 7.7 (45.9) | 3.6 (38.5) | 1.2 (34.2) | 7.5 (45.4) |
| Record low °C (°F) | −16.8 (1.8) | −17.9 (−0.2) | −17.2 (1.0) | −7.3 (18.9) | −2.8 (27.0) | 1.8 (35.2) | 4.1 (39.4) | 2.5 (36.5) | 0.7 (33.3) | −5.8 (21.6) | −12.2 (10.0) | −14.5 (5.9) | −17.9 (−0.2) |
| Average precipitation mm (inches) | 230 (9.1) | 194 (7.6) | 162 (6.4) | 110 (4.3) | 98 (3.9) | 115 (4.5) | 143 (5.6) | 169 (6.7) | 206 (8.1) | 226 (8.9) | 228 (9.0) | 250 (9.8) | 2,131 (83.9) |
Source: yr.no/Norwegian Meteorological Institute

== History ==
Recent archeological findings indicate that the area was already inhabited around 500 BC.

== Population ==
Historical population

| Year | Pop. | ±% p.a. |
|---|---|---|
| 1845 | 2,416 | — |
| 1855 | 2,553 | +0.55% |
| 1865 | 2,610 | +0.22% |
| 1875 | 2,599 | −0.04% |
| 1890 | 2,324 | −0.74% |
| 1900 | 2,113 | −0.95% |
| 1910 | 2,078 | −0.17% |

| Year | Pop. | ±% p.a. |
|---|---|---|
| 1920 | 2,118 | +0.19% |
| 1930 | 2,035 | −0.40% |
| 1946 | 2,416 | +1.08% |
| 1951 | 2,452 | +0.30% |
| 1960 | 2,512 | +0.27% |
| 1970 | 3,930 | +4.58% |
| 1980 | 3,980 | +0.13% |

| Year | Pop. | ±% p.a. |
|---|---|---|
| 1990 | 4,037 | +0.14% |
| 2000 | 3,917 | −0.30% |
| 2010 | 3,882 | −0.09% |
| 2020 | 4,062 | +0.45% |
| 2023 | 4,073 | +0.09% |

Note: The municipal borders were changed in 1965, causing a significant change in the population.
Source: Statistics Norway and Norwegian Historical Data Centre

== Government ==
Etne Municipality is responsible for primary education (through 10th grade), outpatient health services, senior citizen services, welfare and other social services, zoning, economic development, and municipal roads and utilities. The municipality is governed by a municipal council of directly elected representatives. The mayor is indirectly elected by a vote of the municipal council. The municipality is under the jurisdiction of the Haugaland og Sunnhordland District Court and the Gulating Court of Appeal.

=== Municipal council ===
The municipal council (Kommunestyre) of Etne Municipality is made up of 17 representatives that are elected to four-year terms. The tables below show the current and historical composition of the council by political party.

Etne kommunestyre 2023–2027
| Party name (in Nynorsk) | Number of representatives |
|---|---|
| Labour Party (Arbeidarpartiet) | 3 |
| Progress Party (Framstegspartiet) | 4 |
| Conservative Party (Høgre) | 2 |
| Industry and Business Party (Industri‑ og Næringspartiet) | 1 |
| Christian Democratic Party (Kristeleg Folkeparti) | 2 |
| Centre Party (Senterpartiet) | 4 |
| Liberal Party (Venstre) | 1 |
| Total number of members: | 17 |

Etne kommunestyre 2019–2023
| Party name (in Nynorsk) | Number of representatives |
|---|---|
| Labour Party (Arbeidarpartiet) | 2 |
| Progress Party (Framstegspartiet) | 4 |
| Conservative Party (Høgre) | 1 |
| Christian Democratic Party (Kristeleg Folkeparti) | 2 |
| Centre Party (Senterpartiet) | 7 |
| Liberal Party (Venstre) | 1 |
| Total number of members: | 17 |

Etne kommunestyre 2015–2019
| Party name (in Nynorsk) | Number of representatives |
|---|---|
| Labour Party (Arbeidarpartiet) | 5 |
| Progress Party (Framstegspartiet) | 4 |
| Conservative Party (Høgre) | 3 |
| Christian Democratic Party (Kristeleg Folkeparti) | 2 |
| Centre Party (Senterpartiet) | 6 |
| Liberal Party (Venstre) | 1 |
| Total number of members: | 21 |

Etne kommunestyre 2011–2015
| Party name (in Nynorsk) | Number of representatives |
|---|---|
| Labour Party (Arbeidarpartiet) | 6 |
| Progress Party (Framstegspartiet) | 3 |
| Conservative Party (Høgre) | 3 |
| Christian Democratic Party (Kristeleg Folkeparti) | 2 |
| Centre Party (Senterpartiet) | 6 |
| Liberal Party (Venstre) | 1 |
| Total number of members: | 21 |

Etne kommunestyre 2007–2011
| Party name (in Nynorsk) | Number of representatives |
|---|---|
| Labour Party (Arbeidarpartiet) | 6 |
| Progress Party (Framstegspartiet) | 3 |
| Conservative Party (Høgre) | 3 |
| Christian Democratic Party (Kristeleg Folkeparti) | 2 |
| Centre Party (Senterpartiet) | 6 |
| Liberal Party (Venstre) | 1 |
| Total number of members: | 21 |

Etne kommunestyre 2003–2007
| Party name (in Nynorsk) | Number of representatives |
|---|---|
| Labour Party (Arbeidarpartiet) | 4 |
| Progress Party (Framstegspartiet) | 3 |
| Conservative Party (Høgre) | 6 |
| Christian Democratic Party (Kristeleg Folkeparti) | 3 |
| Centre Party (Senterpartiet) | 3 |
| Liberal Party (Venstre) | 1 |
| Local list (Krinslista) | 1 |
| Total number of members: | 21 |

Etne kommunestyre 1999–2003
| Party name (in Nynorsk) | Number of representatives |
|---|---|
| Labour Party (Arbeidarpartiet) | 4 |
| Progress Party (Framstegspartiet) | 2 |
| Conservative Party (Høgre) | 5 |
| Christian Democratic Party (Kristeleg Folkeparti) | 4 |
| Centre Party (Senterpartiet) | 3 |
| Liberal Party (Venstre) | 1 |
| Local list (Krinslista) | 2 |
| Total number of members: | 21 |

Etne kommunestyre 1995–1999
| Party name (in Nynorsk) | Number of representatives |
|---|---|
| Labour Party (Arbeidarpartiet) | 5 |
| Conservative Party (Høgre) | 5 |
| Christian Democratic Party (Kristeleg Folkeparti) | 4 |
| Centre Party (Senterpartiet) | 7 |
| Liberal Party (Venstre) | 3 |
| Etne local list (Etne bygdeliste) | 2 |
| Local list for Skånevik (Krinsliste for Skånevik) | 3 |
| Total number of members: | 29 |

Etne kommunestyre 1991–1995
| Party name (in Nynorsk) | Number of representatives |
|---|---|
| Labour Party (Arbeidarpartiet) | 6 |
| Conservative Party (Høgre) | 4 |
| Christian Democratic Party (Kristeleg Folkeparti) | 5 |
| Centre Party (Senterpartiet) | 9 |
| Liberal Party (Venstre) | 1 |
| Etne local list (Etne bygdeliste) | 1 |
| Local list for Skånevik (Krinsliste for Skånevik) | 3 |
| Total number of members: | 29 |

Etne kommunestyre 1987–1991
| Party name (in Nynorsk) | Number of representatives |
|---|---|
| Labour Party (Arbeidarpartiet) | 7 |
| Progress Party (Framstegspartiet) | 1 |
| Conservative Party (Høgre) | 6 |
| Christian Democratic Party (Kristeleg Folkeparti) | 5 |
| Centre Party (Senterpartiet) | 5 |
| Liberal Party (Venstre) | 1 |
| Etne local list (Etne bygdeliste) | 2 |
| Local list for Skånevik (Krinsliste for Skånevik) | 2 |
| Total number of members: | 29 |

Etne kommunestyre 1983–1987
| Party name (in Nynorsk) | Number of representatives |
|---|---|
| Labour Party (Arbeidarpartiet) | 7 |
| Progress Party (Framstegspartiet) | 1 |
| Conservative Party (Høgre) | 5 |
| Christian Democratic Party (Kristeleg Folkeparti) | 5 |
| Centre Party (Senterpartiet) | 4 |
| Liberal Party (Venstre) | 1 |
| Non-party list (Upolitisk liste) | 2 |
| Local list for Skånevik (Krinsliste for Skånevik) | 4 |
| Total number of members: | 29 |

Etne kommunestyre 1979–1983
| Party name (in Nynorsk) | Number of representatives |
|---|---|
| Labour Party (Arbeidarpartiet) | 6 |
| Conservative Party (Høgre) | 5 |
| Christian Democratic Party (Kristeleg Folkeparti) | 7 |
| Centre Party (Senterpartiet) | 5 |
| Liberal Party (Venstre) | 1 |
| Non-party list (Upolitisk liste) | 1 |
| Local list for Skånevik (Krinsliste for Skånevik) | 4 |
| Total number of members: | 29 |

Etne kommunestyre 1975–1979
| Party name (in Nynorsk) | Number of representatives |
|---|---|
| Labour Party (Arbeidarpartiet) | 7 |
| Conservative Party (Høgre) | 4 |
| Christian Democratic Party (Kristeleg Folkeparti) | 7 |
| New People's Party (Nye Folkepartiet) | 1 |
| Centre Party (Senterpartiet) | 7 |
| Liberal Party (Venstre) | 1 |
| Local list for Skånevik (Krinsliste for Skånevik) | 2 |
| Total number of members: | 29 |

Etne kommunestyre 1971–1975
| Party name (in Nynorsk) | Number of representatives |
|---|---|
| Labour Party (Arbeidarpartiet) | 8 |
| Conservative Party (Høgre) | 4 |
| Christian Democratic Party (Kristeleg Folkeparti) | 6 |
| Centre Party (Senterpartiet) | 7 |
| Liberal Party (Venstre) | 4 |
| Total number of members: | 29 |

Etne kommunestyre 1967–1971
| Party name (in Nynorsk) | Number of representatives |
|---|---|
| Labour Party (Arbeidarpartiet) | 9 |
| Conservative Party (Høgre) | 4 |
| Christian Democratic Party (Kristeleg Folkeparti) | 6 |
| Centre Party (Senterpartiet) | 6 |
| Liberal Party (Venstre) | 4 |
| Total number of members: | 29 |

Etne kommunestyre 1963–1967
| Party name (in Nynorsk) | Number of representatives |
|---|---|
| Labour Party (Arbeidarpartiet) | 7 |
| Conservative Party (Høgre) | 3 |
| Christian Democratic Party (Kristeleg Folkeparti) | 3 |
| Centre Party (Senterpartiet) | 5 |
| Liberal Party (Venstre) | 3 |
| Total number of members: | 21 |
Note: On 1 January 1965, Skånevik Municipality became part of Etne Municipality.

Etne heradsstyre 1959–1963
| Party name (in Nynorsk) | Number of representatives |
|---|---|
| Labour Party (Arbeidarpartiet) | 7 |
| Conservative Party (Høgre) | 2 |
| Christian Democratic Party (Kristeleg Folkeparti) | 3 |
| Centre Party (Senterpartiet) | 5 |
| Liberal Party (Venstre) | 4 |
| Total number of members: | 21 |

Etne heradsstyre 1955–1959
| Party name (in Nynorsk) | Number of representatives |
|---|---|
| Labour Party (Arbeidarpartiet) | 6 |
| Conservative Party (Høgre) | 2 |
| Farmers' Party (Bondepartiet) | 7 |
| Joint List(s) of Non-Socialist Parties (Borgarlege Felleslister) | 6 |
| Total number of members: | 21 |

Etne heradsstyre 1951–1955
| Party name (in Nynorsk) | Number of representatives |
|---|---|
| Labour Party (Arbeidarpartiet) | 7 |
| Joint List(s) of Non-Socialist Parties (Borgarlege Felleslister) | 11 |
| Local List(s) (Lokale lister) | 6 |
| Total number of members: | 24 |

Etne heradsstyre 1947–1951
| Party name (in Nynorsk) | Number of representatives |
|---|---|
| Labour Party (Arbeidarpartiet) | 7 |
| Joint List(s) of Non-Socialist Parties (Borgarlege Felleslister) | 14 |
| Local List(s) (Lokale lister) | 3 |
| Total number of members: | 24 |

Etne heradsstyre 1945–1947
| Party name (in Nynorsk) | Number of representatives |
|---|---|
| Labour Party (Arbeidarpartiet) | 7 |
| Joint List(s) of Non-Socialist Parties (Borgarlege Felleslister) | 3 |
| Local List(s) (Lokale lister) | 14 |
| Total number of members: | 24 |

Etne heradsstyre 1937–1941*
| Party name (in Nynorsk) | Number of representatives |
|---|---|
| Labour Party (Arbeidarpartiet) | 6 |
| Farmers' Party (Bondepartiet) | 11 |
| Joint List(s) of Non-Socialist Parties (Borgarlege Felleslister) | 2 |
| Local List(s) (Lokale lister) | 5 |
| Total number of members: | 24 |
Note: Due to the German occupation of Norway during World War II, no elections were held for new municipal councils until after the war ended in 1945.

=== Mayors ===
The mayor (Nynorsk: ordførar) of Etne Municipality is the political leader of the municipality and the chairperson of the municipal council. The following people have held this position:

- 1838–1839: Rev. Nicolai Friis Aabel
- 1840–1843: Ludvig Munthe Weltzin
- 1844–1847: Johan Ludvig Weltzin
- 1848–1851: Rev. Peder Mandrup Tuxen Abel
- 1852–1855: Baard L. Flaaden
- 1856–1858: Johan K. Dahl
- 1859–1859: Lars B. Hardeland
- 1860–1863: Amund Moe
- 1864–1867: Wilhelm Weltzin
- 1868–1871: Halvor Fosse
- 1872–1875: Alexander Søholt
- 1876–1877: Elias Larsen
- 1878–1879: Alexander Søholt
- 1880–1883: Halvor Fosse
- 1884–1895: Thorbjørn Øien
- 1896–1898: Halvor Fosse
- 1899–1901: Mr. Hammersland
- 1902–1910: Edvard Børretzen
- 1911–1913: H. Grindheim
- 1914–1916: Ola Vinje
- 1917–1922: Øystein A. Grønstad
- 1923–1925: Torkel H. Hamre
- 1926–1931: Øystein A. Grønstad
- 1932–1934: Torbjørn O. Hardeland
- 1934–1941: Øystein Grønstad
- 1941–1941: Edvard Hjelmeland
- 1945–1952: Trygve Vinje (V)
- 1952–1959: Sjur Moe (Bp)
- 1959–1964: Anders Grønstad (Sp)
- 1965–1966: Trygve Vinje (V)
- 1967–1975: Ingvald Gravelsæter (Sp)
- 1975–1983: Olav Fjæra (KrF)
- 1983–1987: Einride Aakra (Sp)
- 1987–1991: Lars J. Øyre (H)
- 1991–1995: Erling Steine (Sp)
- 1995–1999: Lars Lundal (H)
- 1999–2007: Amund Enge (H)
- 2007–2015: Sigve Sørheim (Sp)
- 2015–2019: Siri Klokkerstuen (Ap)
- 2019–present: Mette Heidi Bergsvåg Ekrheim (Sp)

== Transportation ==
The European route E134 highway runs the length of the municipality connecting it to the city of Haugesund in the southwest and to Oslo in the east. The highway runs through Etnesjøen and then northeastwards along the Åkrafjorden before crossing into the neighboring Ullensvang Municipality. There are many tunnels along the route, some quite long, including the Åkrafjord Tunnel, Fjæra Tunnel, Markhus Tunnel, and Rullestad Tunnel.

The Eintveitbrua is a bridge in rural Etne that is not connected to the road network. It is considered to be a bridge to nowhere.

== Notable people ==
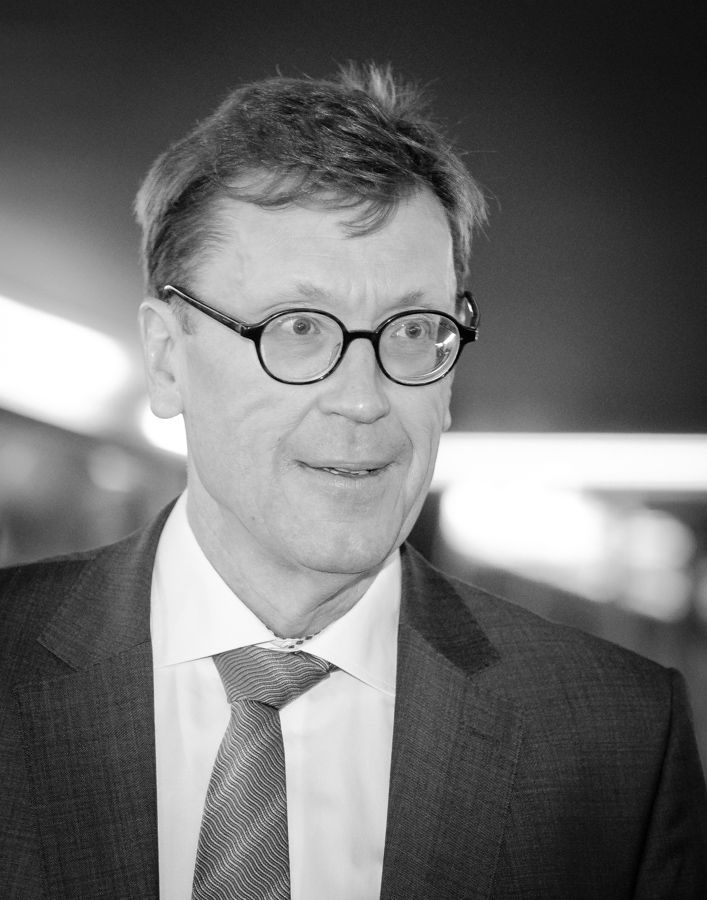
Osmund Kaldheim, 2018

- Erling Skakke (1115 at Etne – 1179), a Norwegian Jarl (Earl) during the 12th century
- Magnus V of Norway (1156 at Etne – 1184), the King during the Civil war era in Norway
- Jacob Børretzen (1900 in Etne – 1989), a hymnwriter and linguist
- Ingvar Moe (1936 in Etne - 1993), a poet, novelist, and children's writer
- Hans Olav Tungesvik (1936 in Skånevik – 2017), a physician and politician
- Osmund Kaldheim (born 1964), a businessman, civil servant, and politician who grew up in Etne
- Ivar Bjørnson (born 1977 in Etne), a composer and guitarist for the progressive black metal band Enslaved
- Anne Lise Frøkedal (born 1981 in Etne), a folk-pop singer-songwriter known by her stage name Frøkedal
