= Etne (ship) =

Ships with the name Etne include:

- MS Etne (1962) Norway (Known as MS Etne 1962–1983, now Gem Star)
- MF Askøy (1979) Norway (Known as MF Etne 1988–)
