= Åkra, Vestland =

Village in Kvinnherad Municipality, Norway

Åkra
- Village
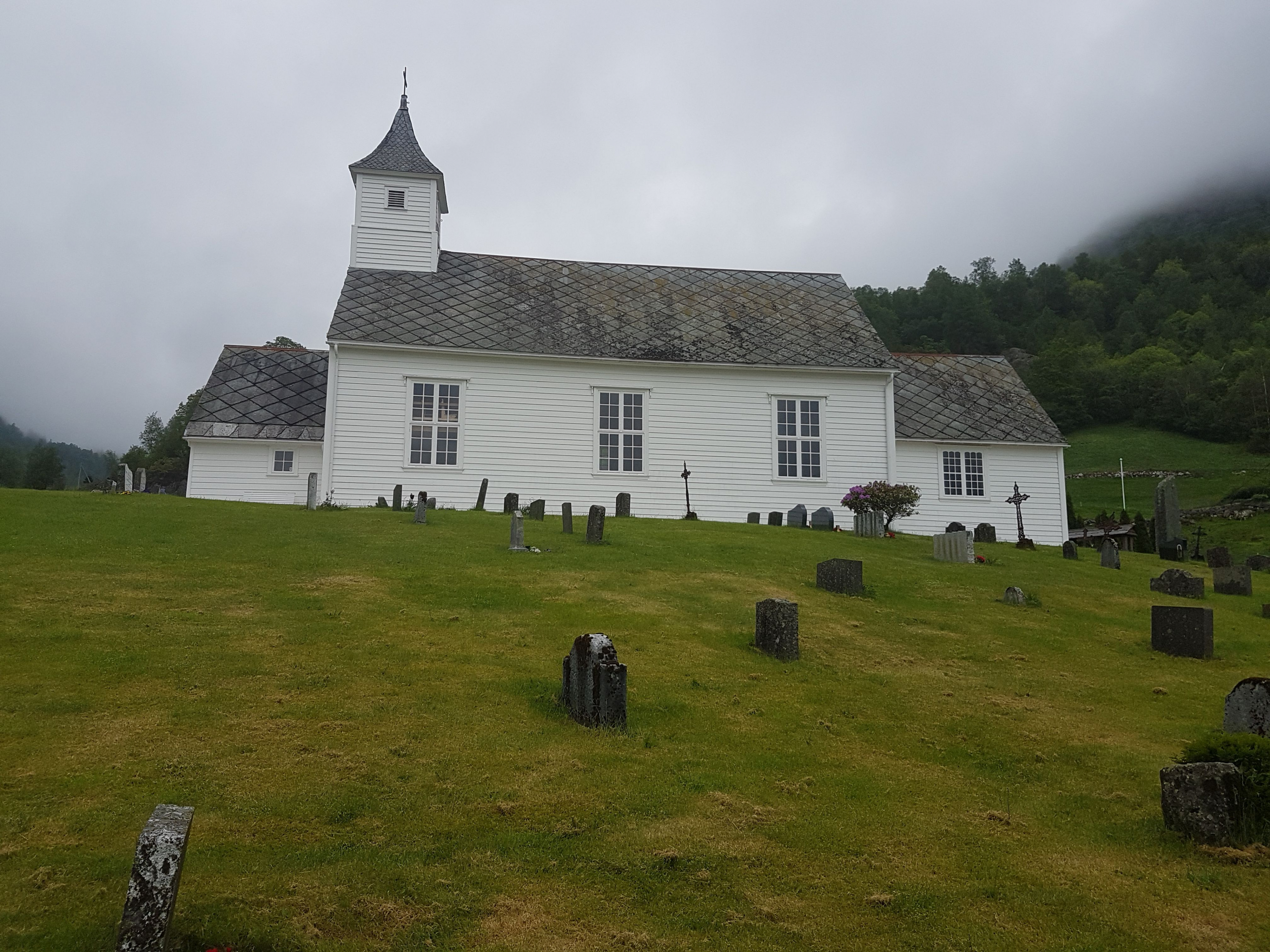
- View of the village church
- Interactive map of Åkra
- Coordinates: 59.79152°N 6.09837°E
- Country: Norway
- Region: Western Norway
- County: Vestland
- District: Sunnhordland
- Municipality: Kvinnherad Municipality
- Elevation: 26 m (85 ft)
- Time zone: UTC+01:00 (CET)
  - Summer (DST): UTC+02:00 (CEST)
- Post Code: 5499 Åkra

Åkra is a village in Kvinnherad Municipality in Vestland county, Norway. The village is located on the north side of the Åkrafjorden, about 12 kilometres (7.5 mi) northeast of the village of Skånevik.

The village sits in the far southeastern corner of the municipality. It sits at the end of Norwegian County Road 5024, a road running from Dimmelsvik to Åkra where it ends. The village area is fairly isolated, with only one road in and out, sitting in a small valley with mountains and a fjord surrounding it. Åkra Church is located in the village.
