= Skånevik (village) =

Village in Etne Municipality, Norway

- Village
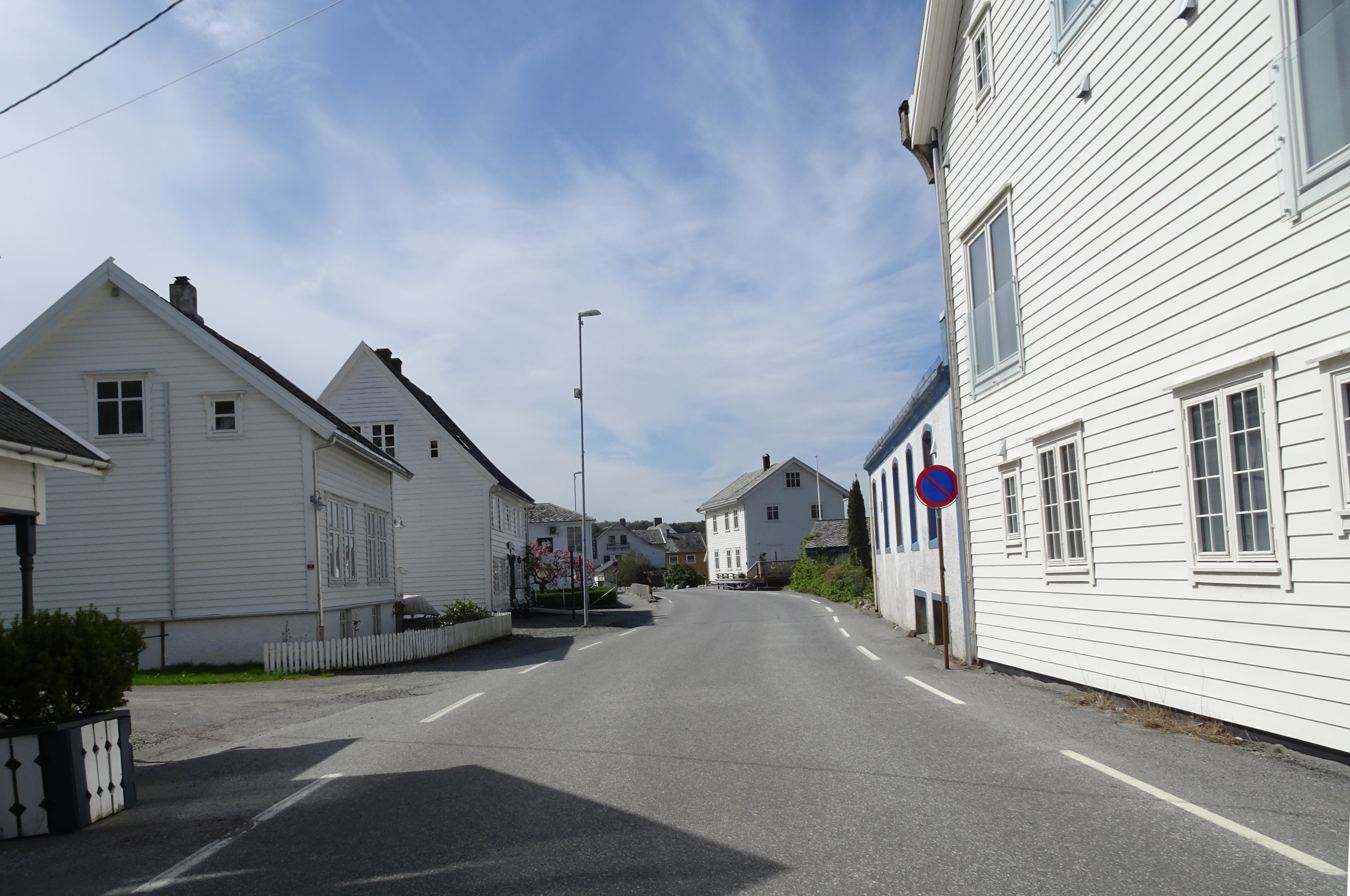
- View of the village
- Interactive map of Skånevik
- Coordinates: 59.73288°N 5.93762°E
- Country: Norway
- Region: Western Norway
- County: Vestland
- District: Sunnhordland
- Municipality: Etne Municipality

Area
  - Total: 0.95 km^{2} (0.37 sq mi)
- Elevation: 4 m (13 ft)

Population (2025)
  - Total: 562
  - Density: 592/km^{2} (1,530/sq mi)
- Time zone: UTC+01:00 (CET)
  - Summer (DST): UTC+02:00 (CEST)
- Post Code: 5593 Skånevik

Skånevik is a village in Etne Municipality in Vestland county, Norway. The village is located along the Skånevikfjorden, near the entrance to the Åkrafjorden. The village lies across the fjord from the village of Utåker in neighboring Kvinnherad Municipality. The municipal centre of Etnesjøen lies about 8 kilometres (5.0 mi) straight south across a mountain, although one must drive about 22 kilometres (14 mi) around the mountain to get there.

The 0.95-square-kilometre (230-acre) village has a population (2025) of 562 and a population density of 592 inhabitants per square kilometre (1,530/sq mi).

== Transportation ==
The village is a transportation hub for the area since it is a regular port of call for a cross-fjord ferry route. The ferry goes from Skånevik to Utåker to Sunde i Matre. There are also ferries that go from Skånevik to Bergen. The European route E134 highway can be accessed just 10 kilometres (6.2 mi) east of Skånevik.

== History ==
The village was the administrative centre of the old Skånevik Municipality which existed until 1965. Skånevik Church was the main church for the old municipality, and it is still in use in the village today.
