= Utåker =

Village in Kvinnherad Municipality, Norway

- Village
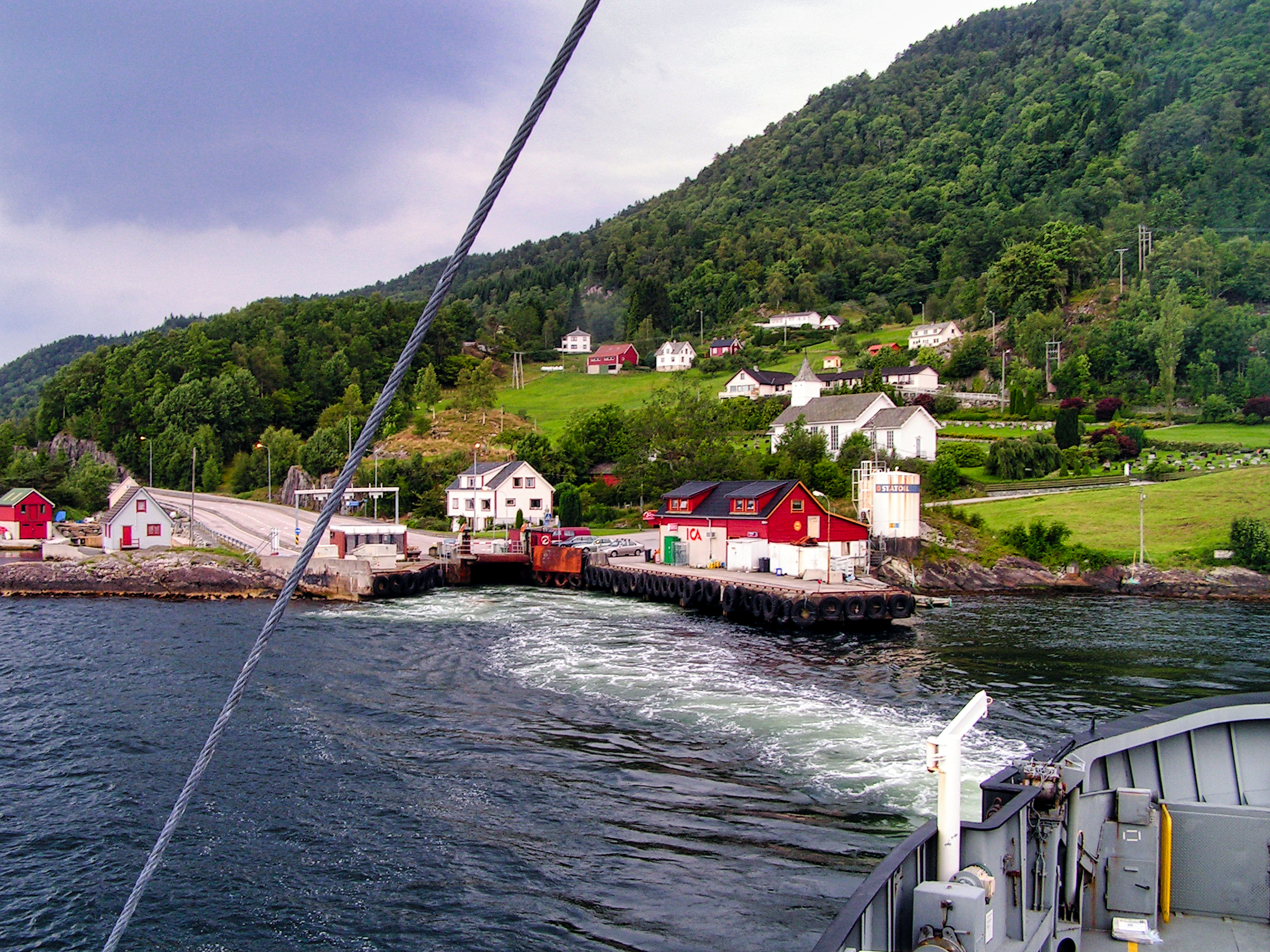
- View of the village
- Interactive map of Utåker
- Coordinates: 59.78506°N 5.90342°E
- Country: Norway
- Region: Western Norway
- County: Vestland
- District: Sunnhordland
- Municipality: Kvinnherad Municipality
- Elevation: 17 m (56 ft)
- Time zone: UTC+01:00 (CET)
  - Summer (DST): UTC+02:00 (CEST)
- Post Code: 5453 Utåker

Utåker is a village in Kvinnherad Municipality in Vestland county, Norway. The village is located where the Skåneviksfjorden splits into the Matersfjorden and Åkrafjorden.

The village of Skånevik lies to the south, across the fjord. The village has a ferry quay with regular routes from Skånevik to Sunde i Matre to Utåker. Holmedal Church is located in this village.
