= Etnefjorden =

Fjord in Sunnhordland, Norway

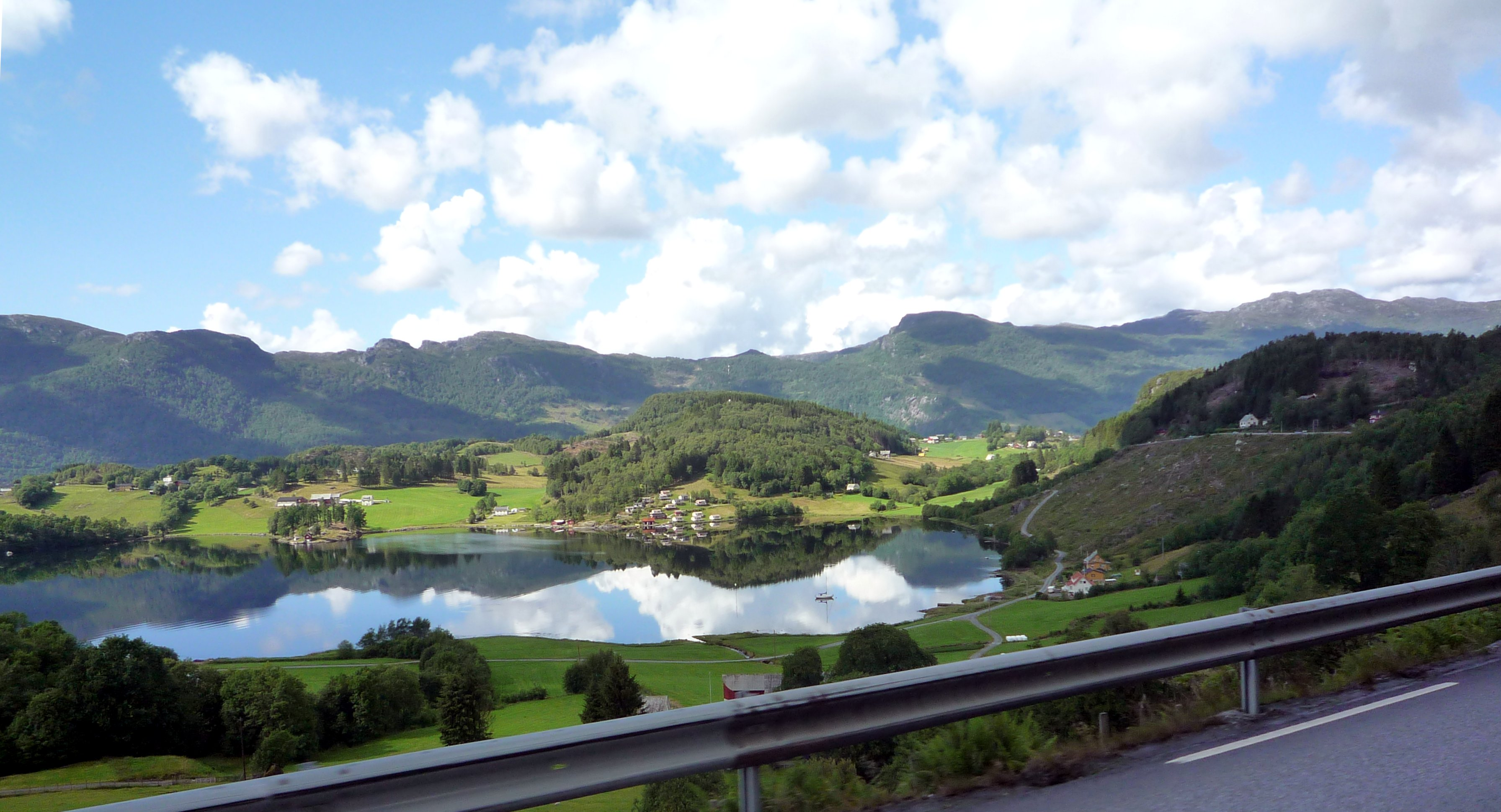
- View of the fjord
- Interactive map of the fjord
- Location: Vestland county, Norway
- Coordinates: 59.65183°N 5.8577°E
- Type: Fjord
- Primary outflows: Hardangerfjorden
- Basin countries: Norway
- Max. length: 8 kilometres (5.0 mi)
- Max. width: 3 kilometres (1.9 mi)
- Settlements: Etnesjøen

Etnefjorden is a fjord on the border between Vestland and Rogaland counties in Norway. The majority of the fjord lies in Etne Municipality (in Vestland county), but a small part of it also lies in the neighboring Vindafjord Municipality (in Rogaland county). The 8.5-kilometre (5.3 mi) long fjord flows from the village of Etnesjøen to the west into the Skånevikfjorden/Hardangerfjorden. The fjord is fed by the Etneelva river which empties into the fjord at the village of Etnesjøen. The European route E134 highway runs along the inner part of the fjord.

== See also ==
- List of Norwegian fjords
