= Skånevik Church =

Church in Vestland, Norway

- Skånevik kyrkje
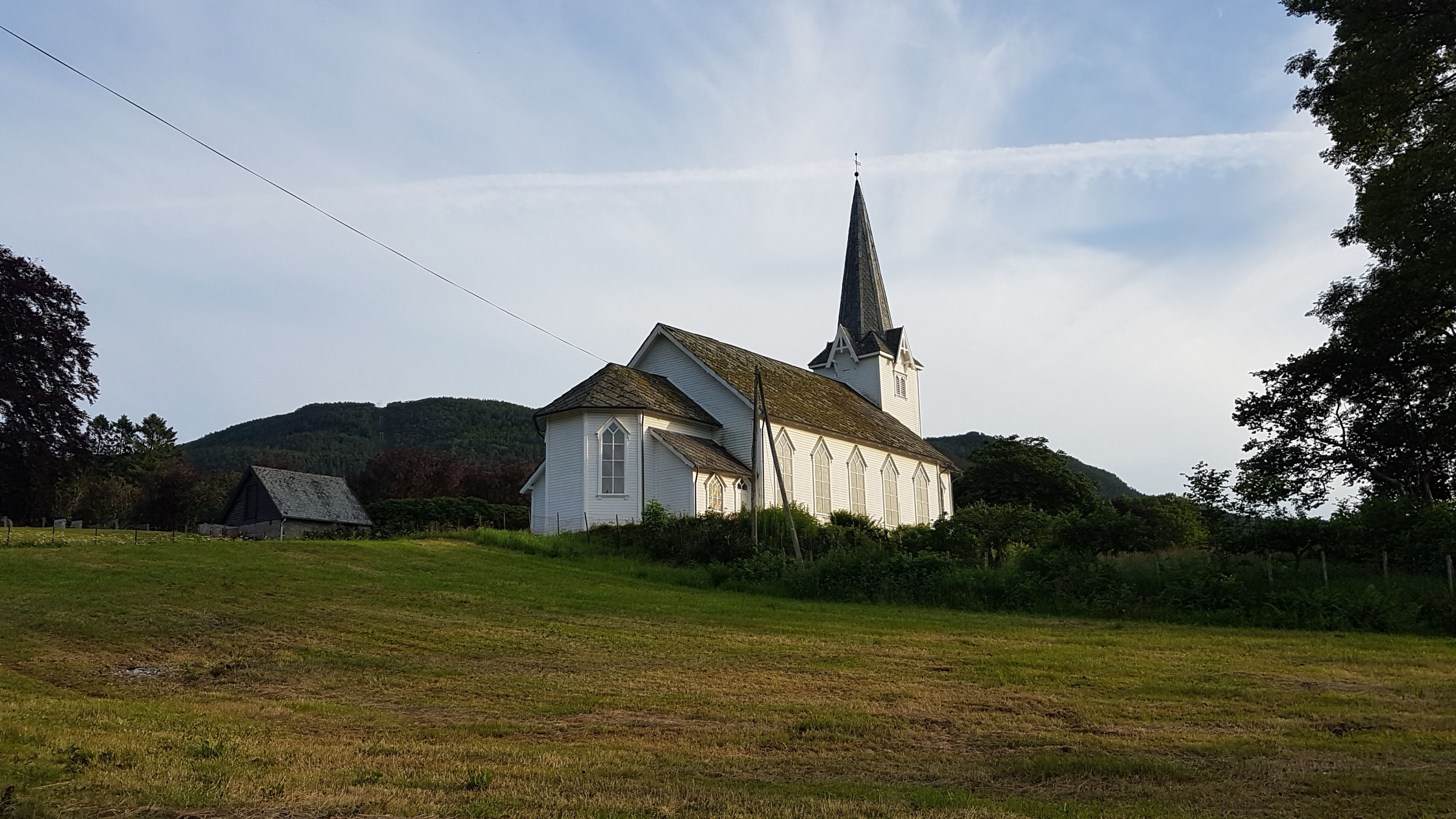
- View of the church
- Skånevik Church
- 59°43′55″N 5°56′22″E
- Location: Etne Municipality, Vestland
- Country: Norway
- Denomination: Church of Norway
- Previous denomination: Catholic Church
- Churchmanship: Evangelical Lutheran

History
- Status: Parish church
- Founded: 13th century
- Consecrated: 31 August 1900

Architecture
- Functional status: Active
- Architect: H.S. Eckhoff
- Architectural type: Long church
- Completed: 1900 (126 years ago)

Specifications
- Capacity: 400
- Materials: Wood

Administration
- Diocese: Bjørgvin bispedømme
- Deanery: Sunnhordland prosti
- Parish: Skånevik
- Norwegian Cultural Heritage Site
- Type: Church
- Status: Listed
- ID: 85489

Skånevik Church (Norwegian: Skånevik kyrkje) is a parish church of the Church of Norway in Etne Municipality in Vestland county, Norway. It is located in the village of Skånevik. It is one of the churches for the Skånevik parish which is part of the Sunnhordland prosti (deanery) in the Diocese of Bjørgvin. The white, wooden church was built in a long church design in 1900 using plans drawn up by the architect Hartvig Sverdrup Eckhoff. The church seats about 400 people.

== History ==
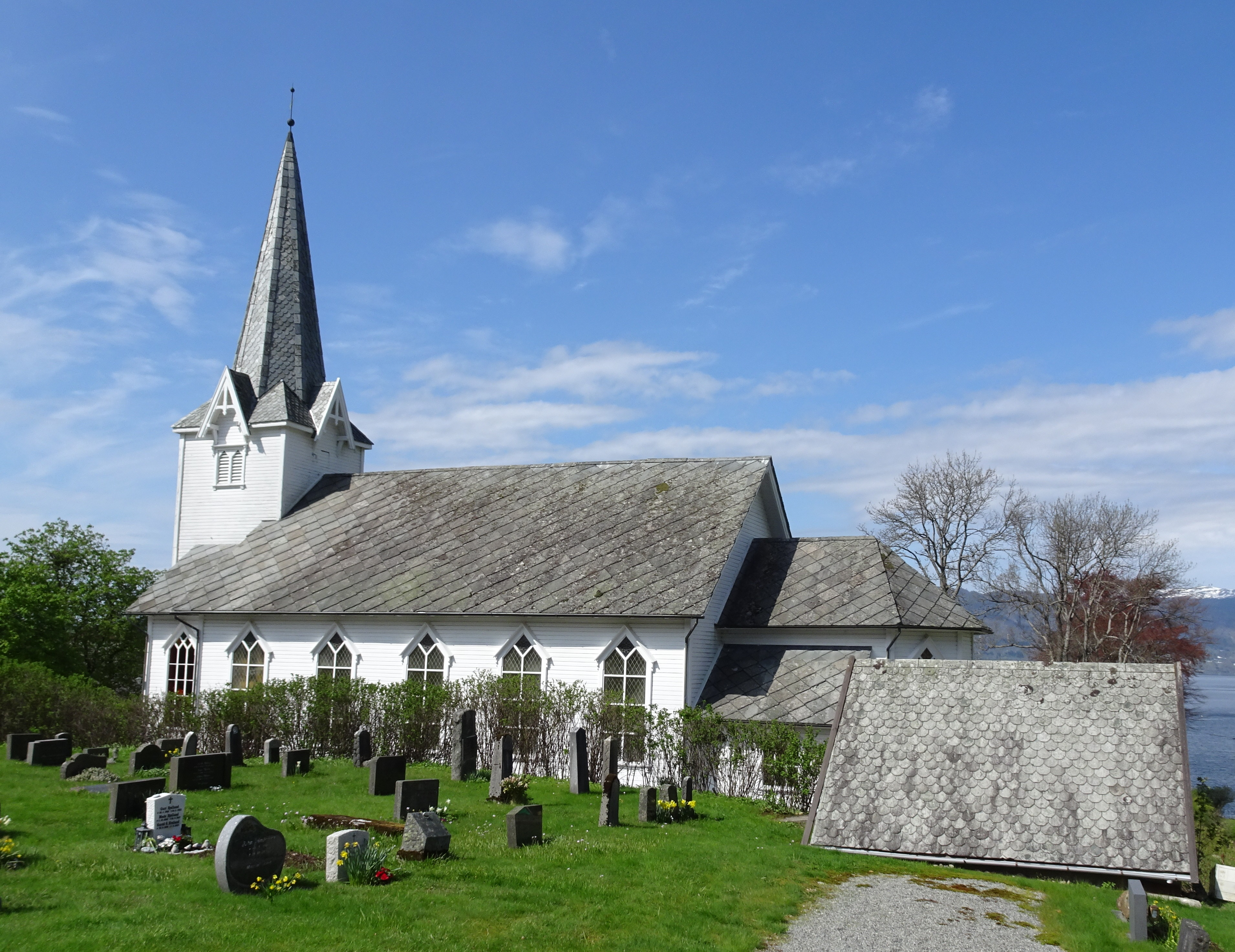
View of the church

The earliest existing historical records of the church date back to the year 1340, but the church was not new at that time. The first church in Skånevik was a wooden stave church that was likely built in the 13th century on a site about 10 metres (33 ft) south of the present church site. An inspection report from 1664 states that the old church was very dilapidated and in poor condition. Throughout the 1660s, the roof was repaired a little by little each year to help save the church, but planning soon began for a new church. In 1674, the church was damaged by a large storm. In 1682–1683, the old church was torn down and replaced by a new timber-framed long church on the same site. The new church was built by Olle Bysemb and Erich Fyllingsnes. The new church had a nave that measured about 12.5 by 10 metres (41 ft × 33 ft) and a choir that measured about 6.3 by 4.4 metres (21 ft × 14 ft).

In 1814, this church served as an election church (Norwegian: valgkirke). Together with more than 300 other parish churches across Norway, it was a polling station for elections to the 1814 Norwegian Constituent Assembly which wrote the Constitution of Norway. This was Norway's first national elections. Each church parish was a constituency that elected people called "electors" who later met together in each county to elect the representatives for the assembly that was to meet at Eidsvoll Manor later that year.

The building was remodeled in 1857. In 1900, a new church was built about 10 metres (33 ft) north of the old church. The new church was designed by Hartvig Sverdrup Eckhoff. The new church was consecrated on 31 August 1900. A few months after the new church was completed, the older church was demolished.

== See also ==
- List of churches in Bjørgvin
