= Etnesjøen =

Village in Etne Municipality, Norway

Etnesjøen Etne
- Village
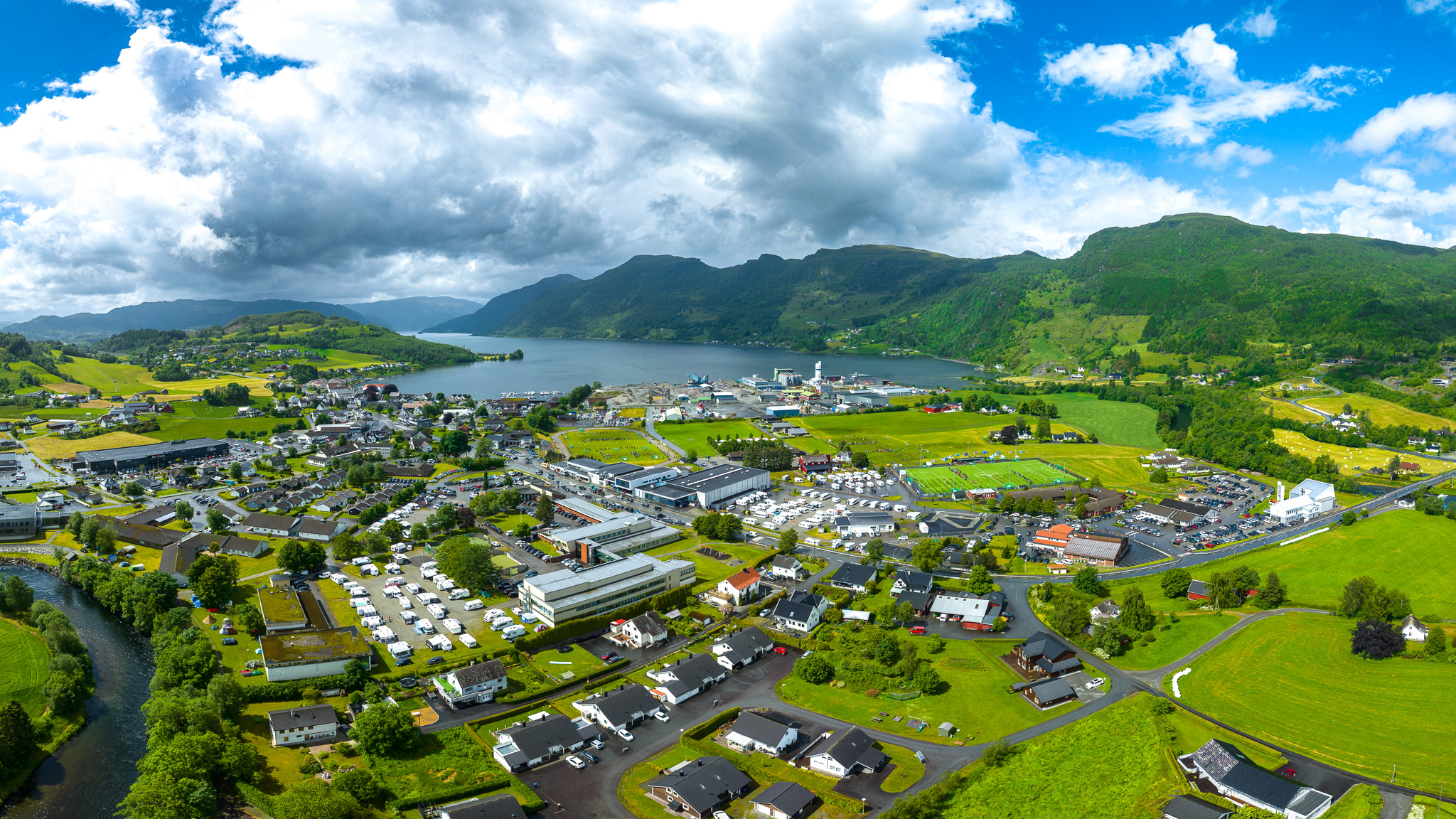
- Panorama of village Etne
- Interactive map of Etnesjøen
- Coordinates: 59.66528°N 5.93708°E
- Country: Norway
- Region: Western Norway
- County: Vestland
- District: Sunnhordland
- Municipality: Etne Municipality

Area
  - Total: 1.39 km^{2} (0.54 sq mi)
- Elevation: 7 m (23 ft)

Population (2025)
  - Total: 1,338
  - Density: 963/km^{2} (2,490/sq mi)
- Time zone: UTC+01:00 (CET)
  - Summer (DST): UTC+02:00 (CEST)
- Post Code: 5590 Etne

Etnesjøen or Etne is the administrative centre of Etne Municipality in Vestland county, Norway. The village is located at the inner end of the Etnefjorden, along the European route E134 highway, about 8 kilometres (5.0 mi) south of the village of Skånevik and about 10 kilometres (6.2 mi) northeast of the village of Ølensjøen (in neighboring Vindafjord Municipality).

The village is located along the river Etneelva in a large river valley surrounded by mountains and a fjord. The lake Løkjelsvatnet lies about 10 kilometres (6.2 mi) west of the centre of the village of Etnesjøen. There are three historic churches and one new church in the greater Etnesjøen area: Etne Church, Gjerde Church, Grindheim Church, and Stødle Church.

The 1.39-square-kilometre (340-acre) village has a population (2025) of 1,338 and a population density of 963 inhabitants per square kilometre (2,490/sq mi).
