= Skånevikfjorden =

Fjord in Norway

- Skåneviksfjorden
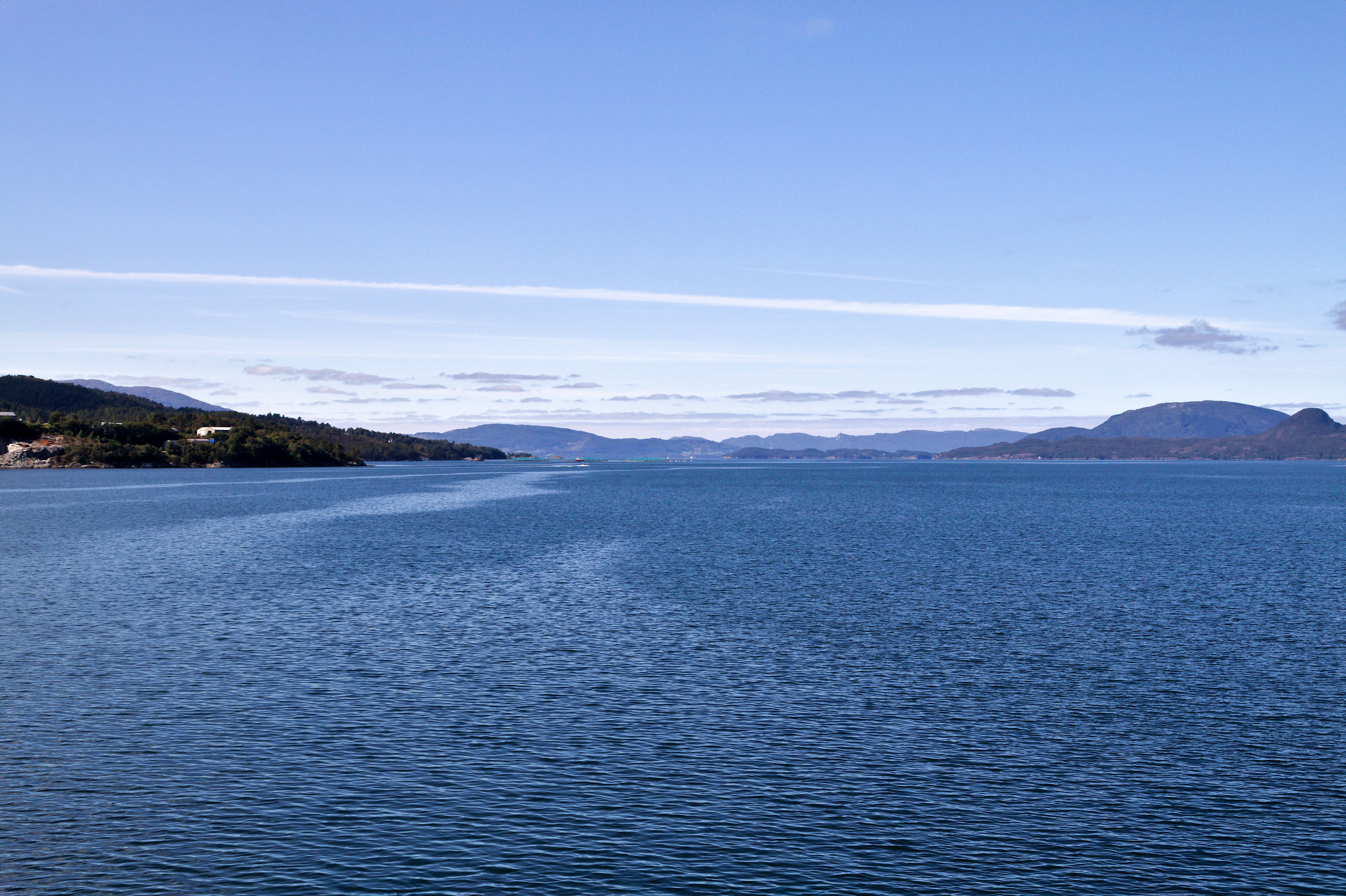
- Looking south-west along the Skånevikfjorden, on the right side the island of Halsnøy
- Interactive map of the fjord
- Location: Sunnhordland, Norway
- Coordinates: 59.72808°N 5.82219°E
- Type: Fjord
- Primary inflows: Åkrafjorden, Etnefjorden, Matersfjorden
- Primary outflows: Hardangerfjorden
- Basin countries: Norway
- Max. length: 15 kilometres (9.3 mi)

Skånevikfjorden is a fjord in Norway. The 15-kilometre (9.3 mi) long fjord runs through Etne Municipality and Kvinnherad Municipality (in Vestland county) and in Vindafjord Municipality (in Rogaland county). The fjord is fed by several smaller fjords such as the Åkrafjorden, Etnefjorden, and Matersfjorden and it flows to the southwest into the main Hardangerfjorden. Some villages along the fjord include Utåker and Skånevik. The islands of Halsnøya, Fjelbergøya, and Borgundøya lie on the northwestern side of the fjord.

On 7 February 1978 a record-breaking dive occurred in the Skånevikfjorden which the divers reaching 320 metres (1,050 ft) deep in the fjord. One of the divers died during a break from welding metal pipes; the government had given the dive a dispensation from part of the regulations for occupational safety.

== See also ==
- List of Norwegian fjords
