= Fjæra =

Village in Vestland, Norway

Fjæra Åkrabotn
- Village
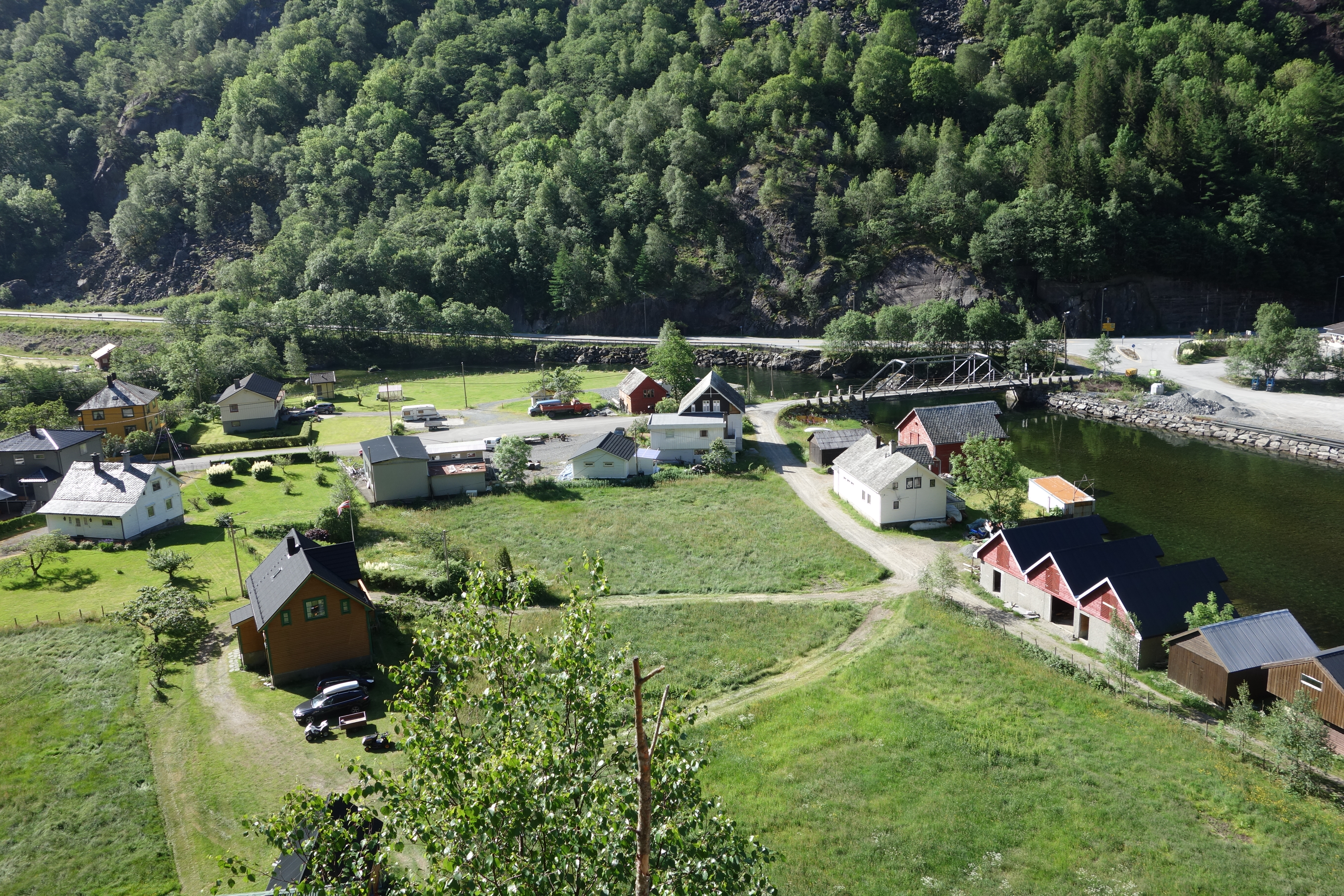
- View of the village
- Interactive map of Fjæra
- Coordinates: 59.87462°N 6.38232°E
- Country: Norway
- Region: Western Norway
- County: Vestland
- District: Sunnhordland
- Municipality: Etne Municipality
- Elevation: 1 m (3.3 ft)
- Time zone: UTC+01:00 (CET)
  - Summer (DST): UTC+02:00 (CEST)
- Post Code: 5598 Fjæra

Fjæra (also known as Åkrabotn) is a village in Etne Municipality in Vestland county, Norway. The village is located at the innermost end of the Åkrafjorden, at the mouth of Fjæraelva (Fjæra River). The European route E134 highway runs through the village, where it enters the Fjæra Tunnel. The highway connects Etne to the neighboring Ullensvang Municipality to the east. Fjæra Chapel is located in the village.

The name of the village is derived from the word fjord.
