= Åkrafjorden =

Fjord in Vestland, Norway

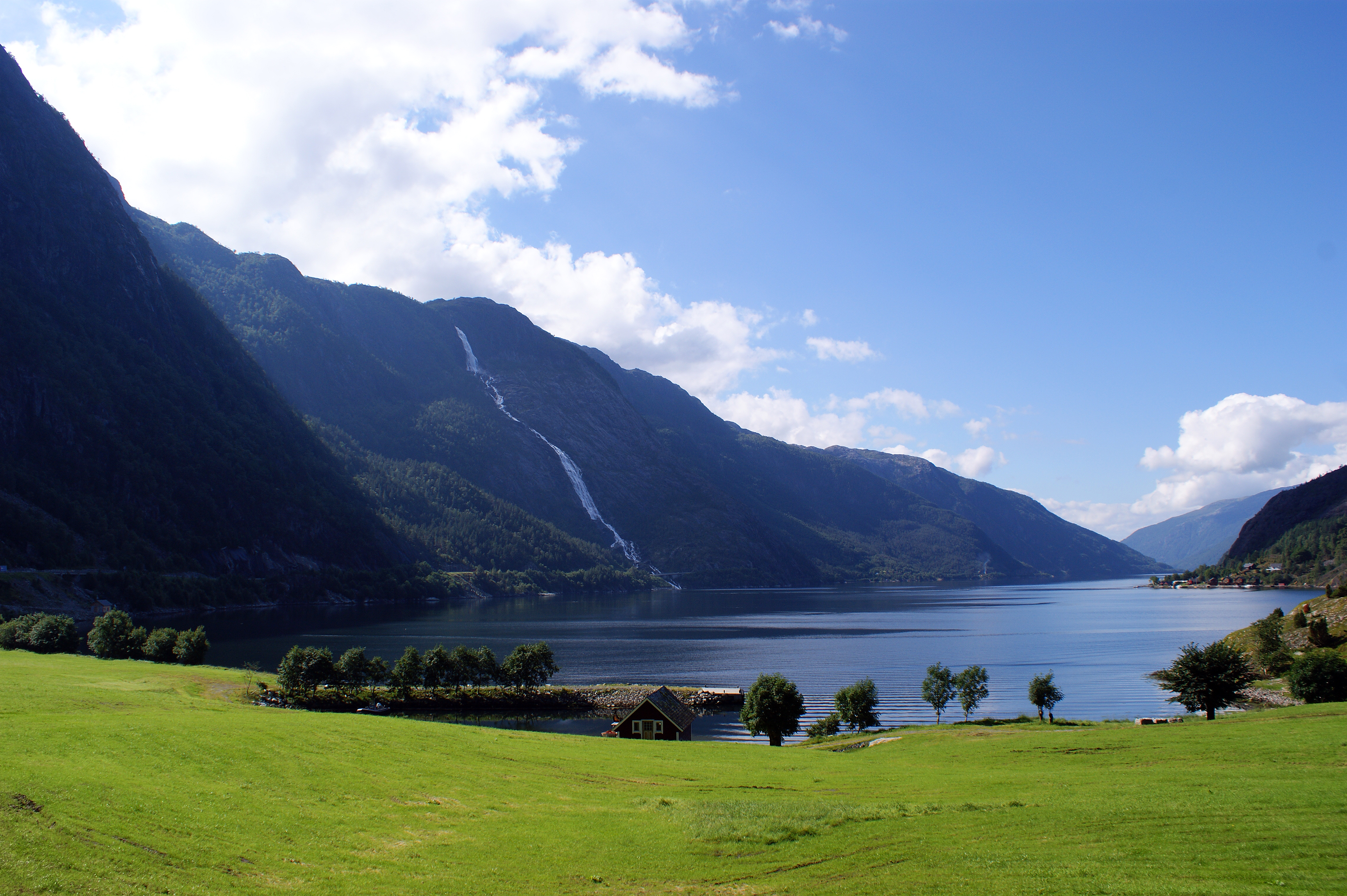
- View of the fjord

- Location of the fjord in Vestland Location of the fjord in Norway
- Location: Vestland county, Norway
- Coordinates: 59.7476°N 5.9983°E
- Type: Fjord
- Primary outflows: Skånevikfjorden
- Basin countries: Norway
- Max. length: 32 kilometres (20 mi)
- Max. depth: −650 metres (−2,130 ft)

Åkrafjorden is a fjord in Vestland county, Norway. It is located in Etne Municipality and Kvinnherad Municipality. The 32-kilometre (20 mi) long fjord reaches a maximum depth of 650 metres (2,130 ft). The fjord flows from the southern part of the Folgefonna National Park, draining the huge Folgefonna glacier. The fjord then flows to the southwest before emptying into the Skånevikfjorden near the village of Utåker. The Langfossen waterfall runs down the steep cliffs on the south side of the fjord, just west of Fjæra.

The village of Fjæra lies at the innermost end of the Åkrafjorden and the village of Åkra lies on the northern shore of the fjord, about mid-way through the fjord. The European route E134 highway runs along the southern shore of the fjord, and due to the steep mountainsides along the fjord, there are several long tunnels as part of the E134 highway that go through the mountains rather than along the shore. The tunnels include the Åkrafjord Tunnel, Fjæra Tunnel, and Markhus Tunnel.

== See also ==
- List of Norwegian fjords
