= Haukelifjell =

Mountain range in southern Norway

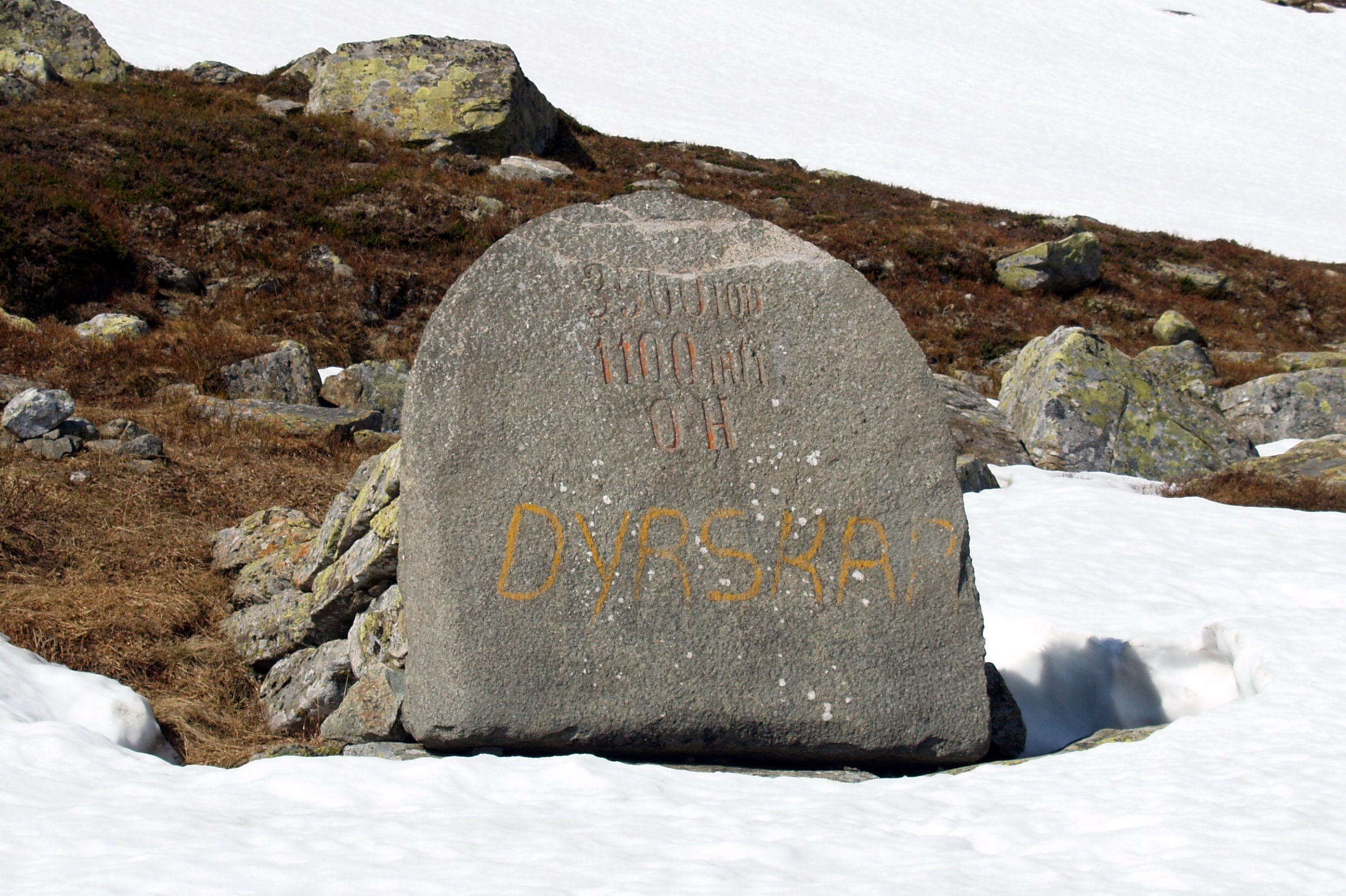
- Bauta at Dyrskar, near the Old Dyrskartunnel in Haukelifjell with set elevation 1,100 m (3,608.92 ft) above sea level

Highest point
- Peak: Sandfloegga, Ullensvang Municipality, Norway
- Elevation: 1,721 m (5,646 ft)
- Coordinates: 59.94629°N 7.14541°E

Geography
- Location: Vestland and Telemark, Norway
- Range coordinates: 59.86264°N 7.20073°E

Haukelifjell is a mountain area and a mountain pass in South Norway. The area is located in Vinje Municipality (in Telemark county) and Ullensvang Municipality (in Vestland county). The mountain area partially overlaps the Hardangervidda mountain plateau, and is defined by the villages of Røldal to the west and Haukeli in the east.

== The mountain pass ==
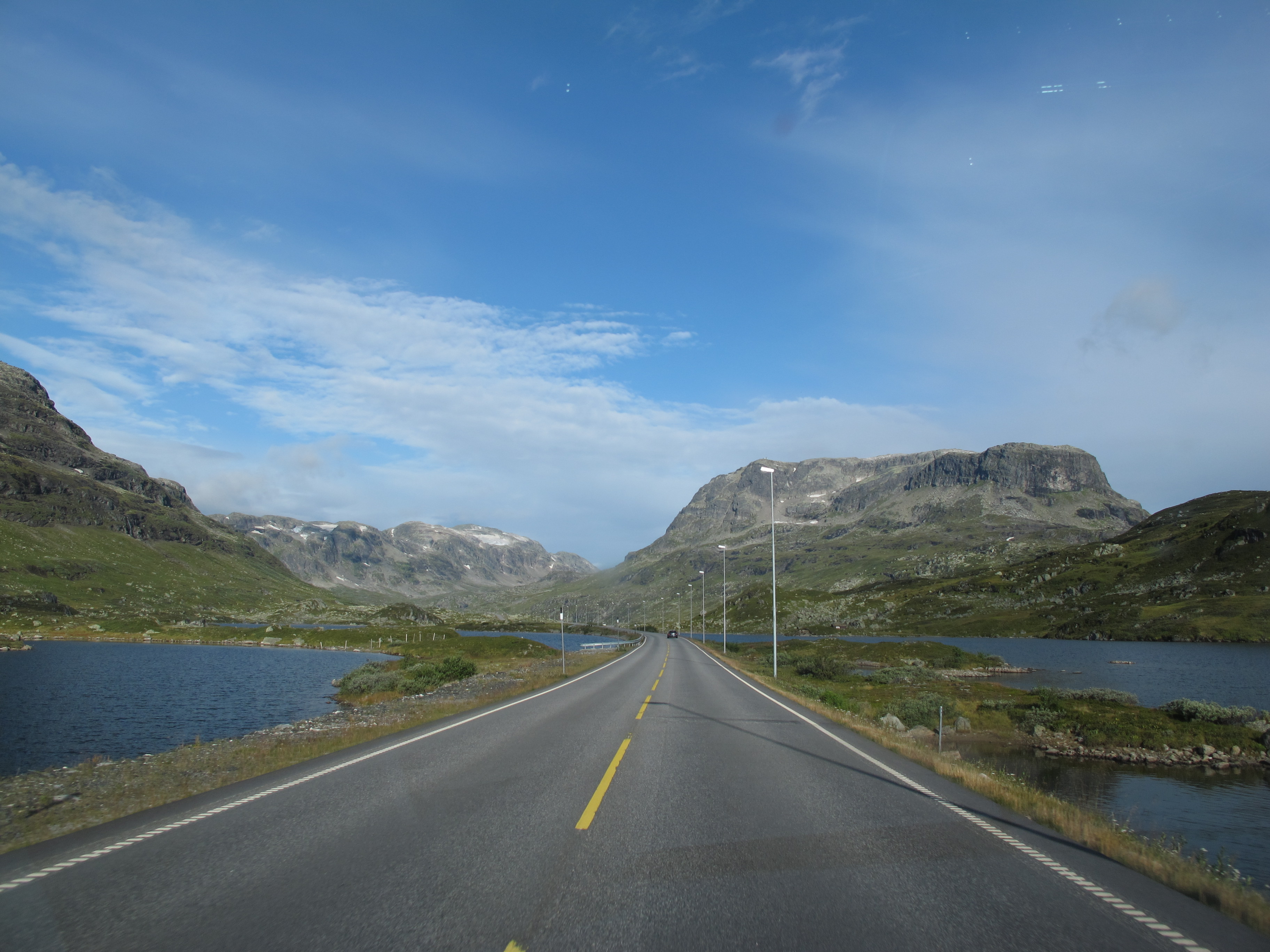
Haukelifjell on the Telemark's border

The mountain pass was opened in 1886 and is part of the European route E134. The road passes through the Haukeli Tunnel, which was the longest tunnel in Norway between its opening in 1968 and 1982. At the former road over Dyrskar, one of the oldest road tunnels in Norway, the Old Dyrskartunnel was opened in 1900. European route E134 over Haukelifjell is the most important transport link between Haugesund and Oslo. In the winter, convoys through the mountain pass and occasionally closed roads is not uncommon, due to a lot of snow and heavy winds.

Haukelifjell Ski Resort and Haukeliseter Fjellstue Hostel (Norwegian Trekking Association) are in the mountain area. The mountain range is a popular destination for skiing in the winter and hiking in the mountains in the summer.
