= Røldal Tunnel =

Road tunnel in Norway

Røldal Tunnel Røldaltunnelen
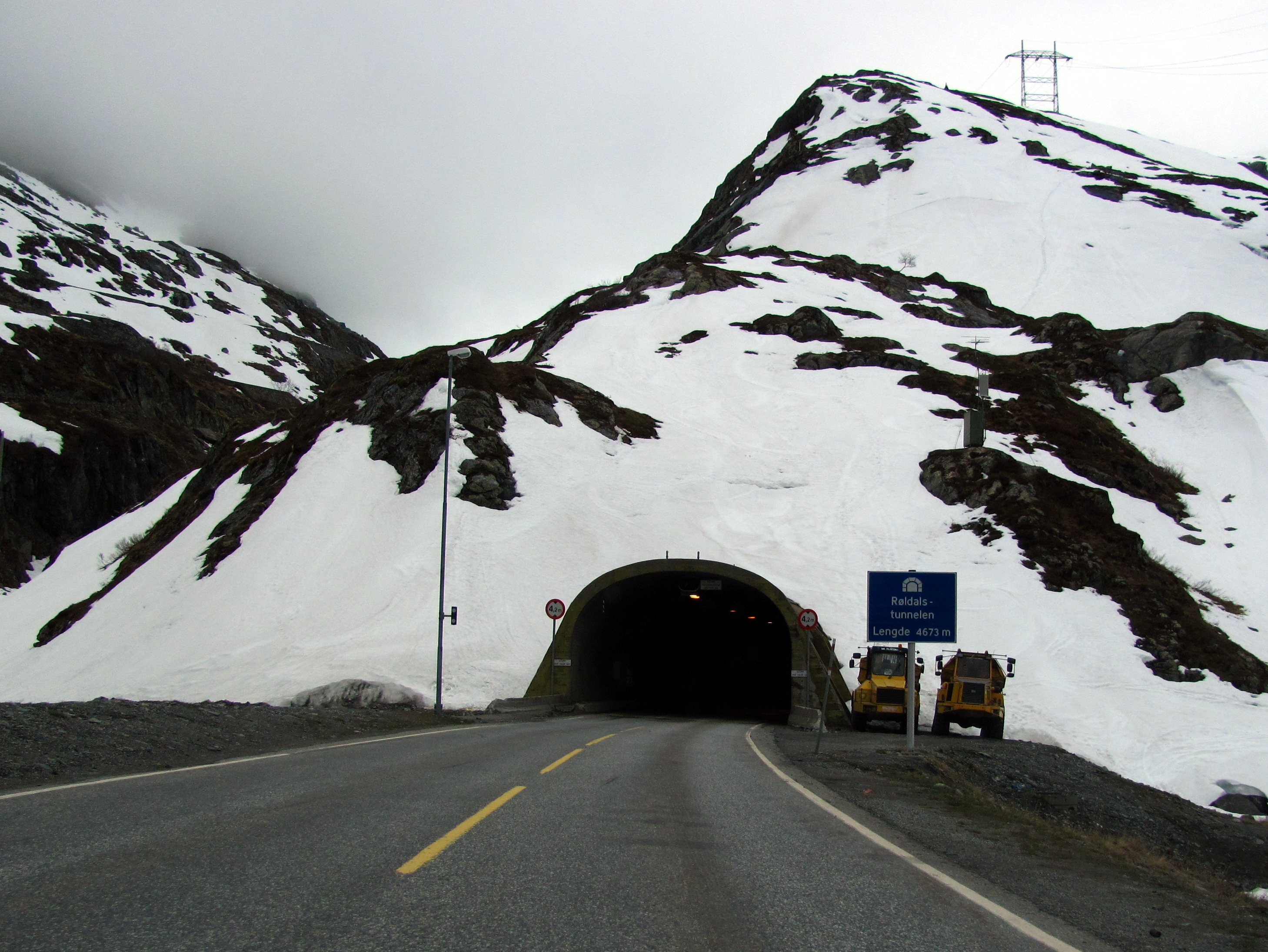
- View of the entrance to the tunnel
- Interactive map of Røldal Tunnel; Røldaltunnelen

Overview
- Location: Vestland, Norway
- Coordinates: 59.8406°N 6.7169°E
- Status: In use
- Route: E134

Operation
- Opened: 21 Feb 1964
- Traffic: Automotive

Technical
- Length: 4,657 metres (15,279 ft)
- Max elevation: 876 metres (2,874 ft)
- Tunnel clearance: 4.2 metres (14 ft)

The Røldal Tunnel is a road tunnel in Ullensvang Municipality in Vestland county, Norway. The 4,657-metre (15,279 ft) tunnel is part of the European route E134 highway and it connects the village of Horda in the Røldal area with the Seljestad area on the other side of the mountains to the west. The tunnel was opened on 21 February 1964 and for four years after its opening, it was the longest road tunnel in Norway (until the Haukeli Tunnel opened). The (much shorter) Seljestad Tunnel is located 275 metres (902 ft) west of the entrance to the Røldal Tunnel.
