= Peter Rosenkrantz Johnsen =

Norwegian journalist and author

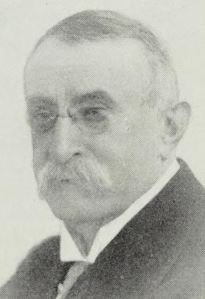
- Born: October 10, 1857; Bergen, Norway
- Died: September 16, 1929 (aged 71)
- Occupation(s): Journalist, author

Peter Marcus Gjøe Rosenkrantz Johnsen (October 10, 1857 – September 16, 1929) was a Norwegian journalist and author.

== Life ==
Johnson was born in Bergen. After attending Tank School in Bergen and the public school in Haugesund in 1871, he worked in Grimsby from 1872 to 1879 before graduating from the school in Haugesund and then working part-time for the newspaper Haugesund Budstikke. He passed his examen artium in Kristiania (now Oslo) in 1882, before he became the editorial secretary at the newspaper Bergens Tidende in 1883. He then contributed to the newspapers Verdens Gang, Dagbladet, and Intelligentssedlerne, and he wrote for newspapers all over Norway, aside from during a sojourn in Copenhagen in 1888. When Henrik Ibsen and his wife Suzannah arrived in Kristiania on July 16, 1891, Johnsen was sent by Dagbladet, and that same afternoon the couple invited him for coffee at the Grand Hotel, where he interviewed them. From 1900 to 1905 he served as the secretary of the Norwegian Authors' Union. Johnsen was a regular art critic for Morgenposten from 1899 to 1917. Johnson covered the ceremony for the maiden voyage of RMS Lusitania in 1907 as a correspondent for Morgenposten.

Johnson made his literary debut in 1885 with the volume Nygifte og andre Smaafortællinger (Newly Married and Other Short Stories). He translated Rudyard Kipling's Barrack-Room Ballads, publishing it as Soldatsange (Soldiers' Songs)—one of which, "Gentlemen-Rankers", was used by Edvard Grieg in his song "Gentlemen-Meninge" (EG 156). Johnson's poem "Haukeligauken (Eg gjekk meg upp paa sæterli)" (The Haukeli Cuckoo: I Went Up to the Mountain Pasture)" from Digte (Poems, 1891) was used by Johannes Haarklou in a composition featured on the 2007 album Shadow Songs.

== Family ==
Johnsen was the son of Konrad Johnsen (1824–1900) and Margrethe Petrea Blankenborg Prytz Bang (1824–1901). His father was a steamship skipper that served as the harbor master in Haugesund from 1869 onward. In 1889, Johnson married Laura Anette Berg (1861–1907) from Trondheim. She also served as his secretary, including during his trips abroad. He later married the teacher Ragna Bjerke. Johnsen was the nephew of the politician, journalist, and author Johan Christian Johnsen. (Note: Peter Rosenkrantz Johnsen's father Konrad was born to Johan Peter Johnsen (c. 1788–1825) and Christiane Heede (1792–1869) as the younger brother of Johan Christian Johnsen (1815–1898).)
