= Tank Upper Secondary School =

Secondary school in Bergen, Norway

Coordinates: 60.3941°N 5.3289°E

- Norwegian: Tanks videregående skole
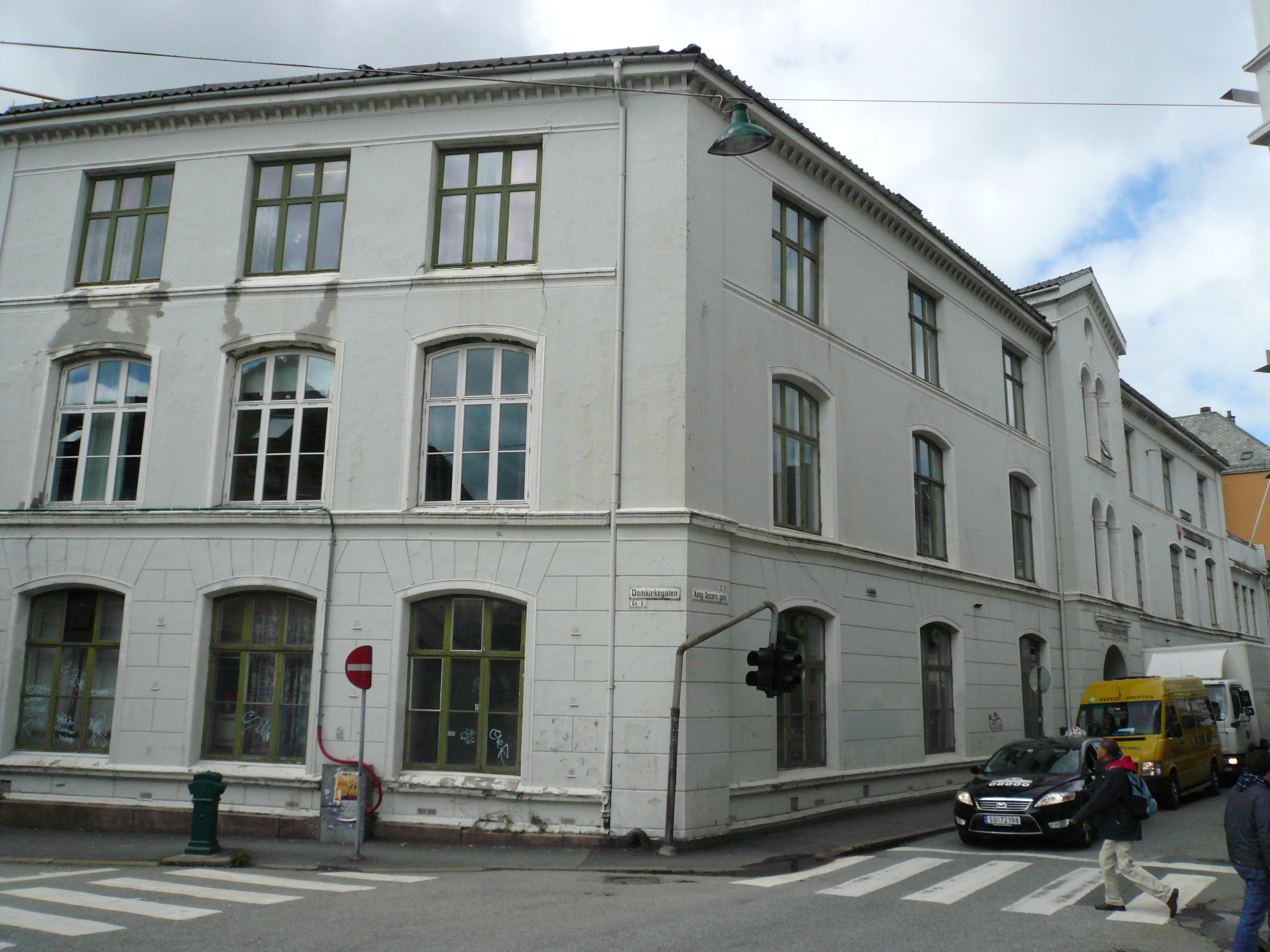

Information
- Established: 1850
- Closed: 2014

Tank Upper Secondary School (Norwegian: Tanks videregående skole) was an upper secondary school in the centre of Bergen, Norway.

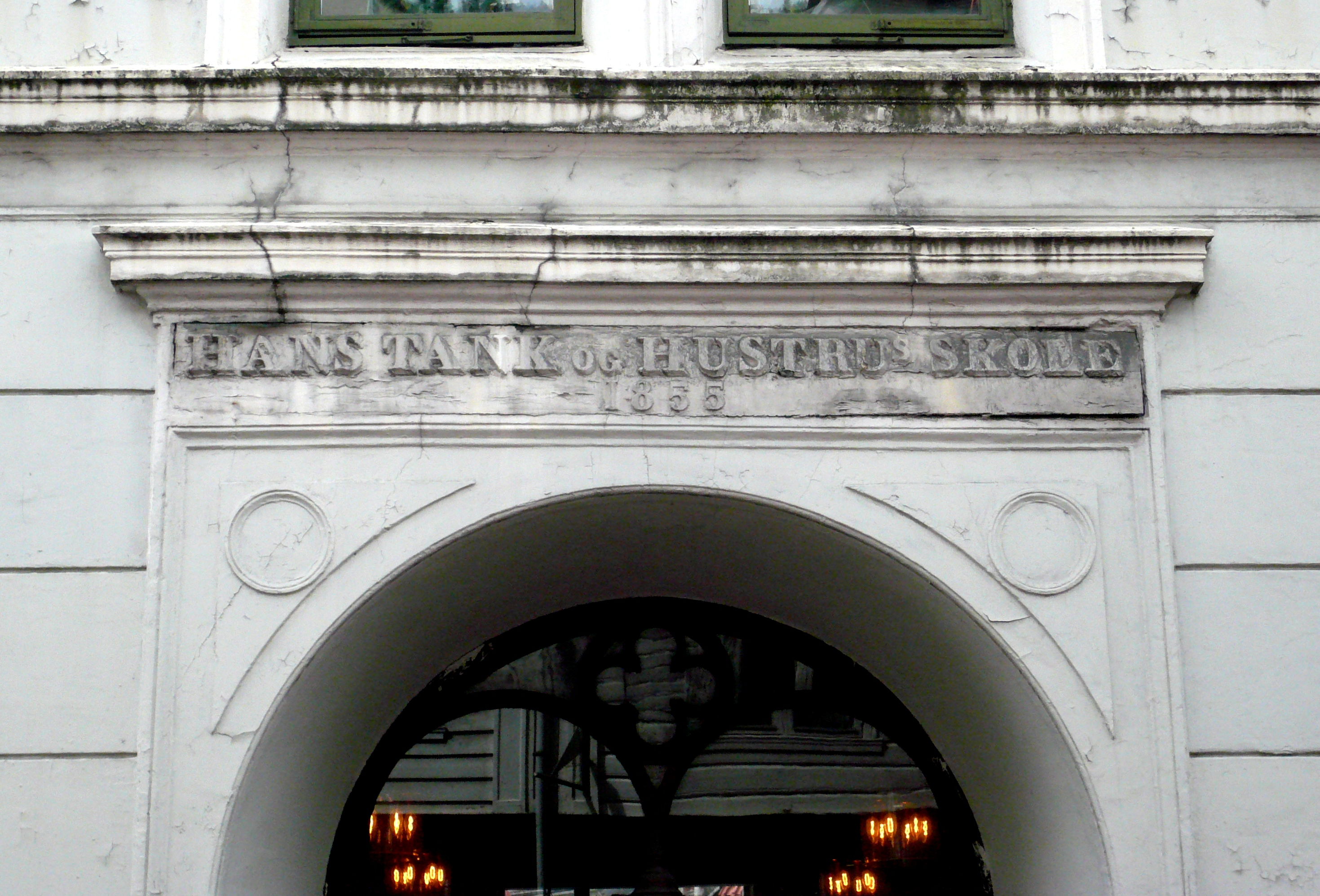
Inscription on the wall entrance of Hans Tank Upper Secondary School, 1855.

The school opened in 1850 as Tank School (Den Tankske Skole), funded by an endowment established by merchant Hans Tank and his wife around fifty years earlier. The school closed in 2014 after it was merged with Bergen Handelsgymnasium and Bjørgvin upper secondary school into the new Amalie Skram upper secondary school.

== Notable alumni ==
- Edvard Hagerup Grieg, composer
- Harald Hove, politician
- Peter Rosenkrantz Johnsen, journalist and author
- Dagfinn Lyngbø, comedian
- Arnulf Øverland, poet
