= Johan Christian Johnsen =

Norwegian politician

Johan Christian Johnsen (23 July 1815 – 2 February 1898) was a Norwegian politician, journalist, author, and editor. He also published an early Norwegian-language encyclopedia, Norsk Haandlexikon.

Johan Johnsen was born at Christianssand (now Kristiansand) in Vest-Agder, Norway. He received trade education by working in several local merchant companies as well as in Antwerp. In 1837 he relocated to Stavanger and became engaged as a merchant. He subsequently entered local politics and was a member of the city council from 1845 to 1851. He was elected to the Norwegian Parliament in 1848, 1851, and 1854, representing the constituency of Stavanger.

Johnsen also founded the magazine Almuevennen in 1848, which he both edited and published for almost 45 years. In 1893, the publication was merged with the daily newspaper Landsbladet. Between 1879 and 1888, he published an encyclopedia in three volumes, Norsk Haandlexikon for almennyttige Kundskaber, and a short version Haandbog til Brug for alle : kortfattet Konversationslexikon. Additionally he wrote and published a number of books, including volumes containing geographic and travel information.

Johnson was the uncle of the journalist and author Peter Rosenkrantz Johnsen (1857–1929).

== Selected works ==
- Frihandelen (1860)
- Missionsblad for Børn (1847)
- Om Lyset. Til Brug i Almueskolen (1867)
- Reise i Universet (1885)
