= Austmannali Tunnel =

Road tunnel in Norway

Austmannali Tunnel Austmannalitunnelen
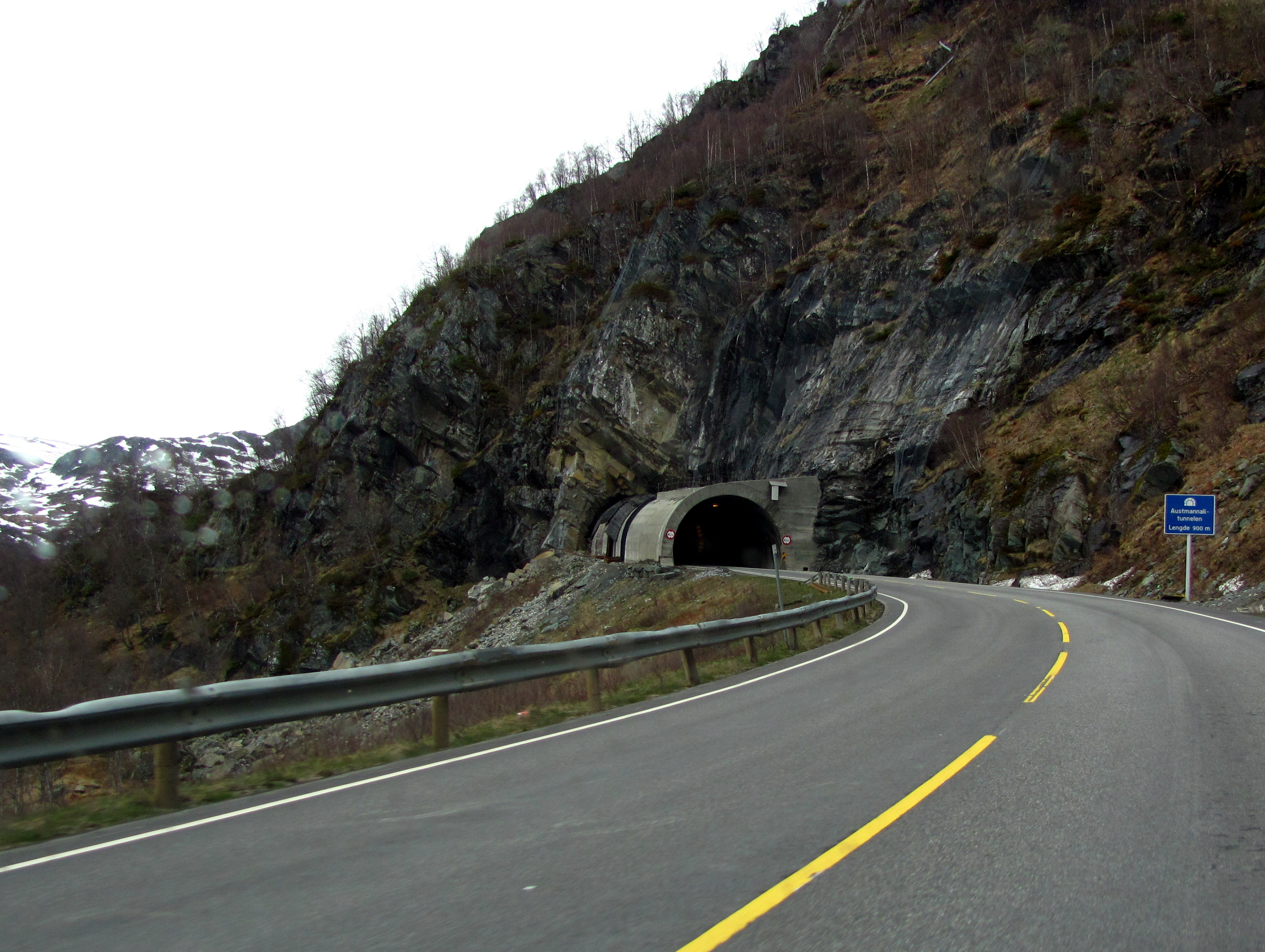
- View of the western entrance
- Interactive map of Austmannali Tunnel; Austmannalitunnelen

Overview
- Location: Vestland, Norway
- Coordinates: 59.8617°N 6.8792°E
- Status: In use
- Route: E134

Operation
- Opened: 1982
- Traffic: Automotive

Technical
- Length: 903 metres (2,963 ft)
- No. of lanes: 2
- Tunnel clearance: 4 metres (13 ft)
- Width: 8.5 metres (28 ft)

The Austmannali Tunnel (Norwegian: Austmannalitunnelen) is a road tunnel in Ullensvang Municipality in Vestland county, Norway. The 903-metre (2,963 ft) long tunnel is part of the European route E134 highway as it goes up the Austmannlia mountain. The tunnel is located just south of the lake Valldalsvatnet, about 5 kilometres (3.1 mi) northeast of the village of Røldal. The tunnel was built in 1982 to replace a steep section of the highway that was built in 1880 which had a road grade of 8.3% and included five sharp hairpin turns. The new tunnel is wider than the old road and it is one large horseshoe curve with a steady increase in elevation through the whole tunnel.

On 20 November 2009, there was a large rock slide and about 100 cubic metres (3,500 cu ft) of rock crushed the lower entrance area of the tunnel, completely blocking it. The concrete structure supporting the entrance was completely destroyed.
