= Hans Tank =

Norwegian skipper

Hans Tank (10 August 1742 – 17 March 1804) was a Norwegian skipper, merchant and endowment founder, born in Bergen. He is particularly known for his donations that resulted in the establishment of Tank School (Den Tankske Skole), which opened in 1850, more than forty years after his death. He lived in Denmark-Norway.
