= Old Dyrskartunnel =

Road tunnel in Norway

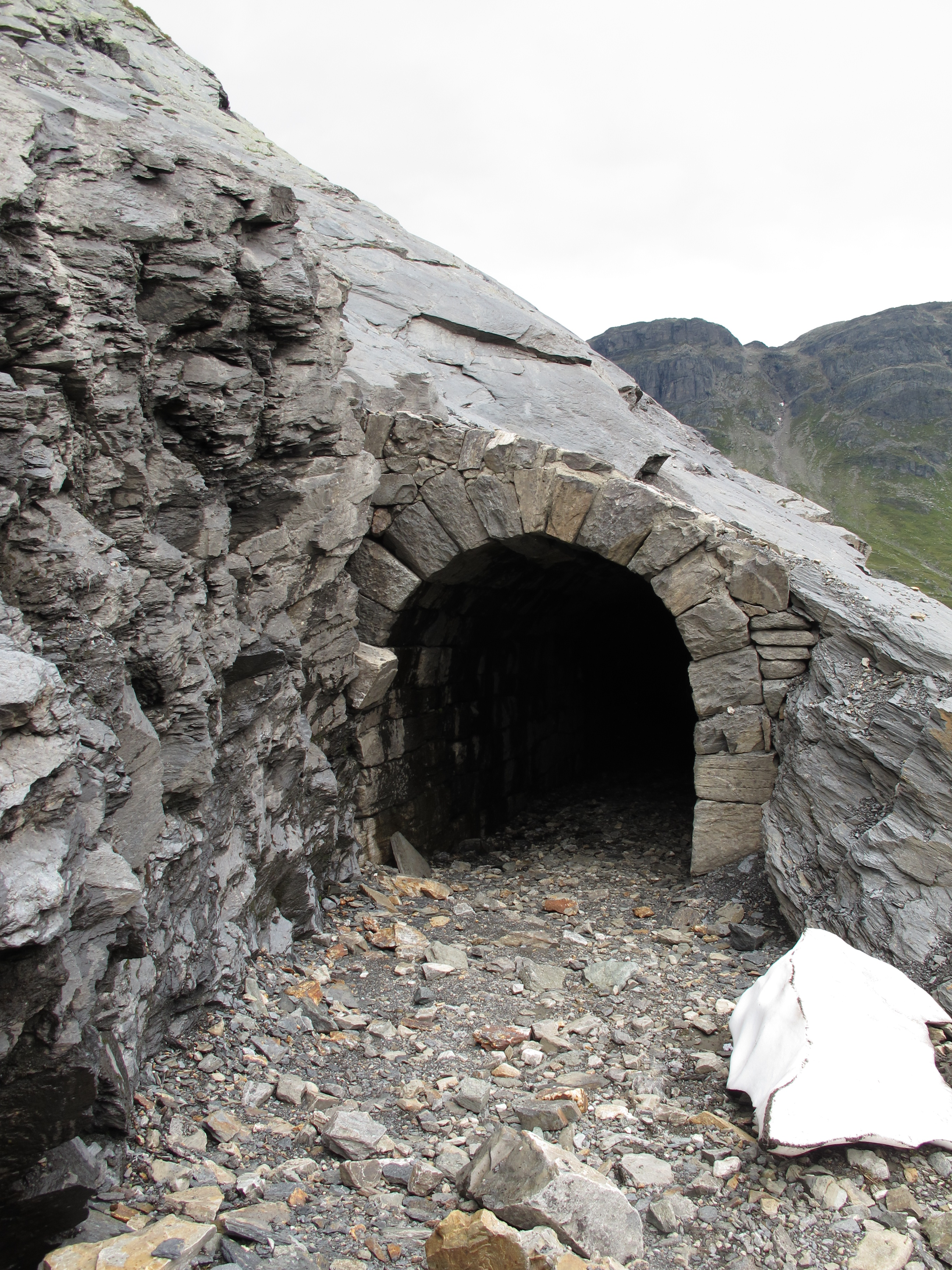
- Entrance from south
- Interactive map of Old Dyrskartunnel

Overview
- Location: Ullensvang Municipality, Norway
- Coordinates: 59°50′41″N 007°03′14″E
- Status: Closed for traffic
- Route: E134; Old Dyreskartunnel is on a former road

Operation
- Opened: 1900 - 1919
- Traffic: no

Technical
- Length: approx. 60 metres (200 ft)
- Tunnel clearance: 350 centimetres (140 in)
- Width: 250 centimetres (98 in)

Old Dyrskartunnel (Norwegian: Gamle Dyrskartunnel) is a road tunnel in Ullensvang Municipality in Vestland county, Norway. The tunnel was built in 1900 and is one of the oldest road tunnels in Norway. Earlier, the main road over the mountains between Haugesund in Vestlandet and Østlandet (the capital of Oslo) went through the tunnel. The current European route E134 pass through the newer Haukeli Tunnel in a parallel corridor. The Old Dyreskartunnel is located on the slope above the current tunnel.

== History ==
The oldest of the three former road routes in the area opened in 1886 without the tunnel, but it was commenced shortly thereafter and the tunnel opened in 1900. The tunnel is about 60 metres long, for a large part hewn out of the rock, but with a natural stone arch in the south end. It was built to improve conditions in winter due to heavy snow and high avalanche danger.

The tunnel was only used for 19 years, in 1919 the road corridor was shifted to the other side of the mountain pass.

== Access ==
Perhaps the easiest, not the shortest, but the finest access is to park at the highest point on the road through Dyrskar. It contains a monument that marks the height, and then follow the old road back to the tunnel. Along this way you get a nice view of Dyrskar and the lake Ulevåvatn.

== Gallery ==
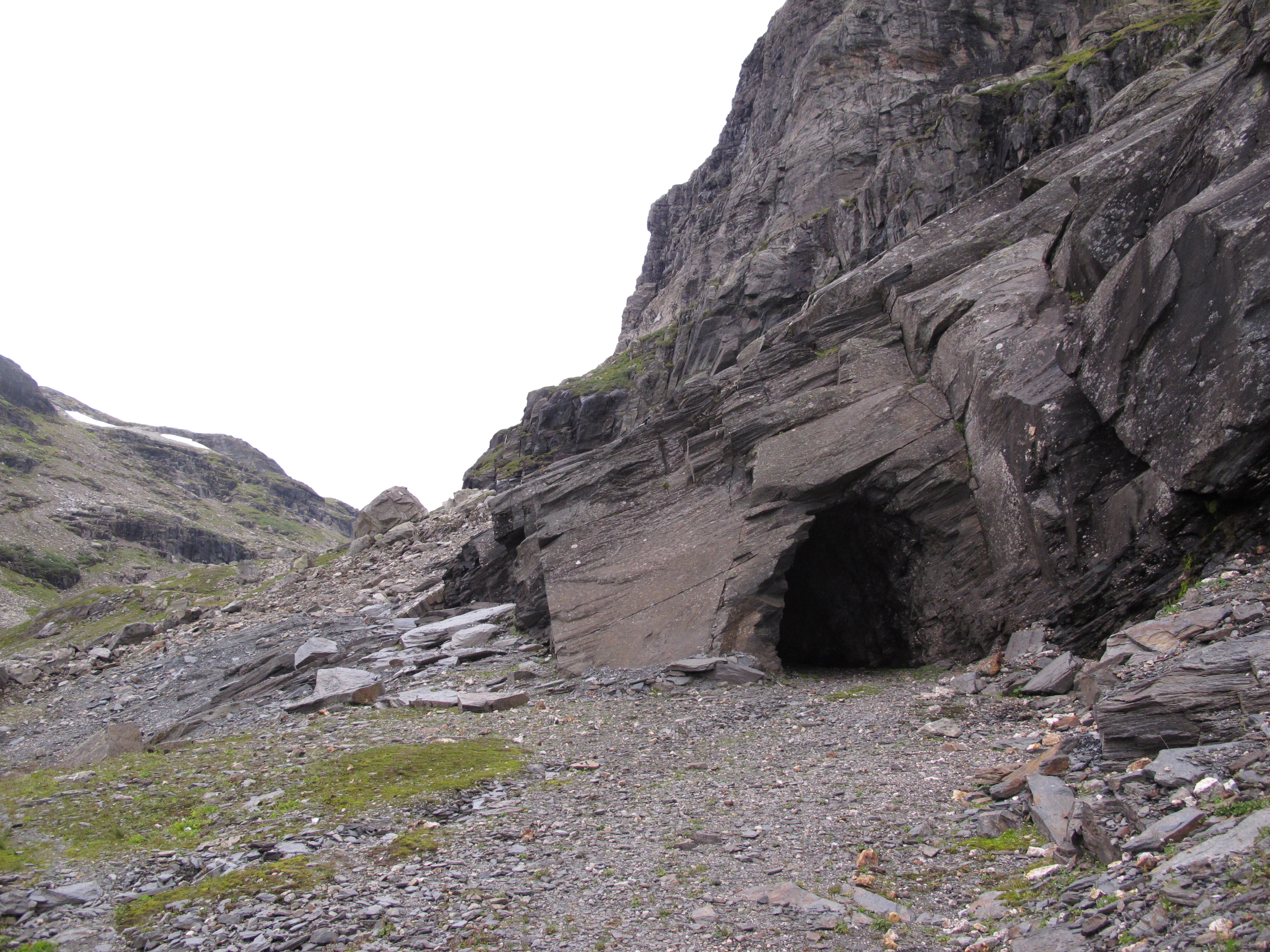
Entrance to the tunnel from north.

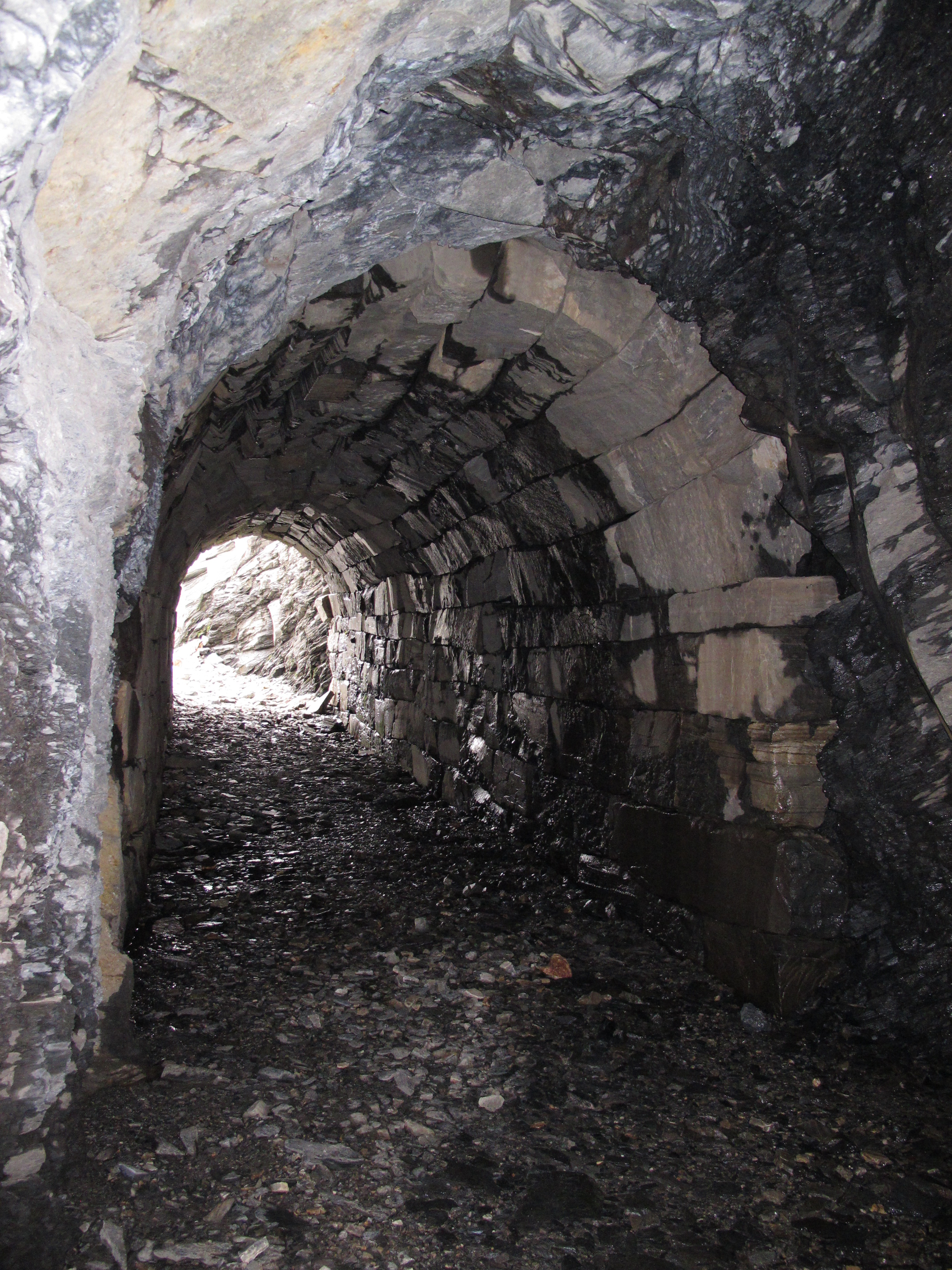
Transition from the rock to cut masonry arch inside the tunnel, picture from the south.

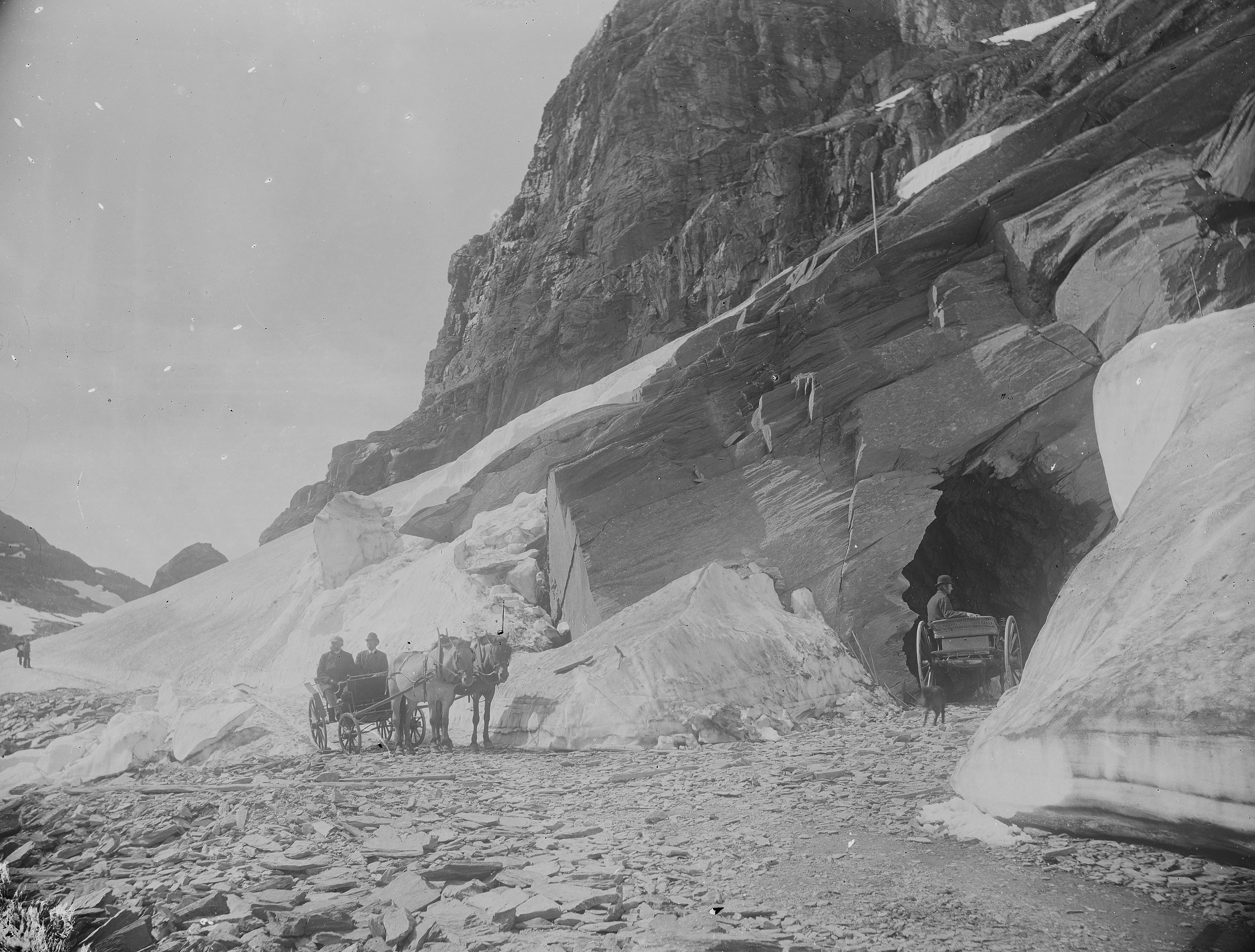
View of the Old Dyreskartunnel, around c. 1900.
Photo: National Library of Norway

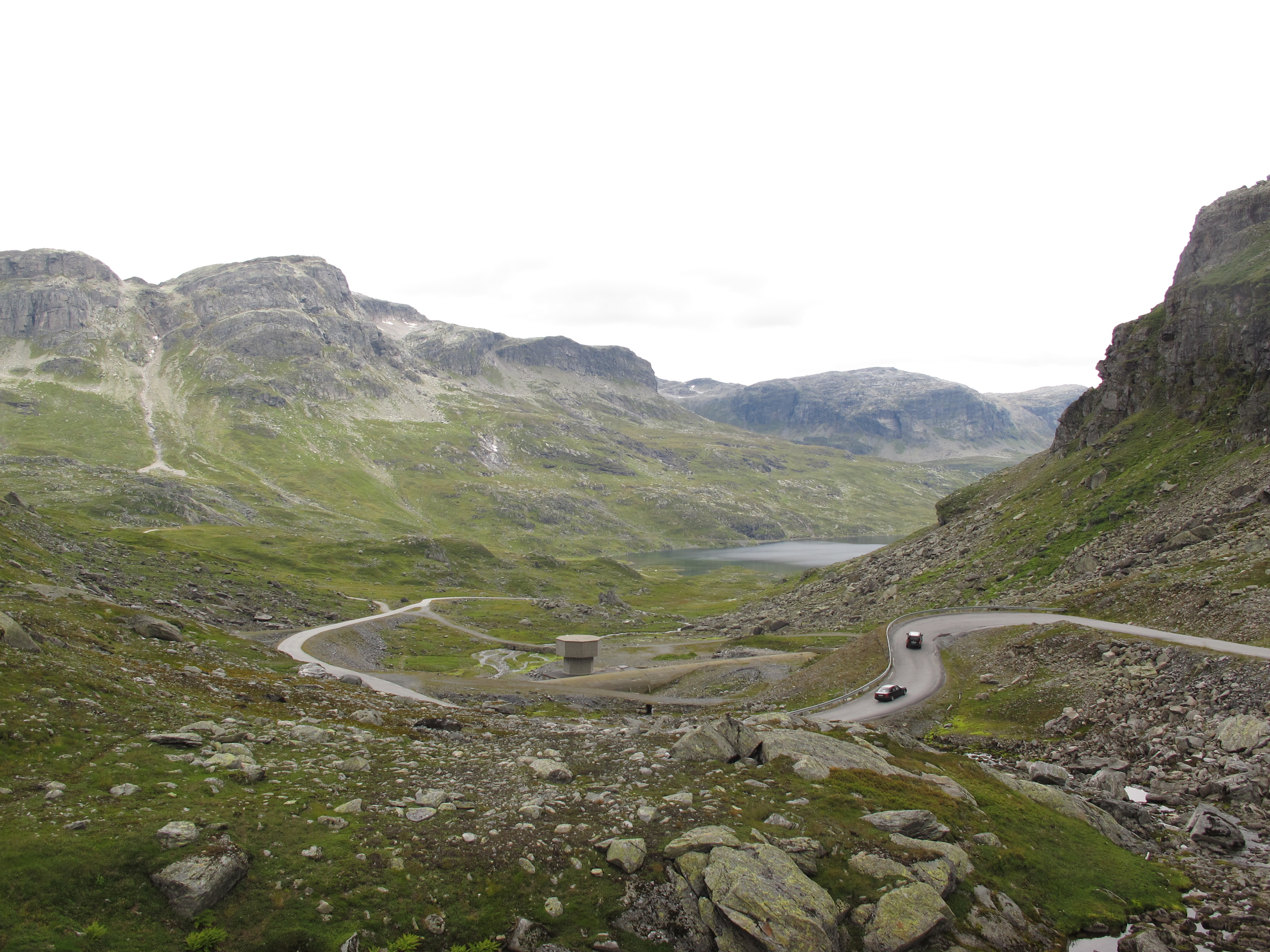
Overview from just south of the tunnel beyond Dyrskar. The road from 1919 snakes its way up the valley. The current E134 inside concrete culvert with a tower in the middle of the picture.
