= Langfossen =

Langfossen Langfoss
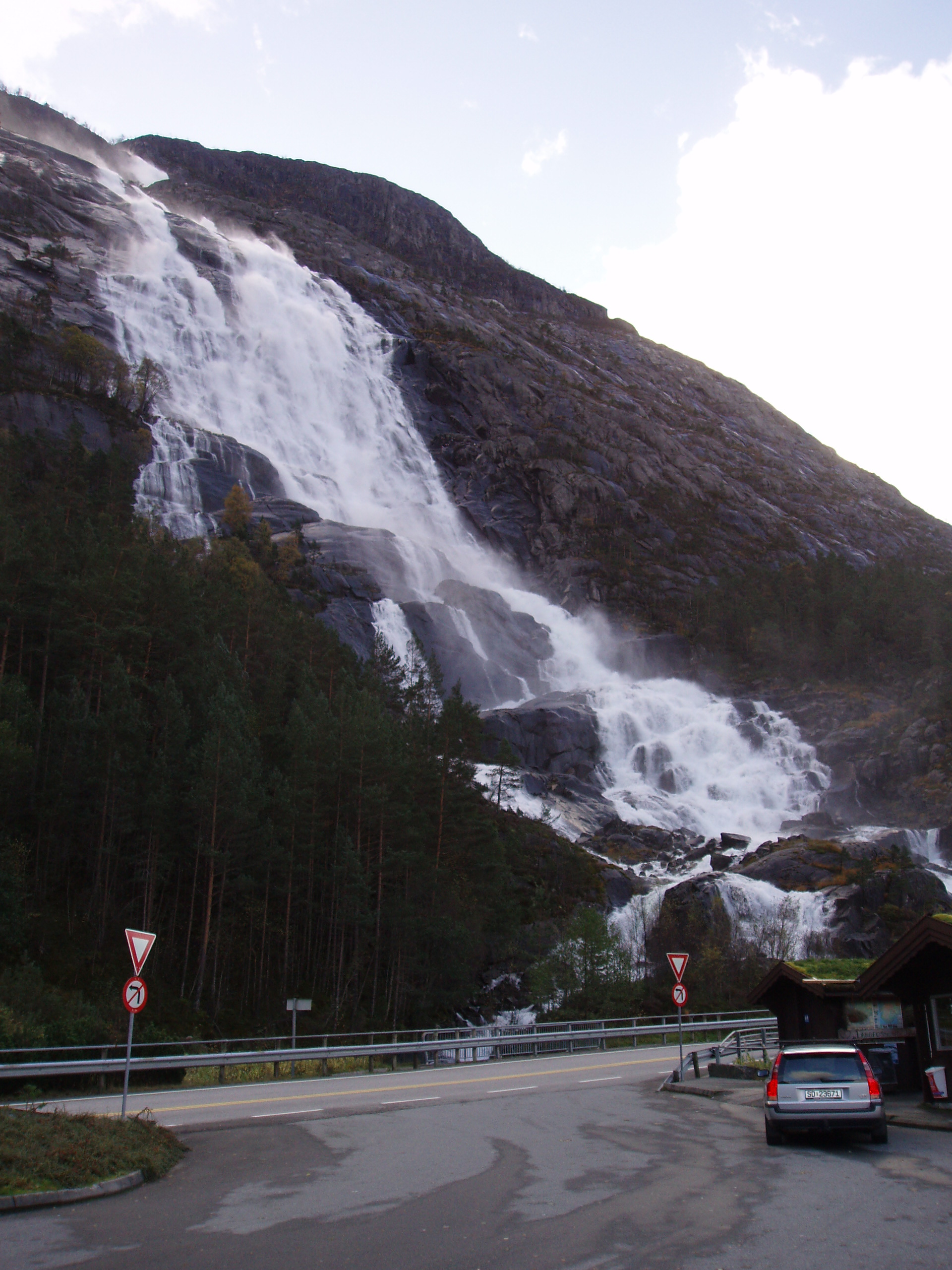
- View of the Langfossen waterfall (2006)
- Interactive map of Langfossen; Langfoss
- Location: Vestland, Norway
- Coordinates: 59.8400276°N 6.343217529°E
- Type: Sliding horsetail
- Elevation: 228 metres (748 ft)
- Total height: 612 metres (2,008 ft)
- Number of drops: 1
- Longest drop: 612 metres (2,008 ft)
- Total width: 107 metres (351 ft)
- Average width: 76 metres (249 ft)
- Run: 710 metres (2,330 ft)
- Average flow rate: 8 m^{3}/s (280 cu ft/s)

Langfossen or Langfoss is a waterfall located in Etne Municipality in Vestland county, Norway. The waterfall is located about 5 kilometres (3.1 mi) southwest of the village of Fjæra. The water falls down a towering mountain, a total distance of about 612 metres (2,008 ft) before the water leaps out into Åkrafjorden at the base of the mountain. European route E134 runs along the base of the waterfall, making access very easy.

The World Waterfall Database declared this waterfall to be one of the "best in the world". In March 2011 CNN/Budget Travel sat Langfossen as one of the worlds ten most beautiful waterfalls. The waterfall is one of the few in Norway that has not been used in hydroelectric power generation, so it is still in its natural state.

== History ==
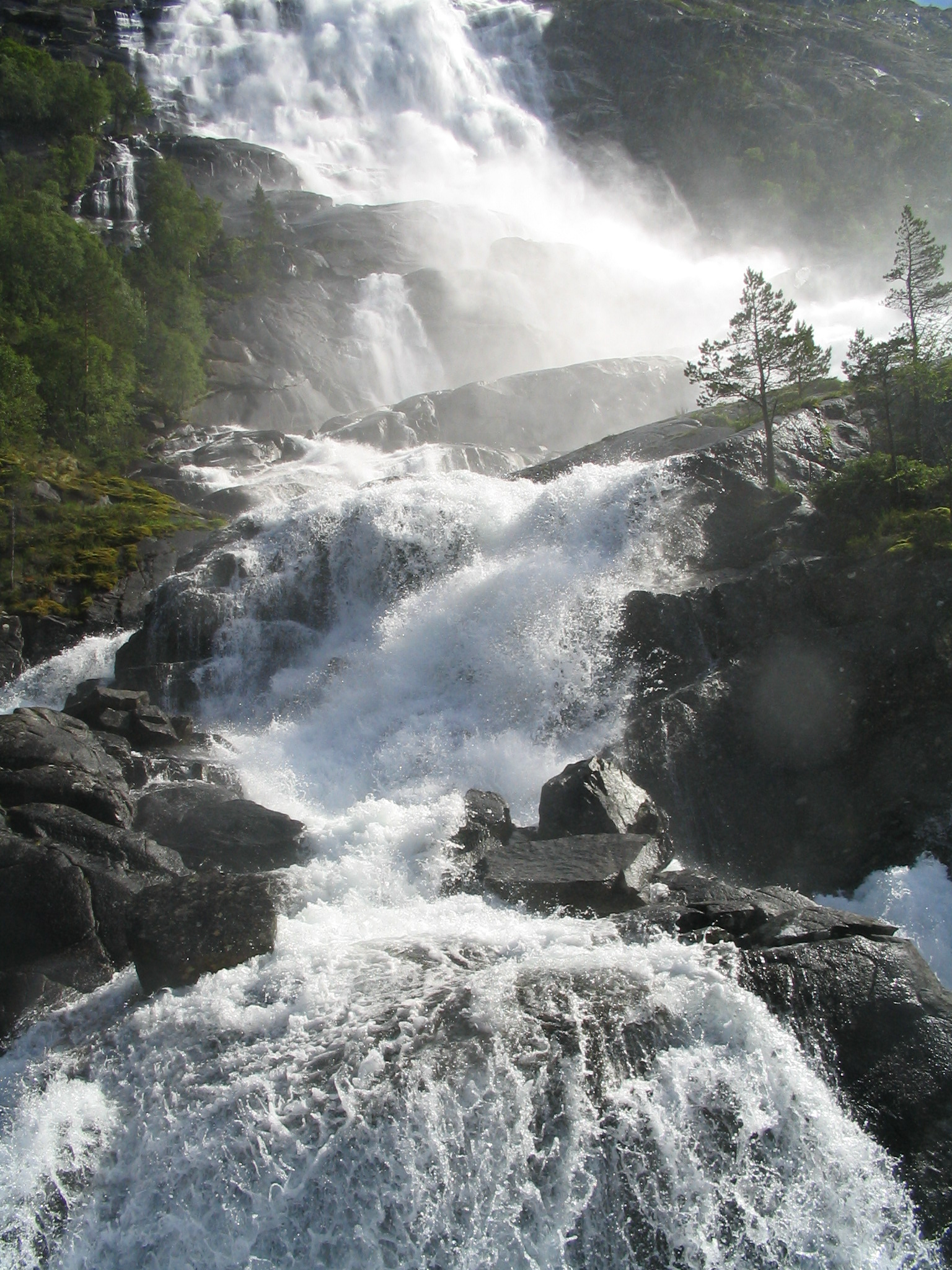
Langfoss fall

Before Langfoss became a popular travel spot, it had already been familiar to the people living in the area. Its impressive height and strong flow made it a noticeable feature in the local landscape for a very long time. When transportation in Norway began to improve, the waterfall became easier to reach. A major change occurred when the E134 highway was built along the fjord directly across from Langfoss. This allowed people traveling by car to see the waterfall clearly without needing to hike there.

As time passed, small facilities for visitors were gradually added. Viewing areas, places to sit and rest, and picnic spots were introduced, and walking paths were created to allow people to explore more closely. These trails were later improved to make them safer and more comfortable for hikers. Recent projects have mainly focused on protecting nature. Carefully placed stone steps now follow the natural slope of the hillside, helping reduce soil erosion and lowering the environmental impact of frequent foot traffic.

In the years that followed, Langfoss gained more attention both nationally and internationally. It was voted the most beautiful waterfall in the world in 2006 and was listed among the top ten most beautiful waterfalls in 2011. These recognitions encouraged more tourism and continued support for conservation. Despite the growing number of visitors, Langfoss has stayed mostly unchanged. While many other waterfalls in Norway have been used for hydroelectric power, Langfoss still flows freely, keeping its natural scenery and dramatic appearance intact.

== Characteristics ==
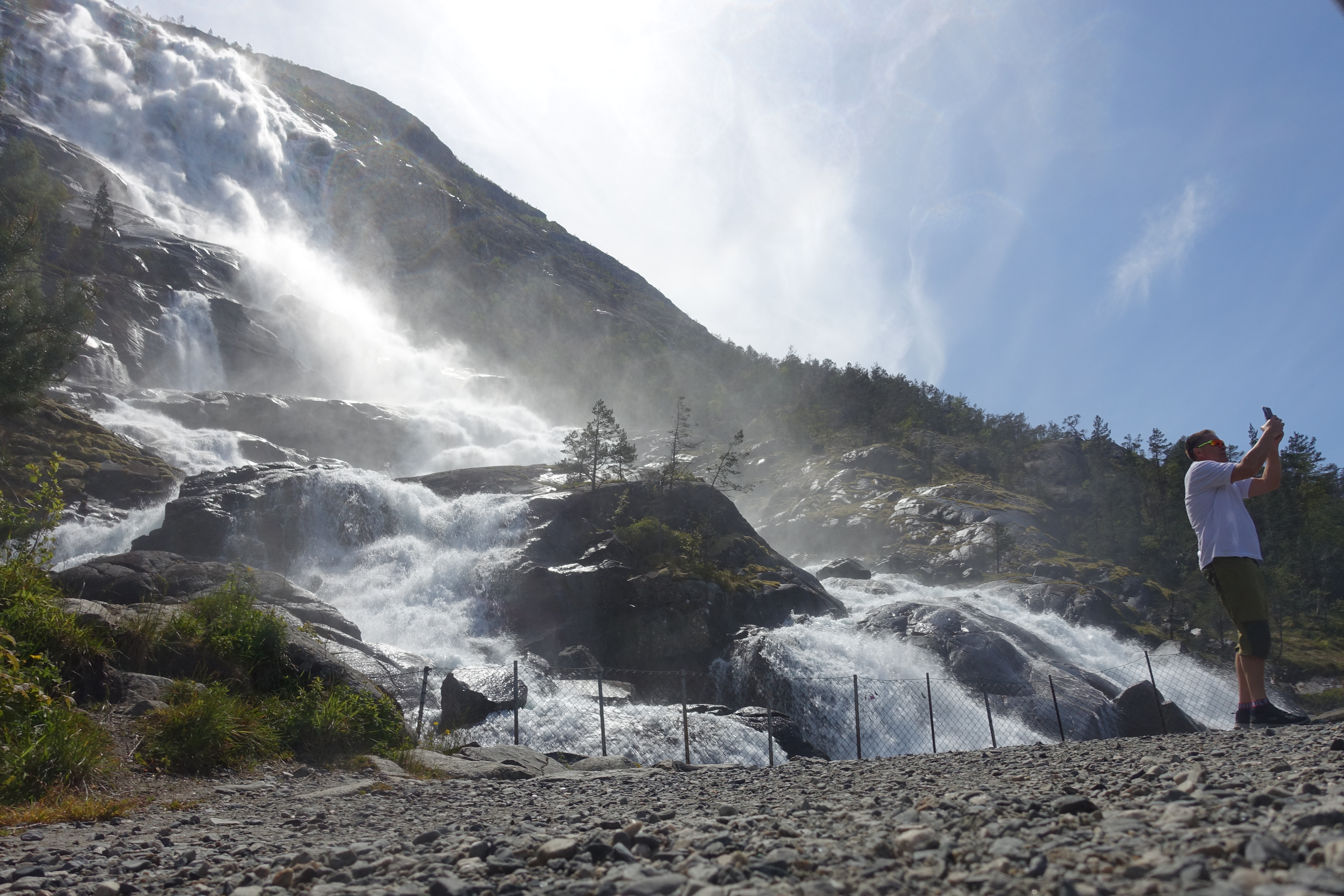
Langfoss falls

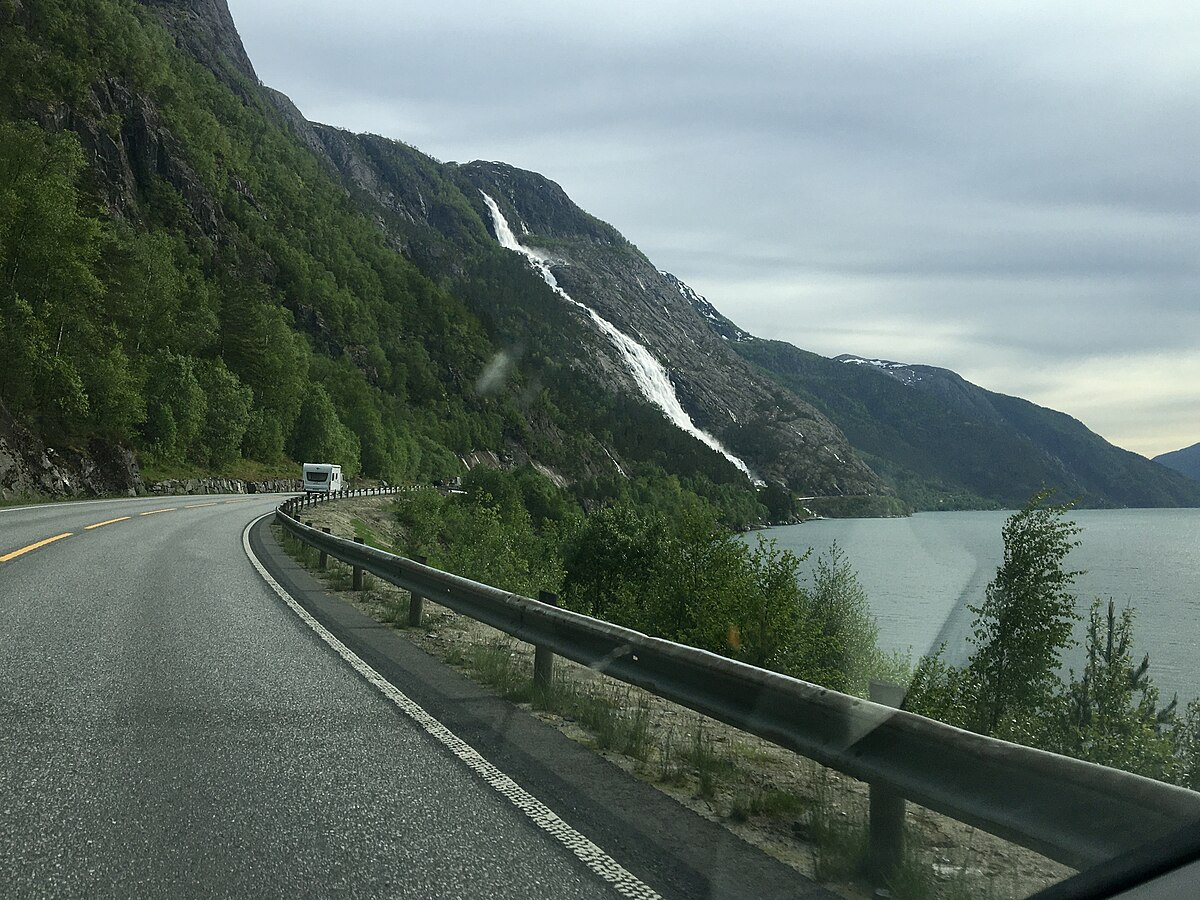
European route E134

Langfoss is located in western Norway, tucked inside a narrow valley in Etne. Travelers often spot it long before reaching the area because the water forms a bright, silver line sliding down the mountainside. The stream starts high on the uplands and gradually descends toward the Åkrafjord, covering more than half a kilometre from its source to the shoreline.

Rather than plunging straight over a cliff, Langfoss flows in a slanted motion, almost as if it is gliding down the side of an angled rock wall. The water stays in contact with the mountain for most of its journey, giving the rock face a clean, polished look under the shifting layer of water. When sunlight falls across it, the waterfall can appear misty and soft, which is why many visitors describe the scene as peaceful even when the water volume is high.

The stream feeding the waterfall comes from a small basin in the mountains, and its flow changes naturally throughout the year. In late spring, melting snow from higher elevations increases the strength and width of the fall. During summer the stream narrows, but the long ribbon-like shape remains clearly visible. No part of the watercourse has been diverted for hydroelectric use, so Langfoss still behaves much as it would have centuries ago.

From the E134 highway, people can see the waterfall clearly from across the fjord without stepping out of their vehicles. Several viewpoints along the road offer full views of the mountainside. Those who want to get closer can hike a trail that climbs up the slope. Local volunteers have made small improvements to this path placing stones and stabilizing loose ground to help reduce erosion.

Langfoss appears frequently in travel guides because of the landscape that surrounds it. The long, slanted stream, the calm fjord below and the dark cliffs around it create a setting that feels untouched and open. Even travellers who have visited many waterfalls in Norway often remember this one because it seems to slide directly into the fjord rather than dropping into a pool.

== Geography ==
The landscape around Langfoss was formed by glaciers during the last Ice Age. The waterfall flows down a steep rock surface made mostly of strong, erosion-resistant stone. Beneath this layer, there are softer rocks that have worn away more easily over time. This difference in rock hardness helps create the wide and spreading shape of the waterfall. The fjord and nearby valleys were formed when the glaciers melted and the flowing water cut deep paths through the mountains, revealing the rugged scenery seen today.

The climate in the Langfoss area is influenced by its coastal location near the fjord. This results in mild temperatures and a high amount of rainfall throughout the year. The waterfall changes with the seasons. In spring and early summer, melting snow from the mountains increases the water flow, making the waterfall stronger and more powerful. In winter, some parts of the waterfall may freeze, creating unique ice formations. The natural surroundings include coniferous forests, mountain plants, and wildlife that are typical of the western Norway fjord environment.

== Preservation ==
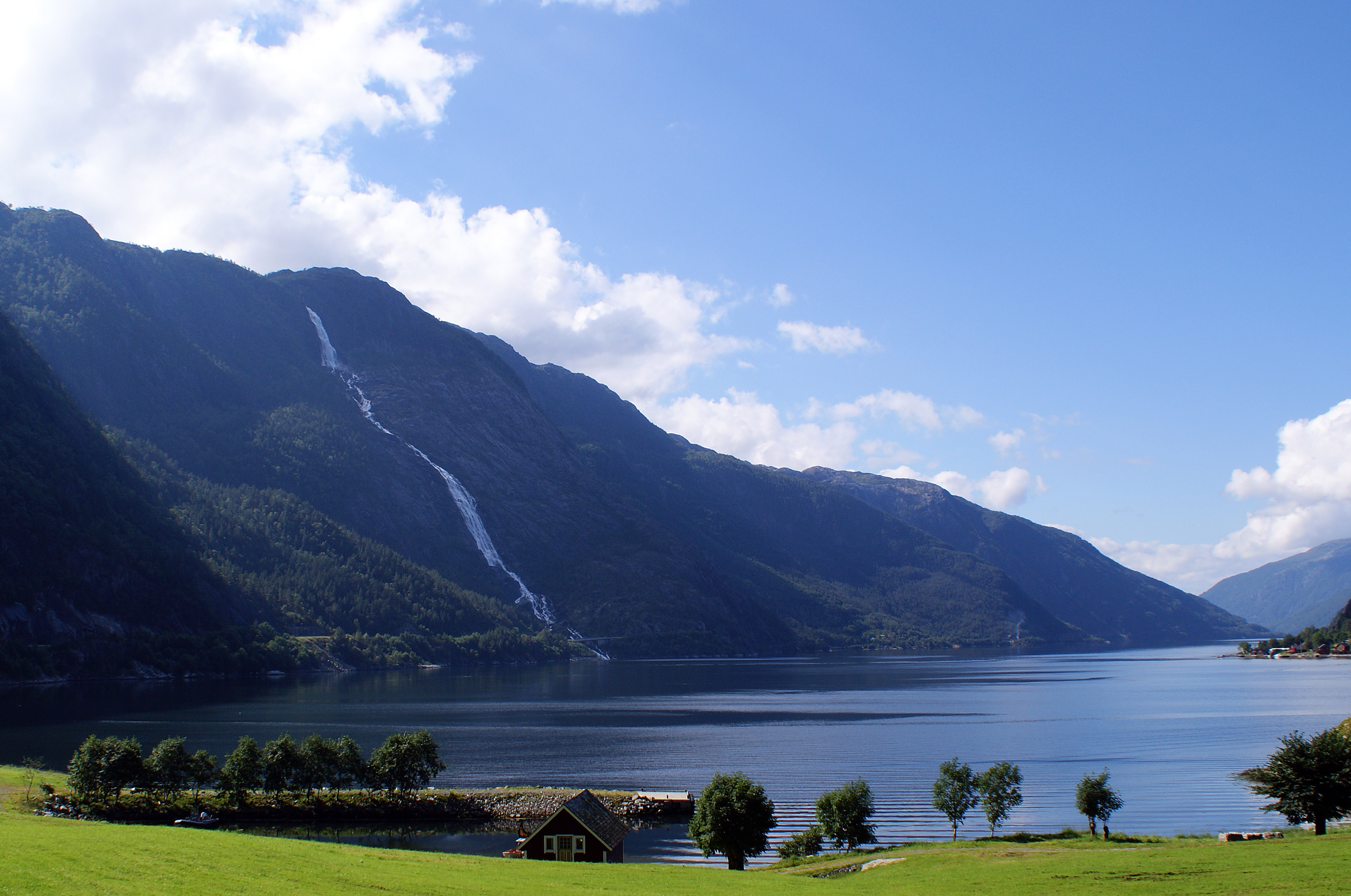
Åkrafjorden Langfossen

Due to its ecological and scenic significance, Langfoss Waterfall and its surrounding areas are the focus of several preservation and environmental protection efforts. Local authorities and environmental organizations have implemented measures to safeguard the site’s natural landscape, maintain water quality, and protect native plant and animal species. Human activities near the waterfall are regulated to reduce pollution, erosion, and other forms of environmental degradation.These protective measures aim to preserve the natural beauty and ecological integrity of Langfoss for future generations to experience and enjoy.

=== Sustainability ===
Sustainability initiatives in the Langfoss region emphasize responsible management of tourism and community development. With the increasing number of visitors each year, strategies have been introduced to minimize the environmental impact while ensuring that local residents benefit from tourism-related activities.

Efforts include limiting vehicle access near the waterfall, promoting eco-friendly transportation, providing educational signage about environmental awareness, and supporting local businesses that adopt sustainable practices. Through these actions, Langfoss continues to serve as both a natural attraction and an example of balanced environmental stewardship.

== Tourism ==
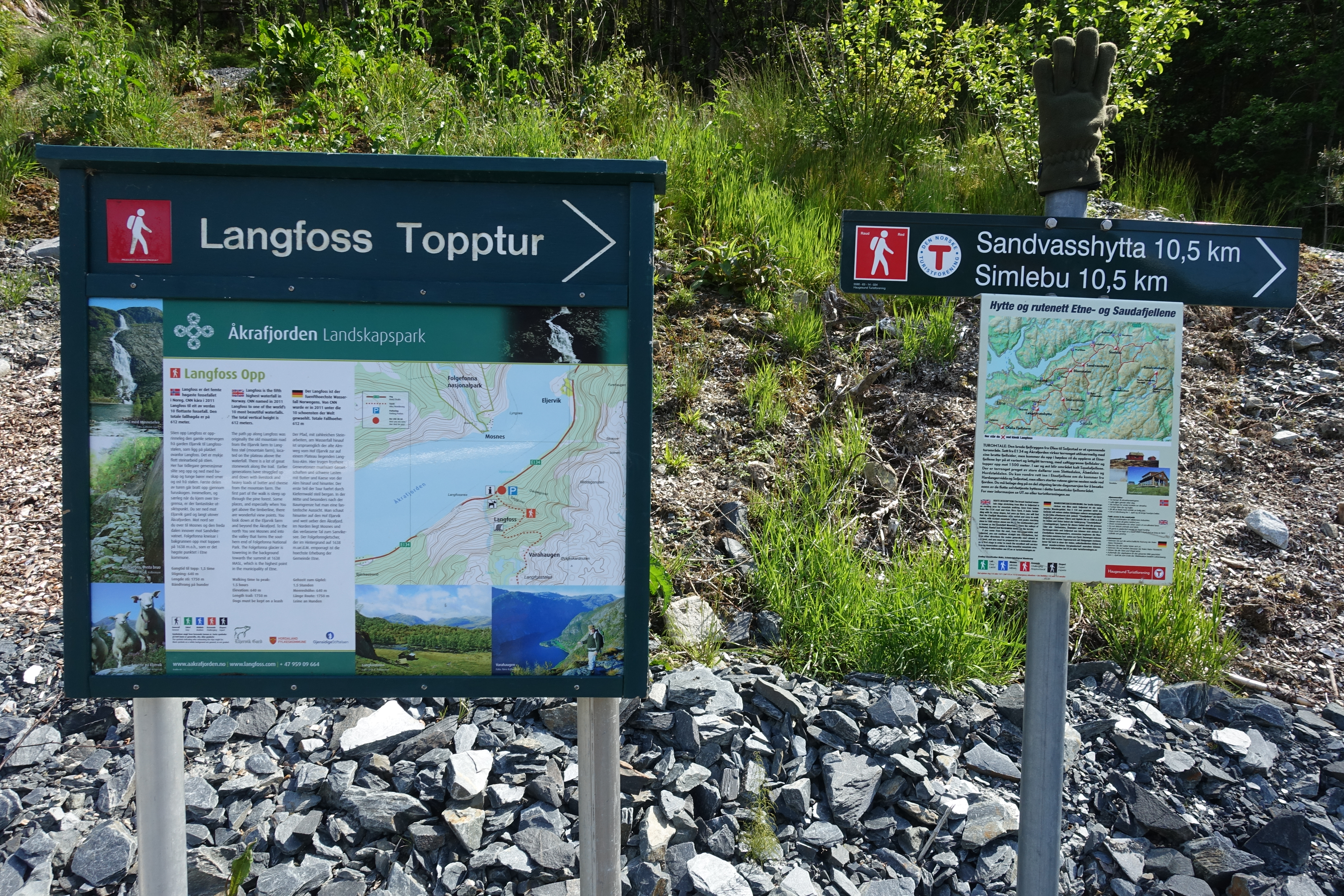
Langfoss tourist information board

Langfossen is one of Norway’s most beautiful waterfalls and a popular place for tourists. It is located in Etne Municipality, Vestland County. Tourism at Langfossen includes sightseeing, hiking, fjord cruises, photography, relaxing, and enjoying nature.

Visitors can enjoy sightseeing and fjord cruises to see the waterfall’s amazing 612-meter drop into the Åkrafjorden. The waterfall is easy to see because it is near the main road, European Route E134. Boat trips on the fjord give visitors a great view of the waterfall with mountains and green valleys around it.

Hiking is another popular activity. There are marked paths from the bottom of the waterfall up the mountain. Hikers can enjoy wide views of the fjord and the surrounding area. The trails allow visitors to get close to the natural beauty of western Norway .

Langfossen is also a good place for photography and enjoying nature. The waterfall, rocks, and forest make a beautiful scene. Many people come to take pictures and enjoy the quiet and peaceful nature around it.

Besides natural attractions, Langfossen offers relaxing and cultural activities. Visitors can rest at local cafés or picnic areas near the hiking paths, try local food, and meet friendly locals, showing the traditional hospitality of the area .

Langfossen is not used for hydropower, so it keeps its wild and natural character. Its easy access, beautiful scenery, and calm atmosphere make it one of Norway’s best destinations for eco-tourism.

== Gallery ==
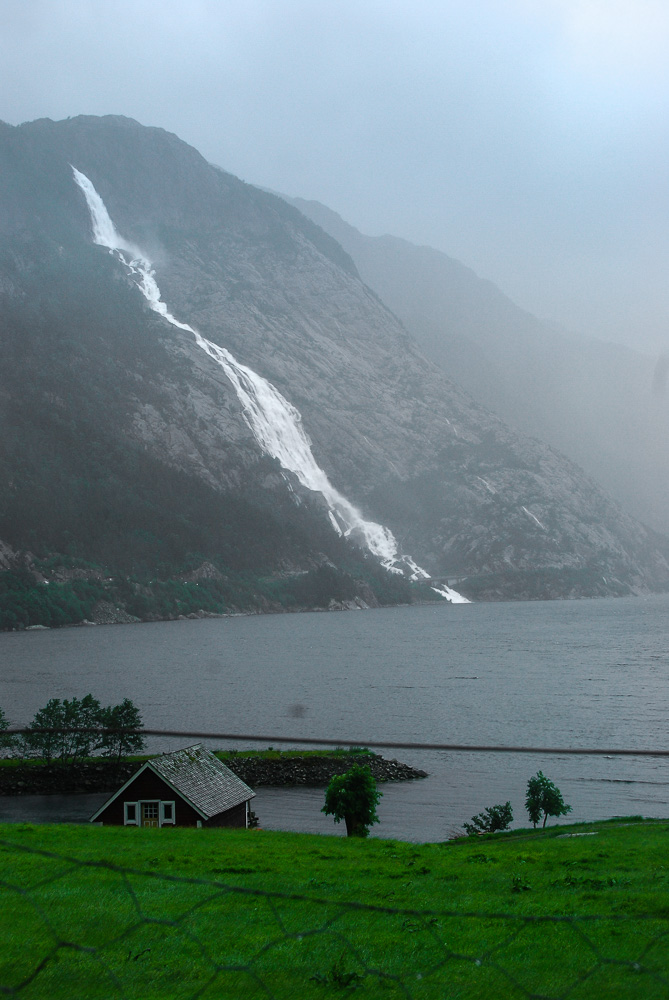

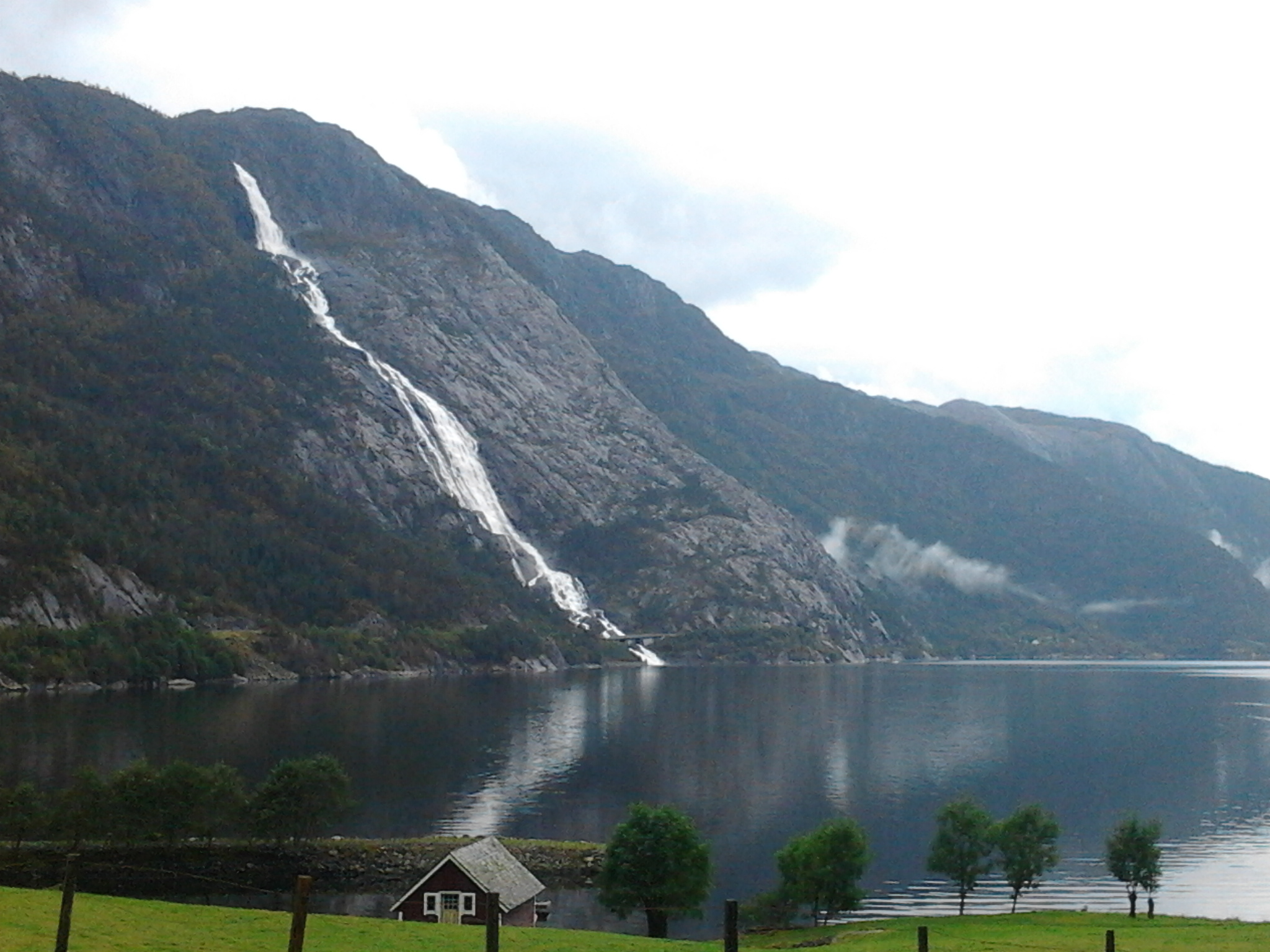

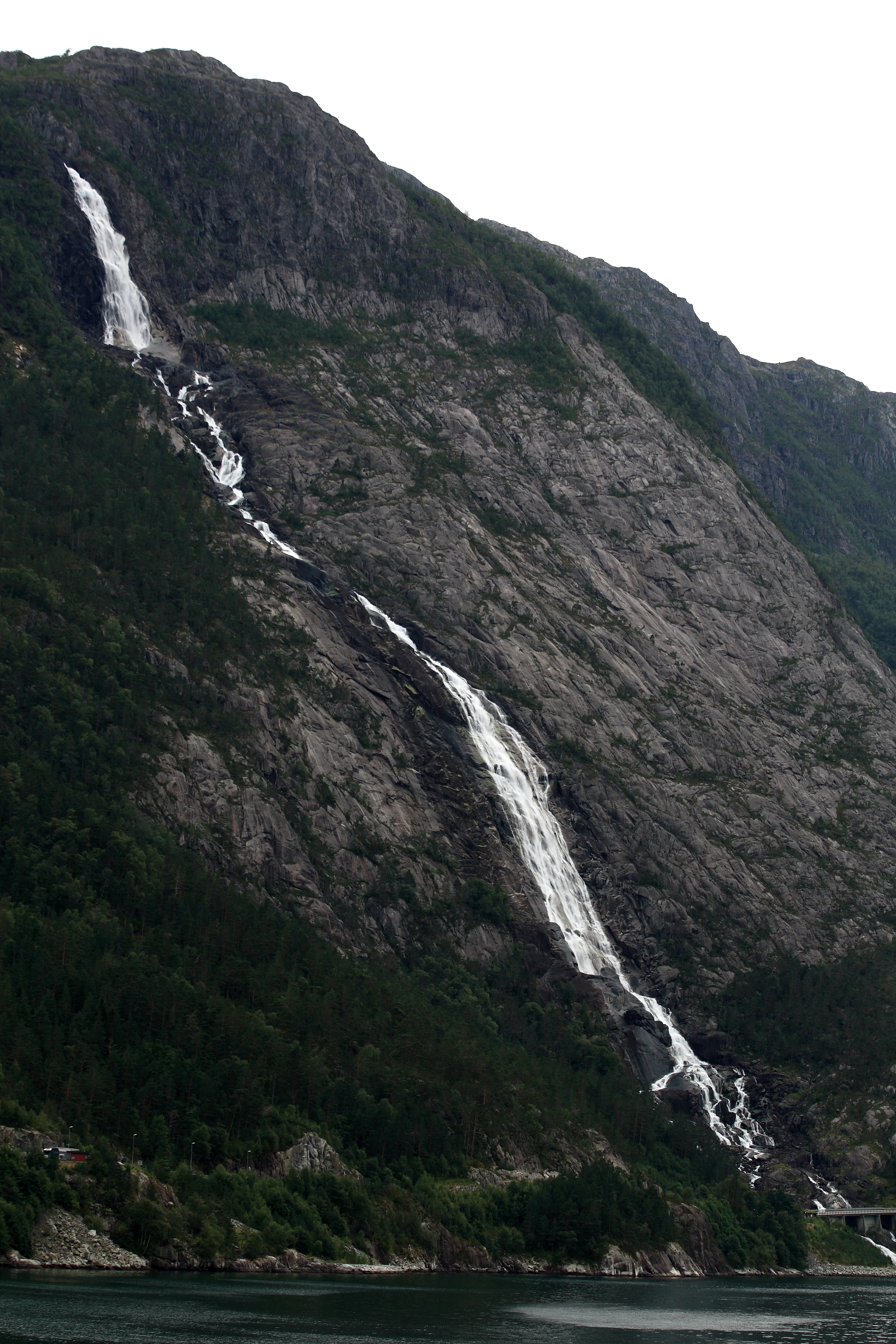

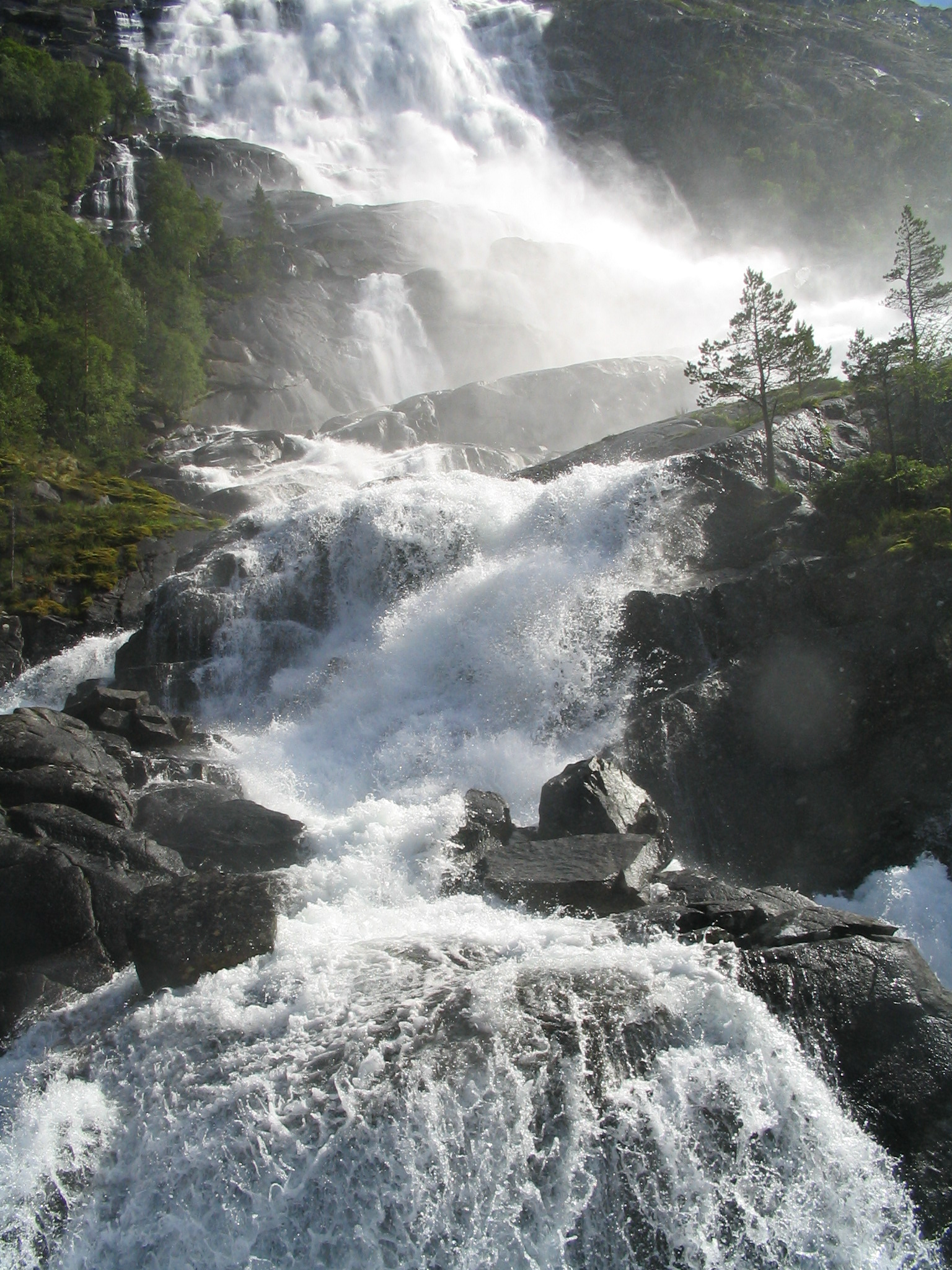

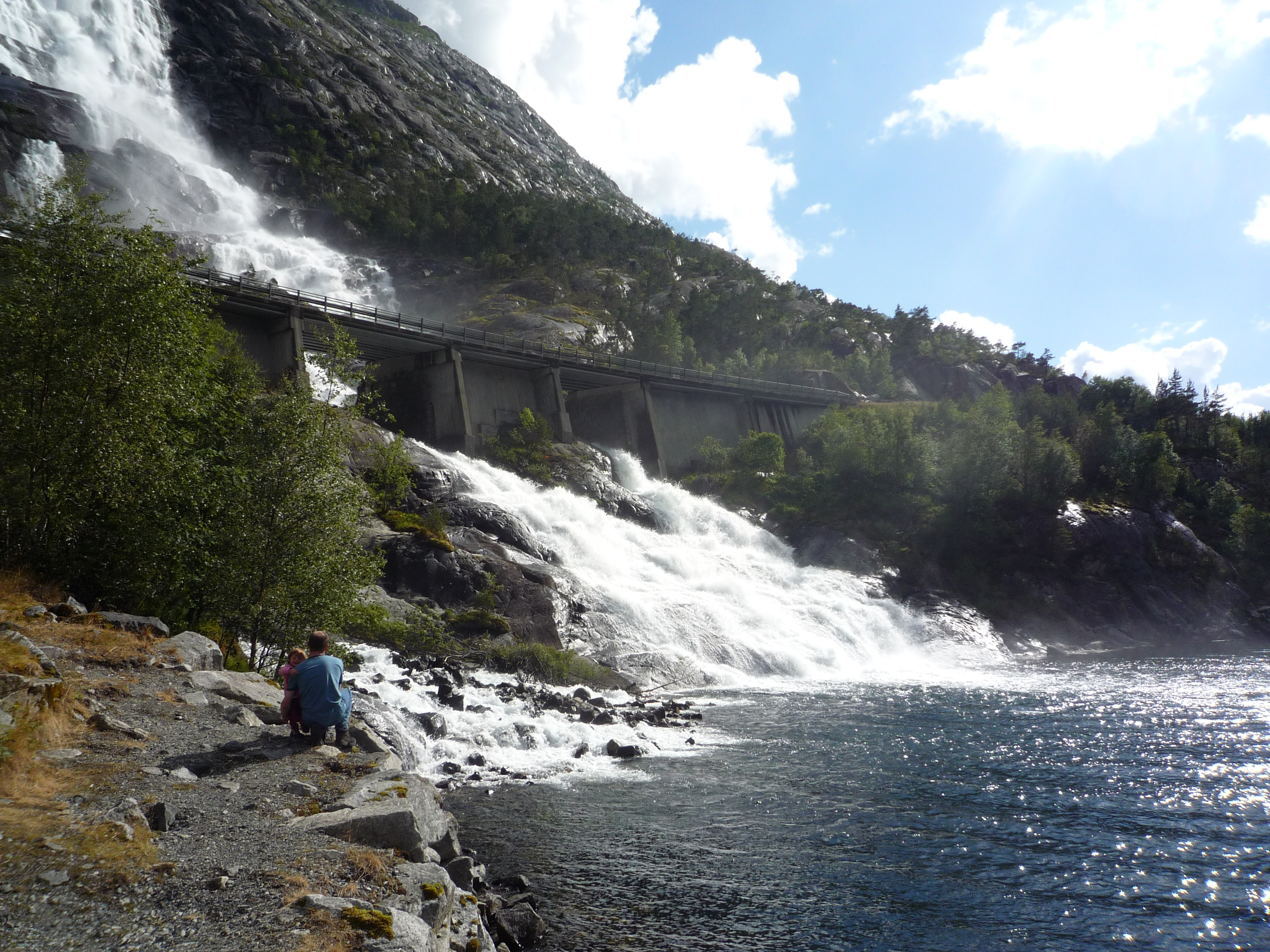

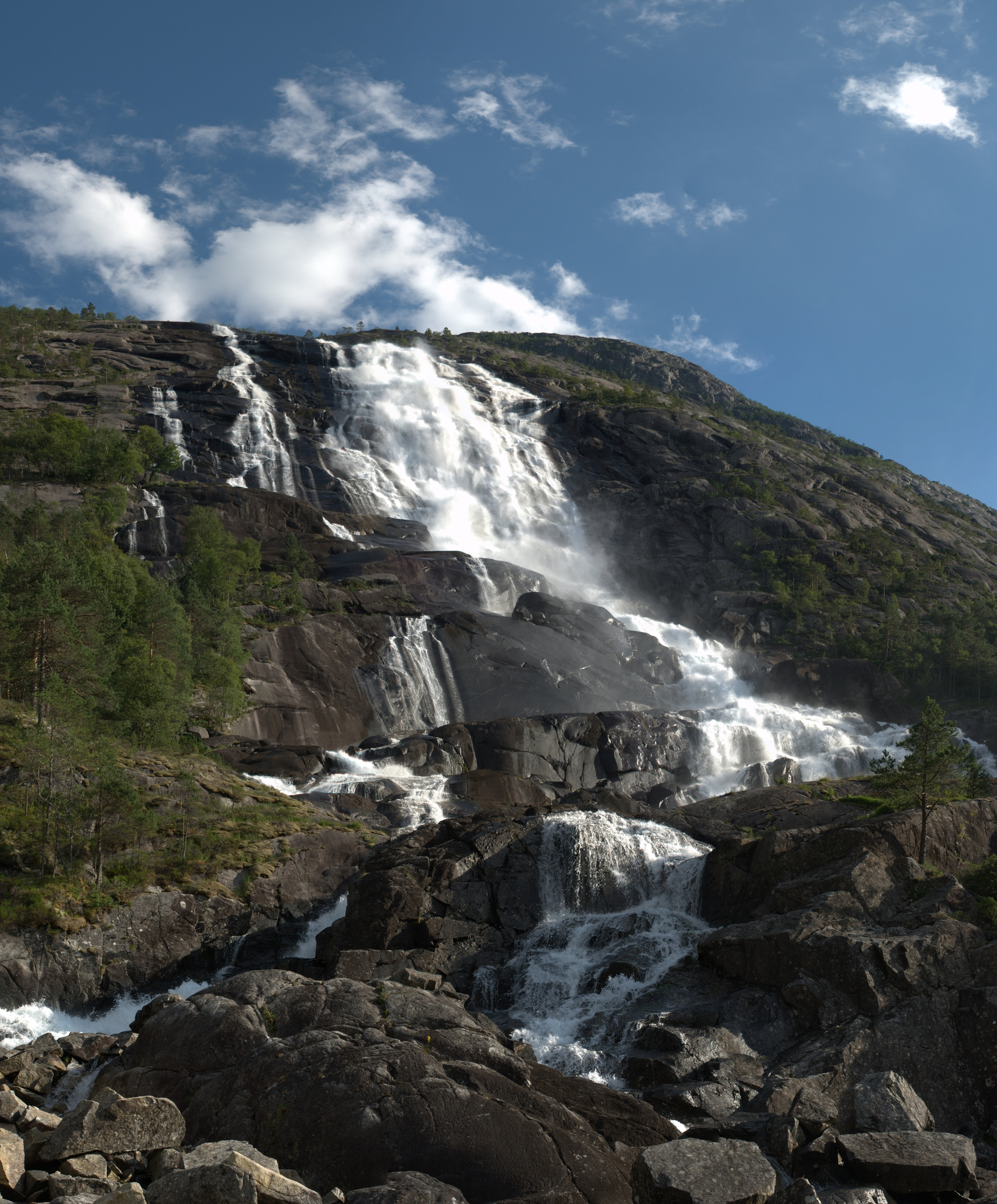

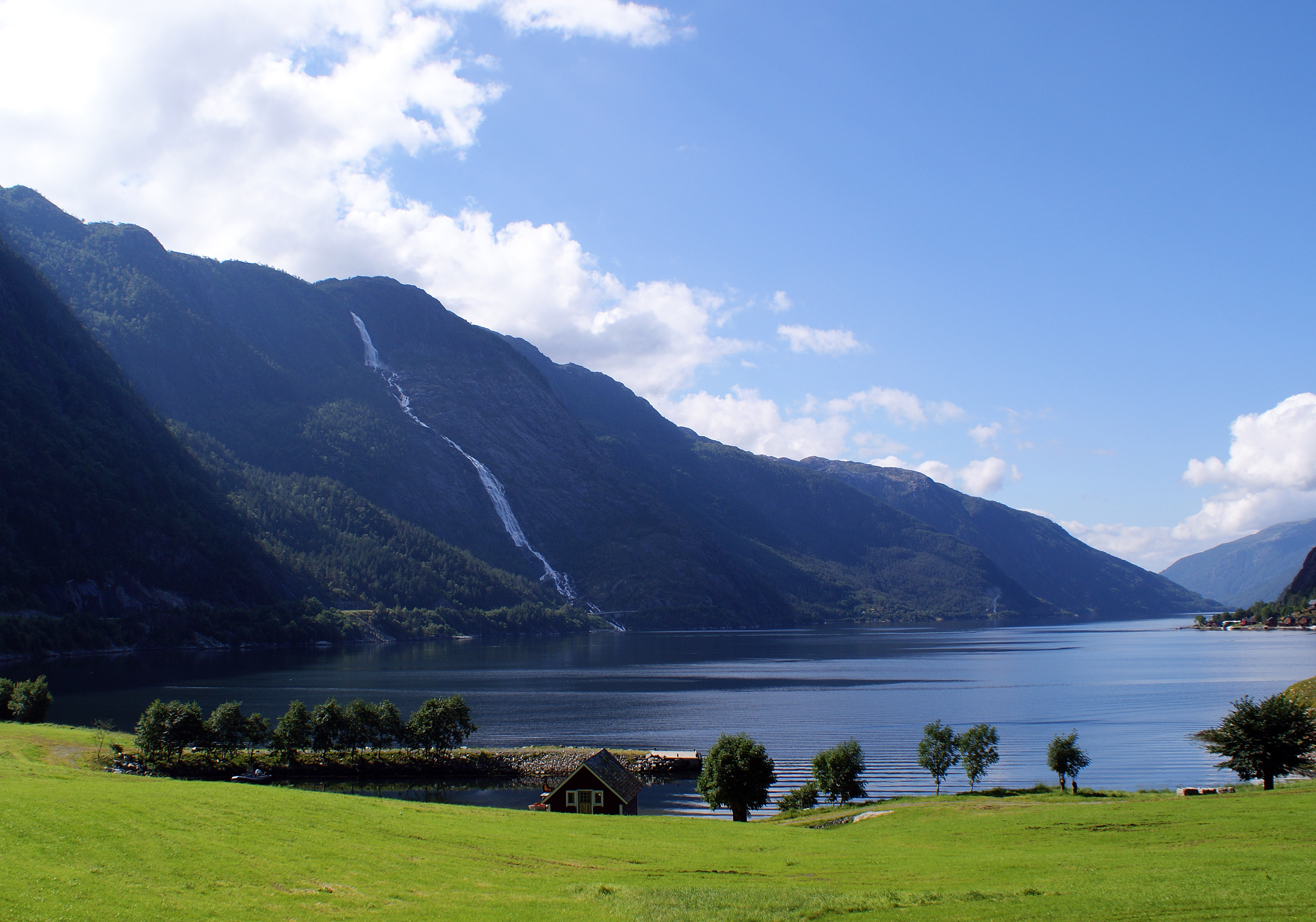

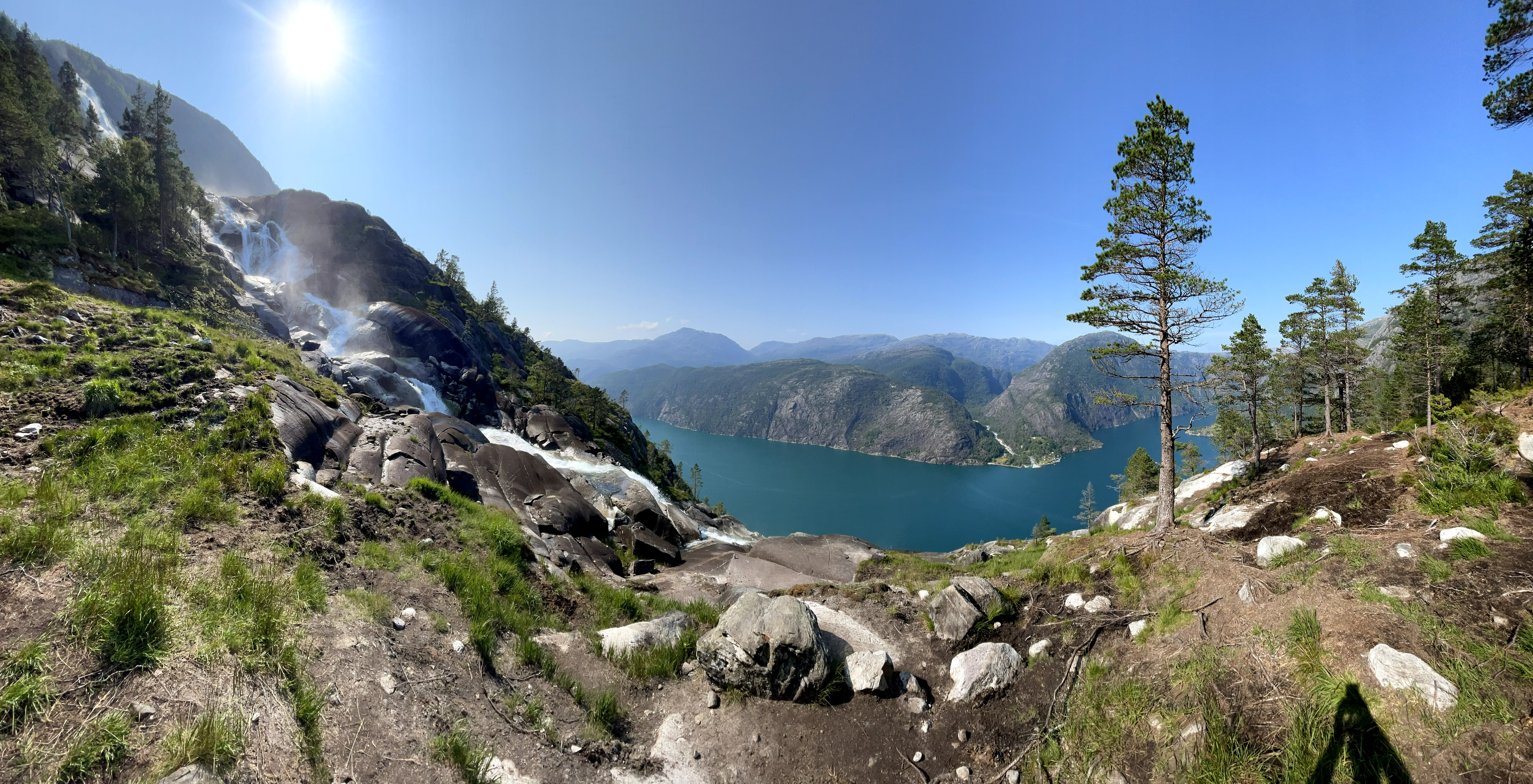

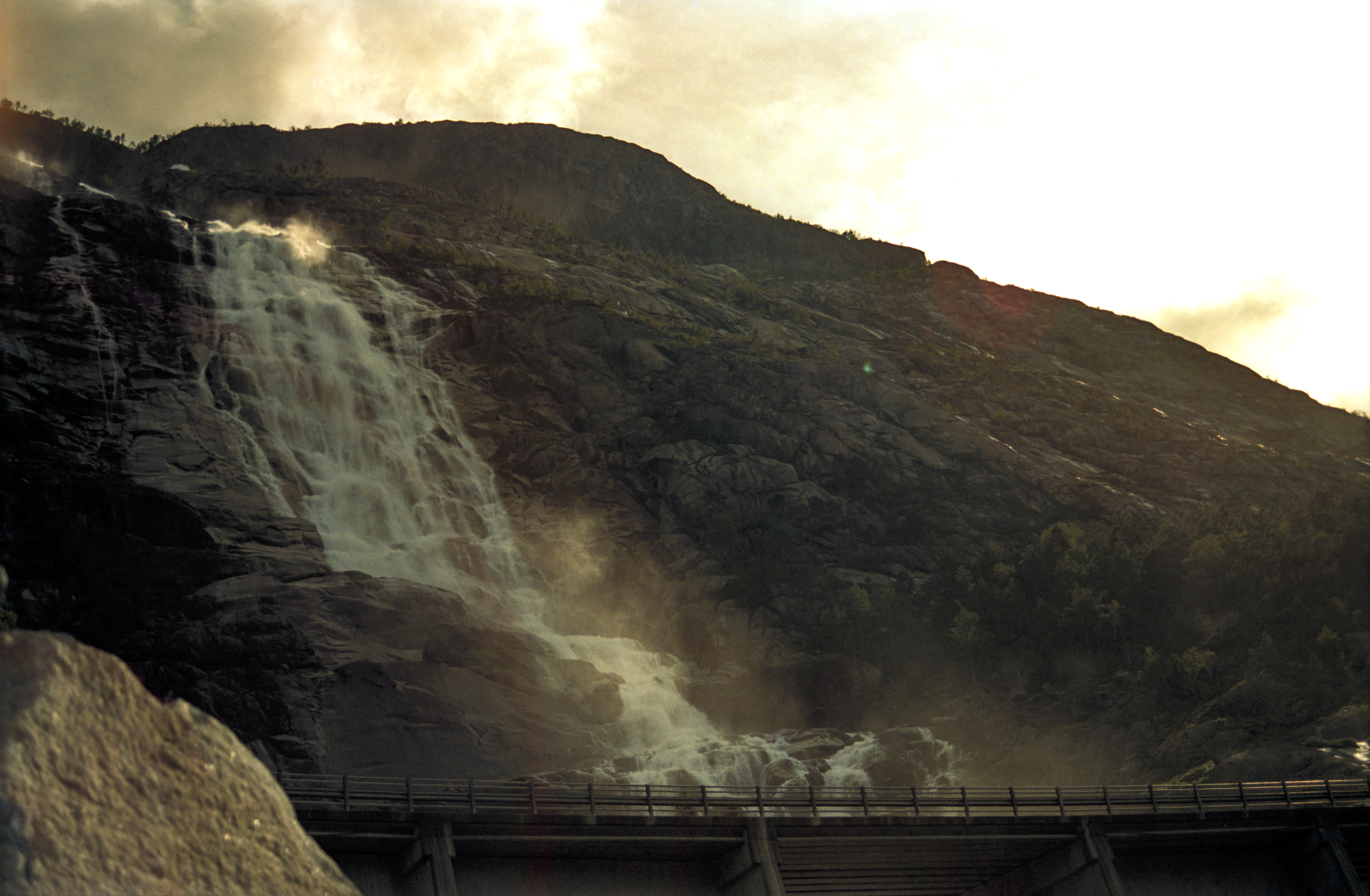

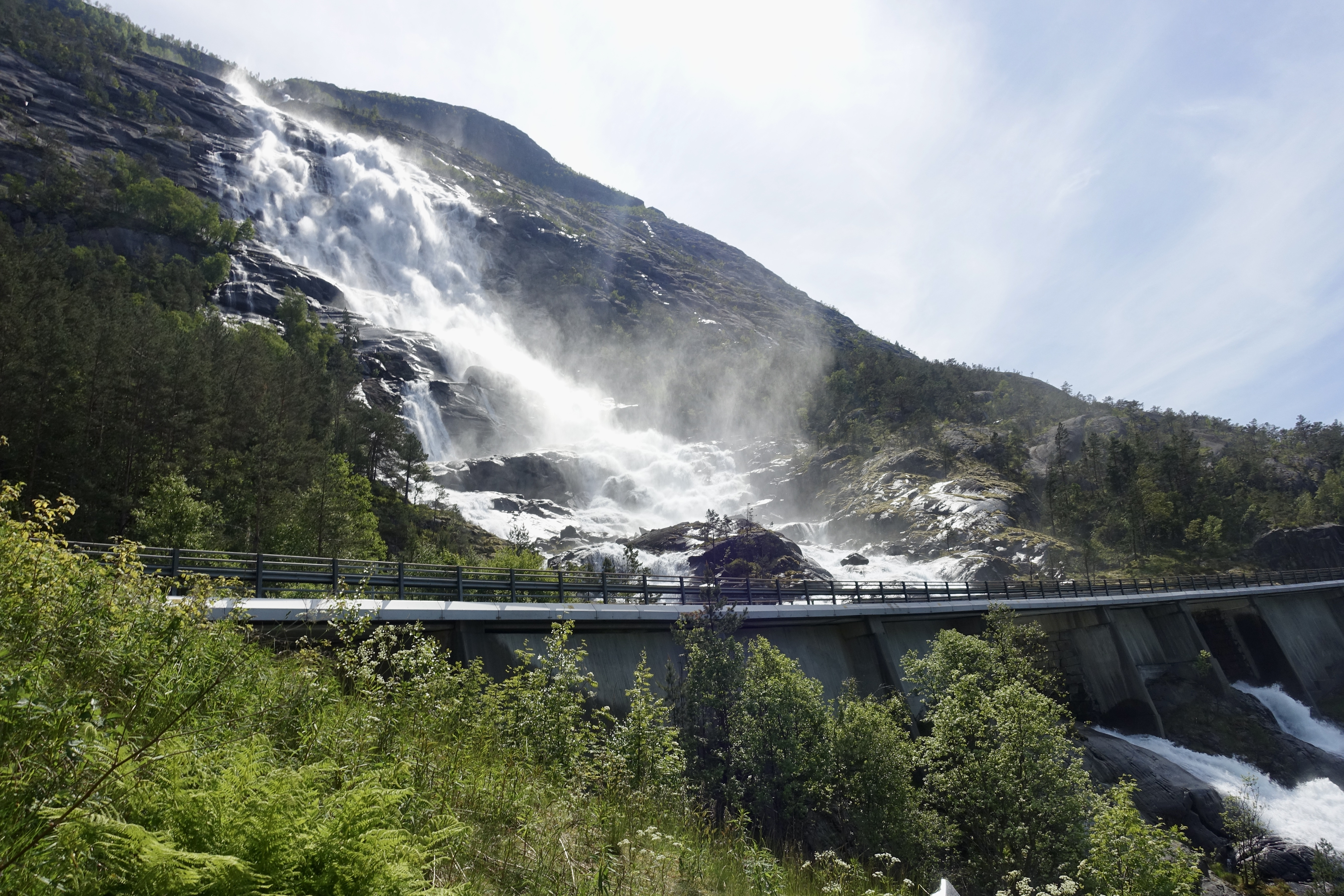

== See also ==
- List of waterfalls § Norway
