= European route E134 =

Road in trans-European E-road network

E134

Route information
- Length: 457 km (284 mi)

Major junctions
- West end: Karmøy
- East end: Vassum, Frogn

Location
- Countries: Norway

Highway system
- International E-road network; A Class; B Class

European route E134 (Norwegian: Europavei 134) is a European highway that crosses Norway starting at Haugesund Airport, Karmøy near the city of Haugesund on the west coast, heading over Haukeli, passing the city of Drammen, and ending in Vassum on the east side of the Oslofjord Tunnel.

With the highest point at 1,085 metres (3,560 ft) above sea level, the road is sensitive to snow conditions and foul weather during the winter season, during which the mountainous sections, especially near Haukelifjell skiing center, may be closed in short periods. The stretch of road through the mountains is called Haukelifjell.

== Route ==
=== Rogaland county ===
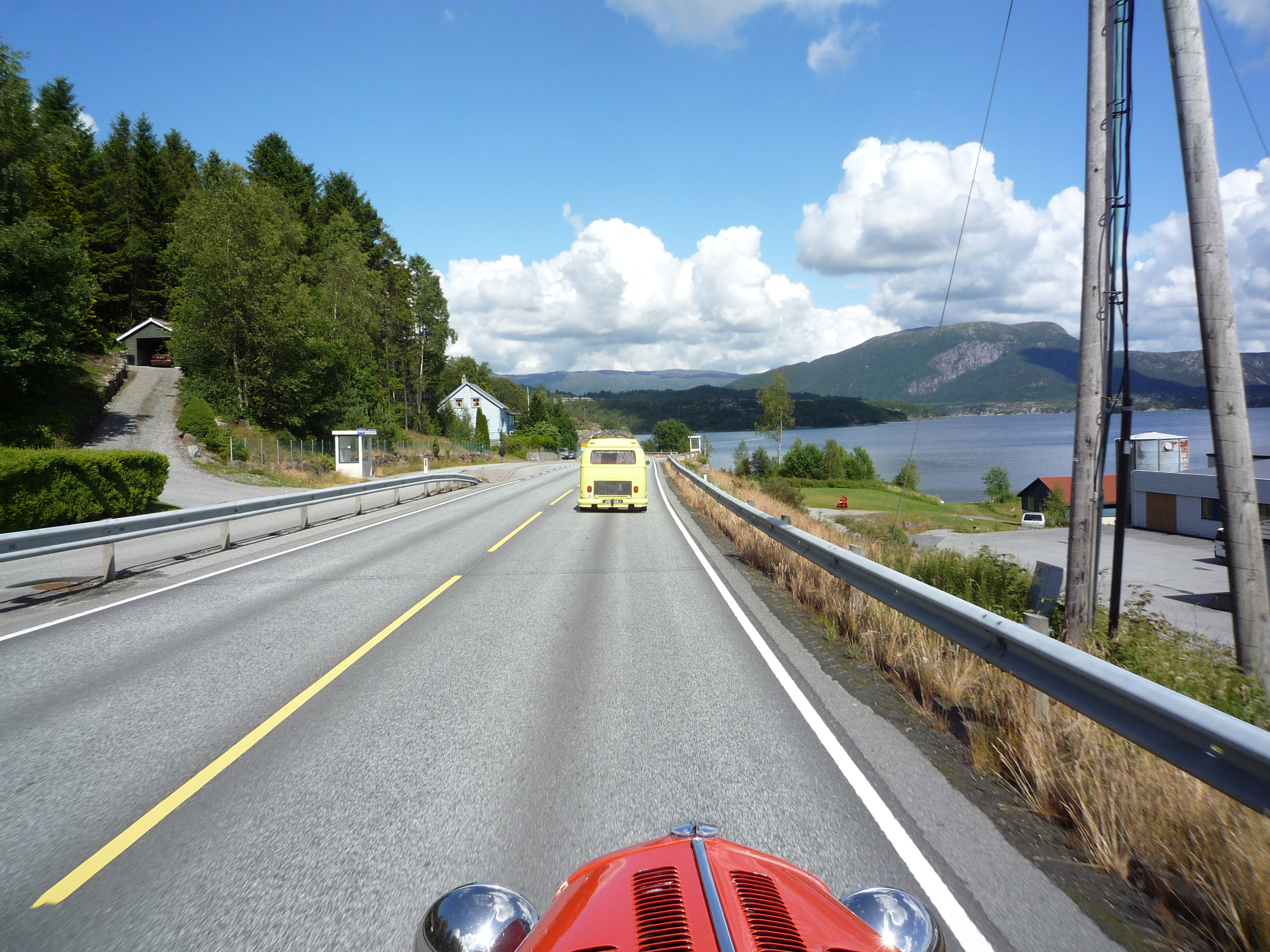
Road E134 at Skjold in Vindafjord Municipality

- Karmøy Municipality
  - Haugesund Airport
  - Karmsund Bridge
- Haugesund Municipality
- Karmøy Municipality
- Tysvær Municipality
  - Aksdal village
  - E39 south to Stavanger
  - The highways E39 and E134 run together for about 6 kilometres (3.7 mi)
  - E39 north to Bergen
- Vindafjord Municipality
  - Skjold village
    - A new road and tunnel was built around Skjold, opening in 2015
  - Ølensjøen village

=== Vestland county ===
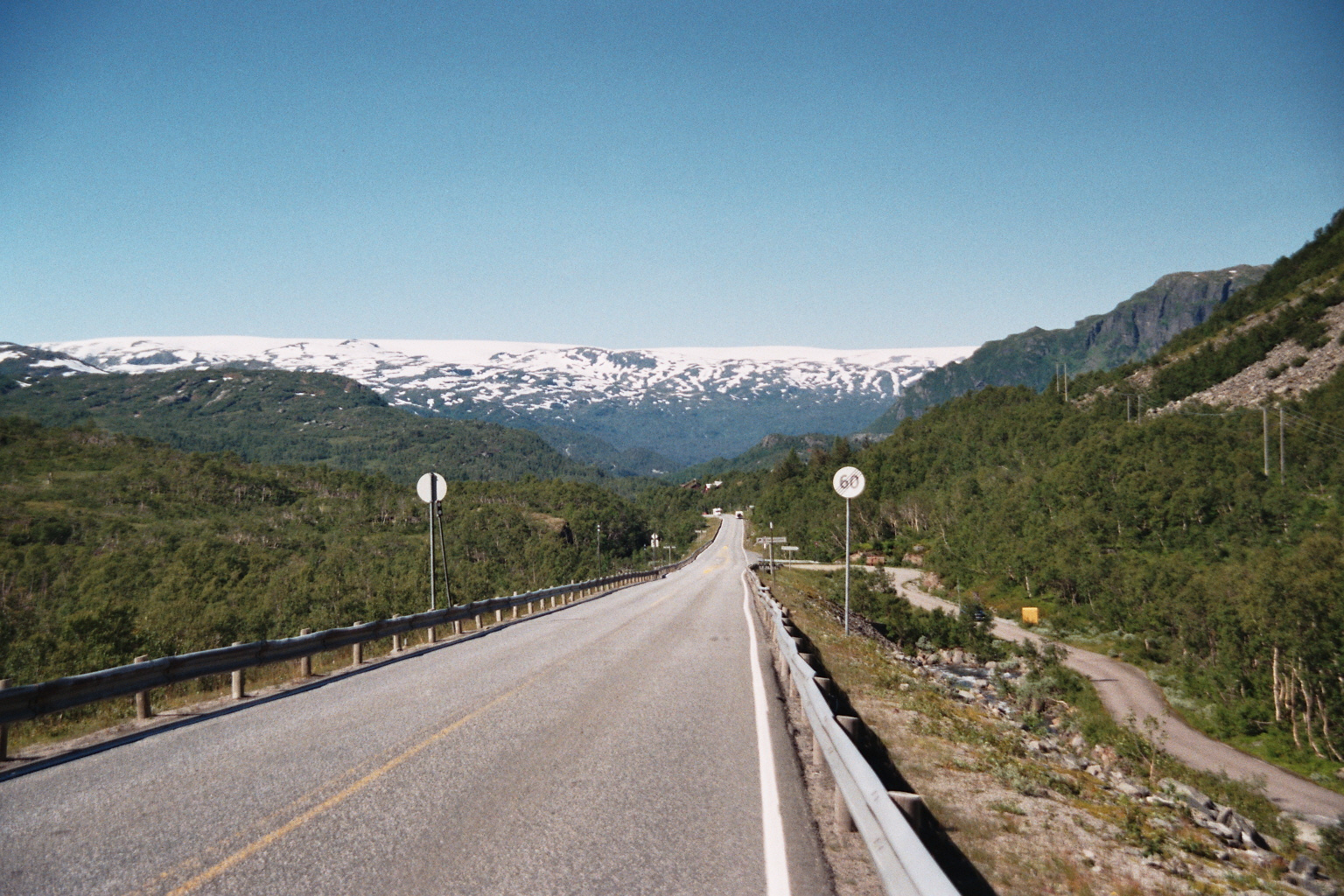
Folgefonna seen from E134, near Røldal

- Etne Municipality
  - Etnesjøen village
  - Åkrafjord Tunnel: 7,404 metres (24,291 ft)
  - Markhus Tunnel: 2,405 metres (7,890 ft)
  - Langfossen waterfall
  - Fjæra Tunnel: 1,518 metres (4,980 ft)
  - Rullestad Tunnel: 2,947 metres (9,669 ft)
- Ullensvang Municipality
  - Rv13 to Skare and Odda
  - Seljestad Tunnel: 1,272 metres (4,173 ft)
  - Røldal Tunnel: 4,657 metres (15,279 ft)
  - Horda Tunnel: 475 metres (1,558 ft)
  - Håra village
  - Røldal village
  - Austmannali Tunnel: 903 metres (2,963 ft)
  - Haukeli Tunnel: 5,682 metres (18,642 ft) - replaced the Old Dyrskartunnel
  - Haukelifjell

=== Telemark county ===
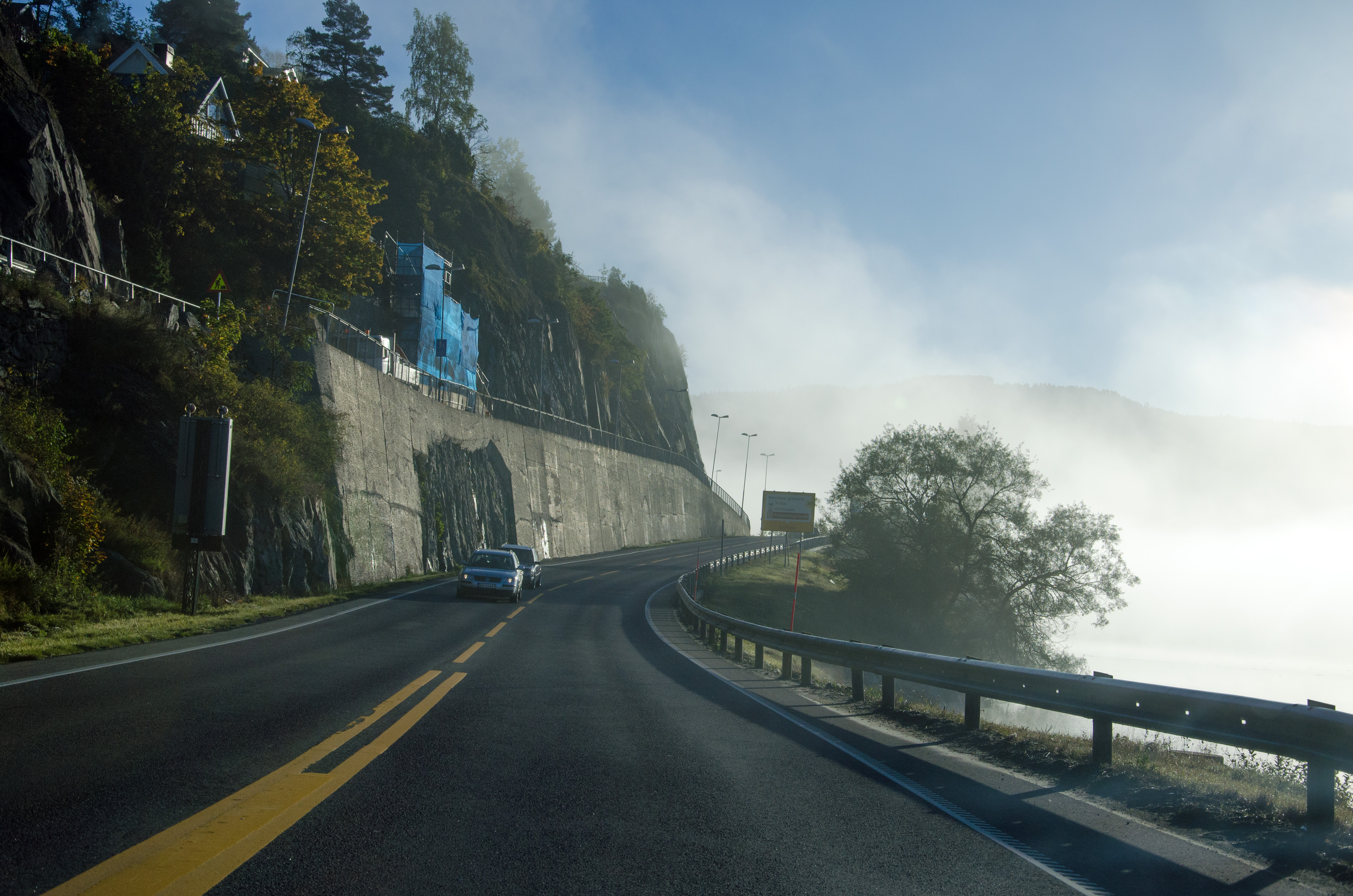
Road E134 to Notodden city, at Tuven

- Vinje Municipality
  - Vinje village
    - Vågslid Tunnel: 1,647 metres (5,404 ft)
    - Haukeli center
    - Rv9 to Setesdalen district
    - Åmot center
- Tokke Municipality
  - Høydalsmo village
- Kviteseid Municipality
  - Brunkeberg village
    - Rv41 to Kviteseid village
- Seljord Municipality
  - Seljord village
    - Rv36 to Bø i Telemark
  - Flatdal village
    - Mælefjell Tunnel: ↓ 9,500 metres (31,200 ft)
- Hjartdal Municipality
  - Hjartdal village
    - Mælefjell Tunnel: ↑ 9,500 metres (31,200 ft)
  - Sauland village
- Notodden Municipality
  - Heddal village
  - Notodden town

=== Buskerud county ===
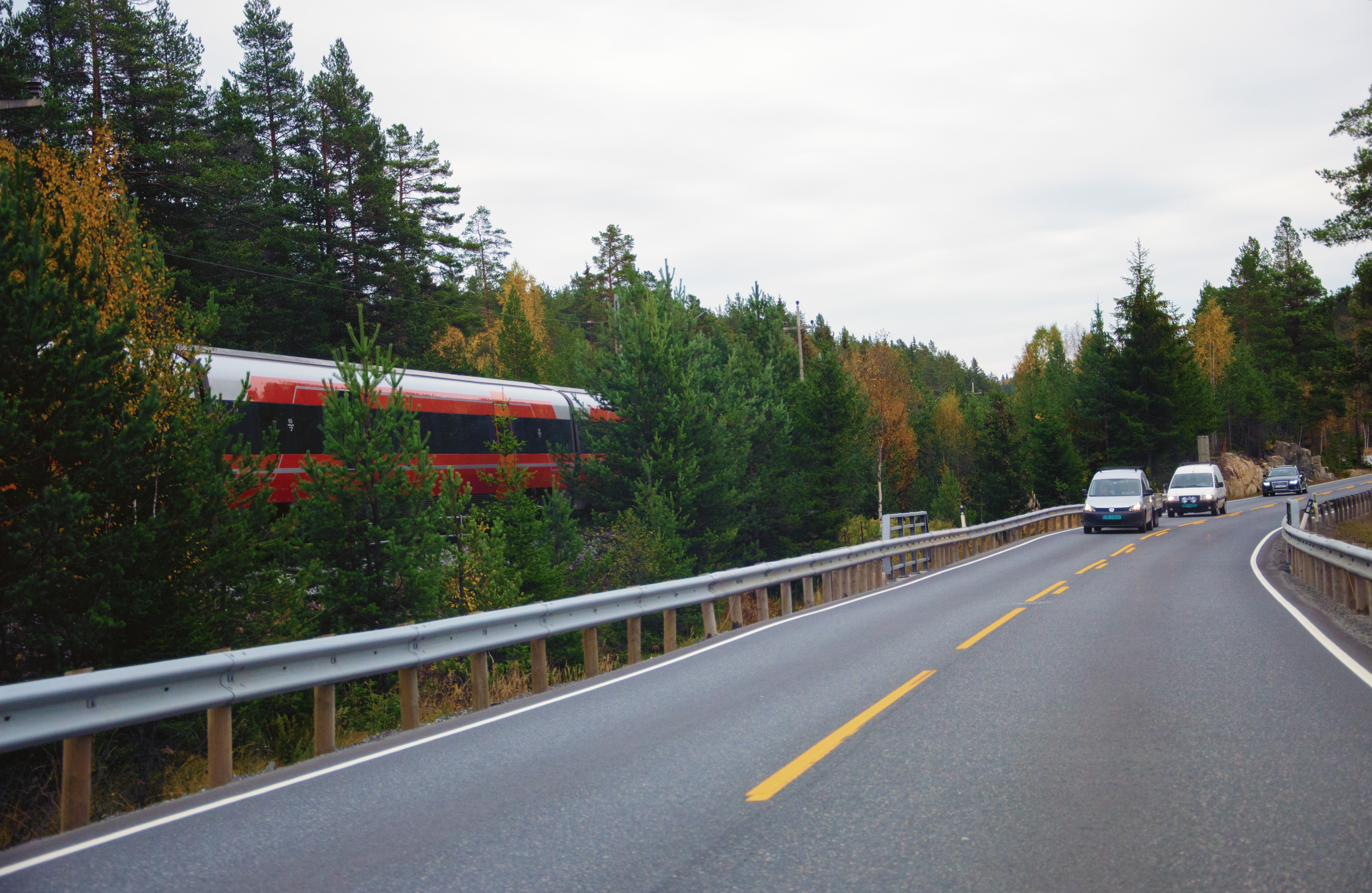
Road E134 at Meheia in Kongsberg

- Kongsberg Municipality
  - Kongsberg city
- Øvre Eiker Municipality
  - Hokksund town
- Drammen Municipality
  - Mjøndalen village
  - Strømsås Tunnel: 3,496 metres (11,470 ft)
  - Drammen city
    - E18
- Lier Municipality

=== Akershus county ===
- Asker Municipality
  - Elgskauås Tunnel: 2,630 metres (8,630 ft)
  - Oslofjord Tunnel: 7,273 metres (23,862 ft)
- Frogn Municipality
  - E6 (terminus of E134)

== History ==
A road over the mountain along this route was opened first time in 1889. In 1968, the Haukeli Tunnel (5.6 km (3.5 mi)) was opened allowing reliable wintertime traffic.

The road was numbered as European route E76 before 1992, when the numbering system of all of the European routes in the Nordic countries was revised. Initially, there was not room for it in the system, and road became called Norwegian National Road 11 (Riksvei 11). Due to local wishes and steadily increasing of the road standard during the 1990s, it again received European route status, with the number E134.

The route has many tunnels, especially in the mountainous sections in the central and western parts, especially along the Åkrafjorden, where is passes the Langfossen waterfall. Prior to the opening of the tunnels, some of the fjord sections of the road were quite steep and very narrow; around 5 metres (16 ft) wide. This was far less than the 8.5-metre (28 ft) minimum requirement for European routes, and well below the minimum requirement to allow two trucks to pass. During the 2010s, a new series of upgrades has been planned to further improve the road in the Seljord-Hjartdal area as well as in Vindafjord Municipality.

In 2011 E134 was extended by 10 kilometres (6.2 mi), to end at Haugesund Airport instead of near city centre. In 2018 E134 was extended by 40 kilometres (25 mi), to include the Oslofjord Tunnel, letting it end at Vassum at the European route E6 in Frogn Municipality in Eastern Norway. In 2019 the E134 was shortened by about 10 km by being routed through the newly opened Mælefjell Tunnel.

In 2026, a landslide blocked E134 at Fjæra, Etne, Vestland. Big rocks destroyed parked cars. Luckily no one was injured. E134 is blocked for some time. Alternative routes are narrow and at least 70 km longer.

== Places of interest ==
The highway runs near several places of interest:

- Heddal Stave Church
- Silvermine in Kongsberg Municipality
- Ski museum in Morgedal
- Old Hotel Haukeliseter
- Røldal Stave Church

== Road conditions ==
When driving along the road, one may see many of the following words on signs or road condition web sites:

- Haukelifjell = The main mountain pass on E 134, just south of the Hardangervidda mountain plateau
- Midlertidig stengt = Temporarily closed
- Kolonnekjøring = Driving in line after a snow plough truck only.
- Nattestengt = Closed by night
- Vegarbeid = Road work
- Kjøreforhold = Driving conditions
- Snø / snødekke = Snowy road
- Is / isdekke = Icy road
- Glatt = Slippery
- Bart = Bare road
- Vått = Wet road
- Fare for elg = Watch out for moose
