= Haukeli =

Village in Vinje Municipality, Norway

Haukeli Haukeligrend (historic)
- Village
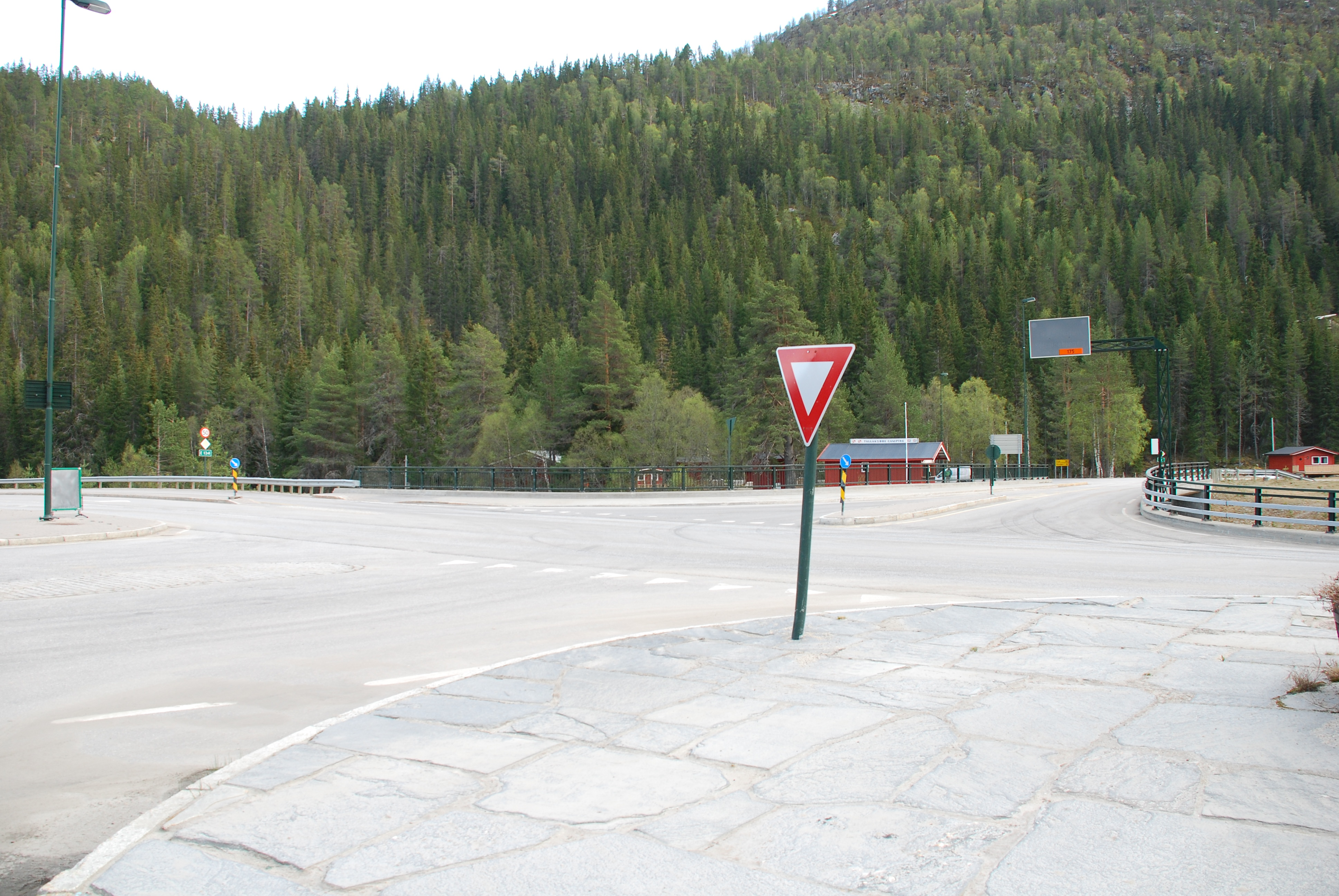
- View of the main road intersection in the village
- Interactive map of Haukeli
- Coordinates: 59.73482°N 7.55163°E
- Country: Norway
- Region: Eastern Norway
- County: Telemark
- District: Vest-Telemark
- Municipality: Vinje Municipality
- Elevation: 569 m (1,867 ft)
- Time zone: UTC+01:00 (CET)
  - Summer (DST): UTC+02:00 (CEST)
- Post Code: 3895 Edland

Haukeli (historically Haukeligrend) is a village in Vinje Municipality in Telemark county, Norway. The village is located up in the Haukelifjell mountains, just south of the Hardangervidda National Park and immediately west of the village of Edland. Haukeli is where Norwegian National Road 9 and European route E134 meet. It is the last larger village heading west before going over the mountain pass and entering Western Norway. In 2000, the village's name was officially changed from Haukeligrend to simply Haukeli.

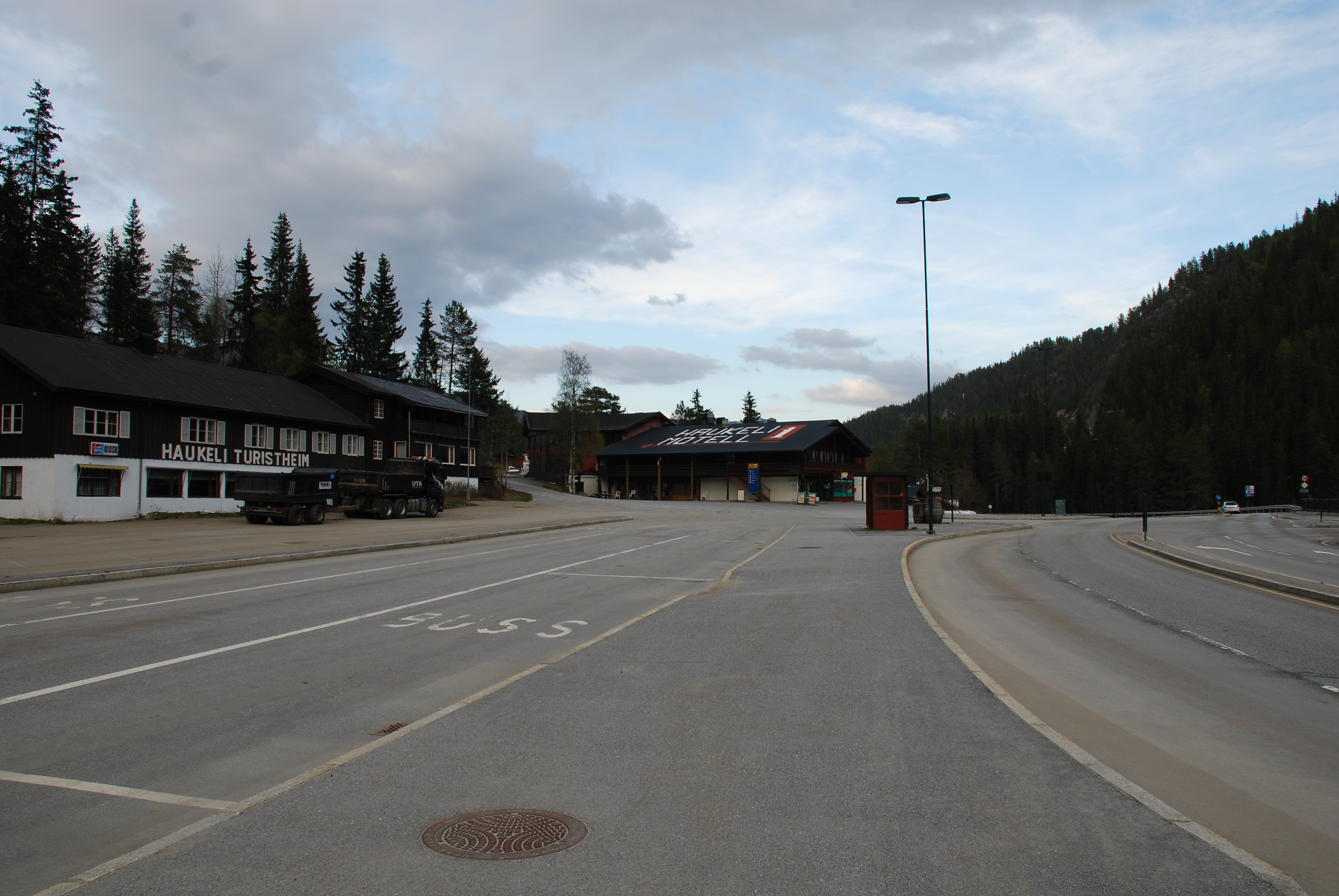
Haukeli hotell

Popular activities in the area are fishing, hunting, hiking, and skiing. Haukelifjell is located about 12 kilometres (7.5 mi) to the west of Haukeli, and it is a skiing destination in wintertime.

Some of the rivers around Haukeli have been dammed to produce hydropower. Development started in 1957 with the construction of the Haukeli Power Station and was finished in 1979 when the system was all completed.
