= Haukeli Tunnel =

Road tunnel in Norway

Haukeli Tunnel Haukelitunnelen
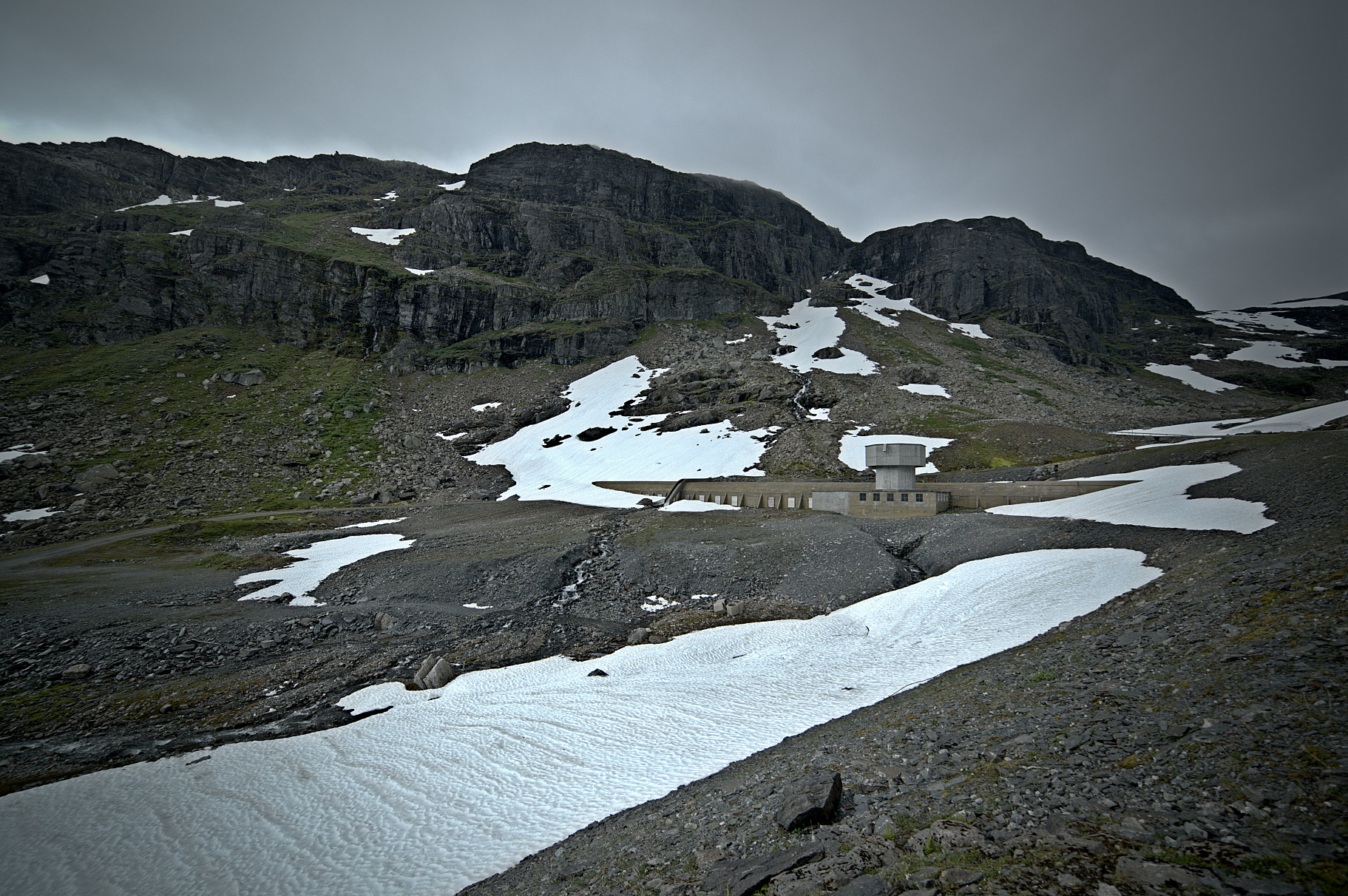
- View of the tunnel that briefly comes out of the mountain, but stays contained in concrete
- Interactive map of Haukeli Tunnel; Haukelitunnelen

Overview
- Location: Vestland, Norway
- Coordinates: 59.8421°N 7.0370°E
- Status: In use
- Route: E134

Operation
- Opened: 1968

Technical
- Length: 5,682 metres (18,642 ft)
- Max elevation: 1,085 metres (3,560 ft)
- Tunnel clearance: 4.2 metres (14 ft)

The Haukeli Tunnel (Norwegian: Haukelitunnelen) is a road tunnel in Ullensvang Municipality in Vestland county, Norway. The 5,682-metre (3.531 mi) tunnel is located about 10 kilometres (6.2 mi) northeast of the village of Røldal. This tunnel was the longest tunnel in Norway from 1968 until the Høyanger Tunnel was opened in 1982. In 2007, the tunnel was renovated and the interior height was increased to 4.2 metres (14 ft) throughout the tunnel.

The tunnel is part of the European route E134 highway, and this tunnel was built in 1968 to replace an older exposed road that was often impassable in the wintertime. The tunnel goes through two different mountains, and there is actually a 150-metre (490 ft) long section of the tunnel that is not inside the mountains. This section goes between the two mountains at Dyrskar and it is encased in concrete with a ventilation tower attached. Dyrskar was a challenging place to pass when the road went there. The old road is still drivable during the summer months. At Dyrskar, one can also see one of the oldest tunnels in Norway: the Old Dyrskartunnel which was in use from 1900–1919. The old tunnel is located on the hillside west of the pass.
