= Vozdvizhenye, Ivanovo Oblast =

Vozdvizhenye Воздвиженье
- Selo
- Location within Ivanovo Oblast Location within Russia
- Coordinates: 57°29′N 42°00′E
- Country: Russia
- Region: Ivanovo Oblast
- District: Zavolzhsky District
- Time zone: UTC+3:00

Vozdvizhenye (Russian: Воздвиженье) is a rural locality (a selo) in Zavolzhsky District, Ivanovo Oblast, Russia. Population: 350 (2010 census); 381 (2002 census);

== Geography ==
This rural locality is located 7 km from Zavolzhsk (the district's administrative centre), 84 km from Ivanovo (capital of Ivanovo Oblast) and 327 km from Moscow. Rybolovka is the nearest rural locality.
