= Dolmatovsky, Ivanovo Oblast =

Dolmatovsky Долматовский
- Selo
- Location within Ivanovo Oblast Location within Russia
- Coordinates: 57°29′N 42°19′E
- Country: Russia
- Region: Ivanovo Oblast
- District: Zavolzhsky District
- Time zone: UTC+3:00

Dolmatovsky (Russian: Долматовский) is a rural locality (a selo) in Zavolzhsky District, Ivanovo Oblast, Russia. Population: 369 (2010 census); 438 (2002 census);

== Geography ==
This rural locality is located 12 km from Zavolzhsk (the district's administrative centre), 99 km from Ivanovo (capital of Ivanovo Oblast) and 342 km from Moscow. Ovsyanitsy is the nearest rural locality.
