= Voronino, Zavolzhsky District, Ivanovo Oblast =

Voronino Воронино
- Village
- Location within Ivanovo Oblast Location within Russia
- Coordinates: 57°25′N 41°39′E
- Country: Russia
- Region: Ivanovo Oblast
- District: Zavolzhsky District
- Time zone: UTC+3:00

Voronino (Russian: Воронино) is a rural locality (a village) in Zavolzhsky District, Ivanovo Oblast, Russia. Population: 9 (2010 census);

== Geography ==
This rural locality is located 29 km from Zavolzhsk (the district's administrative centre), 64 km from Ivanovo (capital of Ivanovo Oblast) and 305 km from Moscow. Fominskoye is the nearest rural locality.
