= Krapivki =

Krapivki Крапивки
- Village
- Location within Ivanovo Oblast Location within Russia
- Coordinates: 57°34′N 41°45′E
- Country: Russia
- Region: Ivanovo Oblast
- District: Zavolzhsky District
- Time zone: UTC+3:00

Krapivki (Russian: Крапивки) is a rural locality (a village) in Zavolzhsky District, Ivanovo Oblast, Russia. Population: 70 (2010 census);

== Geography ==
This rural locality is located 24 km from Zavolzhsk (the district's administrative centre), 81 km from Ivanovo (capital of Ivanovo Oblast) and 320 km from Moscow. Belonogovo is the nearest rural locality.
