= Trostnikovo =

Trostnikovo Тростниково
- Village
- Location within Ivanovo Oblast Location within Russia
- Coordinates: 57°30′N 42°02′E
- Country: Russia
- Region: Ivanovo Oblast
- District: Zavolzhsky District
- Time zone: UTC+3:00

Trostnikovo (Russian: Тростниково) is a rural locality (a village) in Zavolzhsky District, Ivanovo Oblast, Russia. Population: 14 (2010 census);

== Geography ==
This rural locality is located 6 km from Zavolzhsk (the district's administrative centre), 86 km from Ivanovo (capital of Ivanovo Oblast) and 328 km from Moscow. Boristsevo is the nearest rural locality.
