= Kolshevo =

Kolshevo Колшево
- Selo
- Location within Ivanovo Oblast Location within Russia
- Coordinates: 57°40′N 41°39′E
- Country: Russia
- Region: Ivanovo Oblast
- District: Zavolzhsky District
- Time zone: UTC+3:00

Kolshevo (Russian: Колшево) is a rural locality (a selo) in Zavolzhsky District, Ivanovo Oblast, Russia. Population: 453 (2010 census); 497 (2002 census);

== Geography ==
This rural locality is located 35 km from Zavolzhsk (the district's administrative centre), 87 km from Ivanovo (capital of Ivanovo Oblast) and 321 km from Moscow. Seliverstovo is the nearest rural locality.
