= Golochelovo =

Golochelovo Голочелово
- Village
- Location within Ivanovo Oblast Location within Russia
- Coordinates: 57°37′N 41°51′E
- Country: Russia
- Region: Ivanovo Oblast
- District: Zavolzhsky District
- Time zone: UTC+3:00

Golochelovo (Russian: Голочелово) is a rural locality (a village) in Zavolzhsky District, Ivanovo Oblast, Russia. Population: 8 (2010 census);

== Geography ==
This rural locality is located 22 km from Zavolzhsk (the district's administrative centre), 87 km from Ivanovo (capital of Ivanovo Oblast) and 327 km from Moscow. Kistega is the nearest rural locality.
