= Novaya Derevnya, Ivanovo Oblast =

Novaya Derevnya Новая Деревня
- Village
- Location within Ivanovo Oblast Location within Russia
- Coordinates: 57°31′N 41°48′E
- Country: Russia
- Region: Ivanovo Oblast
- District: Zavolzhsky District
- Time zone: UTC+3:00

Novaya Derevnya (Russian: Новая Деревня) is a rural locality (a village) in Zavolzhsky District, Ivanovo Oblast, Russia. Population: 48 (2010 census); 65 (2002 census);

== Geography ==
This rural locality is located 20 km from Zavolzhsk (the district's administrative centre), 78 km from Ivanovo (capital of Ivanovo Oblast) and 319 km from Moscow. Yesiplevo is the nearest rural locality.
