= Nikola-Mera =

Nikola-Mera Никола-Мера
- Selo
- Location within Ivanovo Oblast Location within Russia
- Coordinates: 57°28′N 42°19′E
- Country: Russia
- Region: Ivanovo Oblast
- District: Zavolzhsky District
- Time zone: UTC+3:00

Nikola-Mera (Russian: Никола-Мера) is a rural locality (a selo) in Zavolzhsky District, Ivanovo Oblast, Russia. Population: 6 (2010 census); 13 (2002 census);

== Geography ==
This rural locality is located 11 km from Zavolzhsk (the district's administrative centre), 97 km from Ivanovo (capital of Ivanovo Oblast) and 340 km from Moscow. Zuyevo is the nearest rural locality.
