= Posulovo =

Posulovo Посулово
- Village
- Location within Ivanovo Oblast Location within Russia
- Coordinates: 57°34′N 41°56′E
- Country: Russia
- Region: Ivanovo Oblast
- District: Zavolzhsky District
- Time zone: UTC+3:00

Posulovo (Russian: Посулово) is a rural locality (a village) in Zavolzhsky District, Ivanovo Oblast, Russia. Population: 12 (2010 census);

== Geography ==
This rural locality is located 15 km from Zavolzhsk (the district's administrative centre), 86 km from Ivanovo (capital of Ivanovo Oblast) and 327 km from Moscow. Stepanki is the nearest rural locality.
