= Cheganovo =

Cheganovo Чеганово
- Village
- Location within Ivanovo Oblast Location within Russia
- Coordinates: 57°28′N 42°15′E
- Country: Russia
- Region: Ivanovo Oblast
- District: Zavolzhsky District
- Time zone: UTC+3:00

Cheganovo (Russian: Чеганово) is a rural locality (a village) in Zavolzhsky District, Ivanovo Oblast, Russia. Population: 28 (2010 census);

== Geography ==
This rural locality is located 7 km from Zavolzhsk (the district's administrative centre), 93 km from Ivanovo (capital of Ivanovo Oblast) and 336 km from Moscow. Martynikha is the nearest rural locality.
