= Khotenovo =

Khotenovo Хотеново
- Village
- Location within Ivanovo Oblast Location within Russia
- Coordinates: 57°28′N 41°55′E
- Country: Russia
- Region: Ivanovo Oblast
- District: Zavolzhsky District
- Time zone: UTC+3:00

Khotenovo (Russian: Хотеново) is a rural locality (a village) in Zavolzhsky District, Ivanovo Oblast, Russia. Population: 9 (2010 census);

== Geography ==
This rural locality is located 13 km from Zavolzhsk (the district's administrative centre), 79 km from Ivanovo (capital of Ivanovo Oblast) and 321 km from Moscow. Ilyinskoye is the nearest rural locality.
