= Babtsyno, Zavolzhsky District, Ivanovo Oblast =

Babtsyno Бабцыно
- Village
- Location within Ivanovo Oblast Location within Russia
- Coordinates: 57°28′N 41°37′E
- Country: Russia
- Region: Ivanovo Oblast
- District: Zavolzhsky District
- Time zone: UTC+3:00

Babtsyno (Russian: Бабцыно) is a rural locality (a village) in Zavolzhsky District, Ivanovo Oblast, Russia. Population: 11 (2010 census);

== Geography ==
This rural locality is located 31 km from Zavolzhsk (the district's administrative centre), 66 km from Ivanovo (capital of Ivanovo Oblast) and 306 km from Moscow. Zabolotye is the nearest rural locality.
