= Bredikhino =

Bredikhino Бредихино
- Selo
- Location within Ivanovo Oblast Location within Russia
- Coordinates: 57°28′N 42°09′E
- Country: Russia
- Region: Ivanovo Oblast
- District: Zavolzhsky District
- Time zone: UTC+3:00

Bredikhino (Russian: Бредихино) is a rural locality (a selo) in Zavolzhsky District, Ivanovo Oblast, Russia. Population: 131 (2010 census);

== Geography ==
This rural locality is located 2 km from Zavolzhsk (the district's administrative centre), 89 km from Ivanovo (capital of Ivanovo Oblast) and 332 km from Moscow. Mikhaylovskaya is the nearest rural locality.
