= Bridge to nowhere =

Type of unfinished bridge

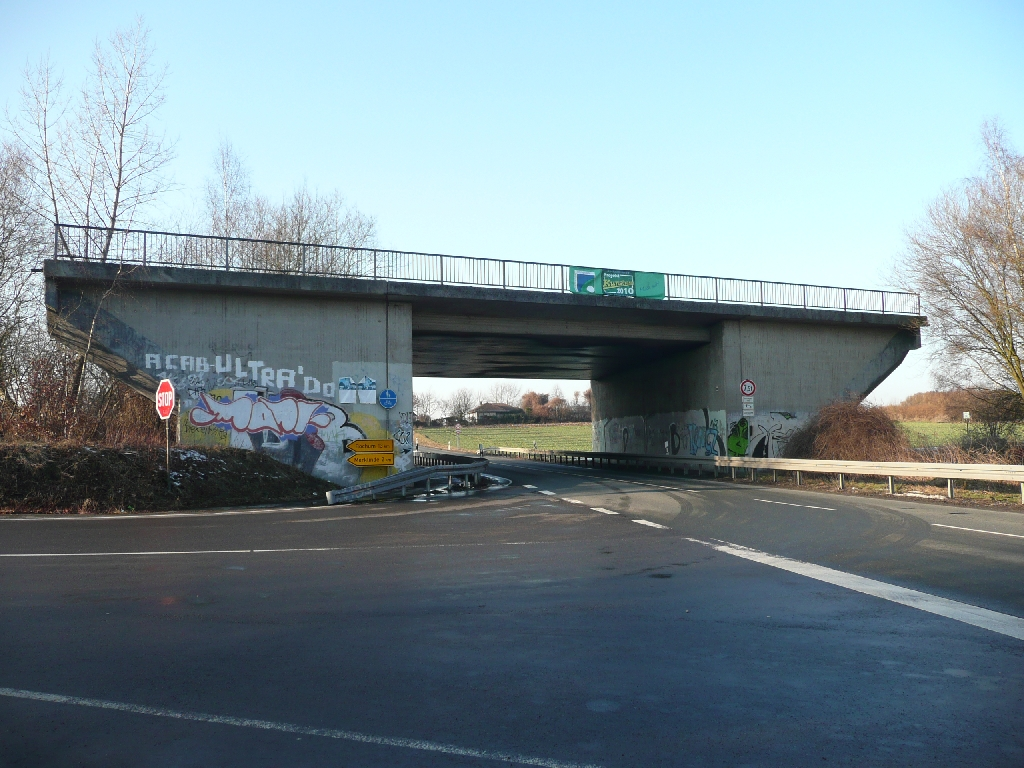
This highway bridge near Castrop-Rauxel, Germany, was built in 1978 but not connected on either end.

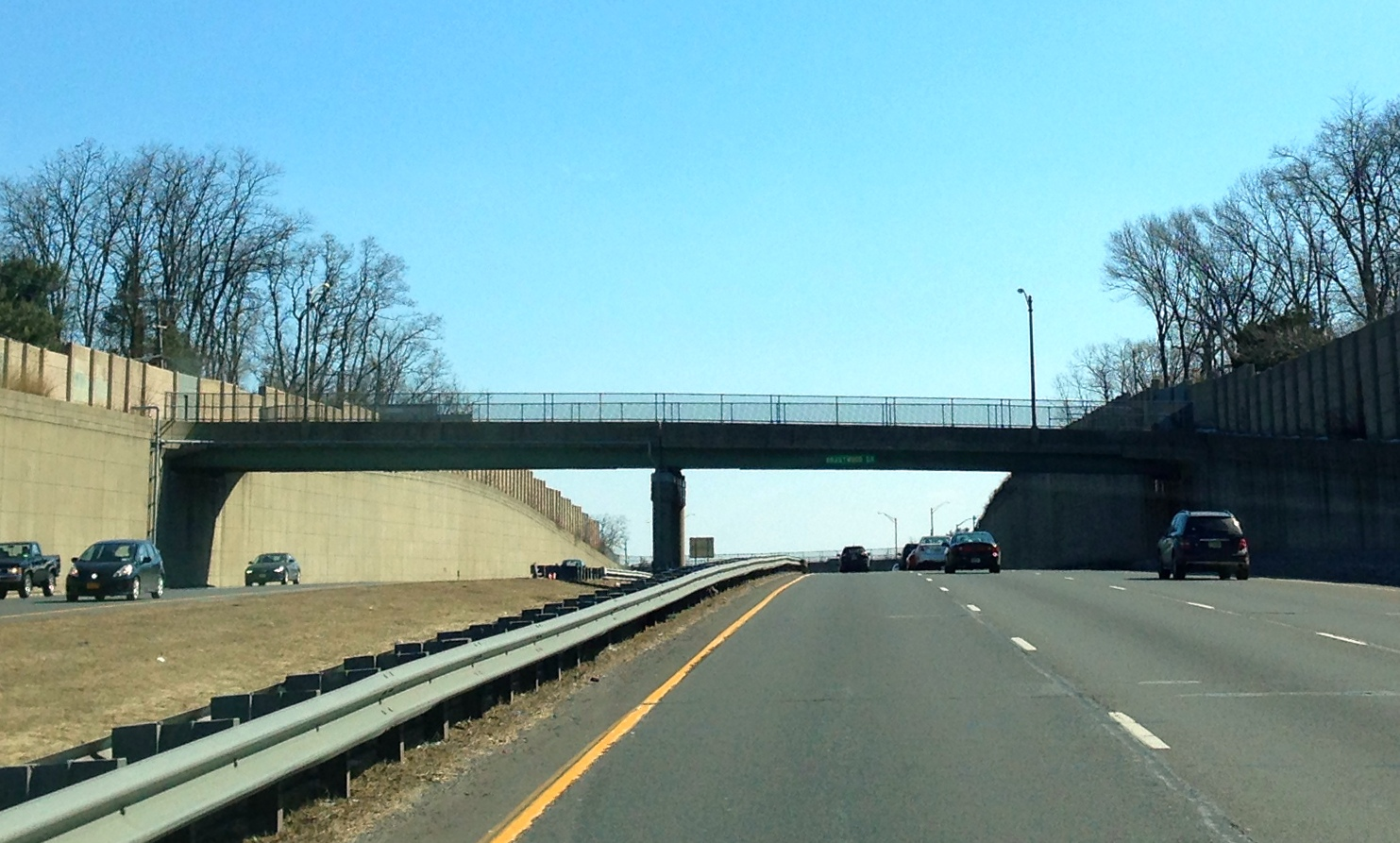
An overpass to nowhere in Summit, New Jersey: Brantwood Terrace Overpass, walled off on both ends

A bridge to nowhere is a bridge where one or both ends are broken, incomplete, or unconnected to any roads. If it is an overpass or an interchange, the term overpass to nowhere or interchange to nowhere may be used respectively.

== Origins ==
There are five main origins for these bridges:

- The bridge was never completed for reasons such as cost or disputed property rights.
- One or both of the bridge's ends have collapsed or have been destroyed, for example, by earthquake, storm, flood, landslide, or war.
- The bridge is no longer used, but was not demolished because of the cost; for example, the bridges on an abandoned railway line.
- The bridge is completed, but the streets connecting the bridge are not completed.
- The bridge or any other part of the construction can be regarded as a pork barrel project aimed at useless fund spending or money laundering with minor or negligible public usefulness.

== Metaphoric use ==
The term "bridge to nowhere" may be used by political opponents to describe a bridge (or proposed bridge) that serves low-population areas at high cost, usually characterizing it as an instance of pork barrel spending.

By extension, it may refer to any undertaking perceived as both pointless and costly.

== Incomplete and damaged bridges ==
=== Argentina ===
- The two-lane elevated concrete vehicle bridge across the Cosquin River in Cosquin, province of Cordoba, Argentina, that was intended to connect Calle Pedro Ortiz, to the west, to Avenida Capitan Aviador Omar Castillo, to the east, was never opened. The span of the bridge itself was complete, but it was never connected to the road system on either end, and the ends of the span remained blocked by steep piles of rubble. In lieu of the elevated vehicle bridge, the small, low Onofre Marimon Bridge connected the two streets for small volumes of pedestrian traffic. In 2020 it was finally connected at both ends and open to vehicle traffic, and the lower bridge was demolished. The remains of the bridge can still be seen at Puente Mercedes Sosa.

=== Belgium ===
- Rue Emile Pathé/Emile Pathéstraat in Forest, Brussels (50.7996°N 4.3067°E), was originally intended to be part of the southern arc of the R0 Brussels motorway ring, which was never built owing to opposition from local residents. It now functions mostly as a car park.
- In Perwez, a bridge originally destinated to the bypass of the city is now abandoned in the middle of the fields (50.6192°N 4.7696°E).

=== Bulgaria ===
- Bulgaria's capital city of Sofia has a highspeed city bypass called Northern Speed Tangent, which upon completion had three bridges with two clover-style interchanges. These three bridges were built with the intention to connect the north neighbourhoods of Sofia, however since 2016, when the high speed bypass was built, they have not been connected to the city and are currently bridges to nowhere. Plans are being developed for finally connecting the bridges to the city proper, but due to constant changes and disputes between the local government and road agencies, these plans are frozen.

=== Canada ===
- Port Nelson Bridge, an isolated rail bridge near Port Nelson, Manitoba. The connecting rail line was never finished due to labour and material shortages, a lack of financial or political support, and high cost. The envisioned port was also poorly designed and was found to require excessive dredging due to significant sand bars. The project was greatly criticized by several politicians (the media calling it a "gigantic blunder").
- Ontario Highway 69 south of Ontario Highway 522 near Grundy Provincial Park. The two bridges are for the southbound and northbound lanes of the future Ontario Highway 400 connecting Greater Sudbury and Toronto.
- Gaglardi Way in Burnaby, British Columbia: originally ended suddenly as an overpass of Highway 1 at the south end at just a forest, due to a residential subdivision further south, blocking its continuation. The overpass was originally designed as a Cloverleaf interchange, but as the road is not continued, both its northeastern and southeastern cloverleaf ramps were blocked off. Eventually, the dead-end stump and the two blocked off ramps were removed beginning in the late 2000s, and completely removed at mid 2013.

=== China ===
- Yalu River Broken Bridge in Dandong. The south span was destroyed during the Korean War.
- Nandu River Iron Bridge in Hainan is a partially collapsed, steel truss bridge over the Nandu River. It was built by the Imperial Japanese Army during the Second Sino-Japanese War. In October 2000, flooding caused the collapse of the western part of the bridge, leaving three trusses.

=== Czech Republic ===
- The Borovsko Bridge, an unfinished motorway bridge from the 1930s near Borovsko, part of Bernartice municipality, Central Bohemian Region.
- There are several bridges to nowhere, started to be built as a part of extraterritorial highway Vienna-Wrocław (so-called "Hitler's highway"), which remain unfinished and unconnected to the road network.

=== France ===
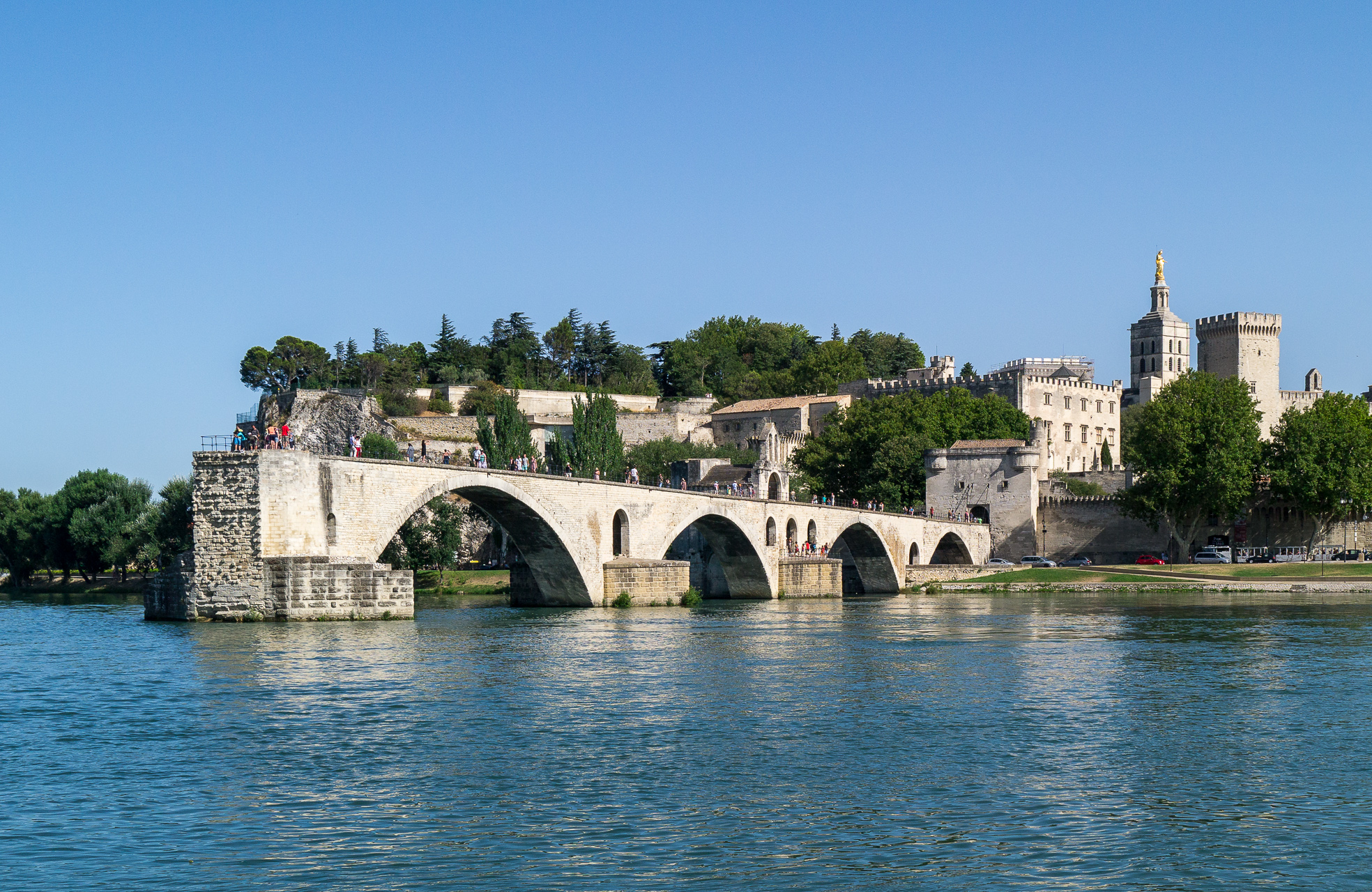
Pont Saint-Bénézet in Avignon, France

- Pont Saint-Bénézet in Avignon over the Rhône river. Several arches were broken by flood in the middle of the 17th century.
- The viaduc du Caramel and viaduc du Carei of the former tramway line from Menton to Sospel.
- The jetée from the Grande Arche de La Défense to the U Arena in Nanterre. Its final stairs are not to be completed.

=== Germany ===
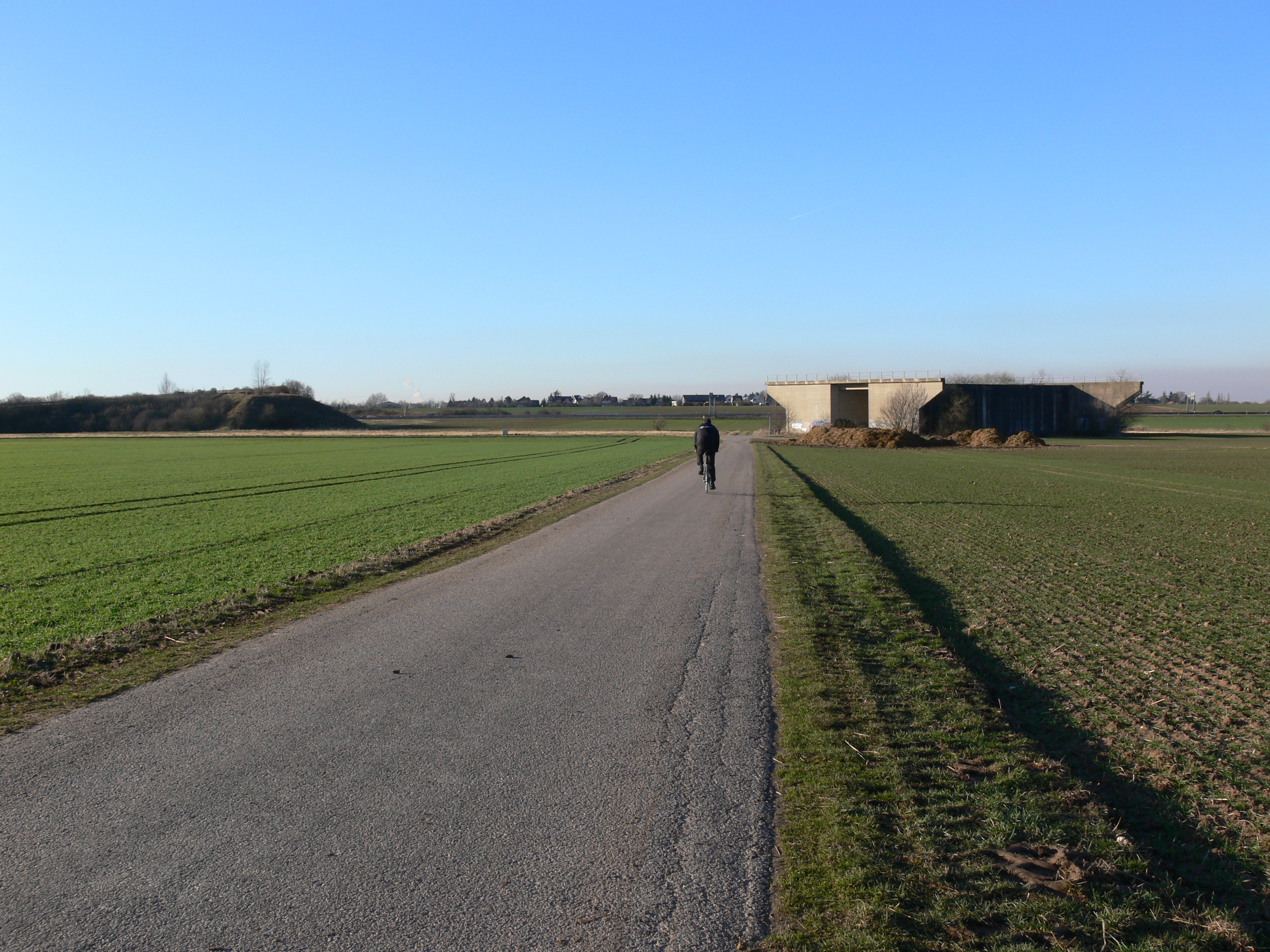
Soda-Brücke Euskirchen

The colloquial name for a bridge to nowhere in Germany is "Soda-Brücke" (a pun on "so da" = "just there"). Many of the bridges were built in the 1970s as part of the Autobahn network, but the oil crisis and rising environmental consciousness slowed many highway extensions.

- The Bundesautobahn 66 had a bridge near Ahl (Bad Soden-Salmünster) built in 1966 that was not connected until 1994.
- The bridge near Euskirchen was planned to be part of Autobahn 56. Construction was stopped, and the existing parts of the highway were renamed Bundesautobahn 562. (50°40′39″N 6°44′54″E)
- The bridge near Merklinde, a suburb of Castrop-Rauxel, was to be part of the B245 expressway and the "New Hellweg". The bridge was completed in 1978 but was never connected. (51.5374°N 7.3391°E)
- The Schänzlebrücke in Konstanz was built 1975 but not connected until 2007. (47.6701°N 9.1630°E)

=== Honduras ===
- The Bridge of Rising Sun in Choluteca, completed in 1998, became a bridge to nowhere the same year when Hurricane Mitch hit Honduras. While the bridge itself survived with minor damage, the roads on either end got entirely washed away and the Choluteca River had carved itself a new channel on the side, leaving the bridge to span dry ground. It eventually got reconnected to the highway in 2003.

=== Hong Kong ===
- In New Kowloon, a flyover used to connect Prince Edward Road East outside Regal Meridien Hotel to the old Kai Tak Airport (coded K72). The airport has since moved and been demolished, leaving the flyover unused, until a new offramp was built in 2020 to connect the K72 flyover to Olympic Avenue (Road D1) and opened to traffic in September 2021.
- In Victoria City on Hong Kong Island, the western end of Connaught Road West Flyover (part of Route 4) was intended to be connected to the shelved Green Island Link and a trunk road along the southwestern coast of the island (previously numbered Route 7).
- A flyover over Tsing Tsuen Interchange in Tsuen Wan, New Territories.
- Railway viaducts to the northwest of Lai King station in southern Kwai Chung, New Territories, near Kwai Chung Park.

=== Hungary ===
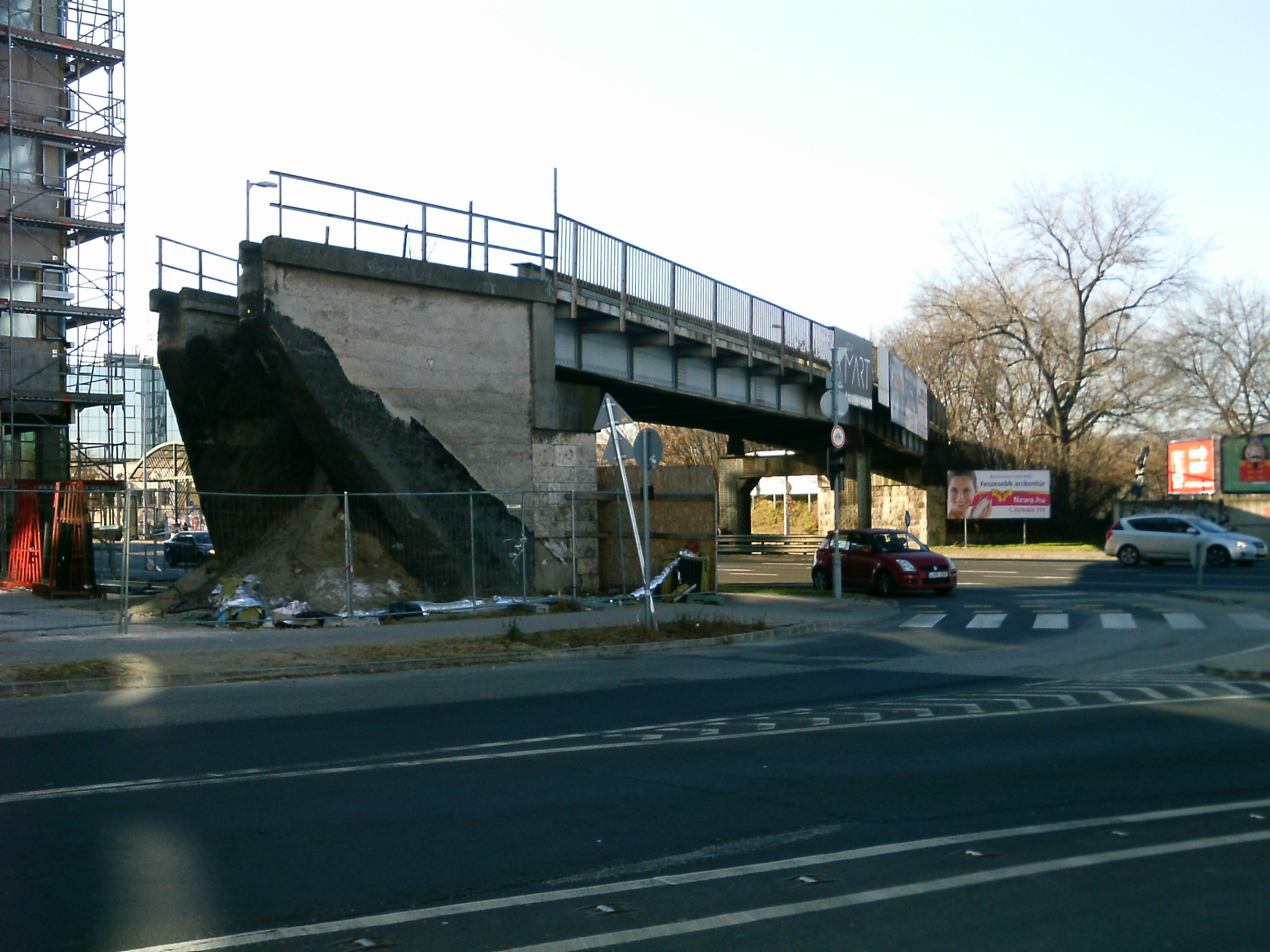
A former railway bridge over the Váci út in Újpest, Budapest, Hungary – with its rail line defunct in the early 1990s, the cityside approach of the bridge was demolished to create space for construction.

- A former railway bridge sits over the Váci út in Budapest. Its rail line was disconnected in the early 1990s, and the east side of the bridge was demolished to make room for new construction. (47.554984°N 19.075610°E) A second bridge sits over a minor road on the same rail line to the southwest, and the former station is now a parking lot.

=== India ===
- Broken bridge, in Chennai, South India, partly collapsed due to strong currents of the river in 1977 and has never been repaired.

=== Indonesia ===
- An unused double-track concrete railway bridge over Ngaglik street in Surabaya. It was originally built for a proposed railway line that would connect Gubeng and Pasar Turi station on an elevated line. Due to economic crisis in the 1930s, which was followed by the Second World War, and lastly the Indonesian National Revolution, the project was never completed; the bridge stood as testimony of the forgotten project. (7°14′56″S 112°45′11″E)
- Also, on Solo-Kertosono Toll Road, Donohudan 1 bridge between Adi Sumarmo Airport Toll Gate & Ngemplak Toll Gate. To be exact, at Km 501+300, is a bridge to nowhere, the purpose is unknown. (7°30′37.691″S 110°46′57.593″E)
- Gajahwong II bridge in Yogyakarta was built in the new order as an alternative road from the downtown straight to Adisutjipto airport but the construction stalled after the end of new order with the east side unconnected to any road. Now the bridge is used by the locals to dry clothes, hanging out, fishing, etc. (7°47′31″S 110°23′46″E)

=== Italy ===
- The Pons Aemilius in Rome.

=== Latvia ===
- An isolated railway bridge in Tukums municipality over Abava river which was built for a planned railroad line Tukums-Kuldīga which was never finished due to the Second World War. (56.9124456°N 22.9760692°E)

=== Nepal ===
- The Bridge to Nowhere, being built, is an incomplete road bridge over the Daroudi River in Gorkha Municipality, meant to connect Nareshwor, Gorkha Municipality - 3 and Jarebar, Siranchowk Rural Municipality - 5.

=== New Zealand ===
- The Bridge to Nowhere, built in 1936, is an isolated 40 metres (130 ft) road bridge over the Mangapurua Stream in Whanganui National Park, North Island.
- There is a bridge crossing over the Northwestern Motorway at Westgate,the bridge carries 2 lanes of Northside Drive, the bridge supports remain, but the entire bridge is expected to be completed by 2046.

=== Norway ===
- Eintveit Bridge, a 25 metres (82 ft)-long two-lane road bridge in Etne Municipality in Vestland county, was completed in 1962 and was intended to be part of a road on the northwestern side of Åkrafjorden. But the road was never built, and the bridge has remained unused except occasionally by hikers. In 2014, broadcaster NRK organized the "opening" of the bridge. Two cars were flown in by helicopter and driven across the bridge.

=== Philippines ===
- The Loboc Bridge in the town of Loboc, Bohol. A steel and concrete bridge which commenced construction in the 1970s but was left unfinished allegedly due to opposition from the Loboc parishioners since the bridge might destroy the 400-year old Loboc Church.

=== Poland ===
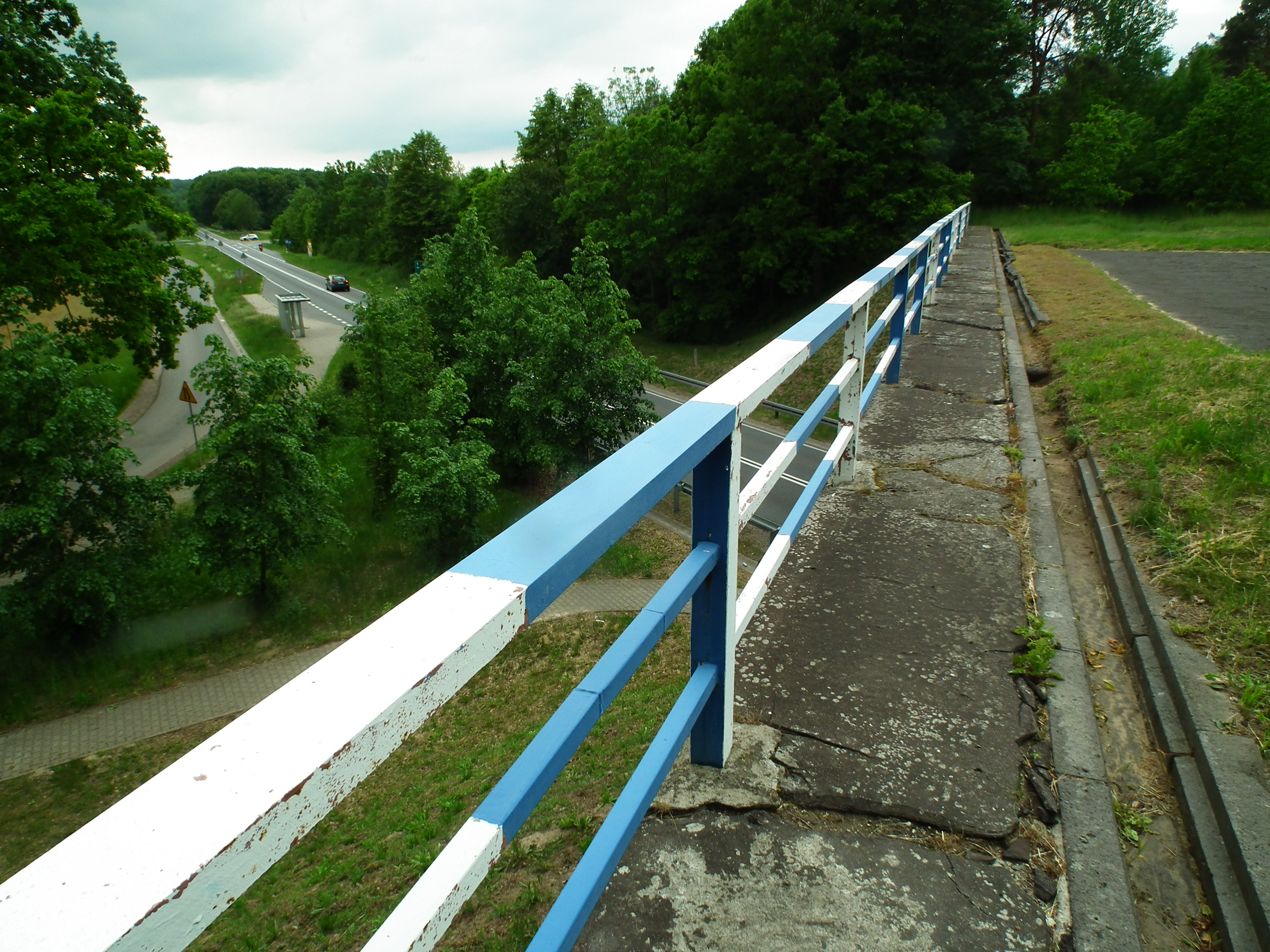
near Lisowo, demolished 2019

- Several structures on unfinished Olimpijka motorway. Its construction started in 1976 with the propaganda goal of completing it in time for the Moscow Olympics in 1980 (hence its unofficial name, as part of Berlin-Moscow connection). Because of the economic crisis which hit the country in the late 1970s and continued throughout the 1980s, only a small section was opened. Construction of another stretch resumed only in 2001, as a part of A2 motorway. Since 2010 the plan was to finish the whole link between the border with Germany and Warsaw, this time for the UEFA Euro 2012 football championships. This meant that weathered remains of 1970s structures had to be demolished in the 2010s.
- Several structures on unfinished Berlinka, Nazi Germany's Reichsautobahn Berlin-Königsberg started in 1936. Some of them have been demolished as late as the 2010s.

=== Romania ===
- Ciurel Bridge is an unfinished infrastructure project located in Bucharest, Romania. It gained significant attention and earned the nickname "Bridge to Nowhere" or "Bridge to Nothing" on social media. The construction was initiated as part of an expansion towards the A1 Highway, but the remaining section of the project, an 8.3-kilometer road, has not been built. Currently, the bridge only serves as a left turn and resolves the traffic issue for those traveling from Virtuții Road to Splaiul Independenței. Pro Infrastructura, an organization that monitors infrastructure projects, argues that the Bucharest City Hall should have made a decision regarding the continuation of the road to the A1 Highway, covering the distance of 8.3 kilometers. Without this connection, the Virtuții Junction (Ciurel Passage) does not effectively address the traffic congestion, as it was originally intended to alleviate the traffic on Iuliu Maniu Boulevard. Sorin Ioniță, an activist who has closely followed the project, criticized it, stating, "This passage will cross a T-intersection on a picturesque bridge with ramps, descend on the other side, and lead the cars to the exact same place as before, Virtuții Road. All at an impressive cost of over 400 million lei. This road passage in Sector 6 is probably the most useless and foolish investment in Romania since '89,". The construction of the passage began in 2010 and was initially scheduled for completion in December 2014. Delays in the project were caused by litigation and financial constraints.

=== Russia ===
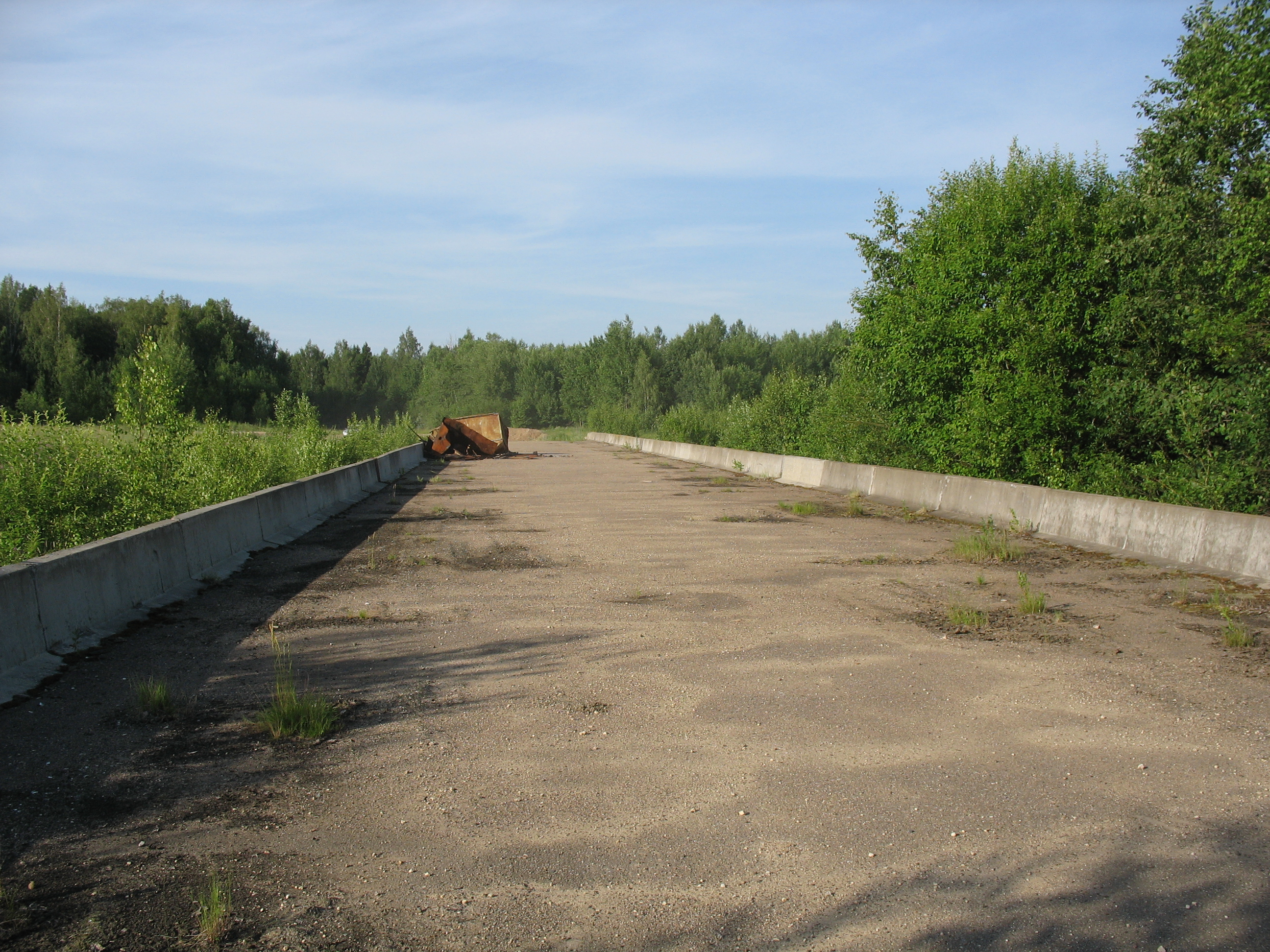
The bridge in Porozovo

- A two-lane vehicle bridge in Porozovo, completed at the end of the 20th century. (57.5042°N 42.0859°E)

=== Slovakia ===
- Viaduct in Kopráš, a never-used railway viaduct in the village of Kopráš near the town of Jelšava in south Slovakia. The viaduct is 120 metres (390 ft) long and 40 metres (130 ft) high. It was finished in 1945 but was never used, because the railway to the viaduct was never completed due to the events of World War II. Next to the viaduct are two finished tunnels without any connection to railways. The tunnel near the village of Slavošovce is 2,800 metres (9,200 ft) long, and the tunnel near Kopráš is 350 metres (1,150 ft) long. These tunnels to nowhere were also never used, because railway construction ended in 1948 before its completion.

=== Spain ===
- Bridge to Nowhere in San Martín de la Vega (built 1933, originally projected in 1926). It was damaged in March 1947 after severe flooding, and it was never repaired. Nowadays only a few sections of it stay in place, and the surroundings are now a recreational site. (40.230249°N 3.544043°W)

=== Taiwan ===
- The Longteng Bridge was a brick arch bridge in Sanyi Township that carried the TRA Old Mountain Line. The 1935 Shinchiku-Taichū Earthquake caused all arches to fall, leaving behind the piers. The 1999 Jiji Earthquake further damaged the piers, which made the government preserve the ruins as a monument to the two earthquakes. It is currently a popular tourist attraction, especially during tung flower season in April to May.

=== Ukraine ===
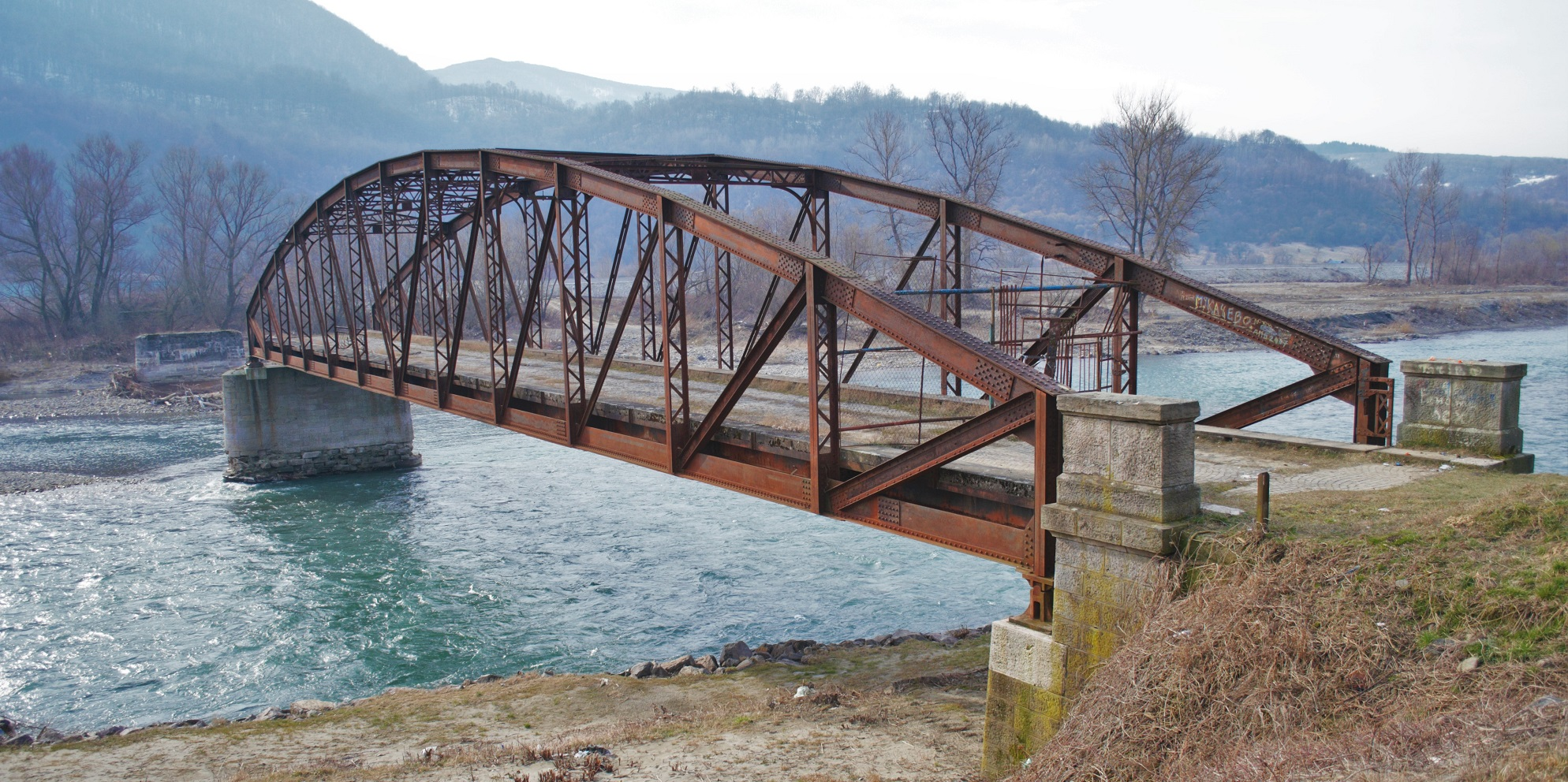
Tiachiv damaged bridge in Ukraine

- A bridge near Tiachiv was a tied-arch bridge leading over the national border to Romania. It was built around 1908-1909 and partially blown up (two of three tied arches) in 1941 during the Second World War by Romania. There are currently no plans to rebuild the bridge. (48.0046°N 23.5764°E)

=== United Kingdom ===
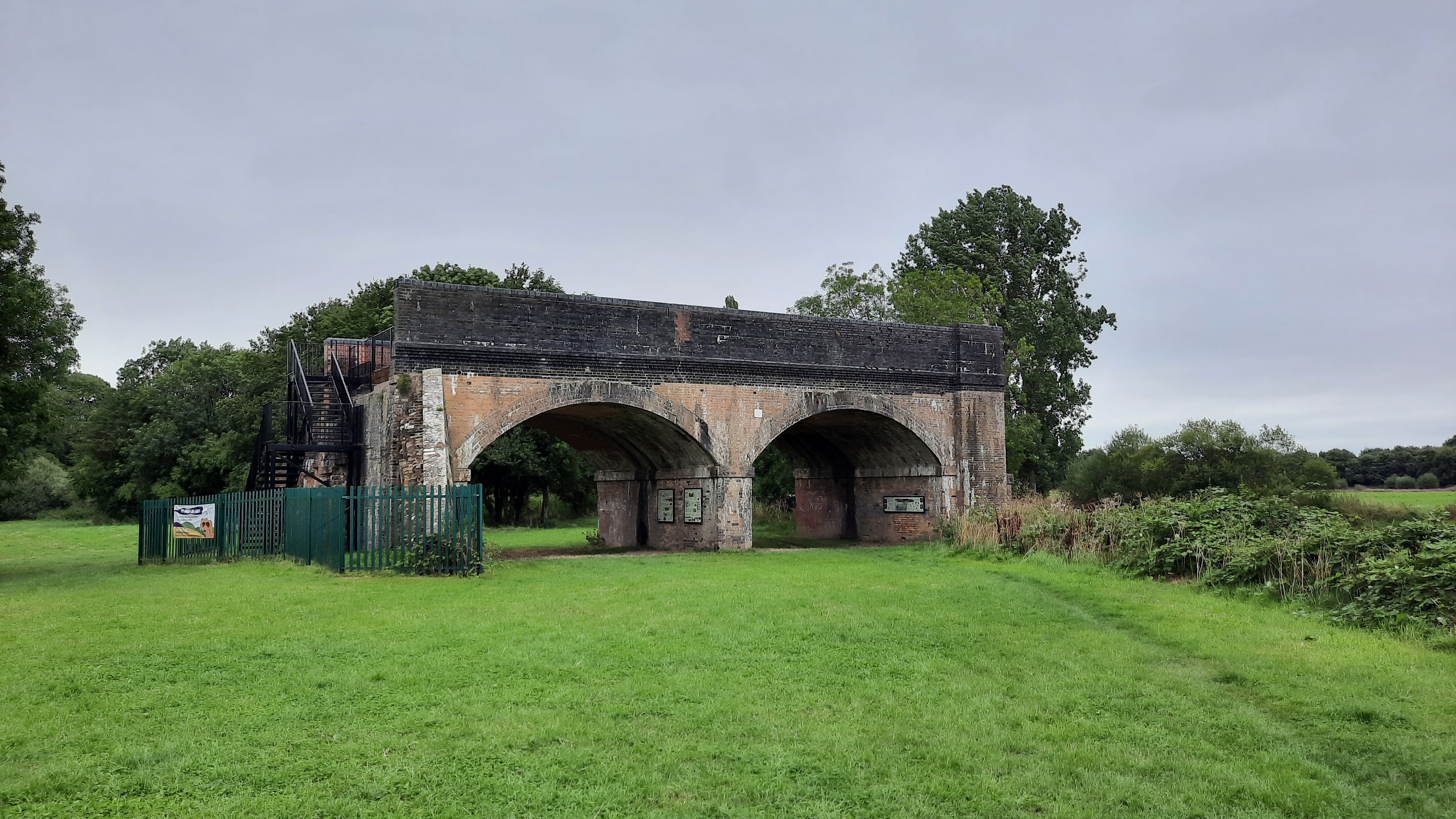
The former Somerset and Dorset Joint Railway bridge at Blandford Forum. Following closure of the line, the span over the river (right) was demolished, and the earth embankment on the left was reused for nearby flood defence work, leaving it as a "bridge to nowhere".

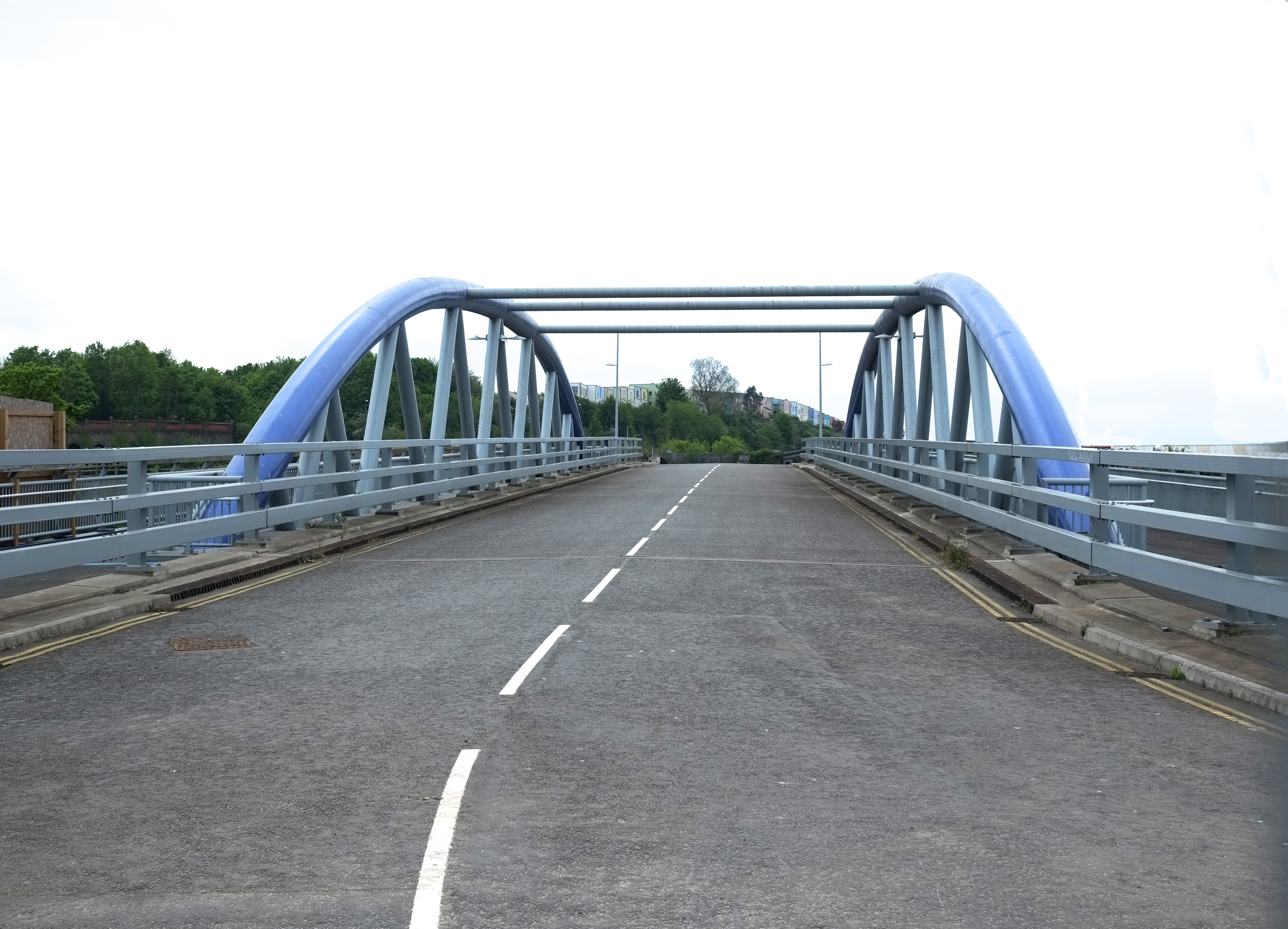
Brock's Bridge over the River Avon in Bristol. Originally intended as the entrance to the Bristol Arena, construction of the main building was halted due to lack of funds and the bridge was left derelict.

- Blandford Forum former railway bridge.
- Bewley Street Footbridge, in Colliers Wood, London, constructed in 2007, was blocked off at one end due to a dispute over the cost of building an access ramp. The ramp was finally completed in June 2015 and renamed "Gam Gurung Bridge" after a local councillor.
- Duddeston Viaduct, a railway viaduct in Birmingham commonly known as the "Viaduct to Nowhere", built as a through route in 1846 but never used as such due to inter-company politics. 52.4747°N 1.8804°W
- The Lichfield Canal Aqueduct built in 2003 in anticipation of the eventual restoration of the Lichfield Canal over the M6 Toll in Staffordshire.
- The Mancunian Way – the A57(M) – in Manchester has a length of unused slip road (53.4720°N 2.2362°W) blocked off by a traffic sign, after modifications to local streets to accept traffic from the road (A34) were not carried out.
- Unknown bridge with unused slip road over the A120 east of Colchester, Essex 51.8916°N 1.0117°E
- Barracks Road and Cavalry Street bridges north of the A671 Westway in Burnley, Lancashire, cross the East Lancashire railway line and were stopped up at both ends following the construction of the M65 in 1981.
- An abandoned highway bridge at 51.279002°N 0.154646°W. It was planned for the M23 to extended further north from its abrupt ending as part of the London Ringways scheme. Some of the southern end is still accessible and used as a depot for highway maintenance, but most of it is fenced off, notably when the A23 and open M23 pass under wide bridges.
- One part of the Borough Road, Birkenhead A5227 flyover adjoining to Queensway Tunnel is incomplete.
- M8 Bridge to Nowhere, two separate bridges over the M8 motorway in Glasgow: one eventually had an office block constructed on it; the other, originally built in the 1970s, remained unfinished until July 2013.
- A stub protruding from a road bridge across the A1020 around Beckton which forms part of a southbound exit. It was planned to be part of a cancelled approach to the East London River Crossing.

=== United States ===
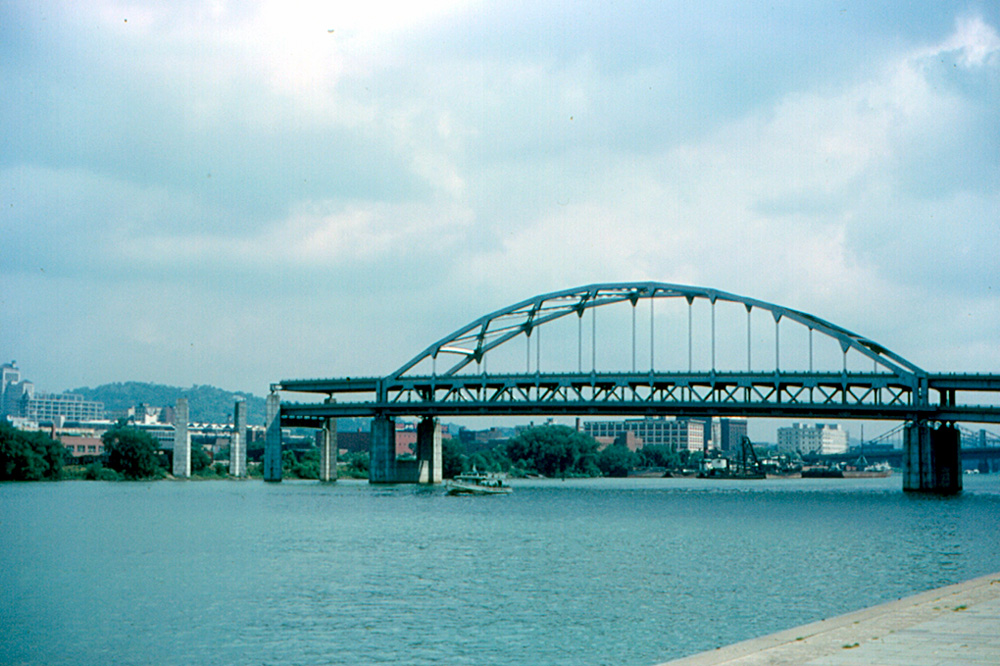
Fort Duquesne Bridge in 1966 before the ramps were completed

- Arboretum "ghost ramps" (built 1960s), a set of ramps and bridges south of Marsh Island near Portage Bay in Seattle that were intended to be an interchange from Washington State Route 520 and the proposed R. H. Thomson Expressway. When plans for the expressway were scrapped following a citizens' freeway revolt led by a chapter of the Black Panther Party, the interchange ramps and bridges remained in place and are mostly unused. On January 31, 2013, Washington state announced that the ghost ramps would be removed sometime between 2014 and 2016. The ramps were demolished in 2017, but a section was left standing in memory of the protests that cancelled the expressway project.
- Big Four Bridge (built 1895), a 2,530-foot (770 m) single-track railroad bridge over the Ohio River in Louisville, Kentucky, which was abandoned in 1968 and had both its approach spans removed and sold for scrap the following year. In February 2013, the bridge was reopened on one end for pedestrian and bicycle traffic. In May 2014, the Jeffersonville, Indiana, ramp opened, allowing pedestrians and cyclists to travel between downtown Jeffersonville and Waterfront Park in Louisville.
- Bridge to Nowhere (San Gabriel Mountains) (built 1936), an isolated road bridge over the San Gabriel River in southern California. The connecting road was never completed. The bridge is a popular destination for hikers.
- A pair of unused overpasses near what is now the southern terminus of Connecticut State Route 11. These bridges were built as part of the original plan for Route 11, which would have seen it extend further south to I-95 in New London. Construction was halted in 1972 due to lack of funding.
- Fort Duquesne Bridge (built 1963), a road bridge over the Allegheny River in Pittsburgh, Pennsylvania, which ended mid-air until the ramps were completed in 1969.
- Miles Glacier Bridge (built 1910), also known as the "Million Dollar Bridge", was converted from railroad use to motor vehicle use; It is at the northern end of the unfinished Copper River Highway near Cordova, Alaska. Construction stopped in 1964 when an earthquake damaged the 1,549-foot (472 m) bridge. Although since repaired and reopened, the bridge is nonetheless currently of limited utility due to damage at other points along the route.
- Hoan Bridge (built 1973), a 2-mile (3 km) road bridge over the Milwaukee River in Milwaukee, Wisconsin, which was unused until access roads were completed in 1977, was lacking freeway connections at the southern end until 1998, and was "going nowhere again" for two months while closed for major repairs after a span partially collapsed in December 2000.
- Mebane's Bridge is a road bridge over the Dan River in Rockingham County on the outskirts of the town of Eden, North Carolina, which was at the center of the landmark Luten Bridge Co. vs. Rockingham County lawsuit that made jurisprudence in 1929 when the contractor continued work on it well after the contract to build it was rescinded and subsequently sued to be reimbursed for this work.
- Pier 19 (demolished 2012) of a proposed second span of the Ambassador Bridge connecting Windsor, Ontario, and Detroit, Michigan. No second span had ever been approved for this privately owned bridge, largely because the proposal would dump excessive traffic onto Windsor city surface streets. However, its owners built ramps for the proposed span in an attempt to counter an internationally supported proposal for a Detroit River International Crossing to the Windsor-Essex Parkway further downriver. The unauthorized ramp was removed in 2012 by court order.
- An interchange on US 160 southeast of Durango, Colorado completed in November 2011. The bridge was intended to connect to a relocated US 550, but disputes arose over the new US 550 alignment's potential effect on wetlands, archaeological sites, and property fragmentation. The Colorado Department of Transportation signed an agreement with the Federal Highway Administration in spring 2015 regarding the final alignment of US 550. The interchange was completed in 2024.
- The San Francisco–Oakland Bay Bridge bicycle and pedestrian path was opened in September 2013, but was only connected on the Oakland end of the bridge. In October 2016, the connection to Yerba Buena Island was opened, but as of 2018 there is no bicycle or pedestrian access across the western portion of the Bay Bridge to San Francisco.
- Near Greenville, Mississippi, there are several bridges to nowhere for the US 82 bypass that was built before construction halted for years before resuming in 2022. The bypass was ultimately completed in August 2025.

== Bridges to unpopulated or underpopulated areas ==
=== Australia ===
- John Pirie Bridge in Port Pirie was built in the 1970s to encourage development of industry on the other side of Port Pirie Creek. No development ensued; the bridge leads only to a few gravel roads otherwise unconnected.

=== Canada ===
- In Jasper National Park, Alberta, at the outlet of Maligne Lake, there is a bridge that crosses the outlet river and proceeds about 300 metres (980 ft) to a parking lot and several hiking trails and a boat launch. The bridge cost millions of dollars to build and was part of a proposed route through the mountains that was never completed.
- In the Regional Municipality of Wood Buffalo, north-eastern Alberta, the Peter Lougheed Bridge crosses the Athabasca River, servicing industrial work sites and leading to the start of the winter road to Fort Chipewyan. Nicknamed the bridge to nowhere due to lack of development at the time of construction.

=== Ireland ===
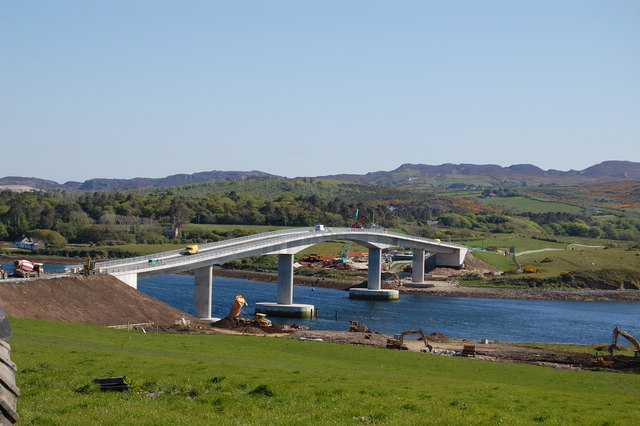
Harry Blaney Bridge, Ireland

- The Harry Blaney Bridge in County Donegal spans 340 m (1,120 ft) and spans Mulroy Bay, connecting the Fanad and Rosguill peninsulas. Opened in 2009 at a cost of €20 million, it was criticised as a bridge to nowhere due to the low population of the area (less than 3,000 on the two peninsulas). Supporters cited the tourism potential of linking the two areas. In 2014, local paper The Donegal Daily admitted that the bridge was "still rarely used."

=== Malaysia ===
- The Bunting Island Bridge in Yan district, Kedah. The 2.3 kilometres (1.4 mi) bridge connects uninhabited Bunting Island to the mainland. Built around 2002–2005, the bridge cost MYR120 million.

=== Malta ===
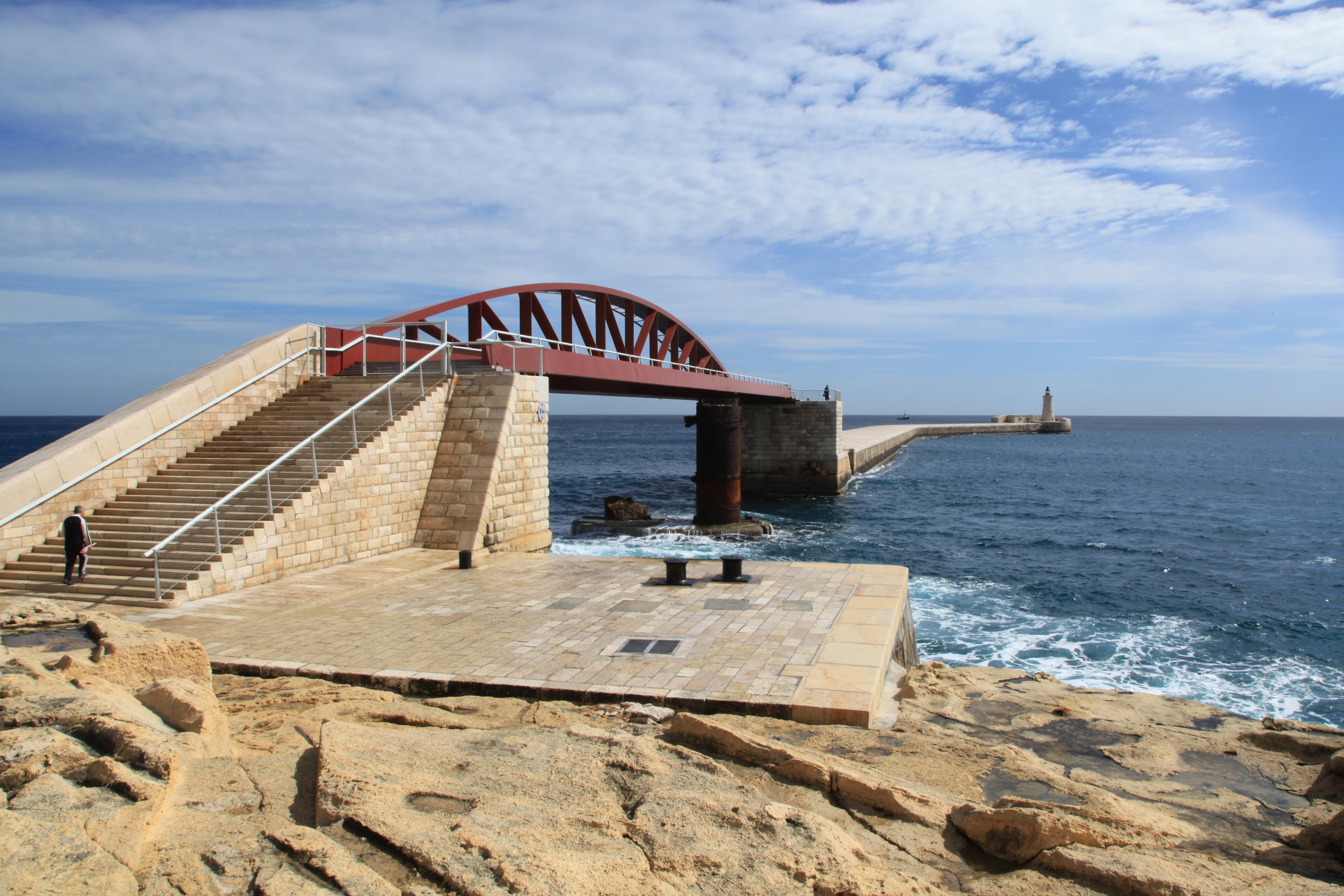
The St. Elmo Bridge in Valletta, Malta has been called a bridge to nowhere since it only leads to a breakwater and a small lighthouse

- The St Elmo Bridge leads from the foreshore of Valletta to the breakwater at the entrance of the Grand Harbour. Critics disapproved of the construction cost of €2.8 million and have called it a "bridge to nowhere".

=== Russia ===
- The Russky Bridge in Vladivostok was criticised as a "bridge to nowhere", costing about one billion US dollars and serving an island where only 5,000 people live.
- A four-lane vehicle overpass across the Moscow Ring Road at kilometer 83 (sometimes called the Molokovsky Overpass) continues Molokova Street in the Lianozovo District of Moscow outside the city. Molokova Street is in a gated community with only local traffic allowed; at the other end, the bridge serves only the Lianozovo Cemetery with a small parking lot next to it, coming to a dead end before a forest. As a result, the overpass only receives significant traffic on prayer for the dead days such as Saturday of Souls.

=== United States ===
- In 1998, the Admiral Clarey Bridge, Hawaii, connected Ford Island to the Kamehameha Highway and was called the "bridge to nowhere" because of the considerable costs required to connect 45 families to O'ahu.
- In 2005, the United States Congress passed an omnibus spending bill that contained a $442 million earmark for constructing two Alaskan bridges. Pushed forward by Alaska Representative Don Young and Senator Ted Stevens, the Gravina Island Bridge was intended to provide a link between the Ketchikan airport on Gravina Island and the city of Ketchikan at a cost of $233 million in federal grant money. It received nationwide attention as a symbol of pork-barrel spending. Since Gravina Island only had a population of 50, the bridge became known as the "Bridge to Nowhere" during the run-up to the 2008 presidential election.
- In 2014, Alaska's longest bridge, the Tanana River Bridge, was completed across the Tanana River at a cost of $187 million. The 3,300 feet (1,000 m) long bridge consists of a 12-foot (3.7 m) wide gravel path that connects a gravel spur road off the Richardson Highway near Salcha, Alaska, to the roadless Tanana Flats. The bridge will be almost exclusively for military use with limited access for hunting license holders. Due to the current lack of infrastructure in the Tanana Flats and the ongoing uncertainty in Department of Defense spending, there may be limited use of the bridge.

== Obsolete bridges and approaches ==
=== Canada ===
- Ontario Highway 548 in Canada has a short stub of roadway (with double-yellow line still visible) next to a more recent bridge approach.
- The former Bay of Quinte Railway mainline in Napanee (acquired by the now-defunct Canadian Northern Railway in 1910, extended to a Smiths Falls station but abandoned by the late 1970s) still has an Ontario Highway 401 overpass. The rail overpass served a Goodyear tyre factory across the highway until the track was disconnected at Napanee station in 2010; it now goes nowhere. A bascule bridge on the same defunct line crosses the UNESCO-listed Rideau Canal at Smiths Falls, Ontario; that rail bridge sits permanently opened to marine traffic but is protected as part of a listed historic site.
- CN's Lachine Canal Swing Bridge in Montreal, Canada, an abandoned railway bridge that has been left in the 'open' position in the middle of the Lachine Canal between its successor rail bridge and the Wellington Bridge.
- The Michigan Central Railway Bridge over the Niagara Gorge between Niagara Falls, Ontario and Niagara Falls, New York, owned by Canadian Pacific Kansas City, carried a single railway track until 2001. The tracks on either side of the bridge have since been entirely removed and the bridge itself is fenced off on the ends as well as walled off in the middle.
- Metrotown station in Vancouver has had a bridge to nowhere since 2016, when a pedestrian bridge over Central Boulevard was cut off by a reconstruction of the station. The bridge is blocked on both ends.

=== United Arab Emirates ===
- In the United Arab Emirates, a suspension bridge links Abu Dhabi city and Hodariyat island. The bridge was opened in 2012, but vehicles are not allowed to use it. It appeared to be a waste of money. Recently the bridge has opened; the approach road has been extended on the island, and a parking lot has been paved. There are also some small cafes there.

=== United States ===
- The Abandoned Pennsylvania Turnpike features several bridges that are no longer used for their intended purpose of vehicular traffic, but are still used by pedestrians and cyclists. The Pennsylvania Turnpike Commission demolished two of the bridges in 2005, one over US 30 in Breezewood, Pennsylvania and the other further east on Pump Station Road, partially to mark the property lines between the PTC-owned sections that still connect to the active mainline Pennsylvania Turnpike and the section that was sold off to Southern Alleghenies Conservancy in 2001, the latter of which owns the section that features the Rays Hill and Sideling Hill Tunnels.
- The Illinois Central Missouri River Bridge between Omaha, Nebraska and Council Bluffs, Iowa is a disused double-swing railroad bridge. Closed to rail traffic in 1980, the eastern span was secured in the open position to allow for unimpeded river traffic. Initially, the bridge was planned to be used as a contingency should issues affect the Union Pacific Missouri River Bridge approximately 2 miles (3.2 km) to the south, but the rails that formed the approach on the Iowa side were removed in the mid-2000s.
- A bridge that once carried West Mound Street over I-70/I-71 in Columbus, Ohio was abandoned in the 1990s due to redevelopment projects that left West Mound Street with two discontinuous sections. The bridge subsequently became a homeless camp before being cleared by the city of Columbus for safety reasons. The bridge is slated to be demolished in 2022 by ODOT without a replacement as part of a widening project of the I-70/I-71 corridor in Downtown Columbus.
- McPhaul Suspension Bridge, in Arizona, United States.
- Crook Point Bascule Bridge, in Providence, Rhode Island.

== Bridges originally criticized as "a bridge to nowhere" ==
- Vincent Thomas Bridge (built 1963), a 1.15-mile (1.85 km) road bridge over Los Angeles Harbor in California, originally dubbed a "bridge to nowhere" later became a heavily used bridge.
- Portsmouth Square pedestrian bridge in San Francisco, California, criticized as a rarely used "bridge to nowhere"

== See also ==
- Abandoned railway
- Unused highway
- White elephant
