= Yamnovo =

Yamnovo Ямново
- Village
- Location within Ivanovo Oblast Location within Russia
- Coordinates: 57°38′N 41°43′E
- Country: Russia
- Region: Ivanovo Oblast
- District: Zavolzhsky District
- Time zone: UTC+3:00

Yamnovo (Russian: Ямново) is a rural locality (a village) in Zavolzhsky District, Ivanovo Oblast, Russia. Population: 10 (2010 census);

== Geography ==
This rural locality is located 29 km from Zavolzhsk (the district's administrative centre), 85 km from Ivanovo (capital of Ivanovo Oblast) and 322 km from Moscow. Podelovo is the nearest rural locality.
