= Kinino =

Kinino Кинино
- Village
- Location within Ivanovo Oblast Location within Russia
- Coordinates: 57°28′N 42°12′E
- Country: Russia
- Region: Ivanovo Oblast
- District: Zavolzhsky District
- Time zone: UTC+3:00

Kinino (Russian: Кинино) is a rural locality (a village) in Zavolzhsky District, Ivanovo Oblast, Russia. Population: 26 (2010 census);

== Geography ==
This rural locality is located 5 km from Zavolzhsk (the district's administrative centre), 91 km from Ivanovo (capital of Ivanovo Oblast) and 334 km from Moscow. Vershinino is the nearest rural locality.
