= Bolotnikovo, Ivanovo Oblast =

Bolotnikovo Болотниково
- Village
- Location within Ivanovo Oblast Location within Russia
- Coordinates: 57°30′N 42°07′E
- Country: Russia
- Region: Ivanovo Oblast
- District: Zavolzhsky District
- Time zone: UTC+3:00

Bolotnikovo (Russian: Болотниково) is a rural locality (a village) in Zavolzhsky District, Ivanovo Oblast, Russia. Population: 14 (2010 census);

== Geography ==
This rural locality is located 1 km from Zavolzhsk (the district's administrative centre), 90 km from Ivanovo (capital of Ivanovo Oblast) and 332 km from Moscow. Pridorozhny is the nearest rural locality.
