= Ovsyanitsy =

Ovsyanitsy Овсяницы
- Village
- Location within Ivanovo Oblast Location within Russia
- Coordinates: 57°30′N 42°20′E
- Country: Russia
- Region: Ivanovo Oblast
- District: Zavolzhsky District
- Time zone: UTC+3:00

Ovsyanitsy (Russian: Овсяницы) is a rural locality (a village) in Zavolzhsky District, Ivanovo Oblast, Russia. Population: 13 (2010 census);

== Geography ==
This rural locality is located 13 km from Zavolzhsk (the district's administrative centre), 100 km from Ivanovo (capital of Ivanovo Oblast) and 343 km from Moscow. Dolmatovsky is the nearest rural locality.
