= Patrareyka =

Patrareyka Патракейка
- Village
- Location within Ivanovo Oblast Location within Russia
- Coordinates: 57°31′N 42°14′E
- Country: Russia
- Region: Ivanovo Oblast
- District: Zavolzhsky District
- Time zone: UTC+3:00

Patrareyka (Russian: Патракейка) is a rural locality (a village) in Zavolzhsky District, Ivanovo Oblast, Russia. Population: 6 (2010 census); 4 (2002 census);

== Geography ==
This rural locality is located 7 km from Zavolzhsk (the district's administrative centre), 96 km from Ivanovo (capital of Ivanovo Oblast) and 338 km from Moscow. Antropovo is the nearest rural locality.
