= Ananyino, Zavolzhsky District, Ivanovo Oblast =

Ananyino Ананьино
- Village
- Location within Ivanovo Oblast Location within Russia
- Coordinates: 57°32′N 42°16′E
- Country: Russia
- Region: Ivanovo Oblast
- District: Zavolzhsky District
- Time zone: UTC+3:00

Ananyino (Russian: Акнада) is a rural locality (a village) in Zavolzhsky District, Ivanovo Oblast, Russia. Population: 5 (2010 census);

== Geography ==
This rural locality is located 9 km from Zavolzhsk (the district's administrative centre), 98 km from Ivanovo (capital of Ivanovo Oblast) and 341 km from Moscow. Mera is the nearest rural locality.
