= Kuren, Ivanovo Oblast =

Kuren Курень
- Selo
- Location within Ivanovo Oblast Location within Russia
- Coordinates: 57°25′N 41°49′E
- Country: Russia
- Region: Ivanovo Oblast
- District: Zavolzhsky District
- Time zone: UTC+3:00

Kuren (Russian: Курень) is a rural locality (a selo) in Zavolzhsky District, Ivanovo Oblast, Russia. Population: 101 (2010 census);

== Geography ==
This rural locality is located 20 km from Zavolzhsk (the district's administrative centre), 70 km from Ivanovo (capital of Ivanovo Oblast) and 312 km from Moscow. Logintsevo is the nearest rural locality.
