= Novlyanskoye =

Novlyanskoye Новлянское
- Selo
- Location within Ivanovo Oblast Location within Russia
- Coordinates: 57°27′N 41°43′E
- Country: Russia
- Region: Ivanovo Oblast
- District: Zavolzhsky District
- Time zone: UTC+3:00

Novlyanskoye (Russian: Новлянское) is a rural locality (a selo) in Zavolzhsky District, Ivanovo Oblast, Russia. Population: 226 (2010 census); 318 (2002 census);

== Geography ==
This rural locality is located 25 km from Zavolzhsk (the district's administrative centre), 68 km from Ivanovo (capital of Ivanovo Oblast) and 310 km from Moscow. Antipikha is the nearest rural locality.
