= Lobantsevo =

Lobantsevo Лобанцево
- Village
- Location within Ivanovo Oblast Location within Russia
- Coordinates: 57°33′N 41°58′E
- Country: Russia
- Region: Ivanovo Oblast
- District: Zavolzhsky District
- Time zone: UTC+3:00

Lobantsevo (Russian: Лобанцево) is a rural locality (a village) in Zavolzhsky District, Ivanovo Oblast, Russia. Population: 27 (2010 census);

== Geography ==
This rural locality is located 12 km from Zavolzhsk (the district's administrative centre), 87 km from Ivanovo (capital of Ivanovo Oblast) and 328 km from Moscow. Bykovka is the nearest rural locality.
