= Kistega =

Kistega Кистега
- Selo
- Location within Ivanovo Oblast Location within Russia
- Coordinates: 57°36′N 41°52′E
- Country: Russia
- Region: Ivanovo Oblast
- District: Zavolzhsky District
- Time zone: UTC+3:00

Kistega (Russian: Кистега) is a rural locality (a selo) in Zavolzhsky District, Ivanovo Oblast, Russia. Population: 53 (2010 census); 71 (2002 census);

== Geography ==
This rural locality is located 21 km from Zavolzhsk (the district's administrative centre), 88 km from Ivanovo (capital of Ivanovo Oblast) and 327 km from Moscow. Golochelovo is the nearest rural locality.
