= Vodomerovo =

Vodomerovo Водомерово
- Village
- Location within Ivanovo Oblast Location within Russia
- Coordinates: 57°31′N 41°57′E
- Country: Russia
- Region: Ivanovo Oblast
- District: Zavolzhsky District
- Time zone: UTC+3:00

Vodomerovo (Russian: Водомерово) is a rural locality (a village) in Zavolzhsky District, Ivanovo Oblast, Russia. Population: 7 (2010 census);

== Geography ==
This rural locality is located 11 km from Zavolzhsk (the district's administrative centre), 83 km from Ivanovo (capital of Ivanovo Oblast) and 325 km from Moscow. Buyakovo is the nearest rural locality.
