= Boristsevo, Zavolzhsky District, Ivanovo Oblast =

Boristsevo Борисцево
- Village
- Location within Ivanovo Oblast Location within Russia
- Coordinates: 57°30′N 42°04′E
- Country: Russia
- Region: Ivanovo Oblast
- District: Zavolzhsky District
- Time zone: UTC+3:00

Boristsevo (Russian: Борисцево) is a rural locality (a village) in Zavolzhsky District, Ivanovo Oblast, Russia. Population: 200 (2010 census);

== Geography ==
This rural locality is located 4 km from Zavolzhsk (the district's administrative centre), 87 km from Ivanovo (capital of Ivanovo Oblast) and 329 km from Moscow. Porozovo is the nearest rural locality.
