= Korotikha =

Korotikha Коротиха
- Village
- Location within Ivanovo Oblast Location within Russia
- Coordinates: 57°27′N 42°13′E
- Country: Russia
- Region: Ivanovo Oblast
- District: Zavolzhsky District
- Time zone: UTC+3:00

Korotikha (Russian: Коротиха) is a rural locality (a village) in Zavolzhsky District, Ivanovo Oblast, Russia. Population: 479 (2010 census);

== Geography ==
This rural locality is located 7 km from Zavolzhsk (the district's administrative centre), 91 km from Ivanovo (capital of Ivanovo Oblast) and 334 km from Moscow. Vershinino is the nearest rural locality.
