= Butovo, Zavolzhsky District, Ivanovo Oblast =

Butovo Бутово
- Village
- Location within Ivanovo Oblast Location within Russia
- Coordinates: 57°26′N 41°46′E
- Country: Russia
- Region: Ivanovo Oblast
- District: Zavolzhsky District
- Time zone: UTC+3:00

Butovo (Russian: Бутово) is a rural locality (a village) in Zavolzhsky District, Ivanovo Oblast, Russia. Population: 15 (2010 census);

== Geography ==
This rural locality is located 23 km from Zavolzhsk (the district's administrative centre), 70 km from Ivanovo (capital of Ivanovo Oblast) and 312 km from Moscow. Savitovo is the nearest rural locality.
