= Ruposovo, Ivanovo Oblast =

Ruposovo Рупосово
- Village
- Location within Ivanovo Oblast Location within Russia
- Coordinates: 57°26′N 41°41′E
- Country: Russia
- Region: Ivanovo Oblast
- District: Zavolzhsky District
- Time zone: UTC+3:00

Ruposovo (Russian: Рупосово) is a rural locality (a village) in Zavolzhsky District, Ivanovo Oblast, Russia. Population: 7 (2010 census);

== Geography ==
This rural locality is located 27 km from Zavolzhsk (the district's administrative centre), 66 km from Ivanovo (capital of Ivanovo Oblast) and 308 km from Moscow. Karpunikha is the nearest rural locality.
