= Logintsevo, Ivanovo Oblast =

Logintsevo Логинцево
- Selo
- Location within Ivanovo Oblast Location within Russia
- Coordinates: 57°25′N 41°50′E
- Country: Russia
- Region: Ivanovo Oblast
- District: Zavolzhsky District
- Time zone: UTC+3:00

Logintsevo (Russian: Логинцево) is a rural locality (a selo) in Zavolzhsky District, Ivanovo Oblast, Russia. Population: 6 (2010 census);

== Geography ==
This rural locality is located 19 km from Zavolzhsk (the district's administrative centre), 71 km from Ivanovo (capital of Ivanovo Oblast) and 314 km from Moscow. Nazarovo is the nearest rural locality.
