= Lykovo, Zavolzhsky District, Ivanovo Oblast =

Lykovo Лыково
- Village
- Location within Ivanovo Oblast Location within Russia
- Coordinates: 57°38′N 41°42′E
- Country: Russia
- Region: Ivanovo Oblast
- District: Zavolzhsky District
- Time zone: UTC+3:00

Lykovo (Russian: Лыково) is a rural locality (a village) in Zavolzhsky District, Ivanovo Oblast, Russia. Population: 10 (2010 census);

== Geography ==
This rural locality is located 30 km from Zavolzhsk (the district's administrative centre), 84 km from Ivanovo (capital of Ivanovo Oblast) and 321 km from Moscow. Podelovo is the nearest rural locality.
