= Nelidovo, Ivanovo Oblast =

Nelidovo Нелидово
- Village
- Location within Ivanovo Oblast Location within Russia
- Coordinates: 57°29′N 41°52′E
- Country: Russia
- Region: Ivanovo Oblast
- District: Zavolzhsky District
- Time zone: UTC+3:00

Nelidovo (Russian: Нелидово) is a rural locality (a village) in Zavolzhsky District, Ivanovo Oblast, Russia. Population: 7 (2010 census);

== Geography ==
This rural locality is located 16 km from Zavolzhsk (the district's administrative centre), 78 km from Ivanovo (capital of Ivanovo Oblast) and 320 km from Moscow. Chelesnikovo is the nearest rural locality.
