= Yesiplevo, Ivanovo Oblast =

Yesiplevo Есиплево
- Selo
- Location within Ivanovo Oblast Location within Russia
- Coordinates: 57°31′N 41°50′E
- Country: Russia
- Region: Ivanovo Oblast
- District: Zavolzhsky District
- Time zone: UTC+3:00

Yesiplevo (Russian: Есиплево) is a rural locality (a selo) in Zavolzhsky District, Ivanovo Oblast, Russia. Population: 697 (2010 census); 798 (2002 census);

== Geography ==
This rural locality is located 18 km from Zavolzhsk (the district's administrative centre), 79 km from Ivanovo (capital of Ivanovo Oblast) and 320 km from Moscow. Novaya Derevnya is the nearest rural locality.
