= Vertluzhnoye =

Vertluzhnoye Вертлужное
- Village
- Location within Ivanovo Oblast Location within Russia
- Coordinates: 57°29′N 41°58′E
- Country: Russia
- Region: Ivanovo Oblast
- District: Zavolzhsky District
- Time zone: UTC+3:00

Vertluzhnoye (Russian: Вертлужное) is a rural locality (a village) in Zavolzhsky District, Ivanovo Oblast, Russia. Population: 16 (2010 census);

== Geography ==
This rural locality is located 9 km from Zavolzhsk (the district's administrative centre), 82 km from Ivanovo (capital of Ivanovo Oblast) and 325 km from Moscow. Goluzino is the nearest rural locality.
