= Martynikha, Zavolzhsky District, Ivanovo Oblast =

Martynikha Мартыниха
- Village
- Location within Ivanovo Oblast Location within Russia
- Coordinates: 57°27′N 42°15′E
- Country: Russia
- Region: Ivanovo Oblast
- District: Zavolzhsky District
- Time zone: UTC+3:00

Martynikha (Russian: Мартыниха) is a rural locality (a village) in Zavolzhsky District, Ivanovo Oblast, Russia. Population: 31 (2010 census);

== Geography ==
This rural locality is located 8 km from Zavolzhsk (the district's administrative centre), 93 km from Ivanovo (capital of Ivanovo Oblast) and 336 km from Moscow. Cheganovo is the nearest rural locality.
