= Mera, Ivanovo Oblast =

Mera Мера
- Selo
- Location within Ivanovo Oblast Location within Russia
- Coordinates: 57°32′N 42°16′E
- Country: Russia
- Region: Ivanovo Oblast
- District: Zavolzhsky District
- Time zone: UTC+3:00

Mera (Russian: Мера) is a rural locality (a selo) in Zavolzhsky District, Ivanovo Oblast, Russia. Population: 20 (2010 census);

== Geography ==
This rural locality is located 10 km from Zavolzhsk (the district's administrative centre), 99 km from Ivanovo (capital of Ivanovo Oblast) and 342 km from Moscow. Kunitsyno is the nearest rural locality.
