= Zhazhlevo =

Zhazhlevo Жажлево
- Selo
- Location within Ivanovo Oblast Location within Russia
- Coordinates: 57°27′N 42°24′E
- Country: Russia
- Region: Ivanovo Oblast
- District: Zavolzhsky District
- Time zone: UTC+3:00

Zhazhlevo (Russian: Жажлево) is a rural locality (a selo) in Zavolzhsky District, Ivanovo Oblast, Russia. Population: 663 (2010 census); 834 (2002 census);

== Geography ==
This rural locality is located 17 km from Zavolzhsk (the district's administrative centre), 101 km from Ivanovo (capital of Ivanovo Oblast) and 343 km from Moscow. Khokhloma is the nearest rural locality.
