= Goltsovka =

Goltsovka Гольцовка
- Village
- Location within Ivanovo Oblast Location within Russia
- Coordinates: 57°28′N 41°53′E
- Country: Russia
- Region: Ivanovo Oblast
- District: Zavolzhsky District
- Time zone: UTC+3:00

Goltsovka (Russian: Гольцовка) is a rural locality (a village) in Zavolzhsky District, Ivanovo Oblast, Russia. Population: 152 (2010 census);

== Geography ==
This rural locality is located 14 km from Zavolzhsk (the district's administrative centre), 77 km from Ivanovo (capital of Ivanovo Oblast) and 319 km from Moscow. Gorodishche is the nearest rural locality.
