= Markushi =

Markushi Маркуши
- Village
- Location within Ivanovo Oblast Location within Russia
- Coordinates: 57°33′N 42°11′E
- Country: Russia
- Region: Ivanovo Oblast
- District: Zavolzhsky District
- Time zone: UTC+3:00

Markushi (Russian: Маркуши) is a rural locality (a village) in Zavolzhsky District, Ivanovo Oblast, Russia. Population: 5 (2010 census);

== Geography ==
This rural locality is located 9 km from Zavolzhsk (the district's administrative centre), 97 km from Ivanovo (capital of Ivanovo Oblast) and 339 km from Moscow. Khudyaki is the nearest rural locality.
