= Borshchevka, Zavolzhsky District, Ivanovo Oblast =

Borshchevka Борщевка
- Village
- Location within Ivanovo Oblast Location within Russia
- Coordinates: 57°26′N 41°40′E
- Country: Russia
- Region: Ivanovo Oblast
- District: Zavolzhsky District
- Time zone: UTC+3:00

Borshchevka (Russian: Борщевка) is a rural locality (a village) in Zavolzhsky District, Ivanovo Oblast, Russia. Population: 12 (2010 census);

== Geography ==
This rural locality is located 28 km from Zavolzhsk (the district's administrative centre), 66 km from Ivanovo (capital of Ivanovo Oblast) and 307 km from Moscow. Fominskoye is the nearest rural locality.
