= Kornilovo, Ivanovo Oblast =

Kornilovo Корнилово
- Village
- Location within Ivanovo Oblast Location within Russia
- Coordinates: 57°34′N 41°53′E
- Country: Russia
- Region: Ivanovo Oblast
- District: Zavolzhsky District
- Time zone: UTC+3:00

Kornilovo (Russian: Корнилово) is a rural locality (a village) in Zavolzhsky District, Ivanovo Oblast, Russia. Population: 121 (2010 census);

== Geography ==
This rural locality is located 18 km from Zavolzhsk (the district's administrative centre), 86 km from Ivanovo (capital of Ivanovo Oblast) and 326 km from Moscow. Vyushkovo is the nearest rural locality.
