= Podelovo =

Podelovo Поделово
- Village
- Location within Ivanovo Oblast Location within Russia
- Coordinates: 57°38′N 41°43′E
- Country: Russia
- Region: Ivanovo Oblast
- District: Zavolzhsky District
- Time zone: UTC+3:00

Podelovo (Russian: Поделово) is a rural locality (a village) in Zavolzhsky District, Ivanovo Oblast, Russia. Population: 8 (2010 census);

== Geography ==
This rural locality is located 30 km from Zavolzhsk (the district's administrative centre), 85 km from Ivanovo (capital of Ivanovo Oblast) and 322 km from Moscow. Lykovo is the nearest rural locality.
