= Kineshma Bridge =

Bridge in Ivanovo, Russia

Kineshma Bridge Кинешемский мост
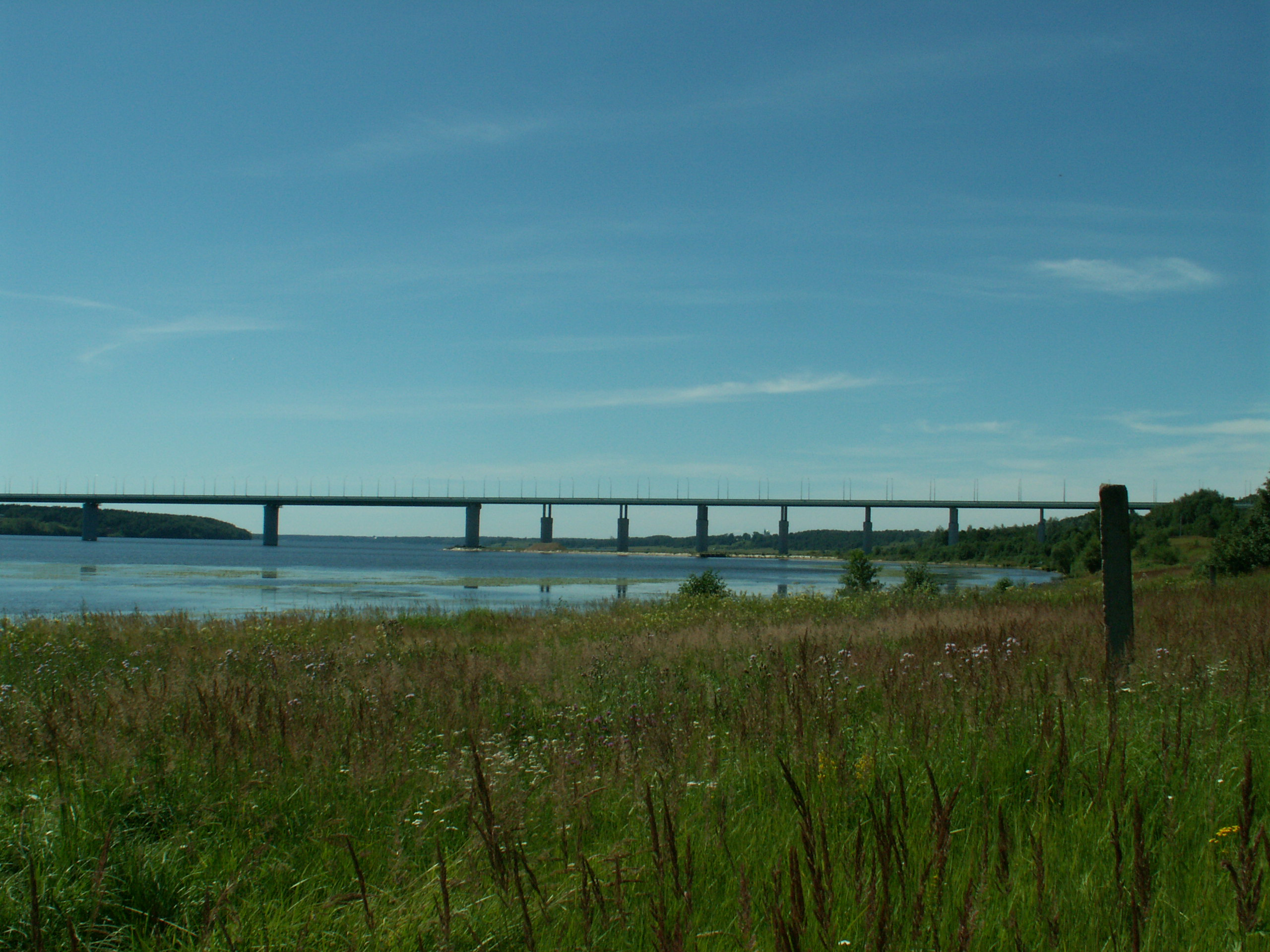
- Kineshemsky Bridge from Porozovo
- Coordinates: 57°29′30″N 42°4′32″E
- Crosses: Volga River

Characteristics
- Total length: 1640
- Width: 21.43

History
- Opened: November 15, 2003

Kineshemsky Bridge (Russian: Кинешемский мост) is a bridge across the Volga River. It is located in Ivanovo Oblast, near Kineshma and Zavolzhsk. It is a part of Highway Kineshma-Kostroma. It connects the Trans-Volga region to the Zavolzhsky District, Ivanovo Oblast Pedestrians are prohibited from using the bridge. The total length of the bridge is 1.64 km (1 Mile).

== History ==
Bridge construction (1980s)
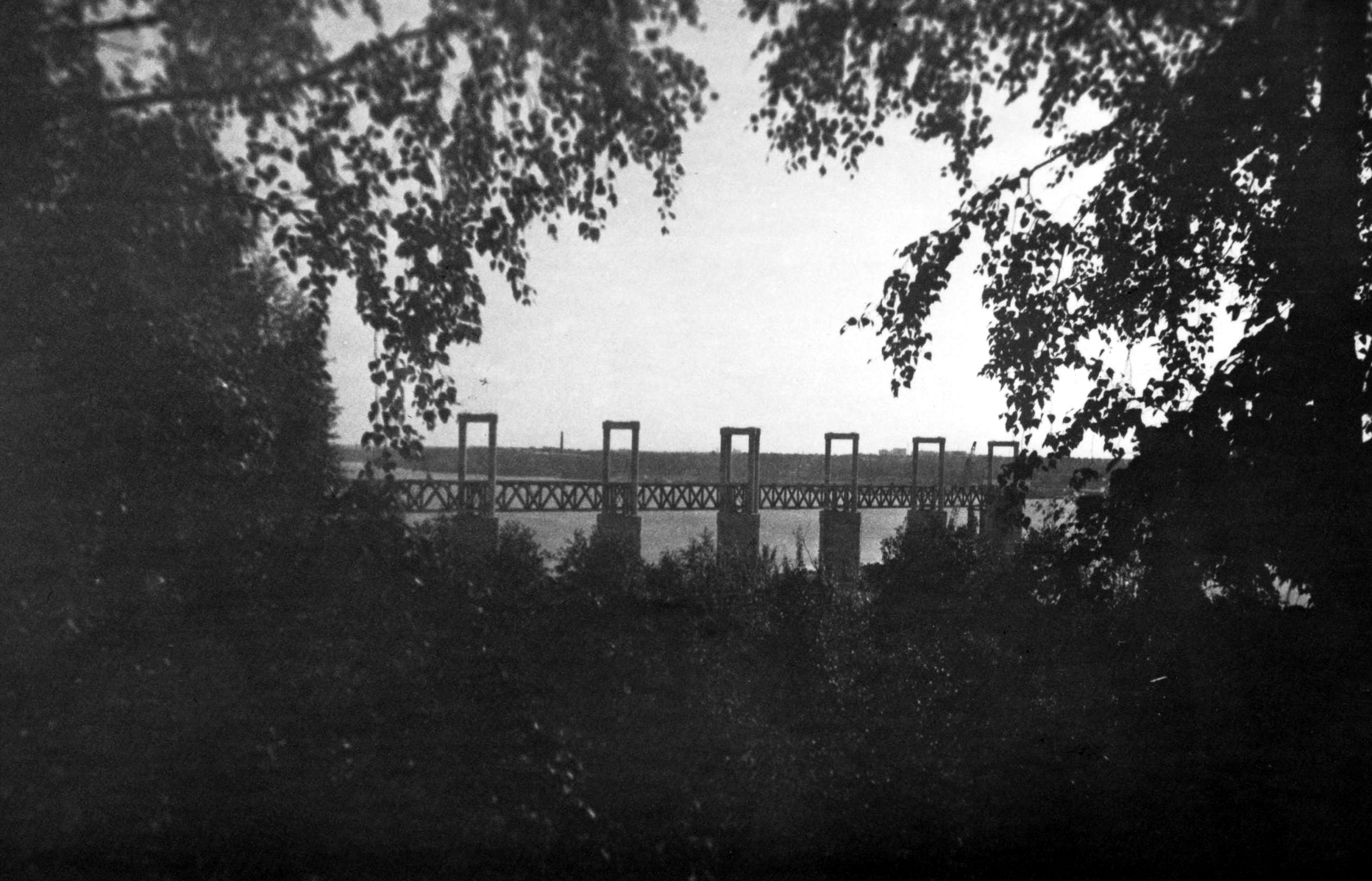

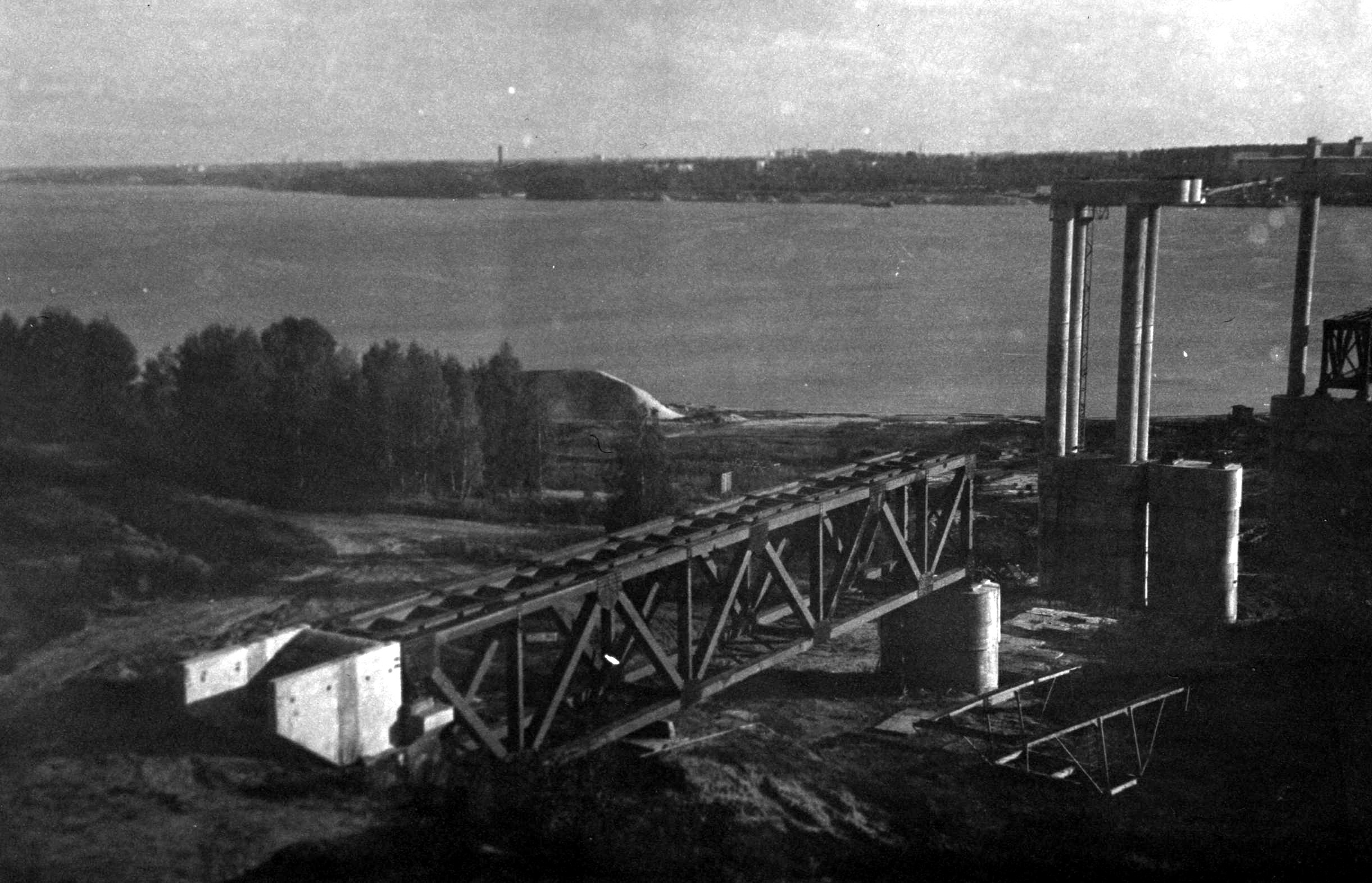

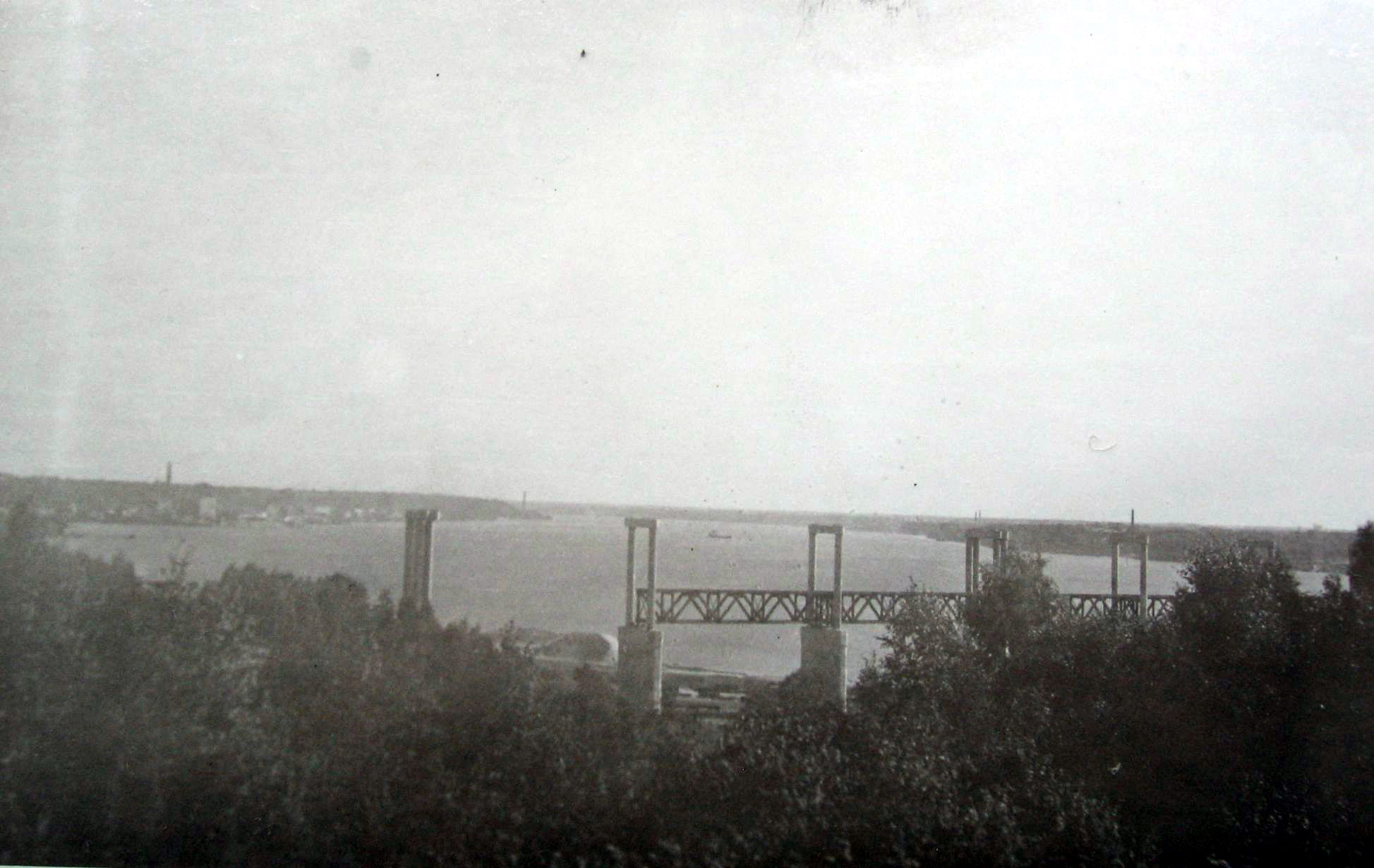
