= Porozovo, Ivanovo Oblast =

Porozovo
- Interactive map of Porozovo
- Coordinates: 57°29′00″N 42°06′00″E
- Country: Russia
- Oblast: Ivanovo
- District: Zavolzhsky
- Elevation: 130 m (430 ft)

Population (2002)
  - Total: about 100
- Time zone: UTC+3 (MSK)

Porozovo (Russian: Порозово) is a village in the Zavolzhsky District, Ivanovo Oblast, Russia, Population: about 100 (2002 est.);

== Geography ==
Located on the left bank of the river Volga. Nearby locations: Zavolzhsk, Boristsevo, Vozdvizhenie, Yablonka. The direct bus service to Zavolzhsk, from Vozdvizhenie.

== Gallery ==
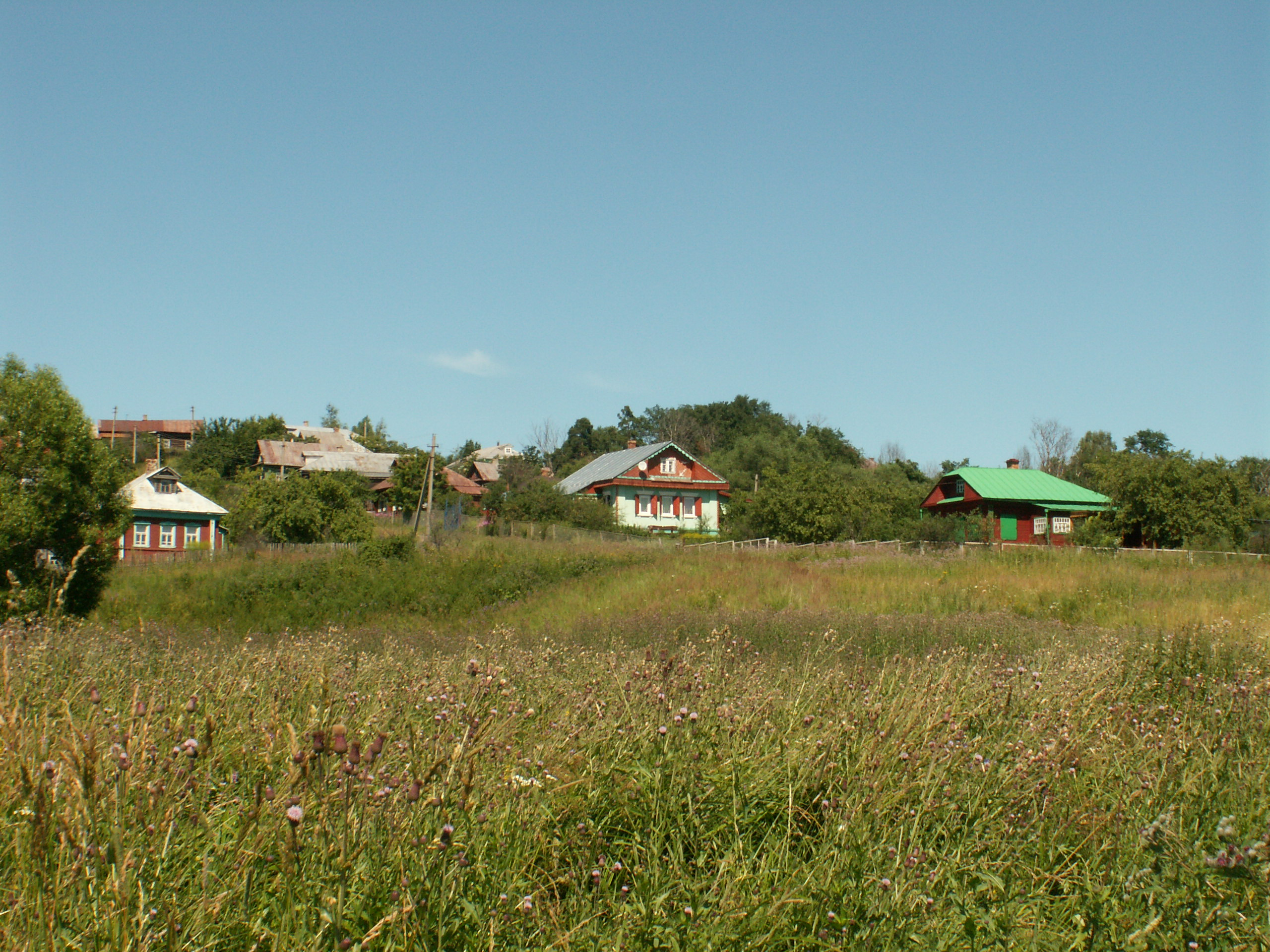
View from the river

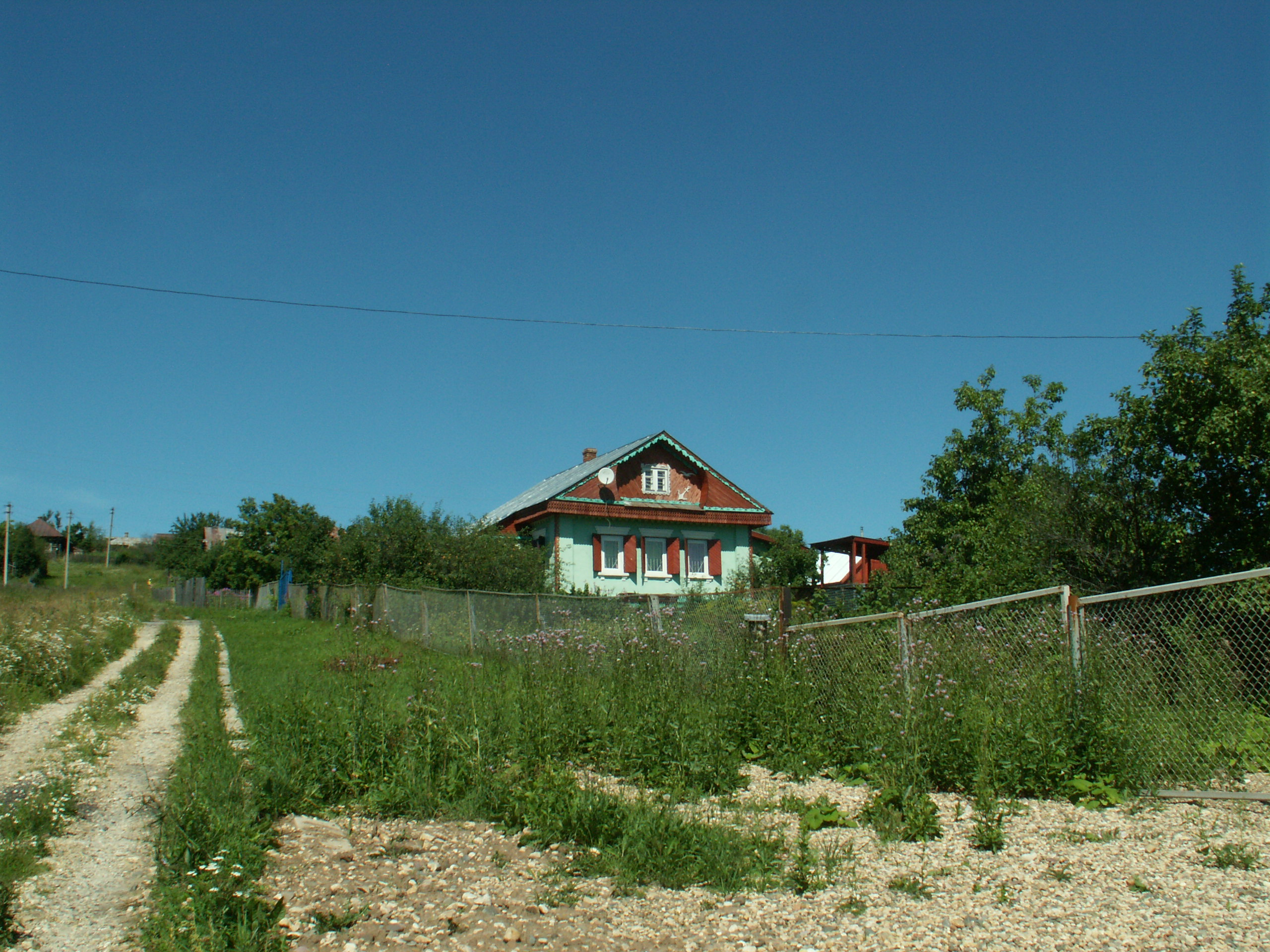
House

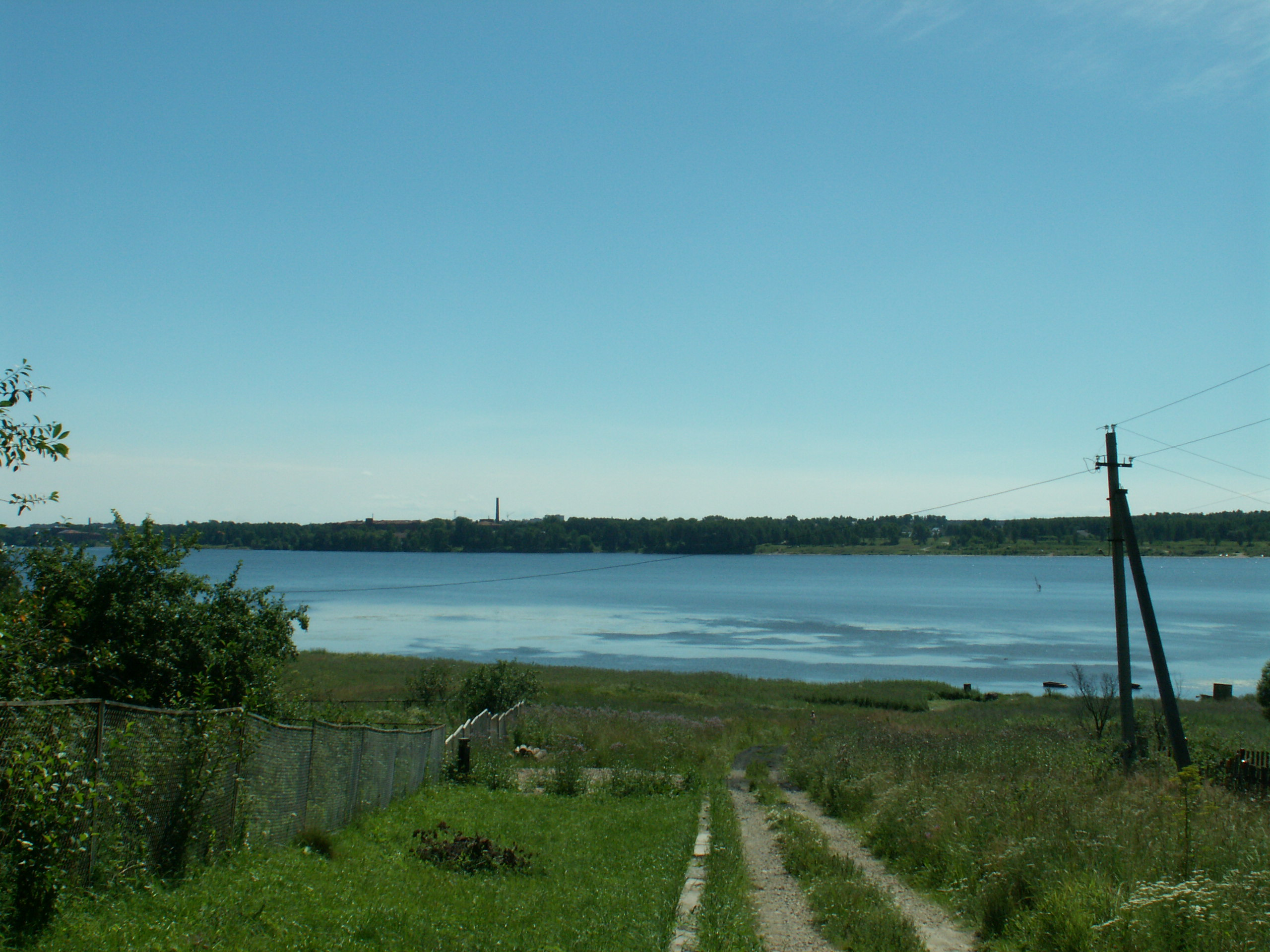
View on the river

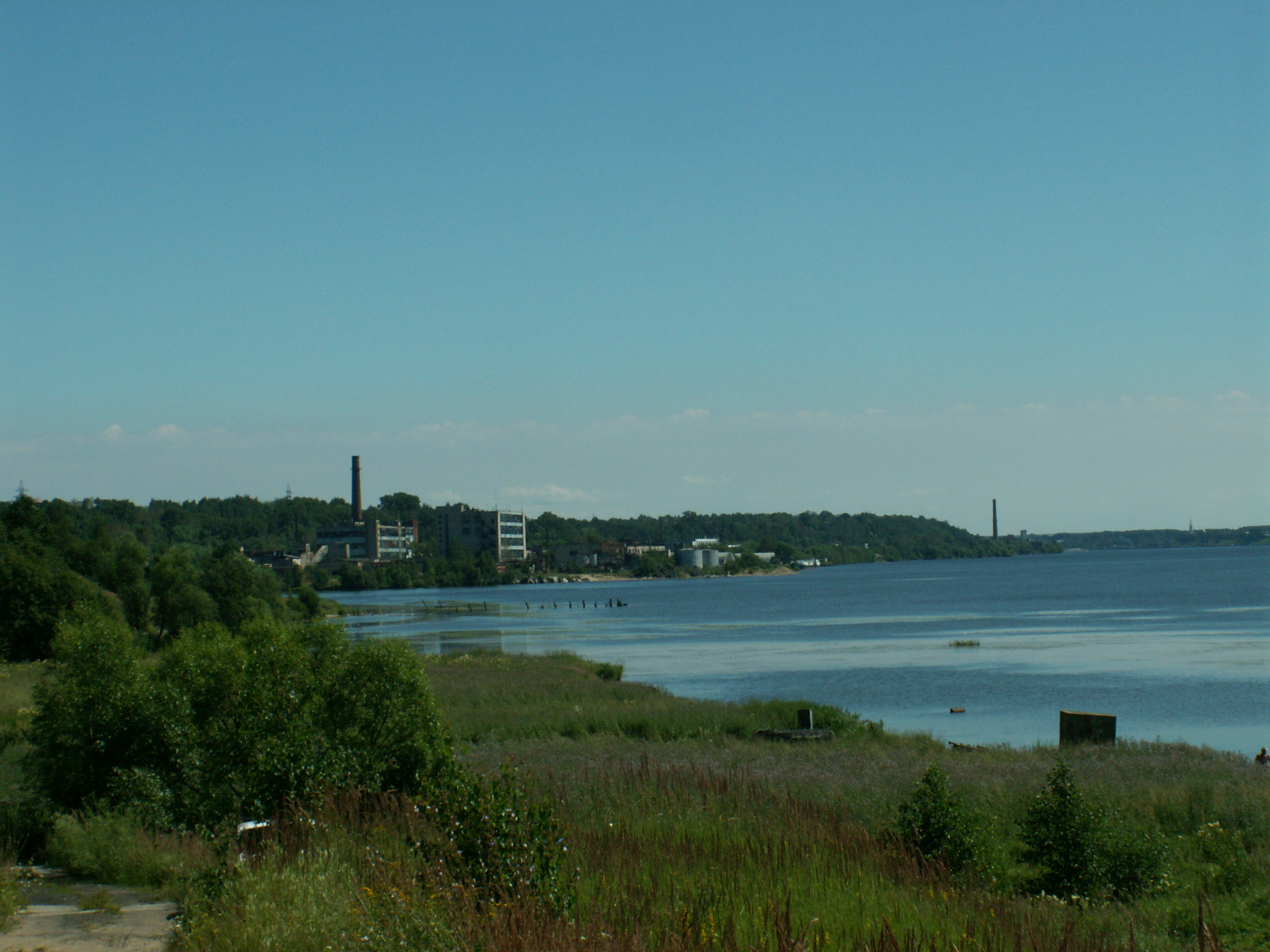
Coast of Volga

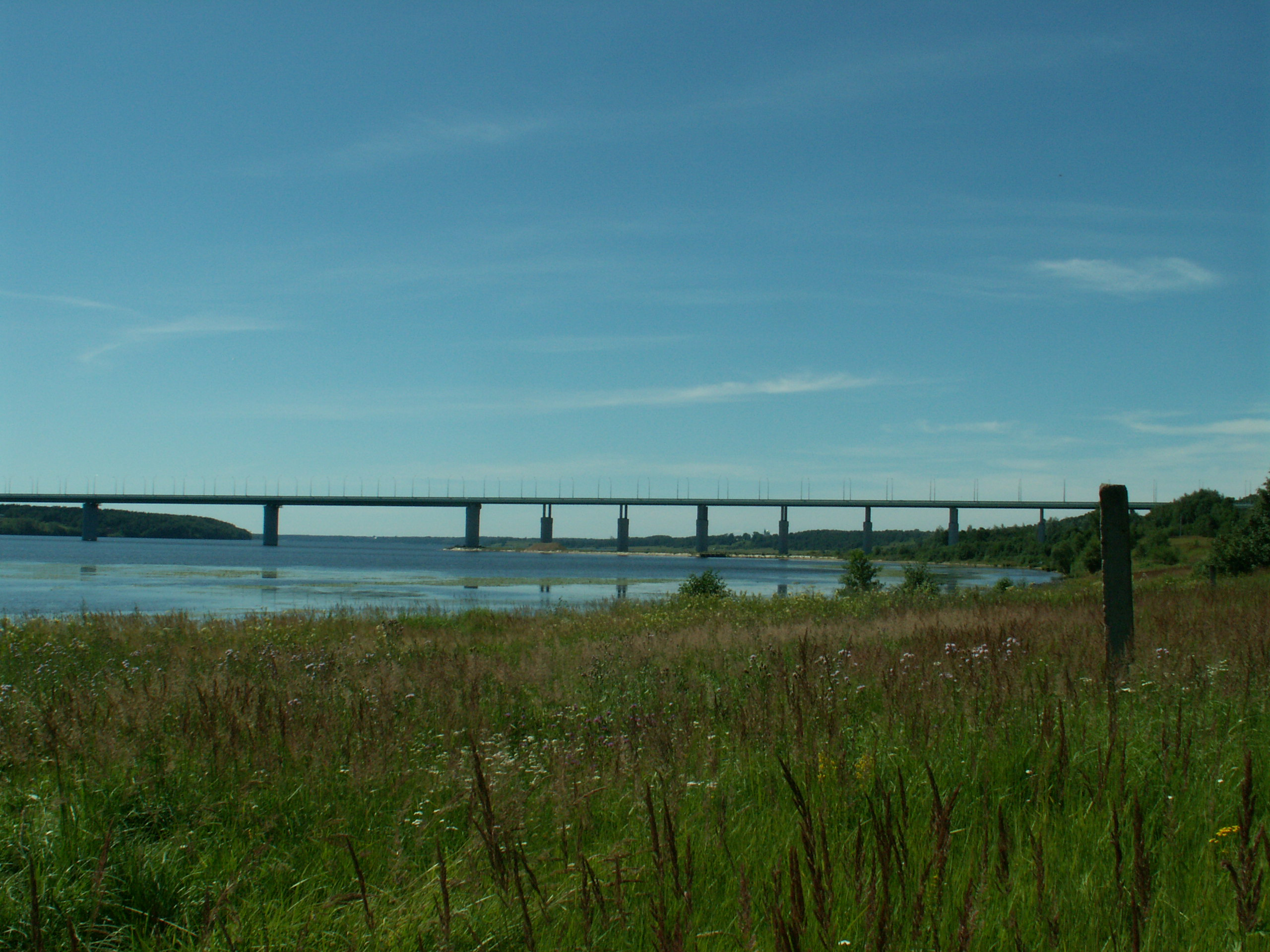
Kineshemsky Bridge
