= Donegal Daily =

Irish news website

- Website type: News website
- Available in: English
- Website: donegaldaily.com

Donegal Daily is a news website based in County Donegal, north-west Ireland. The sports editor is Chris McNulty, who also edits the related Donegal Sport Hub website.

Other websites have cited Donegal Daily as a source, as have several newspapers and RTÉ.

== Donegal Sport Hub ==
Donegal Sport Hub, a related website focusing on sport, was launched in July 2015. It features contributions from Charlie Collins (who previously worked with Highland Radio), journalist Alan Foley (who worked with the Donegal Democrat) and journalist Chris McNulty (who worked with the Donegal News).

The website has been cited as a source by other sites, by newspapers, and by broadcasters BBC and RTÉ. It was shortlisted for "Best Digital Initiative" at the FAI Communications Awards in 2017.
