= Zavolzhsk =

Town in Ivanovo Oblast, Russia

Zavolzhsk Заволжск
- Town
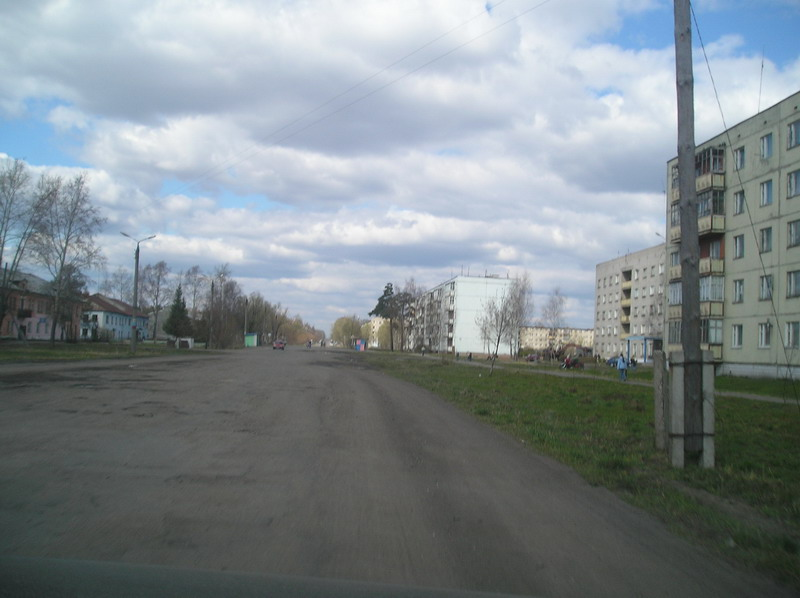
- Mira Street in Zavolzhsk

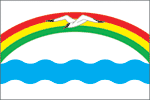
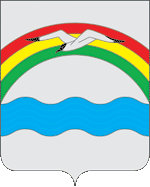
- Flag Coat of arms
- Interactive map of Zavolzhsk
- Location of Zavolzhsk Zavolzhsk (Ivanovo Oblast)
- Coordinates: 57°28′N 42°09′E
- Country: Russia
- Federal subject: Ivanovo Oblast
- Administrative district: Zavolzhsky District
- Founded: 1934
- Town status since: October 4, 1954
- Elevation: 120 m (390 ft)

Population (2010 Census)
  - Total: 12,045
  - Estimate (2021): 8,896 (−26.1%)

Administrative status
  - Capital of: Zavolzhsky District

Municipal status
  - Municipal district: Zavolzhsky Municipal District
  - Urban settlement: Zavolzhskoye Urban Settlement
  - Capital of: Zavolzhsky Municipal District, Zavolzhskoye Urban Settlement
- Time zone: UTC+3 (MSK)
- Postal codes: 155410, 155412
- OKTMO ID: 24605101001
- Website: www.zavgoradm37.ru

Zavolzhsk (Russian: Заво́лжск) is a town and the administrative center of Zavolzhsky District in Ivanovo Oblast, Russia, located on the left bank of the Volga River, opposite Kineshma, and 113 kilometers (70 mi) northeast of Ivanovo, the administrative center of the oblast. It is one of the towns of the Golden Ring. Population: 8,896 (2021 census); 12,045 (2010 census); 13,455 (2002 census); 16,530 (1989 Soviet census).

== History ==
It was established in 1934 as an urban-type settlement of Zavolzhye, conglomerated from several industrial settlements. It was granted town status and renamed on October 4, 1954.

== Administrative and municipal status ==
Within the framework of administrative divisions, Zavolzhsk serves as the administrative center of Zavolzhsky District, to which it is directly subordinated. Prior to the adoption of the Law #145-OZ On the Administrative-Territorial Division of Ivanovo Oblast in December 2010, it used to be incorporated separately as an administrative unit with the status equal to that of the districts.

As a municipal division, the town of Zavolzhsk is incorporated within Zavolzhsky Municipal District as Zavolzhskoye Urban Settlement.

== See also ==
- Kineshma Bridge
