= Zavolzhsky District, Ivanovo Oblast =

Zavolzhsky District Заволжский район (Russian)
- District
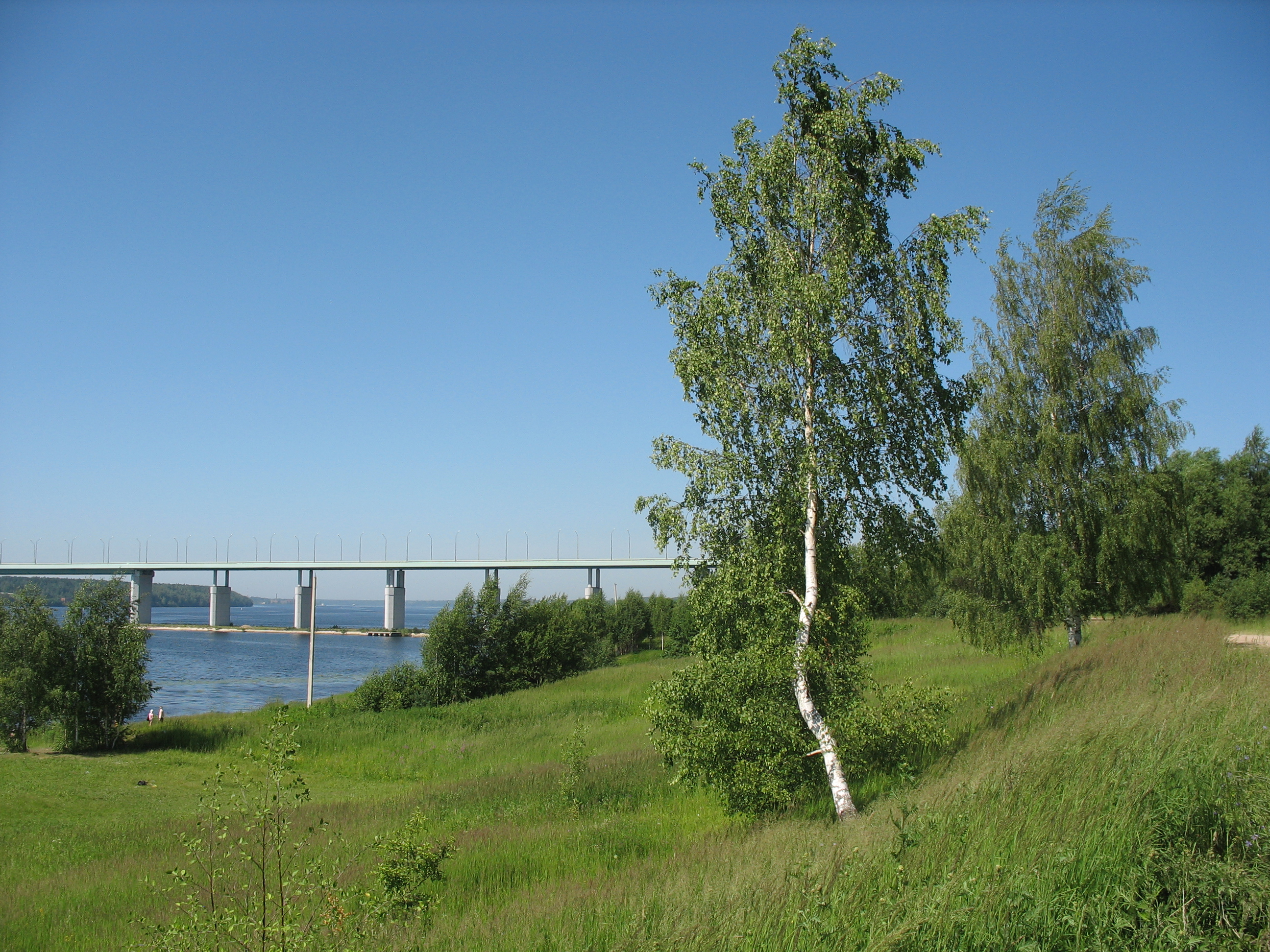
- By the Volga River, Zavolzhsky District

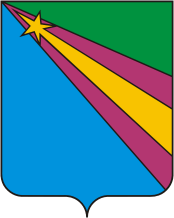
- Flag Coat of arms
- Location of Zavolzhsky District in Ivanovo Oblast
- Coordinates: 57°28′36″N 42°08′42″E
- Country: Russia
- Federal subject: Ivanovo Oblast
- Administrative center: Zavolzhsk

Area
  - Total: 1,140 km^{2} (440 sq mi)

Population (2010 Census)
  - Total: 18,468
  - Density: 16.2/km^{2} (42.0/sq mi)
  - Urban: 65.2%
  - Rural: 34.8%

Administrative structure
  - Inhabited localities: 1 cities/towns, 163 rural localities

Municipal structure
  - Municipally incorporated as: Zavolzhsky Municipal District
  - Municipal divisions: 1 urban settlements, 4 rural settlements
- Time zone: UTC+3 (MSK)
- OKTMO ID: 24605000
- Website: http://zavrayadm.nubex.ru/

Zavolzhsky District (Russian: Заво́лжский райо́н) is an administrative and municipal district (raion), one of the twenty-one in Ivanovo Oblast, Russia. It is located in the north of the oblast. The area of the district is 1,140 square kilometers (440 sq mi). Its administrative center is the town of Zavolzhsk. Population: 12,914 (2021 census); 18,468 (2010 census); 22,039 (2002 Census); 28,572 (1989 Soviet census). The population of Zavolzhsk accounts for 68.9% of the district's total population.

== Administrative and municipal status ==
The town of Zavolzhsk serves as the administrative center of the district. Prior to the adoption of the Law #145-OZ On the Administrative-Territorial Division of Ivanovo Oblast in December 2010, it was administratively incorporated separately from the district. Municipally, Zavolzhsk is incorporated within Zavolzhsky Municipal District as Zavolzhskoye Urban Settlement.
