= Energy law =

Law governing the use and taxation of energy

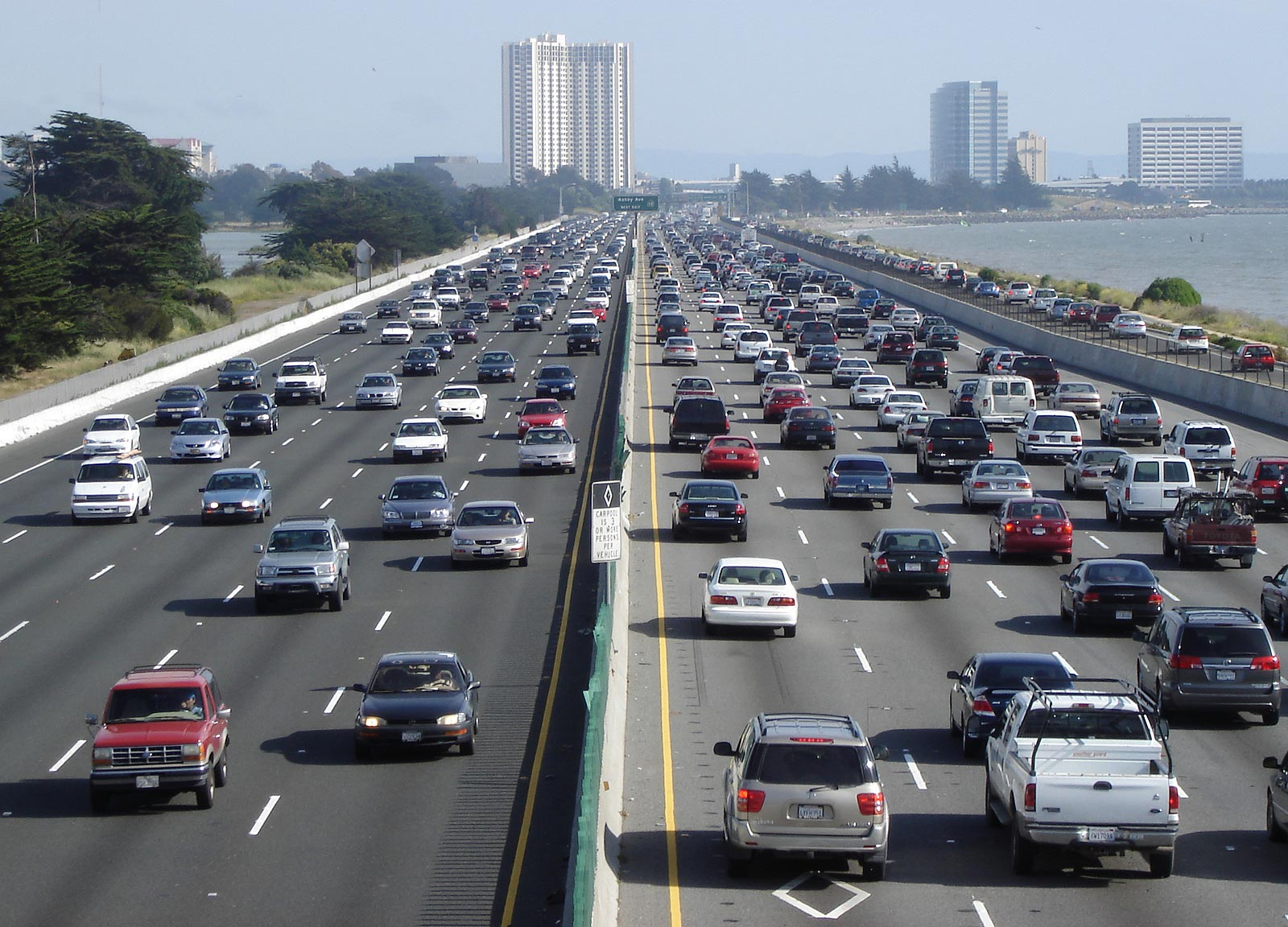
Gasoline is subject to regulation and taxation around the world.

Energy laws govern the use and taxation of energy, both renewable and non-renewable. These laws are the primary authorities (such as caselaw, statutes, rules, regulations and edicts) related to energy. In contrast, energy policy refers to the policy and politics of energy.

Energy law includes the legal provision for oil, gasoline, and "extraction taxes." The practice of energy law includes Oil and gas agreements and other contracts for siting, extraction, licenses for the acquisition and ownership rights in oil and gas both under the soil before discovery and after its capture, and adjudication regarding those rights.

== International law ==
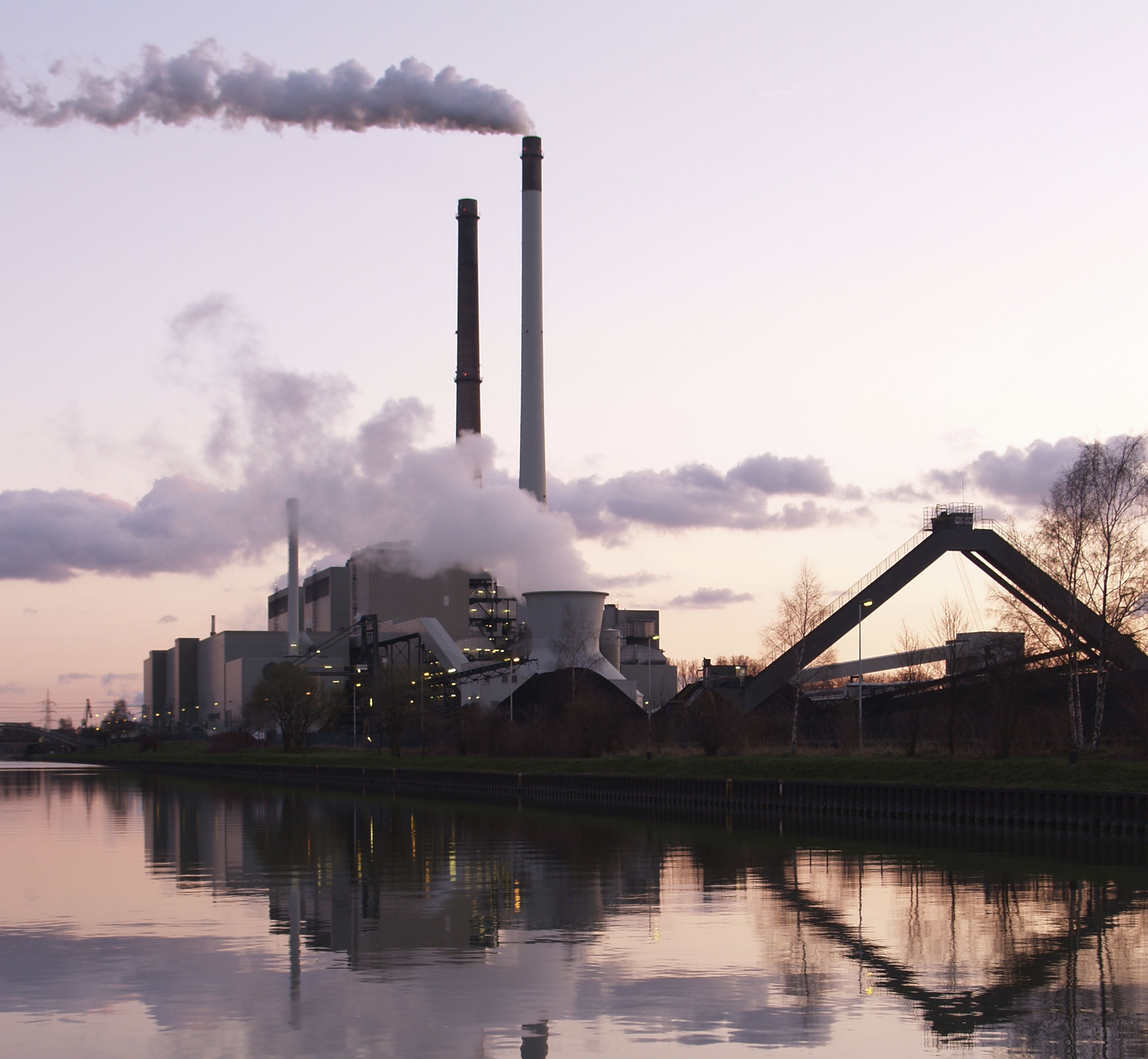
A coal power plant in Germany. Due to emissions trading, coal may become less competitive as a fuel.

There is a growing academic interest in international energy law, including continuing legal education seminars, treatises, law reviews, and graduate courses. In the same line, there has been growing interest on energy-specific issues and their particular relation with international trade and connected organizations like the World Trade Organization.

There are also periodic international meetings such as the World Forum on Energy Regulation.

== Africa ==
The Regional Association of Energy Regulators for Eastern and Southern Africa is an international nonprofit organization dedicated to promoting cooperation between the various countries on energy law, policy, and development.

=== Egypt ===
Egypt's Energy in Egypt is regulated by The Ministry of Electricity and Renewable Energy of Egypt, which is the government ministry in charge of managing and regulating the generation, transmission, and distribution of electricity in Egypt. Its headquarters are in Cairo. The current minister as of 2020 is Mohamed Shaker. The ministry was established in 1964 with presidential decree No. 147. The famous Aswan High Dam, which produces electricity, is government owned and regulated; its construction required the removal of Abu Simbel temples and the Temple of Dendur. Egypt has established a separate power authority to build and operate a nuclear power plant.

=== Ghana ===
Ghana has a regulatory body over energy, the Energy Commission.

=== Nigeria ===
Nigeria's government owns the Nigerian National Petroleum Corporation. The Lagos Business School has a number of academic offerings related to the legal, economic, and business management of energy, particularly oil and petroleum, which is a major sector in Nigeria's economic sector. Nigeria heavily subsidies petrol, which mainly benefits rich people. On 1 January 2012, the Nigerian government headed by president Goodluck Ebele Jonathan, tried to cease the subsidy on petrol and deregulate the oil prices by announcing the new price for petrol as US$0.88/litre from the old subsidised price of US$0.406/litre (LAGOS), which in areas distant from Lagos petrol was priced at US$1.25/litre. This led to the longest general strike (eight days), riots, Arab spring like protests and on 16 January 2012 the government capitulated by announcing a new price of US$0.60/litre with an envisaged price of US$2.0/litre in distant areas. In May 2016 the Buhari administration increased fuel prices again to NGN 145 per litre ($0.43 at black market rates for the currency). In September 2020, the government had announced an increase in the pump price of petrol to NGN 151.56 per litre from NGN 148.

=== Uganda ===
Uganda has adopted a new nuclear power law, which it hopes "will boost technical cooperation between the country and the International Atomic Energy Agency," according to "a senior agency official" from that African country.

== Australia ==
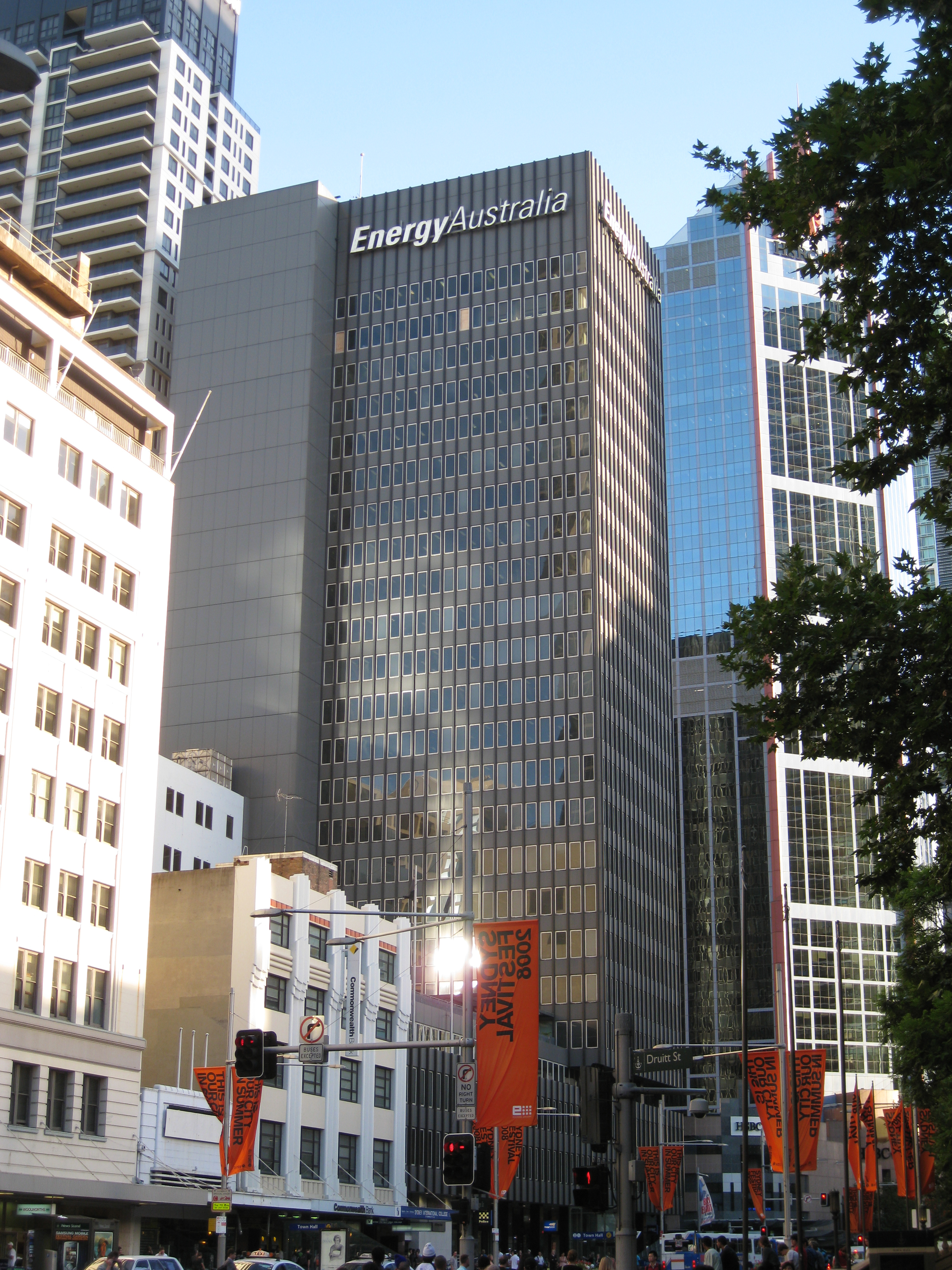
The Energy Australia Building in Sydney

Energy is big business in Australia. Australian Energy Producers represents 98% of the oil and gas producers in Australia. The main regulator is the Australian Atomic Energy Commission.

== Bangladesh ==
The article above lists all the government-controlled corporations of Bangladesh.

== Canada ==
Canada has an extensive energy law, both through the federation and the provinces, especially Alberta. These include:

- Alternative Fuels Act ( 1995, c. 20 )
- Cooperative Energy Act ( 1980-81-82-83, c. 108 )
- Energy Administration Act ( R.S., 1985, c. E-6 )
- Energy Monitoring Act ( R.S., 1985, c. E-8 )
- Nuclear Energy Act ( R.S., 1985, c. A-16 )
- Canada Oil and Gas Operations Act ( R.S., 1985, c. O-7 )
- Canada Petroleum Resources Act ( 1985, c. 36 (2nd Supp.) )
- National Energy Board Act ( R.S., 1985, c. N-7 )
- Electricity and Gas Inspection Act ( R.S., 1985, c. E-4 )

There is some academic interest in the energy law of Canada, with looseleaf periodical services, monographs, and consultation with lawyers specializing in that practice, available.

The Supreme Court of Canada has had issued some Canadian energy case law.

Canada's energy laws are so extensive and complicated in large part because of its government-owned energy resources:

The oil sands are gold not only for the oil companies, but also for Alberta's provincial government, which owns the mineral rights to virtually all the land and has encouraged the industry for three-quarters of a century.

— Robert Kunzig, National Geographic, March 2009, p. 49 (emphasis in original)

Canada and the Quebec province also own extensive hydroelectric dam facilities, which have generated not only power but controversy.

== European Union ==
European energy law has been focused on the legal mechanisms for managing short-term disruptions to the continent's energy supply, such as Germany's 1974 Law to Secure the Energy Supply. The European integrated hydrogen project was a European Union project to integrate United Nations Economic Commission for Europe (ECE) guidelines and create a basis of ECE regulation of hydrogen vehicles and the necessary infrastructure replacing national legislation and regulations. The aim of this project was enhancing of the safety of hydrogen vehicles and harmonizing their licensing and approval process.

Five nations have created the EurObserv'ER energy consortium. The EU has also created an Energy Community to extend their policies into Southeastern Europe. Austuraiu hosts the annual World Sustainable Energy Days.

The EU regulates motor vehicle emissions; see Directive 80/1269/EEC.

=== Germany ===
Germany's renewable energy law, the German Renewable Energy Sources Act, mandates the use of renewable energy through its taxes and tariffs. It promotes the development of renewable energy sources via a system of feed-in tariffs. It regulates the amount of energy generated by the producer and the type of renewable energy source. It also creates an incentive to encourage technological advancements and costs. The results have been startling: on 6 June 2014, more than half of the nation's energy used on that date came from solar power. Despite regulatory processes adding more renewable energy to its energy mix, Germany's electric grid has become more reliable, not less.

The German government has proposed abandoning "its planned phase-out of nuclear energy to help rein in surging electricity prices and protect the environment, according to proposals drawn up by an energy task force under Economy Minister Michael Glos." The German Green Party has opposed nuclear energy, as well as the market power of German utilities, claiming the "energy shortfall" has been artificially created.

There is significant academic interest in German energy law. A chart summarizing German energy legislation is available.

=== Italy ===
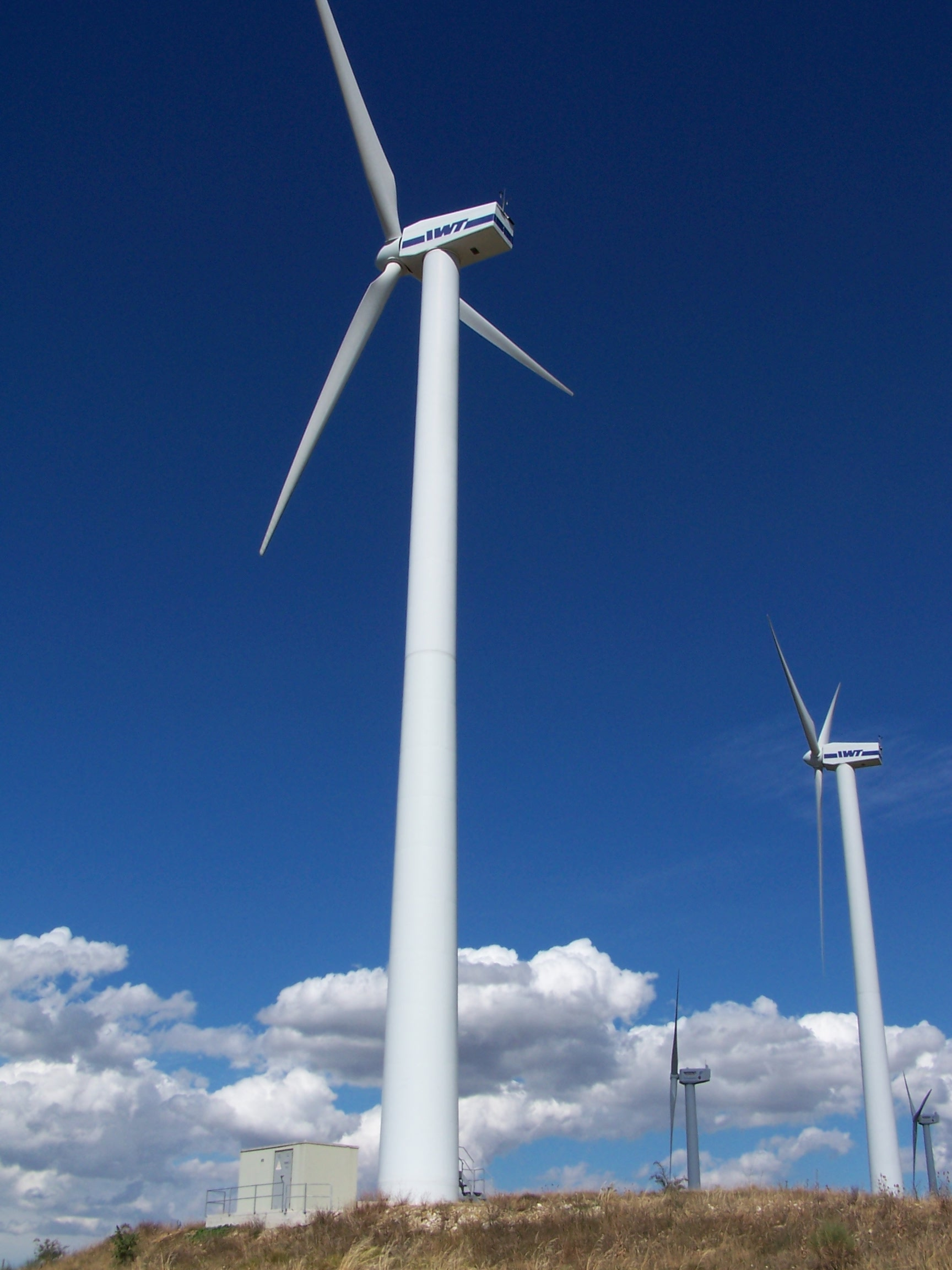
Wind turbines in Campania

Italy has few natural resources. lacking substantial deposits of iron, coal, or oil. Proven natural gas reserves, mainly in the Po Valley and offshore Adriatic, constitute the country's most important mineral resource. More than 80% of the country's energy sources are imported. The energy sector is highly dependent on imports from abroad: in 2006 the country imported more than 86% of its total energy consumption.

In the last decade, Italy has become one of the world's largest producers of renewable energy, ranking as the world's fifth largest solar energy producer in 2009 and the sixth largest producer of wind power in 2008.

In 1987, after the Chernobyl disaster, a large majority of Italians passed a referendum opting for phasing out nuclear power. The government responded by closing existing nuclear power plants and completely putting a halt to the national nuclear program. Italy also imports about 16% of its electricity need from France for 6.5 GWe, which makes it the world's biggest importer of electricity. Due to its reliance on expensive fossil fuels and imports, Italians pay approximately 45% more than the EU average for electricity.

In 2004, a new Energy Law brought the possibility of joint ventures with foreign companies to build nuclear power plants and import electricity. In 2005, Italy's power company, ENEL made an agreement with Electricite de France for 200 MWe from a nuclear reactor in France and potentially an additional 1,000 MWe from new construction. As part of the agreement, ENEL received a 12.5% stake in the project and direct involvement in design, construction, and operation of the plants. In another move, ENEL also bought 66% of the Slovak Electric utility that operates six nuclear reactors. As part of this agreement, ENEL will pay the Slovak government EUR 1.6 billion to complete a nuclear power plant in Mochovce, which has a gross output of 942 MWe. With these agreements, Italy has managed to access nuclear power without placing reactors on Italian territory.

=== Lithuania ===
The nation of Lithuania has an energy law, Energetikos teisė.

=== Ukraine ===
In Ukraine, renewable energy projects are supported by a feed-in tariff system. The law of Ukraine "On alternative sources of energy" refers to alternative energy sources: solar, wind, geothermal, hydrothermal, marine and hydrokinetic energy, hydroelectricity, biomass, landfill biogas and others. Ukrainian National Energy and Utilities Regulatory Commission and State Agency on Energy Efficiency and Energy Saving of Ukraine are the main renewable energy regulation authorities. Reforms have been made by Ukrainian government in alternative energy sphere. There is a need of energy savings services in Ukraine. Its potential reaches about 5 billion EUR only in state-owned buildings.

Ukraine has a separate regulatory agency to manage the Chernobyl Exclusion Zone.

== Other European countries ==
Albania has an established the Albanian Institute of Oil and Gas.

There is significant geothermal power in Iceland; about 80% of the nation's energy needs are met by geothermal sources, all of which is owned by the government, or regulated by it.

Switzerland incorporated a company, Grande Dixence SA, to manage their Hydroelectric power.

== Iraq ==
The Iraqi Oil Ministry awards contracts to only a few companies. These contracts are called Production sharing agreements. As of July 2014, there are 23 established oil companies, but only 17 banking corporations in Iraq.

== Israel ==
The Israel Energy Sources Law, 5750-1989 ("Energy Law"), defines what is considered as "energy" and "energy source" and its purpose is to regulate the exploitation of energy sources whilst ensuring the efficiently of its use. Under the Energy Law, certain regulation methods of measurement have been nominated by the Israel legislature in order to regulate the efficiency of the use of the energy source. In addition to which entity shall be entitled to the pursuit and use of such sources.

Furthermore, in Israel there are certain additional laws that deal with the use of energy sources, such as the Natural Gas Sector Law, 5762-2002 which provides the conditions for the development of the natural gas sphere in Israel, and the Electricity Sector Law, 5756–1996, which established the "Public Utility Authority – Electricity" which publishes directives and regulations for the use of renewable electricity sources, including solar energy and hydro-energy.

== Japan ==
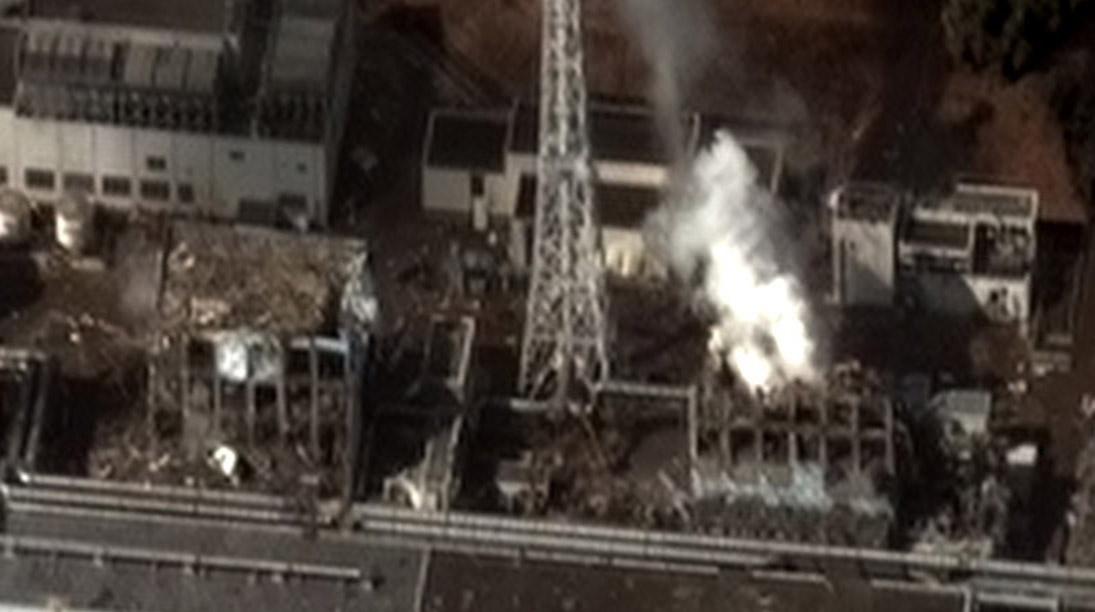
The 2011 Fukushima Daiichi nuclear disaster, the world's worst nuclear accident since 1986, displaced 50,000 households after radiation leaked into the air, soil and sea. Radiation checks led to bans of some shipments of vegetables and fish.

Prior to the earthquake and tsunami of March 2011, and the nuclear disasters that resulted from it, Japan generated 30% of its electrical power from nuclear reactors and planned to increase that share to 40%.

Nuclear energy was a national strategic priority in Japan, but there had been concern about the ability of Japan's nuclear plants to withstand seismic activity. The Kashiwazaki-Kariwa Nuclear Power Plant was completely shut down for 21 months following an earthquake in 2007.

The 2011 earthquake and tsunami caused the failure of cooling systems at the Fukushima I Nuclear Power Plant on March 11 and a nuclear emergency was declared. 140,000 residents were evacuated. The total amount of radioactive material released is unclear, as the crisis is ongoing. On 6 May 2011, Prime Minister Naoto Kan ordered the Hamaoka Nuclear Power Plant be shut down as an earthquake of magnitude 8.0 or higher is likely to hit the area within the next 30 years.

Problems in stabilizing the Fukushima I nuclear plant had hardened attitudes to nuclear power. As of June 2011, "more than 80 percent of Japanese now say they are anti-nuclear and distrust government information on radiation".

As of October 2011, there have been electricity shortages, but Japan survived the summer without the extensive blackouts that had been predicted. An energy white paper, approved by the Japanese Cabinet in October 2011, says "public confidence in safety of nuclear power was greatly damaged" by the Fukushima disaster, and calls for a reduction in the nation's reliance on nuclear power.

Many of Japan's nuclear plants have been closed, or their operation has been suspended for safety inspections. The last of Japan's 54 reactors (Tomari-3) went offline for maintenance on May 5, 2012., leaving Japan completely without nuclear-produced electrical power for the first time since 1970. Despite protests, on 1 July 2012 unit 3 of the Ōi Nuclear Power Plant was restarted. As of September 2012, Ōi units 3 and 4 are Japan's only operating nuclear power plants, although the city and prefecture of Osaka have requested they be shut down.

The United States-Japan Joint Nuclear Energy Action Plan is a bilateral agreement aimed at putting in place a framework for the joint research and development of nuclear energy technology, which was signed on April 18, 2007. It is believed that the agreement is the first that the US has signed to develop nuclear power technologies with another country, although Japan has agreements with Australia, Canada, China, France, and the United Kingdom. Under the plan, the United States and Japan would each conduct research into fast reactor technology, fuel cycle technology, advanced computer simulation and modeling, small and medium reactors, safeguards and physical protection; and nuclear waste management, which it to be coordinated by a joint steering committee. The treaty's progress has been in limbo since the Fukushima I nuclear accidents.

The Japan Oil, Gas and Metals National Corporation (JOGMEC) is a government-owned company involved in fossil-fuel energy exploration, amongst other activities. In 2013, its corporate workers first extracted Methane clathrate from seabed deposits.

== Malaysia ==
Malaysia heavily regulates its energy sector.

From 1982 to 1992, the Government of Sabah owned Sabah Gas Industries for the downstream operations of Sabah natural gas resources, based in Labuan, Malaysia, which was put up for privatization. Its methanol plant was sold to Petronas and operates today as Petronas Methanol (Labuan) Sdn Bhd. The power station was sold to Sabah Electricity.

== Mexico ==
Mexico had numerous laws that subsidize oil, until c. 2017. PEMEX, a government company in charge of selling oil in Mexico is subsidized by the Mexican government. This serves to quell inflationary pressures in Mexico. Mexico buys much of its gasoline and diesel from the United States and resells it at US$98 per barrel. Many residents of US border communities cross the border to buy fuel in Mexico, thereby enjoying a cheaper fuel subsidy at the expense of Mexican taxpayers. This has caused frequent supply shortages at a number of filling stations along the border for Mexican drivers, especially truck and bus drivers who use diesel.

In 2017, Mexico ended its oil industry subsidies, leading to increased prices and widespread protests throughout the country.

== Philippines ==
Philippines law has provisions concerning energy, fossil fuels, and renewable energy. Energy law in the Philippines is important because that nation is one of the fastest growing in Asia, and has over 90 million residents.

The earliest Philippine energy law dates from 1903, during the American Commonwealth, Act No. 667, concerning franchises for utilities, and Act No. 1022, which allowed such to have mortgages. A uniform law in 1929 allowed for new utilities.

The first coal mining law, known as the Coal Land Act, dates to 1917. Oil exploration was allowed in a 1920 law. The Mining Act (1936) has been amended several times by acts and decrees.

The first hydroelectric power law dates from 1933, and have been updated since, including one that created the National Power Corporation, and has been amended several times through 1967. The Renewable Energy Law (2009) encourages the development and use of non-traditional energy sources.

== Saudi Arabia ==
Saudi Arabia has some laws concerning energy, especially oil and gas law. Saudi Arabia is the largest oil producer in the world and therefore its energy law has great influence over the world's overall energy supply. Under the Basic Law of Saudi Arabia, all its oil and gas wealth belongs to the government: "All Allah's bestowed wealth, be it under the ground, on the surface or in national territorial waters, in the land or maritime domains under the state's control, are the property of the state as defined by law. The law defines means of exploiting, protecting, and developing such wealth in the interests of the state, its security, and economy." Energy taxes are also specifically allowed; Article 20 of the basic law states, "Taxes and fees are to be imposed on a basis of justice and only when the need for them arises. Imposition, amendment, revocation, and exemption are only permitted by law."

Two ministries of the Kingdom of Saudi Arabia share the responsibility of the energy sector: the Ministry of Energy and the Ministry of Water and Electricity. The country's laws have also established other agencies that have some legal powers, but are not strictly regulatory. These include Saudi Aramco, originally a joint venture between the Kingdom and the California-Arabian Standard Oil, but now wholly owned by the Kingdom, and Saudi Consolidated Electricity Companies (SCECOs).

== Sri Lanka ==
Sri Lanka’s energy law has undergone significant reforms to enhance efficiency, attract investment, and promote renewable energy. With a growing population and increasing energy demand, these reforms are critical for sustainable development.

The earliest laws governing energy in Sri Lanka include the Ceylon Electricity Board Act, No. 17 of 1969, which established the state-owned Ceylon Electricity Board (CEB) to manage electricity generation, transmission, and distribution. This act was a cornerstone in centralising the country’s electricity sector but faced criticism for inefficiencies and financial challenges.

Significant updates came with the Sri Lanka Electricity Act, No. 20 of 2009, which aimed to introduce more competition and regulatory oversight. However, it was the Sri Lanka Electricity Act, No. 36 of 2024, that marked a major overhaul of the sector. This act established the National Electricity Advisory Council and designated the Public Utilities Commission of Sri Lanka (PUCSL) as the main regulator. The 2024 Act promotes market competition, facilitates private sector investment, and encourages the use of renewable energy sources.

== Turkey ==
Turkey's old Petroleum Law was in effect for 70 years until 2013, when it enacted a new Petroleum Law, number 6491. Amongst other provisions, it extends the permissible years for drilling permits, reduces a fee, and eliminates a state monopoly.

== United Kingdom ==
The United Kingdom started the process of leaving the European community as of January 2020.

The most recent United Kingdom energy law passed is Great British Energy Act 2025.

== United States ==
This section concerns the law of the United States, as well as the states that are the most populous or largest producers of energy.

In the United States, energy is regulated extensively through the United States Department of Energy, as well as state regulatory agencies.

Every state, the Federal government, and the District of Columbia collect some motor vehicle excise taxes. Specifically, these are excise taxes on gasoline, diesel fuel, and gasohol. While many states in the western U.S. rely to a great deal on severance taxes (taxes on mineral extraction), most states get a relatively small amount of their revenue from such sources.

== See also ==
- Effects of 2000s energy crisis
- List of years in the environment

=== General energy topics ===
- Energy form
- Energy conservation
- Energy economics
- Energy conversion efficiency
- Energy markets and energy derivatives
- Hydraulic fracturing
- Induced seismicity
- List of energy topics
- World energy resources and consumption
- World oil market chronology from 2003

=== Specific laws and policies ===
- 2026 Iran war
- Atomic Energy Basic Law
- Conflict minerals law
- Correlative rights doctrine
- Cuius est solum eius est usque ad coelum et ad inferos
- Easement
- Electric bicycle laws
- Energy policy of the European Union
- Energy Charter Treaty
- Energy Star
- Energy security
- Environmental crime
- Feebate
- Feed-in Tariff
- Gasoline and diesel usage and pricing
- List of energy regulatory bodies
- List of environmental lawsuits
- Natural resources consumption tax
- Nuclear energy policy
- Nuclear labor issues
- Production sharing agreement

=== Academic think-tanks and associations ===
- Alliance to Save Energy
- Centre for Energy, Petroleum and Mineral Law and Policy
- Renewable Energy and Energy Efficiency Partnership
- RETScreen
- The Energy and Resources Institute
- Université Laval
- University of Wyoming

=== Renewable and alternative energy sources ===
- Alternative propulsion
- Clean Energy Trends
- Clean Tech Nation
- Concentrated solar power
- Efficient energy use
- Electric vehicle
- Geothermal power
- Global warming
- Green banking
- Hydro One
- Intermittent power source
- International Symposium on Alcohol Fuels
- List of renewable energy topics by country
- Ocean energy
- Passive solar building design
- Photovoltaic power station
- Plug-in hybrid
- Renewable energy commercialization
- Renewable heat
- Solar power
- Sustainable design
- The Clean Tech Revolution
- V2G

=== Awards and standards ===
- Ashden Awards
- ISO 14001
- Leadership in Energy and Environmental Design (LEED)
