= Bieudron Hydroelectric Power Station =

Power station in Valais, Switzerland

Coordinates: 46°11′7.07″N 7°14′58.42″E

The Bieudron Hydroelectric Power Station is a hydroelectric power plant located in the Swiss Alps in the Canton of Valais in Switzerland. The power plant is fed with water from the Grande Dixence Dam's reservoir, Lac des Dix and is part of the Cleuson-Dixence Complex. The 1269 MW power plant is operated by Grande Dixence SA.

Production began in 1998, with two world records set upon its completion: the world's most powerful Pelton turbine as well as the highest head used to produce hydro-electric energy. A penstock rupture in 2000 forced the closure of the power plant and it was operational again in 2010.

== Specifications ==
This facility houses three Pelton turbines, with each turbine rated at 423 MW (~567,000 HP); note that the turbine acceptance testing process reported a maximum turbine output power of 449 MW each (~602,000 HP) due to better than expected efficiency and ideal test conditions.

At the rated power of 423 MW each turbine operates at a head of ~1869 meters (6130 feet) and a flow rate of 25 cubic meters per second, with an efficiency in excess of 92% (~92.23%). The turbine assembly is a five-jet configuration; the stream of each jet is 184.7 mm (7.2716535 inches) in diameter with an exit velocity of 191.5 meters/second (628.28 ft/s). The kinetic energy of each of the 5 streams i.e. 1 from each jet) is approximately 92.16 MW (Q = 5 cubic meters per second, v = 191.5 m/s, H = 1869 m). The assembly rated pressure is 203.2 bars (2944 psi).

The combined flow rate for the three turbines is 75 cubic meters per second. The facility peak power production is ~1269 MW. The turbines and associated valves were designed and developed by VA Tech of Switzerland.

== Penstock rupture ==
On December 12, 2000, at approximately 20:10, the Cleuson-Dixence penstock, feeding the Pelton turbines at Bieudron, ruptured at ~1234 meters AMSL (under more than 1000 meters of head). The failure appears to have been due to several factors including the poor strength of rock surrounding the penstock at the rupture location. The rupture was approximately 9 m long by 60 cm wide. The flow rate through the rupture was likely well in excess of 150 m^{3}/s (5,300 cu ft/s). The ensuing rapid release of a very large quantity of high pressure water destroyed approximately 100 hectares (1 km²) of pastures, orchards, forest, as well as washing away several chalets and barns around Nendaz and Fey. Three people were killed.

The Bieudron facility was inoperative after the accident; however, it became partially operational in December 2009, and fully operational in January 2010. Much investigation went into the accident resulting in the almost complete redesign of the penstock. Legal action is still in process and the root cause of the rupture is unknown.

== Redesign ==
However details regarding the redesign are available. The redesign calls for improvements in the pipe's lining as well as the addition of grouting around the penstock to reduce water flow between the penstock and the surrounding rock due to dynamic variation of the pipe diameter during operation (it expands due to water loading during operation then contracts when the load is removed, leaving a gap). The damaged section of the penstock was rerouted around the previous location to where new (undamaged) more stable rock is available. Construction on the redesigned penstock was completed in 2009. Redesign considerations include operational control of maximum agreed design limits under all conditions of assembly, design and service conditions (including water hammer pressure spikes).

== See also ==
- Grande Dixence Dam
- List of hydroelectric power station failures
