= ISAF (disambiguation) =

ISAF may refer to:

- International Sailing Federation, former name for the world governing body for Olympic and other competitive sailing, now called World Sailing
- International Security Assistance Force, the NATO-led security mission operating in Afghanistan from 2001 to 2014
- International Shark Attack File, a global database of shark attacks set up in the 1940s, now maintained by the American Elasmobranch Society
- International Symposium on Alcohol Fuels, an international bi-annual conference on alcohol and bio-fuels, established in 1976
- Independent State Allied Forces, a fictional military group and alliance in the 2001 video game, Ace Combat 04: Shattered Skies
