= Hardeland hydroelectric power station =

Hydroelectric power station in Etne, Norway

Hardeland Hydroelectric Power Station
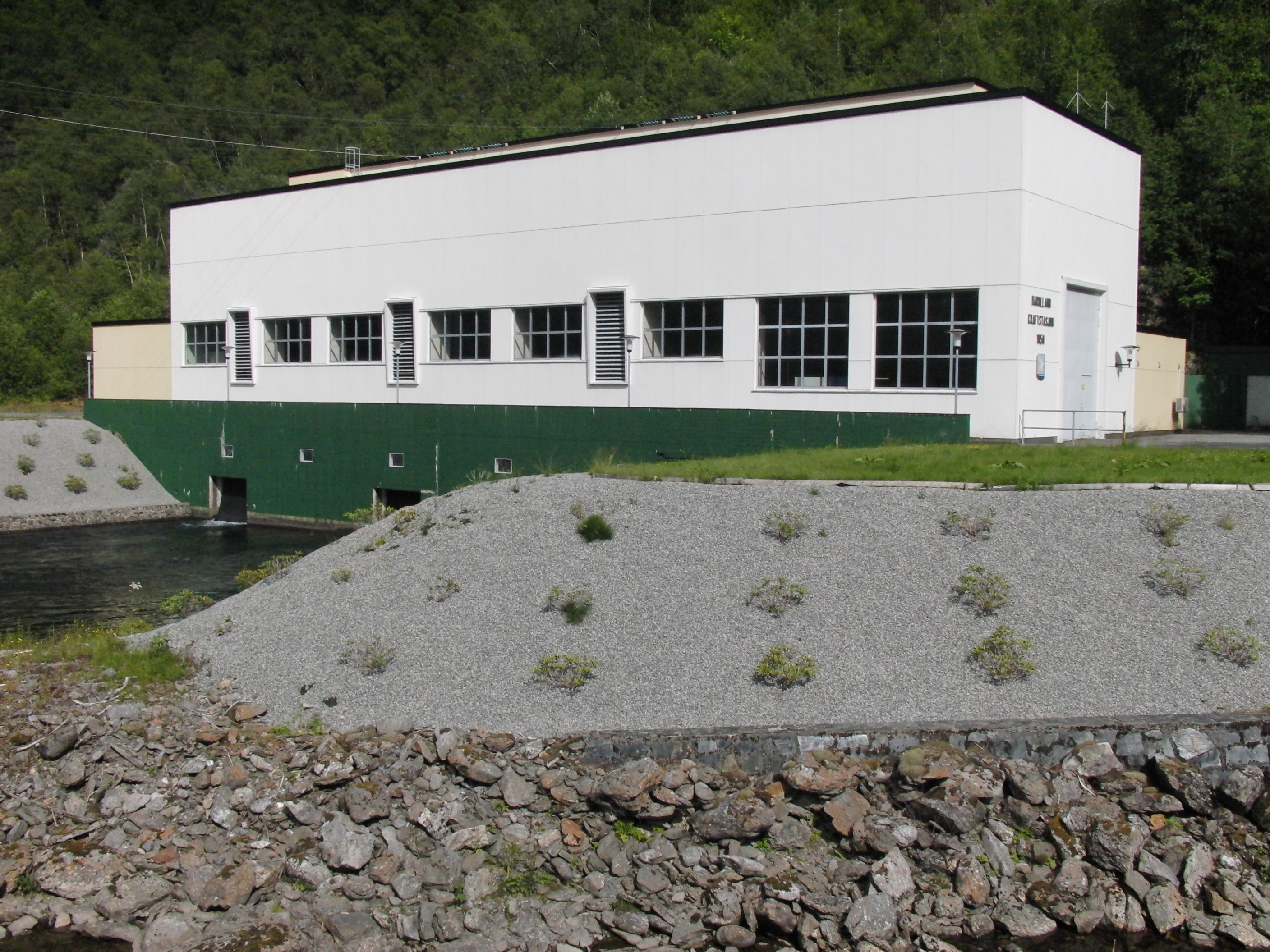
- Interactive map of Hardeland Hydroelectric Power Station
- Official name: Hardeland kraftverk
- Country: Norway
- Coordinates: 59°39′27″N 6°05′48″E
- Status: Operational
- Owner: Haugaland Kraft

Power Station
- Turbines: 3 × 14 MW
- Annual generation: 123 GW·h

Hardeland hydroelectric power station is a power plant in Etne Municipality in western Norway. The site is owned and operated by Haugaland Kraft.

The station uses water from two sets of reservoirs. Hardeland H is a 400 m vertical fall from Løkjelsvatnet, while Hardeland K uses Grindheimsvatnet, Ilsvatnet, Basurde-/Krokavatnet and Hjørnås via a 305 m fall from the Hjørnås lake.

Hardeland is connected to the grid with a 22 kV line to Litledalen. The site uses three pelton wheels with 14 MW generators, and average yearly output is 123 GWh.
