= Energiapolar =

Electricity sales company in Finland

Energiapolar Oy
- Company type: Osakeyhtiö
- Founded: Rovaniemi, Finland (1995)
- Headquarters: Rovaniemi, Finland
- Area served: Finland
- Key people: Timo Virikko, CEO
- Products: Electricity sales
- Revenue: € 60 million (2013)
- Number of employees: 7 (2013)
- Website: www.energiapolar.fi

Energiapolar Oy is one of the largest electricity sales companies in Finland. The company's main market area is Northern Finland. Energiapolar has 80 000 customers and annual revenue of EUR 60 million. Electricity sales volume was over 900 000 MWh in 2013. Energiapolar solely concentrates on electricity sales and trading while working in close co-operation with the local network companies.

Shareholders of Energiapolar are (ownership in %): Rovakaira Oy (34,21 %), Rovaniemen Energia Oy (24,34 %), Torniolaakson Sähkö Oy (17,81 %), Koillis-Lapin Sähkö Oy (15,79 %), Muonion Sähköosuuskunta (3,29 %), Enontekiön Sähkö Oy (2,63 %) and Pellon Sähkö Oy (1.93%).

== See also ==
- Energy law
