= Grande Dixence SA =

Grande Dixence S.A. is a Société Anonyme operating in Switzerland which runs the Bieudron Hydro Project and the Grande Dixence Dam in the Val d'Hérens, Valais. Grande Dixence is primarily concerned with the production of hydroelectricity by harnessing the hydropower associated with the steep changes of elevation found in the part of the Alps.

The company will "mark its 75e anniversary" in September 2025.

As part of the company's functions, it also assists scientists in researching the geology and hydrology of the Alps. From that and other studies, Uranium "deposits of some importance" have been found on their properties, and the company has entered into extraction of some ore. These ongoing studies help the company to manage their reservoirs, by "forecasting meltwater runoff," especially during the Spring melting season.

The company allows visitors to see their Grande Dixence Dam, completed in 1961 as the largest dam in Europe, which site includes a cable car, zip line, and museum.

== Shareholders ==
The company has a share capital of 300 million CHF, divided between four shareholders.

- énergie ouest suisse (eos) 60%
- Canton of Basel-City (Industrielle Werke Basel) 13 1/3 %
- BKW FMB Energie S.A. 13 1/3 %
- Forces Motrices du Nord-Est de la Suisse S.A. (Nordostschweizerische Kraftwerke) 13 1/3 %.

== See also ==
- Energy law
