= European integrated hydrogen project =

The European integrated Hydrogen Project (EIHP) was a European Union project to integrate United Nations Economic Commission for Europe (UNECE or ECE) guidelines and create a basis of ECE regulation of hydrogen vehicles and the necessary infrastructure replacing national legislation and regulations. The aim of this project was enhancing of the safety of hydrogen vehicles and harmonizing their licensing and approval process.

== History ==
EIHP was launched in 1998. It was coordinated by Ludwig-Bölkow-Systemtechnik GmbH, a German consultancy company. Its phase 1 lasted from 1998 to 2000. It consists of 10 partners including research institutes, energy companies and automotive industries such as BMW, Renault, and Volvo. During the phase 1, information about the existing legislation and safety of alternative propulsion vehicles and related infrastructure was collected. As a result of the phase 1, UNECE drafted regulations for the onboard storage system for liquid hydrogen, and for the on-board storage system for gaseous hydrogen.

Phase 2 lasted from 2001 to 2004 and it developed drafts of a harmonized regulation for hydrogen-fuelled road vehicles, procedures for periodic hydrogen vehicle inspections, and standards and periodic inspection procedures for the relevant refuelling infrastructure, subsystems and components. During phase 2, a new liquefied hydrogen (LH_{2}) storage system (cryogenic tank) was designed and manufactured. It was approved safe by TÜV SÜD, the German Technical Inspection Association. Phase 2 also developed a semi-quantitative risk analysis methodology (Rapid Risk Ranking), which is used for risk assessment of several hydrogen applications. There were 20 partners of phase 2.

Although regulations worked-out by EIHP are not officially adopted, they are used as guidelines for design and approval of on-board cryogenic storage systems. For example, General Motors and BMW have announced that they are following EIHP's draft regulations when jointly developing refueling devices for liquid hydrogen vehicles.

== Participants ==
Partners of the European Integrated Hydrogen Project – Phase II were researchers working at the following institutions:

- Vandenborre Technologies
- BMW
- DaimlerChrysler
- Ford
- Karlsruhe Institute of Technology
- Ludwig-Bölkow-Systemtechnik
- Linde
- Messer Griesheim
- Opel
- Instituto Nacional de Técnica Aeroespacial
- Air Liquide
- Commissariat à l'Énergie Atomique
- Air Products & Chemicals
- BP
- Royal Dutch Shell
- National Centre of Scientific Research "DEMOKRITOS"
- EC-Joint Research Centre
- Det Norske Veritas
- Norsk Hydro
- Raufoss Technology
- Volvo

== See also ==
- Energy law
- Energy policy
- Energy supply
- Hydrogen economy
- World Forum for Harmonization of Vehicle Regulations
