= Operation Concrete =

- Opening titles
- Directed by: Jean-Luc Godard
- Written by: Jean-Luc Godard
- Narrated by: Jean-Luc Godard
- Cinematography: Adrién Porchet
- Edited by: Jean-Luc Godard
- Distributed by: Société des Etablissements L. Gaumont
- Release date: 2 July 1958
- Running time: 20 minutes
- Country: Switzerland
- Language: French

Operation Concrete (French: Opération béton) is a 1958 Swiss documentary short by French filmmaker Jean-Luc Godard, notable for being his first film of any length. The film documents the construction of the massive concrete Grande Dixence Dam in Valais, Switzerland.

Godard was attracted to the subject while working on the dam as a laborer and telephone switchboard operator. He produced the film with his friend Pierre Laubscher, as well as camera operator Adrien Porchet and fellow friend Roland Tolmatchoff. The group shot the film in 35mm and recorded sound on location, unusually for the time. The film was sold to the Grand Dixence Corporation, which had built the dam.

== Production ==
=== Background and conception ===
By 1952, Godard had relocated to Switzerland from Paris, where he had written for Cahiers du Cinéma and lived a Bohemian lifestyle. Godard's aim in Switzerland was to make money to finance his dreams of filmmaking. On December 24 of that year, his mother introduced Godard to her lover, Jean-Pierre Laubscher, an engineer on the Grande Dixence Dam in Valais. The following April, Godard sent Laubscher a formal letter asking for help in getting hired at one of Laubscher's work sites. The two developed a casual friendship, as Laubscher was only three years older than Godard. After a few weeks, Laubscher found Godard a job as a laborer on the dam. The job involved hard labor, and when it came time to renew his contract, Godard was rehired as a telephone switchboard operator.

Godard conceived the project while working at the dam, and in January 1954 mentioned to Laubscher the idea to shoot a documentary about the dam's construction. Godard hoped to shoot in 16 mm and sell the film "to English television and to the dam management," before acquiring five to six thousand Swiss francs to reshoot in the more professional 35mm format.

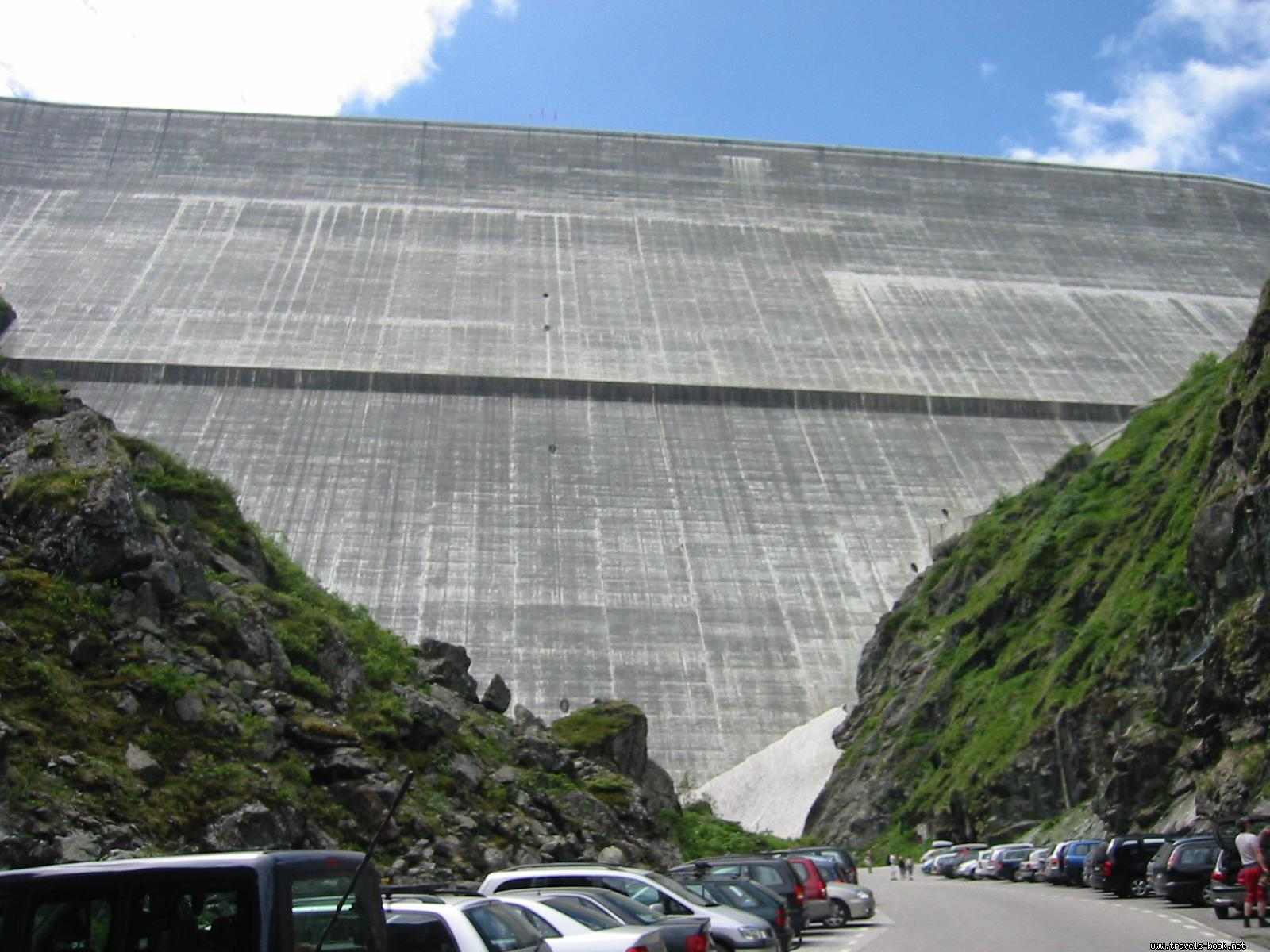
The Grand Dixence Dam, the construction of which Godard depicted in Operation Béton

=== Filming ===
At the suggestion of his friend, Roland Tolmatchoff, Godard worked ten days of consecutive shifts in order to raise money for the film, sleeping on the site in a cot. Tolmatchoff borrowed a 35mm camera from Actua-Film, a recently founded documentary production company based in Geneva, and also enlisted the services of Actua-Film camera operator Adrien Porchet as Godard's cinematographer. Godard, not having to purchase a 35mm camera, was now able to afford 35mm film.

After production had commenced, Godard's mother, Odile Monod, was killed in a scooter accident in Lausanne on April 26, 1954. Godard took a break from filming for her funeral, but was prevented from attending by his mother's family due to Godard's habit of stealing from them. He returned to the dam in order to film the concreting of the dam in May. Porchet's filming emphasized the dam's importance and the various operations involved in the concreting process.

Godard was aware of another film about the dam, Roland Muller and Jean Daetwyler's Barrage, was being prepared, and wished to improve his own project with high quality sound equipment. Unusually for documentaries at the time, Godard stressed recording location sound, proclaiming that he "wanted to record each sound at its place: if it's this river, don't take another river. A real fanaticism of reality." Godard rented a professional sound truck, and carried the heavy tape recorders around the site with Porchet and Tolmatchoff.

=== Post-production ===
Godard edited the film every weekend in a Geneva editing room. The film's two-page narration was written by Laubscher in October and was under the title "La Campagne du Béton," translatable as either "The Campaign of Concrete" or "The Concrete Countryside." Godard rewrote the film's commentary to give its narration a less technical and more lyrical feeling, transforming it, in the words of Godard biographer Richard Brody, into an enthusiastic account of Godard's work rather than "a series of photo captions." Recording the narration himself, Godard also changed the film's title to the rhyming Operation Béton (Operation Concrete). Neither Laubscher nor Tolmatchoff were credited, despite being their work as writer and assistant respectively.

== Release ==
The Grand Dixence Corporation, which had built the dam, bought the film as Godard had hoped. A journalist from the film magazine Schweizer Film Suisse spoke enthusiastically of the film, comparing Godard to "a medieval artisan," who "created his masterpiece in order to obtain his mastery." With the money from the project, Godard quit his job on the dam and moved to Geneva to complete his first narrative short film Une femme coquette (1955).

== Works cited ==
- Baecque, Antoine de (2010). Godard: biographie. Paris: B. Grasset. ISBN 978-2-246-64781-2.
- Brody, Richard (2008). Everything Is Cinema: The Working Life of Jean-Luc Godard (1. ed ed.). New York: Metropolitan Books. ISBN 978-0-8050-6886-3.
