= Lykilsvatnet =

Lake in Vestland, Norway

- Løkjelsvatnet (unofficial)
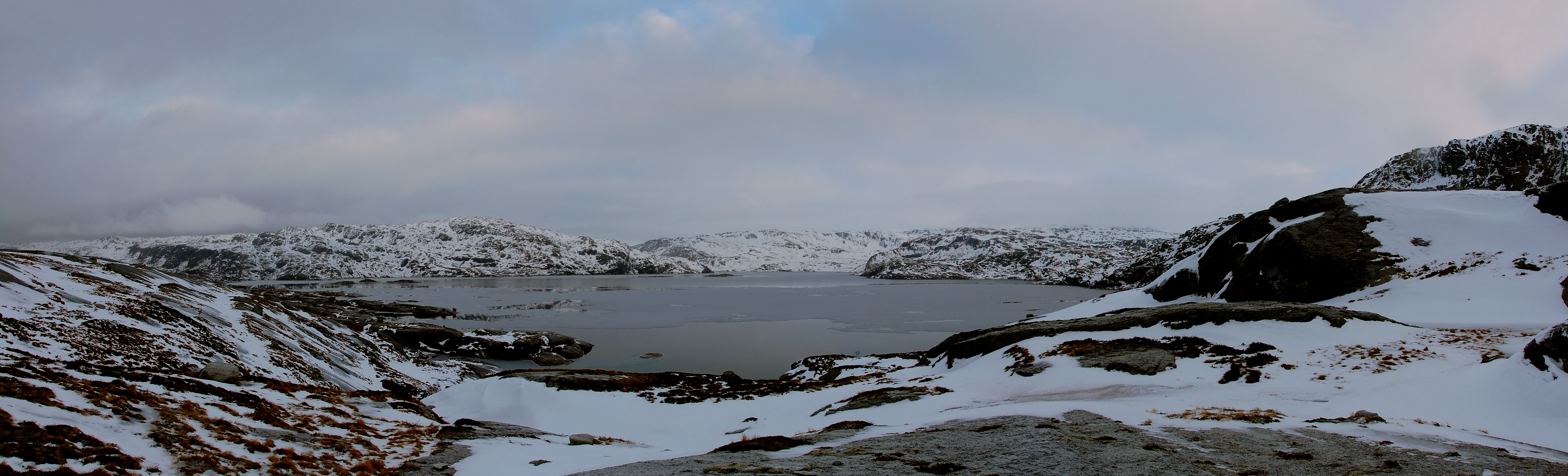
- Løkjelsvatnet in winter
- Interactive map of Lykilsvatnet
- Location: Etne Municipality, Vestland
- Coordinates: 59.6581°N 6.1288°E
- Basin countries: Norway
- Max. length: 4 kilometres (2.5 mi)
- Max. width: 2.2 kilometres (1.4 mi)
- Surface area: 4.51 km^{2} (1.74 sq mi)
- Shore length^{1}: 15.79 kilometres (9.81 mi)
- Surface elevation: 626 metres (2,054 ft)
- References: NVE
- ^{1} Shore length is not a well-defined measure.

Lykilsvatnet is a regulated lake in Etne Municipality in Vestland county, Norway. The 4.51-square-kilometre (1.74 sq mi) lake lies about 10 kilometres (6.2 mi) east of the village of Etnesjøen. Water from the lake falls 400 metres (1,300 ft) vertically in tunnels and pipelines to the Hardeland hydroelectric power station. The site is operated by Haugaland Kraft.

The Haugesund section of the Norwegian Mountain Touring Association operates the Løkjelsvatn cabin on the west shore of the lake, and there are marked maintain paths connecting the area to the rest of a nationwide network of paths. The lake has a rich population of brown trout which is popular among fishermen.

A group of eleven domesticated reindeer were introduced to the Etnefjellet mountain area in 1990, and the herd has adopted the Løkjelsvatnet lake area as its main habitat. This herd is now viewed and administered as if it were a wild herd.

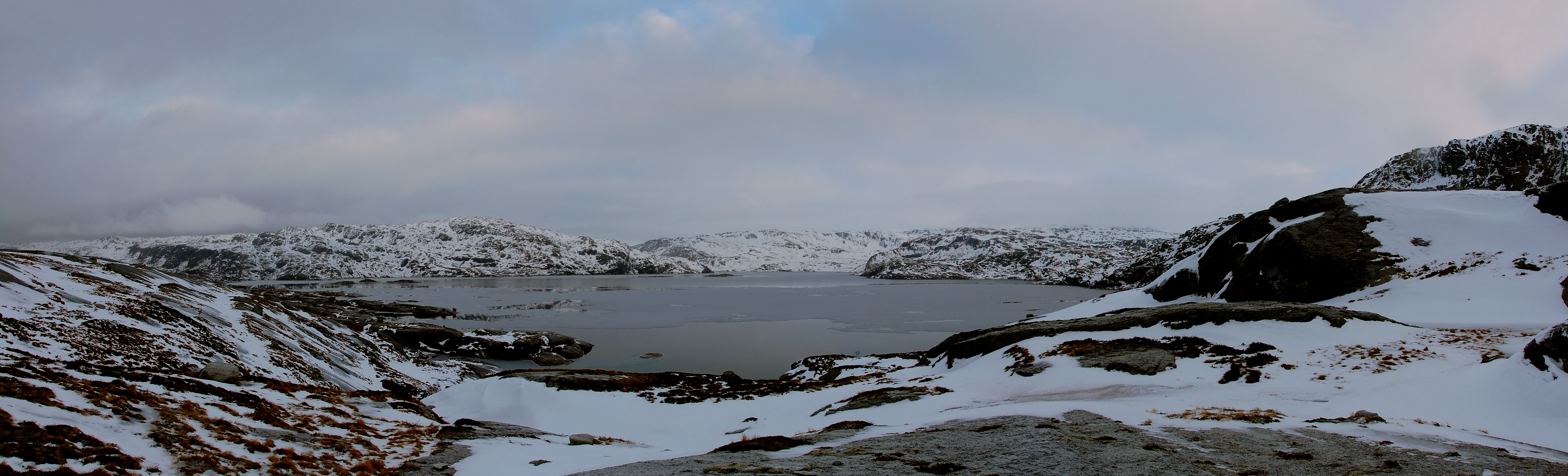
Løkjelsvatnet in winter

== See also ==
- List of lakes in Norway
