= Sabah Gas Industries =

Malaysian holding company

- Type: State owned
- Founded: 1982
- Founder: Government of Sabah
- Defunct: 1992
- Successor: Antara Steel Mills; Petronas Methanol (Labuan)
- Headquarters: Labuan, Malaysia
- Owner: Government of Sabah
- Divisions: Steel; Chemicals; Electricity

Sabah Gas Industries Sdn Bhd was a state owned holding company based in Labuan, Malaysia. It was established in 1982 by the Government of Sabah for the downstream operations of Sabah natural gas resources. The company owned and operated a 660,000-tonne per year methanol plant, a 600,000-tonne per year sponge iron factory, and a 79 MW natural gas-fired power station, all commissioned in 1984, after the gas pipeline from the offshore gas fields became operational. The industries were supplied by natural gas from the Erb West and Samarang offshore fields. In the beginning of the 1990s, due to financial difficulties, the company was put for privatisation. In 1992, the methanol plant was sold to Petronas and operates today as Petronas Methanol (Labuan) Sdn Bhd. The power station was sold to Sabah Electricity. The sponge iron factory was bought by the affiliated companies of the today's Lion Group. The plant operates today as Antara Steel Mills Sdn Bhd.

== See also ==
- Energy policy of Malaysia
