= Grande Dixence Dam =

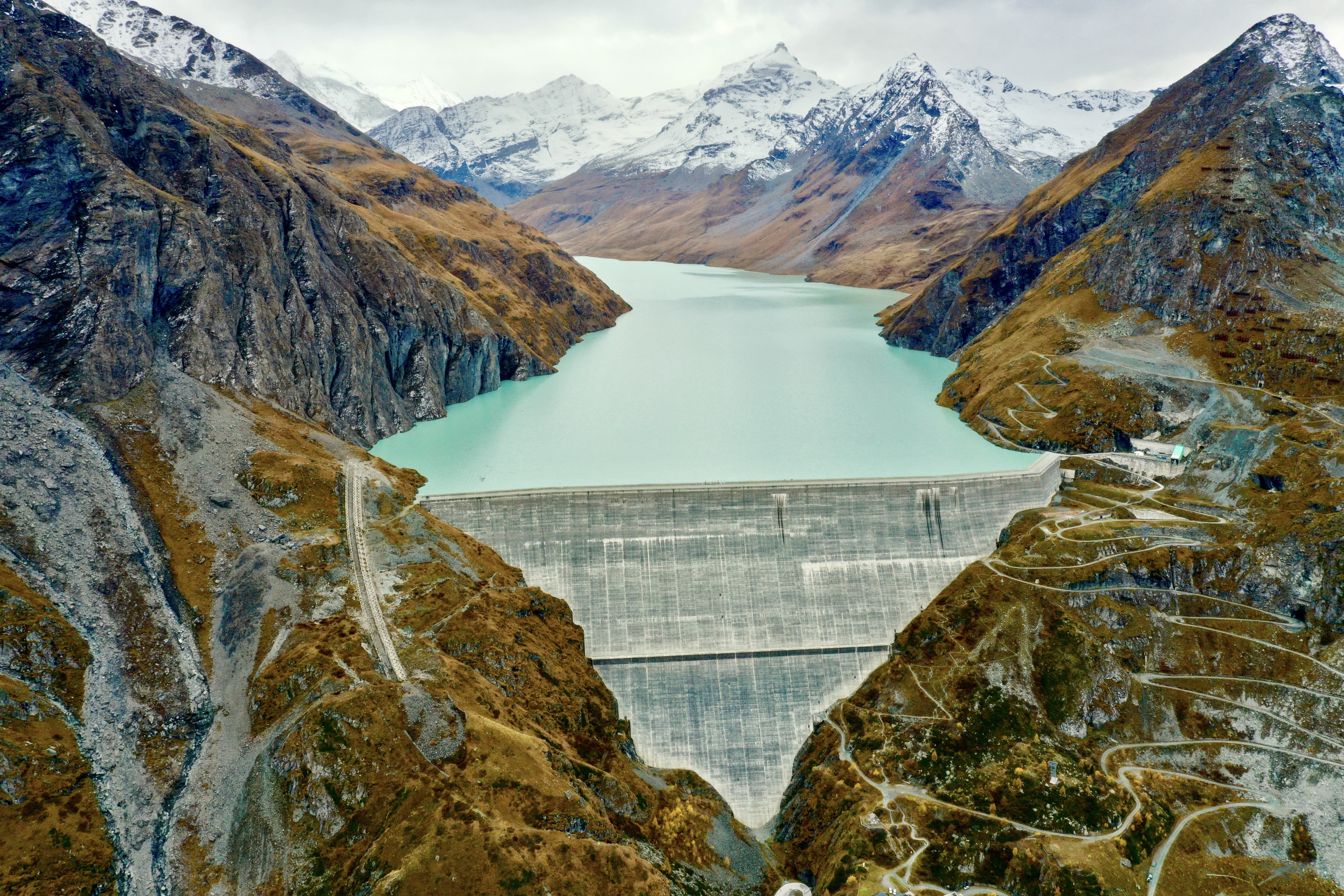
- Aerial view

- Location within Canton of Valais Location within Switzerland Location within Alps
- Interactive map of Grande Dixence Dam
- Location: Hérémence, Switzerland
- Coordinates: 46°04′50″N 07°24′14″E
- Status: In use
- Construction began: 1950
- Opening date: 1961
- Operators: Grande Dixence SA; Energie Ouest Suisse

Dam and spillways
- Type of dam: Gravity dam
- Impounds: Dixence (river)
- Height: 285 m (935 ft)
- Length: 700 m (2,297 ft)
- Width (base): 200 m (656 ft)
- Dam volume: 6,000,000 m^{3} (210,000,000 ft^{3})

Reservoir
- Creates: Lac des Dix
- Total capacity: 400,000,000 m^{3} (320,000 acre⋅ft)
- Catchment area: 46 km^{2} (18 sq mi)
- Surface area: 4 km^{2} (2 sq mi)
- Maximum water depth: 284 m (932 ft)

Power Station
- Commission date: 1965, 1998
- Installed capacity: 2,069 MW
- Annual generation: 2,000 GWh

The Grande Dixence Dam (French pronunciation: [gʁãd diksãs]) is a concrete gravity dam on the Dixence at the head of the Val d'Hérémence in the canton of Valais in Switzerland. At 285 m (935 ft) high, it is the tallest gravity dam in the world, seventh tallest dam overall, and the tallest dam in Europe. It is part of the Cleuson-Dixence Complex. With the primary purpose of hydroelectric power generation, the dam fuels four power stations, totaling the installed capacity to 2,069 MW, generating approximately 2,000 GWh annually, enough to power 400,000 Swiss households.

The dam withholds the Lac des Dix ('Lake of the Ten'), its reservoir. With a surface area of 4 km^{2}, it is the second largest lake in Valais and the largest lake above 2,000 m in the Alps. The reservoir receives its water from four different pumping stations; the Z’Mutt, Stafel, Ferpècle and Arolla. At peak capacity, it contains approximately 400,000,000 m^{3} (1.4×10^{10} ft^{3}) of water, with depths reaching up to 284 m (932 ft). Construction on the dam began in 1950 and was completed in 1961, before officially commissioning in 1965.

== History ==
Construction of the Grande Dixence in 1955, showing the original and smaller dam at the top

In 1922, Energie Ouest Suisse (EOS) became established with a few small power stations. To generate substantial amounts of electricity, EOS looked to the Valais canton which contains 56% of Switzerland's glaciers and stores the largest amount of water in Europe. In 1927, EOS acquired the license for the upper Dixence basin. In 1929, 1,200 workers constructed the first Dixence dam which would be complete in 1935. The first dam would supply water to the Chandoline Power Station which has a capacity of 120 MW.

After the Second World War, growing industries needed electricity and construction on the Cleuson Dam began in 1947 and was completed in 1951. The original Dixence dam was submerged by the filling of Lac des Dix beginning in 1957; it can still be seen when the reservoir level is low. Plans for the Super Dixence Dam were finalized by the recently founded company, Grande Dixence SA. Construction on the Super Dixence Dam began in late 1950. By 1961, 3,000 workers had finished pouring 6,000,000 m^{3} (210,000,000 ft^{3}) of concrete, completing the dam. At 285 m, it was the world's tallest dam at the time, but it was surpassed by the Nurek Dam of Tajikistan in 1972 (300 m). It remains the world's tallest gravity dam.

In the 1980s, Grande Dixence SA and EOS began the Cleuson-Dixence project which improved the quality of electricity produced by building new tunnels along with the Bieudron Power Station. By the time the Cleuson-Dixence Complex was complete, the power generated had more than doubled.

A short documentary film, Opération béton, was made about the dam's construction by Jean-Luc Godard as first-time director.

== Characteristics ==
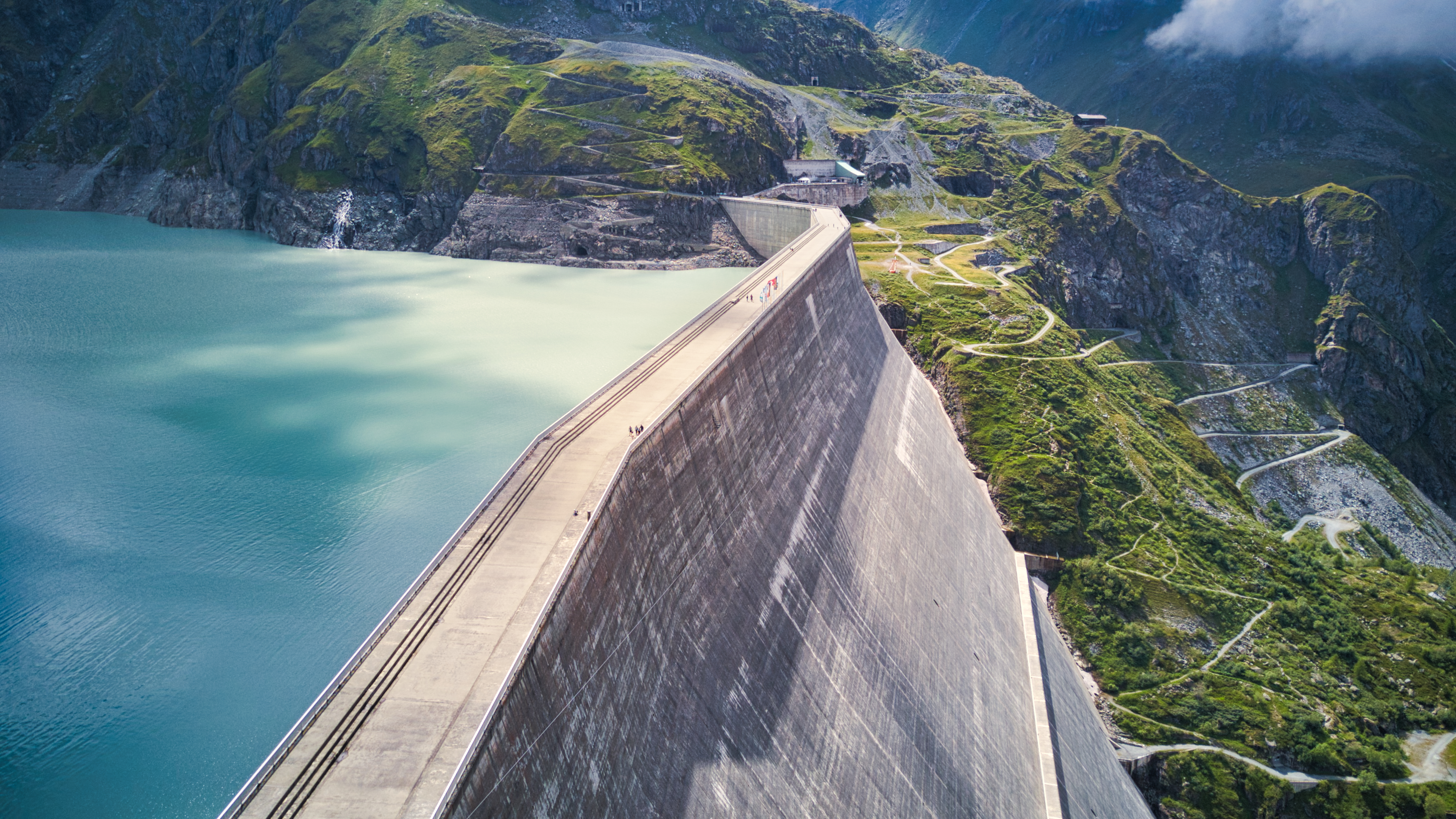
Tourists walking on 700 metre-long top of the dam

The Grande Dixence Dam is a 285 m (935 ft) high, 700 m (2,297 ft) long concrete gravity dam. The dam is 200 m (656 ft) wide at its base and 15 m (49 ft) wide at its crest. The dam's crest reaches an altitude of 2,365 m (7,759 ft). The dam structure contains approximately 6,000,000 m^{3} (211,888,000 ft^{3}) of concrete. To secure the dam to the surrounding foundation, a grout curtain surrounds the dam, reaching a depth of 200 m (656 ft) and extending 100 m (328 ft) on each side of the valley.

Although the dam is situated on the relatively small Dixence, water supplied from other rivers and streams is pumped by the Z’Mutt, Stafel, Ferpècle and Arolla pumping stations. The pumping stations transport the water through 100 km (62 mi) of tunnels into Lac des Dix. Water from the 87 m (285 ft) high Cleuson Dam, located 7 km (4 mi) to the northwest, is also transported from its reservoir, the Lac de Cleuson. Three penstocks transport water from Lac des Dix to the Chandoline, Fionnay, Nendaz and Bieudron power stations, before being discharged into the Rhône below. All the pumping stations, power stations and dams form the Cleuson-Dixence Complex. Although the complex operates with water being pumped from one reservoir to another, it does not technically qualify as a pumped-storage scheme.

Most of the water comes from glaciers melting during the summer. The lake is usually at full capacity by late September, and empties during the winter, eventually reaching its lowest point around April.

== Power stations ==
Diagram of Cleuson-Dixence Complex

=== Chandoline Power Station ===
The Chandoline Power Station was the power station for the original Dixence Dam. The Grande Dixence Dam submerged the original dam but the power station still operates with water received from the reservoir of the Grande Dixence Dam, Lac des Dix. The power station is the smallest of the four, producing 120 MW from five Pelton turbines with a gross head of 1,748 m (5,735 ft).

=== Fionnay Power Station ===
The Fionnay Power Station receives water from the Grande Dixence Dam by a 9 km (6 mi) long tunnel with an average gradient of 10%. Once the tunnel reaches a surge chamber at Louvie in Bagnes, it turns into a penstock which descends at a gradient of 73% for 800 m (2,625 ft) until it reaches the power station. The water, now flowing at a maximum rate of 45 m^{3}/s (1,589 cu ft/s) spins six Pelton turbines, generating a combined maximum capacity of 290 MW.

==== Nendaz Power Station ====
After arriving at the Fionnay Power Station from the Grande Dixence Dam, water then travels through a 16 km (10 mi) pressure tunnel which eventually leads into the Péroua surge chamber, 1,000 m (3,281 ft) above the Nendaz Power Station. The water, which remains at a maximum rate of 45 m^{3}/s (1,589 cu ft/s) spins six Pelton turbines, generating a combined maximum capacity of 390 MW.

The Nendaz power station is located within mountains between Aproz and Riddes and is the second-largest hydroelectric power station in Switzerland after the Bieudron Power Station.

=== Bieudron Power Station ===
The water travels down a long penstock from the Grande Dixence Dam before reaching the Bieudron Power Station 1,883 m (6,178 ft) down. The water spins three pelton turbines, generating a combined capacity of 1,269 MW. The power station was constructed after the Nendaz and Fionnay power stations. The power station was built by both Grande Dixence SA and Energie Ouest Suisse between 1993 and 1998 at a cost of US$1.2 billion.

The Bieudron Power Station alone holds three world records, for the height of its head (1,883 m (6,178 ft)), the output of each Pelton turbine (3 × 423 MW) and the output per pole of the generators (35.7 MVA). It was taken out of service in December 2000 after the rupture of a penstock. The power station became partially operational in December 2009 and fully operational in 2010.

== See also ==
- List of lakes of Switzerland
- List of mountain lakes of Switzerland
- List of tallest dams
