= Sri Lanka Electricity Act 2024 =

Sri Lanka Electricity Act, No. 36 of 2024

Parliament of Sri Lanka
- Long title: An Act to provide for the implementation of reforms to the electricity industry; to provide for the establishment of the National Electricity Advisory Council; to provide for the Public Utilities Commission of Sri Lanka, established under the Public Utilities Commission of Sri Lanka Act, No. 35 of 2002 to be the regulator for the electricity industry in terms of this Act; to provide legislative measures applicable to the incorporation of corporate entities under the Companies Act, No.07 of 2007 in whom all activities connected to the generation, transmission, distribution, trade, supply and procurement of electricity shall vest; to specify the processes to be applicable to all related activities; to repeal the Ceylon Electricity Board Act, No. 17 of 1969 and the Sri Lanka Electricity Act, No. 20 of 2009 and to provide for all matters connected therewith or incidental thereto
- Citation: Sri Lanka Electricity Act, No. 36 of 2024
- Territorial extent: Sri Lanka
- Enacted by: Parliament of Sri Lanka
- Enacted: June 6, 2024
- Signed by: Speaker of the Parliament
- Signed: June 27, 2024
- Effective: Various dates for different sections
- Administered by: Public Utilities Commission of Sri Lanka (PUCSL)

Legislative history
- Bill title: Sri Lanka Electricity Bill
- Bill citation: Sri Lanka Electricity Bill
- Introduced by: Minister of Power and Energy
- Introduced: April 17, 2024
- First reading: April 25, 2024
- Second reading: June 6, 2022
- Third reading: June 6, 2022

Repeals
- Ceylon Electricity Board Act, No. 17 of 1969; Sri Lanka Electricity Act, No. 20 of 2009

Supreme Court cases
- Supreme Court Determination on the Bill

Keywords
- Electricity reform, Regulation, Restructuring, Market competition, Renewable energy
- Status: Not fully in force

The Sri Lanka Electricity Act, No. 36 of 2024 is a landmark legislative act enacted by the Parliament of the Democratic Socialist Republic of Sri Lanka. Certified on 27th June 2024, the Act introduces substantial reforms to the electricity industry in Sri Lanka, aiming to improve efficiency, attract investment, and promote the use of renewable energy sources.

== Introduction ==
The Act was enacted to implement comprehensive reforms in the country's electricity sector. It establishes the National Electricity Advisory Council and designates the Public Utilities Commission of Sri Lanka (PUCSL) as the primary regulator. The Act aims to facilitate the incorporation of corporate entities responsible for the generation, transmission, distribution, trade, supply, and procurement of electricity, promoting market competition and private sector investment.

== Background ==
The need for reform in Sri Lanka's electricity sector had been recognised for several years. Previous legislation, including the Ceylon Electricity Board Act, No. 17 of 1969, and the Sri Lanka Electricity Act, No. 20 of 2009, were deemed insufficient to address the evolving challenges of the industry, such as inefficiencies, financial sustainability, and the integration of renewable energy sources.

=== Historical context ===
- Pre-2024 Framework: The electricity sector was predominantly controlled by the state-owned Ceylon Electricity Board (CEB), which faced criticism for inefficiencies and financial losses.
- Global Trends: Many countries worldwide had already transitioned to more liberalised electricity markets, encouraging competition and private investment, which provided models for Sri Lanka's reforms.

== Objectives ==
The primary objectives of the Act include:

- Performance Improvement: Ensuring improved performance through independent and accountable corporate entities.
- Private Sector Investment: Facilitating private sector investment and market competition.
- Renewable Energy: Promoting the integration of renewable energy sources and decarbonisation.
- Consumer Protection: Protecting consumer interests and ensuring affordable electricity tariffs.
- Sustainability: Enhancing the sustainability of electricity generation and distribution.

== Key provisions ==
1. National Electricity Advisory Council: Establishment of a council to advise the Minister on national electricity policy and reforms. The Council comprises experts from various fields, including energy, finance, and environmental sciences.
2. Public Utilities Commission of Sri Lanka: Designation of PUCSL as the regulator for the electricity industry, tasked with ensuring fair practices, setting tariffs, and protecting consumer rights.
3. Corporate Entities: Incorporation of independent corporate entities for managing various activities in the electricity sector, including generation, transmission, and distribution.
4. Market Competition: Promotion of competition and elimination of barriers to entry in the electricity market, ensuring a level playing field for private and public entities.
5. Tariff Principles: Establishment of transparent tariff principles to ensure affordability and financial viability, based on cost-reflective tariffs and subsidies for vulnerable groups.
6. Renewable Energy Incentives: Introduction of incentives for renewable energy projects, including tax breaks and subsidies, to encourage investment in sustainable energy sources.

== Implementation ==
The Act specifies the roles and responsibilities of various stakeholders, including the National Electricity Advisory Council, PUCSL, and newly formed corporate entities. It also outlines the procedures for formulating and implementing national electricity policies, tariffs, and long-term power system development plans.

=== Steps for implementation ===
- Corporate Restructuring: Transitioning the CEB into separate corporate entities responsible for specific functions.
- Regulatory Framework: Establishing a comprehensive regulatory framework under PUCSL to oversee the sector.
- Public-Private Partnerships: Encouraging public-private partnerships to leverage private sector expertise and investment.
- Capacity Building: Investing in capacity building for regulatory and operational staff to manage the new system effectively.

== Significance ==
The Act marks a significant shift towards a more competitive, efficient, and sustainable electricity sector in Sri Lanka. By encouraging private sector participation and promoting renewable energy, the Act aims to meet the growing electricity demand and contribute to the country's economic development and environmental sustainability.

=== Economic impact ===
- Investment Attraction: The Act is expected to attract significant foreign and domestic investment in the electricity sector.
- Job Creation: Creation of jobs through new projects and companies entering the market.

=== Environmental impact ===
- Decarbonisation: Contributing to Sri Lanka's climate goals by reducing reliance on fossil fuels and increasing the share of renewable energy in the energy mix.

== See also ==
- Electricity sector in Sri Lanka
