= Lac de Cleuson =

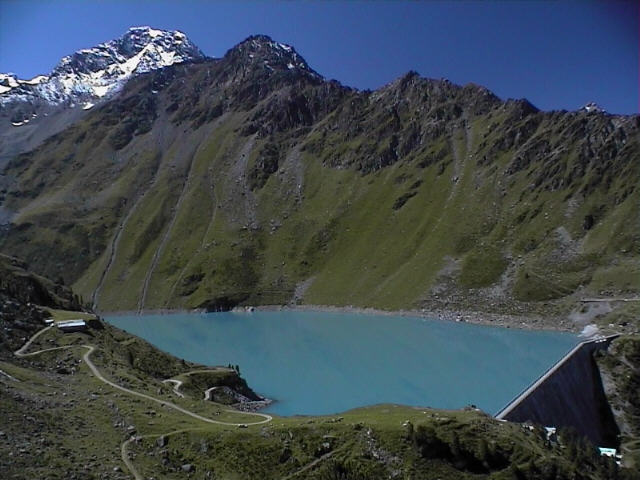

- Location within Canton of Valais Location within Switzerland Location within Alps
- Interactive map of Lac de Cleuson
- Location: Valais
- Coordinates: 46°6′36″N 7°19′22″E
- Type: reservoir
- Primary outflows: Printse
- Catchment area: 16 km^{2} (6.2 sq mi)
- Basin countries: Switzerland
- Max. length: 1.4 km (0.87 mi)
- Surface area: 0.51 km^{2} (0.20 sq mi)
- Max. depth: 76 m (249 ft)
- Water volume: 20 million cubic metres (16,000 acre⋅ft)
- Surface elevation: 2,186 m (7,172 ft)

Lac de Cleuson is a reservoir in the municipality of Nendaz, Valais, Switzerland. Its surface area is 0.51 km^{2} (0.20 sq mi). Water from the reservoir is often pumped into the Grande Dixence Dam's reservoir, Lac des Dix, for use in hydroelectricity production.

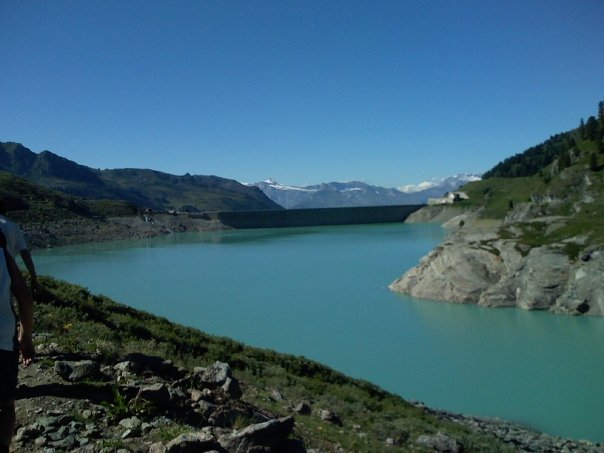
Lac de Cleuson length seen from western bank facing north

== See also ==
- List of lakes of Switzerland
- List of mountain lakes of Switzerland
