= Public Utilities Commission of Sri Lanka =

Sri Lankan government entity

- ශ්‍රී ලංකා මහජන උපයෝගිතා කොමිෂන් සභාව இலங்கைப் பொதுப் பயன்பாடுகள் ஆணைக்குழு

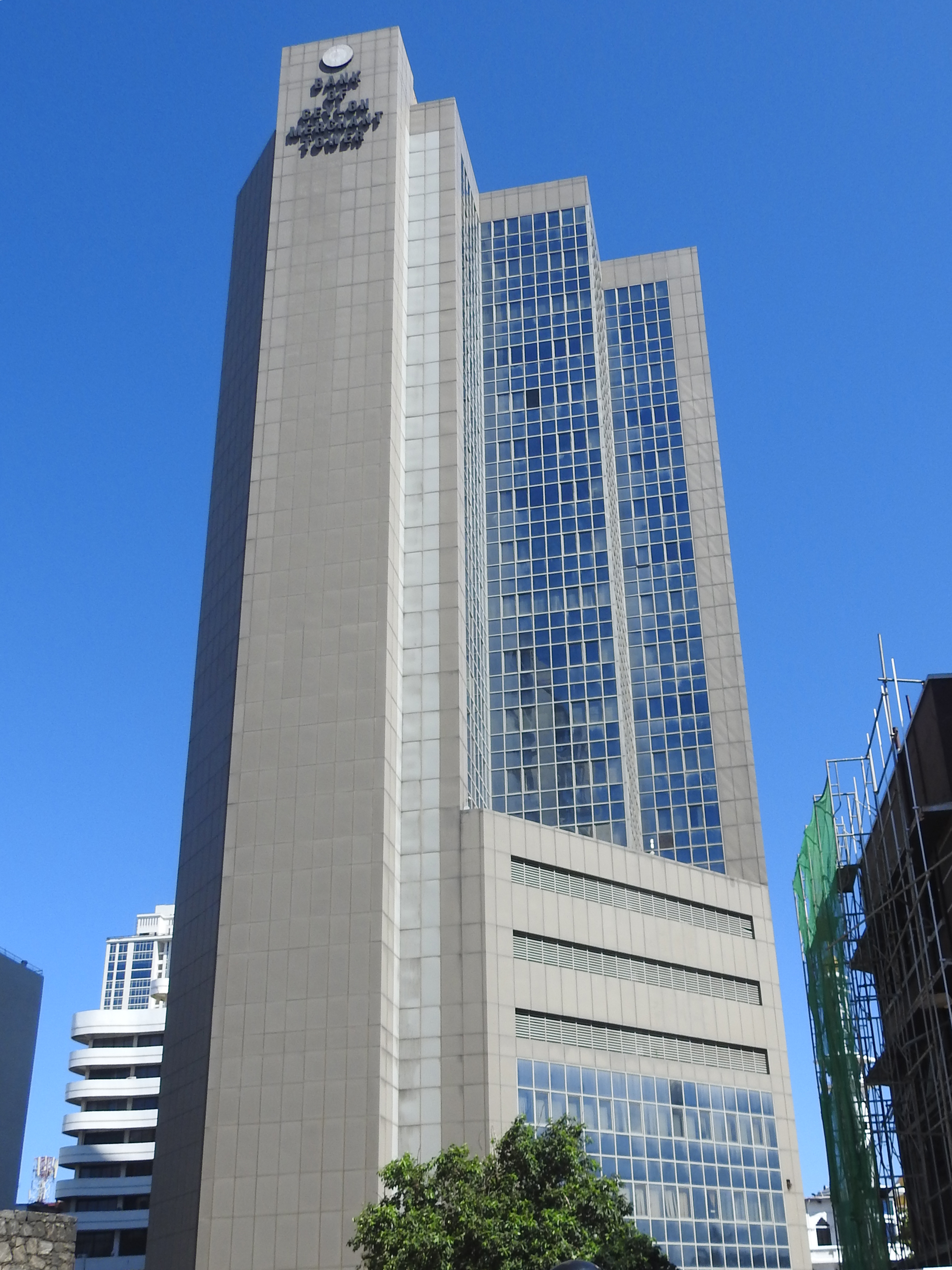
- The Bank of Ceylon Merchant Tower, which houses the PUCSL

Agency overview
- Jurisdiction: Government of Sri Lanka
- Headquarters: Floor 6, BOC Merchant Tower, St. Michael’s Road, Colombo 3; 06°54′45″N 79°51′03″E
- Employees: 40-60
- Annual budget: Rs 249.8 million (2017)
- Agency executives: Prof. K. P. L. Chandralal, Commission Chairman; Eng. Piyal Hennayake, Dr. M. C. S. Fernando, Lilantha Samaranayake, PhD, Commission members; Damitha Kumarasinghe, Director General; Kanchana Siriwardana and Nilantha Sapumanage, Deputy Director General; Nadheeja warapitiya, Secretary
- Key document: Public Utilities Commission of Sri Lanka Act, No. 35 of 2002
- Website: pucsl.gov.lk

The Public Utilities Commission of Sri Lanka (abbreviated PUCSL) (Sinhala: ශ්‍රී ලංකා මහජන උපයෝගිතා කොමිෂන් සභාව Śrī Laṃkā mahajana upayōgithā komishan sabhāwa; Tamil: இலங்கைப் பொதுப் பயன்பாடுகள் ஆணைக்குழ) is the government entity responsible for policy formulation and regulation of the electric power distribution, water supply, petroleum resources, and other public utilities in Sri Lanka.

The PUCSL was established by the Public Utilities Commission of Sri Lanka Act, No. 35 of 2002, and has authority for the execution of its duties through this Act, as well as through those established for organizations, agencies and corporations involved in providing public utilities in the country. It has a broad mandate to act both as a consumer protection authority, as well as an advisory, inspection and policy formulation body; as such, it is also involved in issuing and enforcing licences that regulate utilities on the island, enforcing contracts between utilities providers and the State, regulating utilities tariffs, resolving disputes (both between utilities providers and the State, and between them and the public), and the establishment and enforcing safety and quality standards within the utilities sector (including standardization of the country's power plugs and sockets). The Commission seeks to promote competition and efficiency among utilities providers, and harmonise the country's utilities sector with international standards.

The commission has recently been assigned the task of producing Sri Lanka's long-term power generation plan in the middle of power shortages and an impending energy crisis in the country- the Electricity Supply 2020 and Beyond report has been the subject of minor controversy, with unionized employees of the Ceylon Electricity Board in particular taking issue with it.

== Organizational structure ==
The Director General and Secretary to the Commission both report directly to the commission, with the latter having oversight of the PUCSL's legal affairs department and internal auditor, while the director general has direct oversight of:

- Corporate communication
- Finance
- Human resources
- Information technology

The main departments of the commission are controlled through the deputy director general -

- Consumer affairs
- Inspectorate
- Licensing
- Regulatory affairs
- Tariff and economic affairs
- Environment, efficiency and renewables

== Consumer Consultative Committee ==
The Consumer Consultative Committee (CCC) was established under section 29 of the PUCSL Act, in order to act as a forum for the representation of the general public and small industry within the commission and the broader utilities sector, and thus prevent the government and larger industry from dominating policy and regulation. The CCC consists of 15 volunteer members:

- one representative from each of the country's nine provinces (with three appointed for a 1-year term, three for a 2-year term and three for a 3-year term),
- one nominee from the Sri Lanka Automobile Association (2-year appointment),
- one nominee from the International Water Management Institute (1-year appointment),
- one nominee from the Sri Lanka Energy Managers' Association (3-year appointment),
- one nominee from the National Chamber of Commerce (3-year appointment),
- one nominee from the Ceylon Chamber of Commerce (3-year appointment),
- one nominee from the Federation of Chamber of Commerce (3-year appointment).

The CCC is responsible for consulting the general public on proposed policy changes, current issues in the utilities sector and any other matters that would affect the public, as well as outreach and education of the public on changes to existing regulatory and procedural practices or policies enacted by the State. It is also acts as a distinct advisory body to the commission by itself.

== See also ==
- Ceylon Petroleum Corporation
- Sri Lanka Electricity Act 2024
- List of dams and reservoirs in Sri Lanka
- List of power stations in Sri Lanka
- National Water Supply and Drainage Board
