= Pelton wheel =

Type of turbine

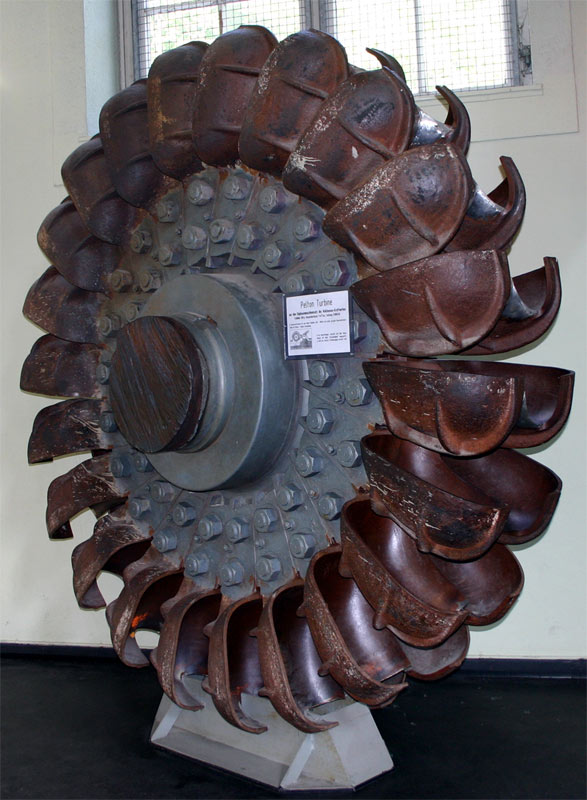
Old Pelton wheel from Walchensee Hydroelectric Power Station, Germany.

The Pelton wheel or Pelton Turbine is an impulse-type water turbine invented by American inventor Lester Allan Pelton in the 1870s. The Pelton wheel extracts energy from the impulse of moving water, as opposed to water's dead weight like the traditional overshot water wheel. Many earlier variations of impulse turbines existed, but they were less efficient than Pelton's design. Water leaving those wheels typically still had high speed, carrying away much of the dynamic energy brought to the wheels. Pelton's paddle geometry was designed so that when the rim ran at half the speed of the water jet, the water left the wheel with very little speed; thus his design extracted almost all of the water's impulse energy—which made for a very efficient turbine.

== History ==
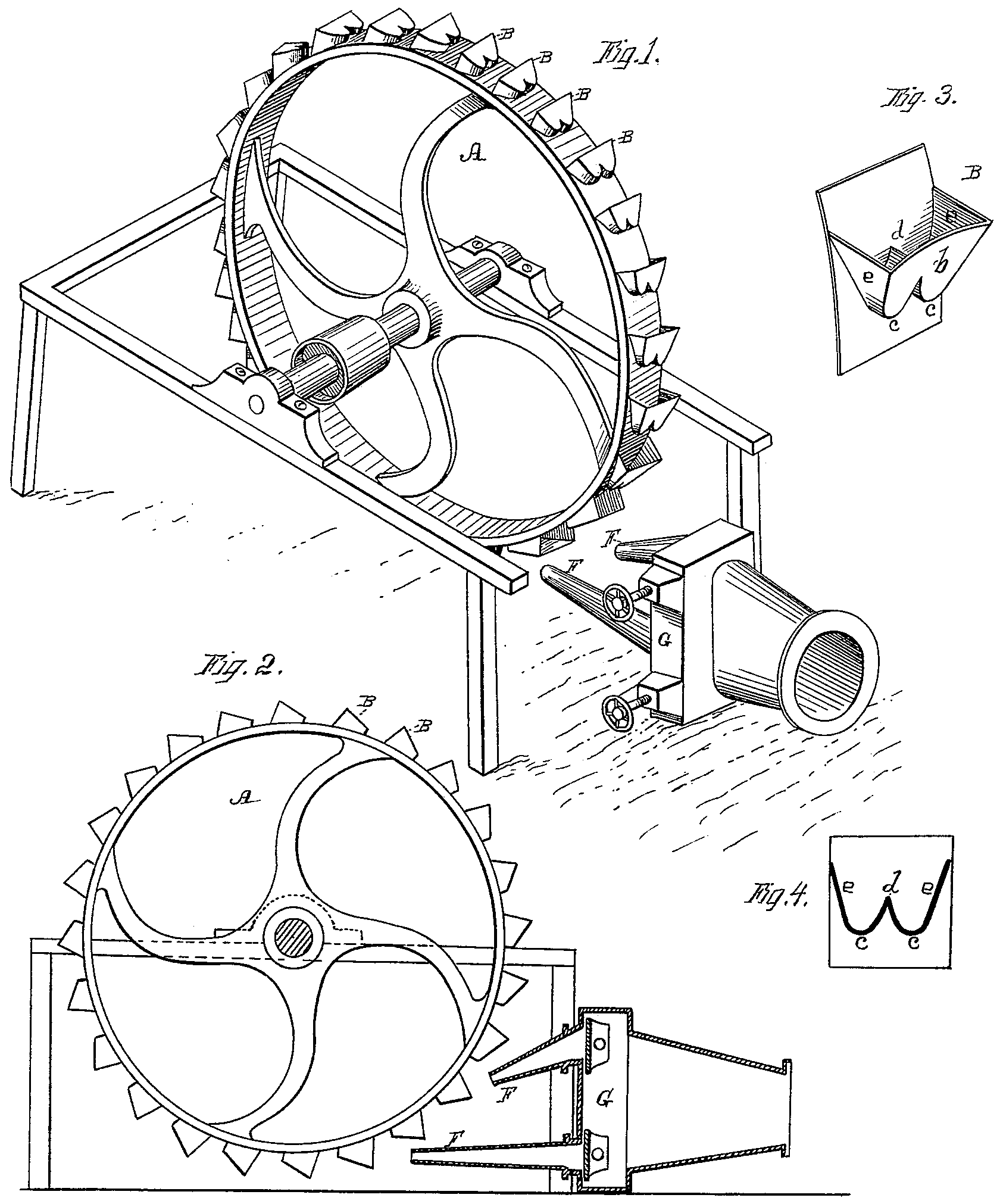
Figure from Lester Allan Pelton's original October 1880 patent

Lester Allan Pelton was born in Vermillion, Ohio in 1829. In 1850, he traveled overland to take part in the California Gold Rush. Pelton worked by selling fish he caught in the Sacramento River. In 1860, he moved to Camptonville, a center of placer mining activity. At this time many mining operations were powered by steam engines which consumed vast amounts of wood as their fuel. Some water wheels were used in the larger rivers, but they were ineffective in the smaller streams that were found near the mines. Pelton worked on a design for a water wheel that would work with the relatively small flow found in these streams.

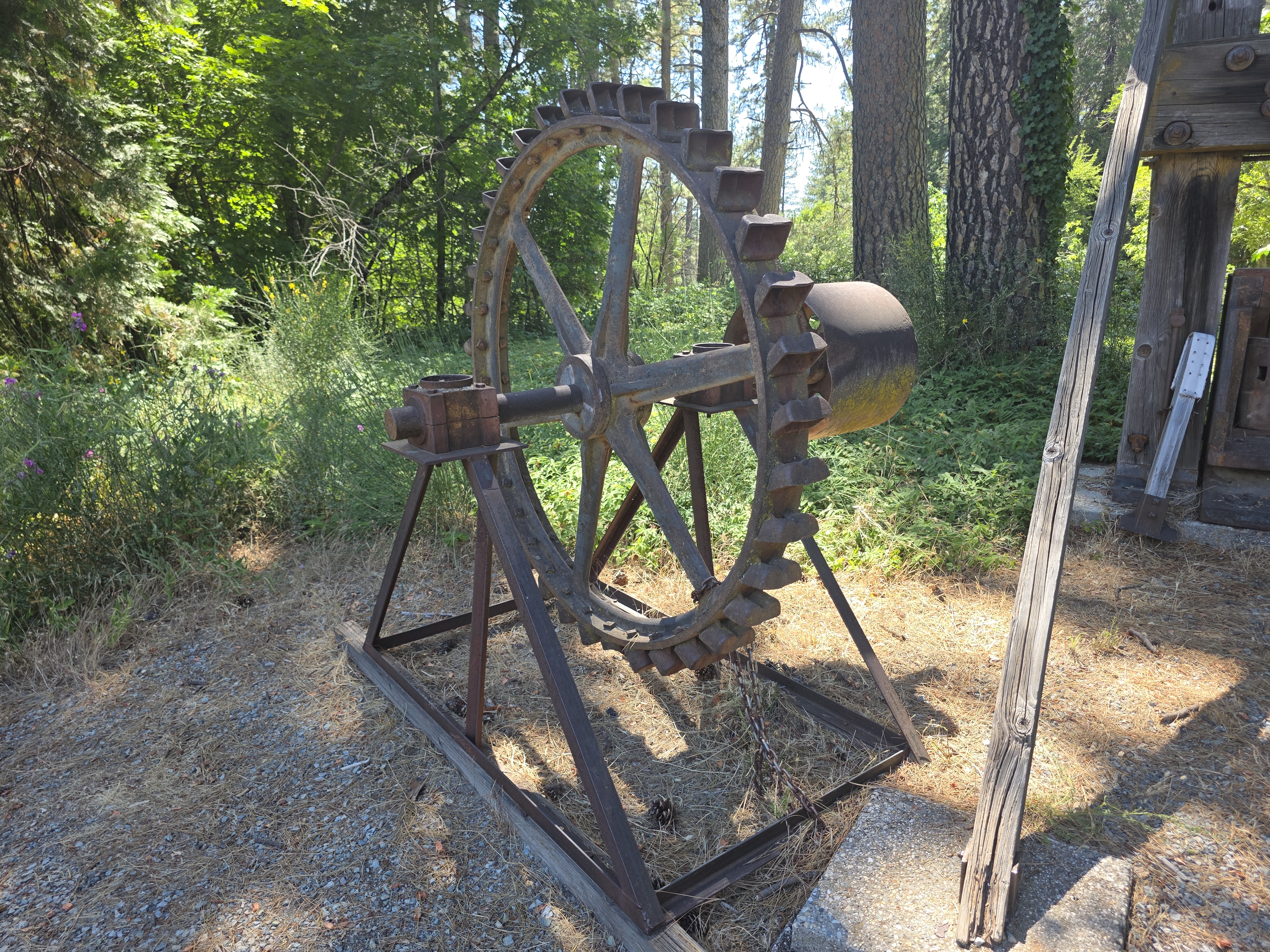
A Pelton wheel on display at the Empire Mine State Historic Park in Grass Valley, California

By the mid 1870s, Pelton had developed a wooden prototype of his new wheel. In 1876, he approached the Miners Foundry in Nevada City, California to build the first commercial models in iron. The first Pelton Wheel was installed at the Mayflower Mine in Nevada City in 1878. The efficiency advantages of Pelton's invention were quickly recognized and his product was soon in high demand. He patented his invention on 26 October 1880. By the mid-1880s, the Miners Foundry could not meet the demand, and in 1888, Pelton sold the rights to his name and the patents to his invention to the Pelton Water Wheel Company in San Francisco. The company established a factory at 121/123 Main Street in San Francisco.

The Pelton Water Wheel Company manufactured a large number of Pelton Wheels in San Francisco which were shipped around the world. In 1892, the Company added a branch on the east coast at 143 Liberty Street in New York City. By 1900, over 11,000 turbines were in use. In 1914, the company moved manufacturing to new, larger premises at 612 Alabama Street in San Francisco. In 1956, the company was acquired by the Baldwin-Lima-Hamilton Company, which ended manufacture of Pelton Wheels.

In New Zealand, A&G Price in Thames, New Zealand produced Pelton waterwheels for the local market. One of these is on outdoor display at the Thames Goldmine Experience.

== Design ==
Nozzles direct forceful, high-speed streams of water against a series of spoon-shaped buckets, also known as impulse blades, which are mounted around the outer rim of a drive wheel (also called a runner). As the water jet hits the blades, the direction of water velocity is changed to follow the contours of the blades. The impulse energy of the water jet exerts torque on the bucket-and-wheel system, spinning the wheel; the water jet does a "u-turn" and exits at the outer sides of the bucket, decelerated to a low velocity. In the process, the water jet's momentum is transferred to the wheel and hence to a turbine. Thus, "impulse" energy does work on the turbine.

Maximum power and efficiency are achieved when the velocity of the water jet is twice the velocity of the rotating buckets, which, assuming that water jet collides elastically with the bucket, would mean the water leaves the bucket with zero velocity, thus imparting all kinetic energy to the wheel. In practice, a very small percentage of the water jet's original kinetic energy will remain in the water, which causes the bucket to be emptied at the same rate it is filled, and thereby allows the high-pressure input flow to continue uninterrupted and without waste of energy.

Typically two buckets are mounted side-by-side on the wheel, with the water jet split into two equal streams; this balances the side-load forces on the wheel and helps to ensure smooth, efficient transfer of momentum from the water jet to the turbine wheel.

Because water is nearly incompressible, almost all of the available energy is extracted in the first stage of the hydraulic turbine. "Therefore, Pelton wheels have only one turbine stage, unlike gas turbines that operate with compressible fluid."

== Applications ==
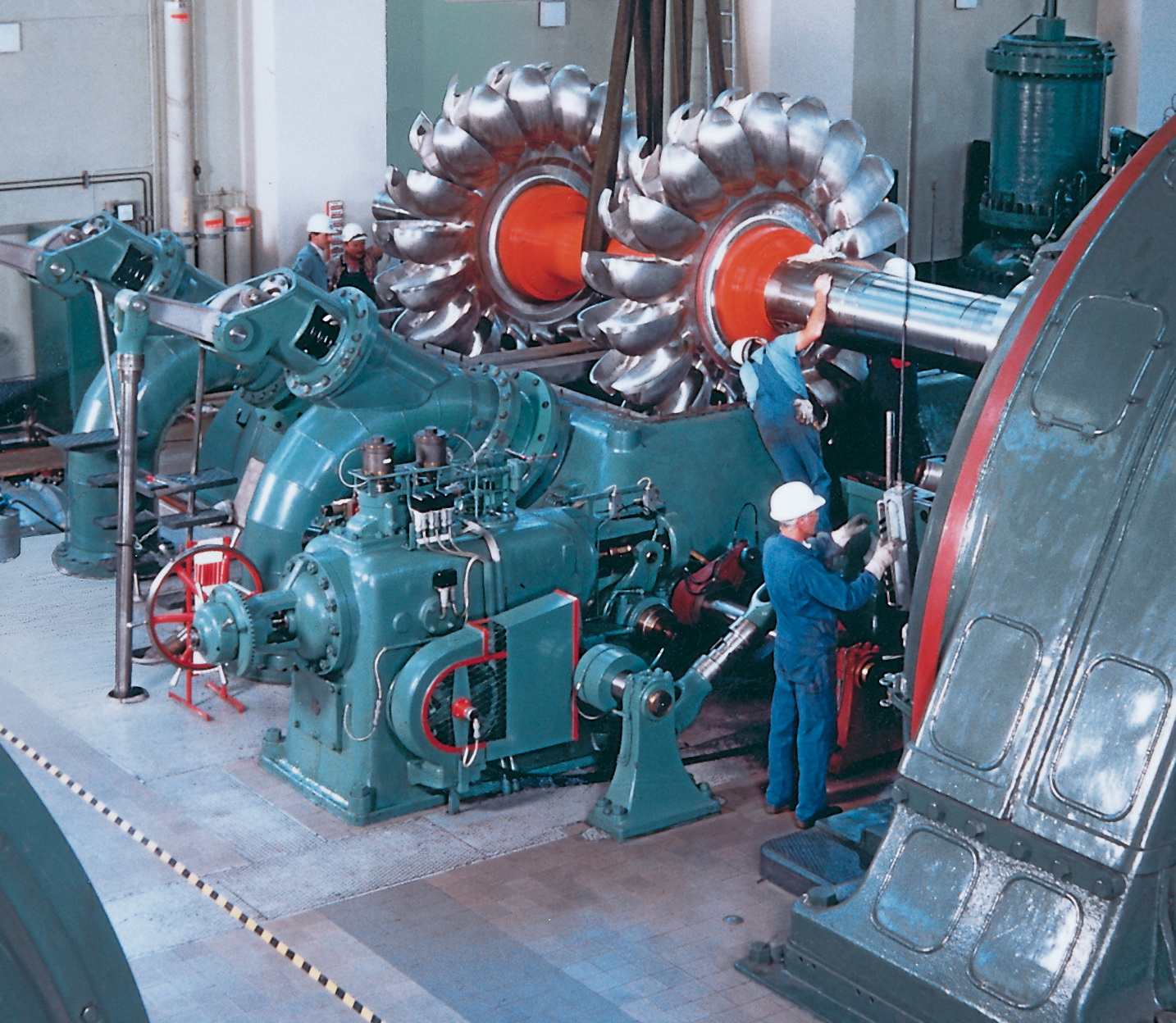
Assembly of a Pelton wheel at Walchensee Hydroelectric Power Station, Germany.

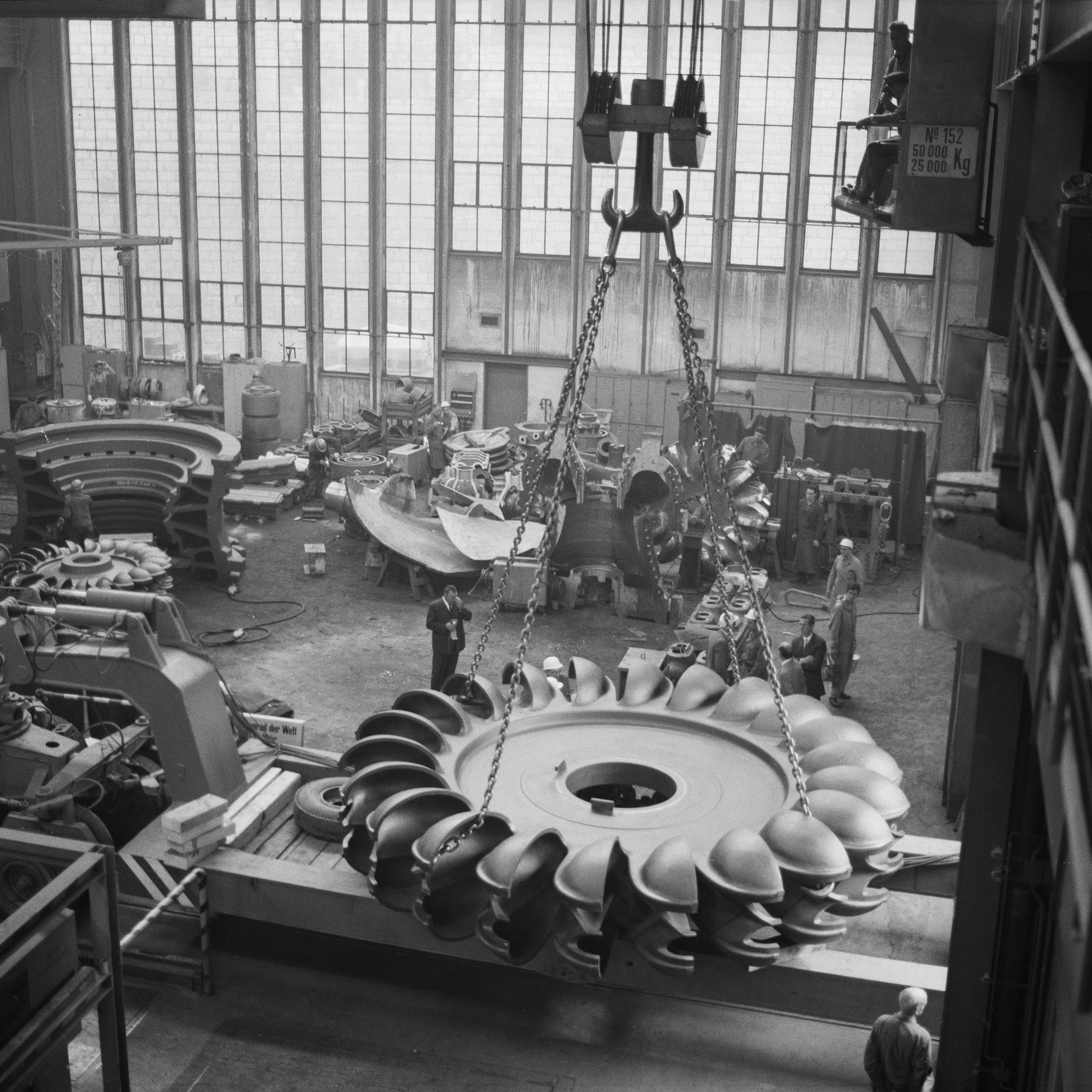
Pelton wheel for the New Colgate powerhouse in Yuba County, California

Bucket detail on a small turbine.

Pelton wheels are the preferred turbine for hydro-power where the available water source has relatively high hydraulic head at low flow rates. Pelton wheels are made in all sizes. There exist multi-ton Pelton wheels mounted on vertical oil pad bearings in hydroelectric plants. The largest units – the Bieudron Hydroelectric Power Station at the Grande Dixence Dam complex in Switzerland – are over 400 megawatts.

The smallest Pelton wheels are only a few inches across, and can be used to tap power from mountain streams having flows of a few gallons per minute. Some of these systems use household plumbing fixtures for water delivery. These small units are recommended for use with 30 metres (100 ft) or more of head, in order to generate significant power levels. Depending on water flow and design, Pelton wheels operate best with heads from 15–1,800 metres (50–5,910 ft), although there is no theoretical limit. Such "peltric sets", consisting of a Pelton wheel, an induction generator and a control mechanism, are used in Nepal.

== Design rules ==
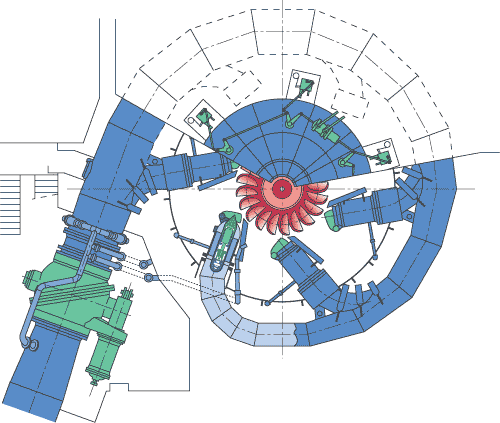
Sectional view of a Pelton turbine installation.

The specific speed $\eta_s$ parameter is independent of a particular turbine's size.

Compared to other turbine designs, the relatively low specific speed of the Pelton wheel implies that the geometry is inherently a "low gear" design. Thus it is most suitable to being fed by a hydro source with a low ratio of flow to pressure (meaning relatively low flow and/or relatively high pressure).

The specific speed is the main criterion for matching a specific hydro-electric site with the optimal turbine type. It also allows a new turbine design to be scaled from an existing design of known performance.

$\eta_s=n\sqrt{P}/\sqrt{ \rho}(gH)^{5/4}$ (dimensionless parameter),

where:

- $n$ = Frequency of rotation (rpm)
- $P$ = Power (W)
- $H$ = Water head (m)
- $\rho$ = Density (kg/m^{3})

The formula implies that the Pelton turbine is geared most suitably for applications with relatively high hydraulic head H, due to the 5/4 exponent being greater than unity, and given the characteristically low specific speed of the Pelton.

== Turbine physics and derivation ==
=== Energy and initial jet velocity ===
In the ideal (frictionless) case, all of the hydraulic potential energy (E_{p} = mgh) is converted into kinetic energy (E_{k} = mv^{2}/2) (see Bernoulli's principle). Equating these two equations and solving for the initial jet velocity (V_{i}) indicates that the theoretical (maximum) jet velocity is V_{i} = √2gh. For simplicity, assume that all of the velocity vectors are parallel to each other. Defining the velocity of the wheel runner as: (u), then as the jet approaches the runner, the initial jet velocity relative to the runner is: (V_{i} − u). The initial velocity of jet is V_{i}.

=== Final jet velocity ===
Assuming that the jet velocity is higher than the runner velocity, if the water is not to become backed-up in runner, then due to conservation of mass, the mass entering the runner must equal the mass leaving the runner. The fluid is assumed to be incompressible (an accurate assumption for most liquids). Also, it is assumed that the cross-sectional area of the jet is constant. The fluid impacts the runner, slowing down and transferring momentum from the jet to the wheel. Assuming no losses, the fluid leaving the runner's velocity is reduced by the velocity difference between the jet and the runner. The jet speed remains constant relative to the runner. So as the jet recedes from the runner, the jet velocity relative to the runner is: − (V_{i} − u) = −V_{i} + u. Note the minus sign indicates the reduction in stream velocity from impacting the runner. With the assumption that jet velocity is higher than runner velocity, the result is a "rebound" resulting in the jet flowing away from the runner. In the standard reference frame (relative to the earth), the final velocity is then: V_{f} = (−V_{i} + u) + u = −V_{i} + 2u.

The value V_{f} is bounded by two cases: a stationary runner and a runner moving at the velocity of the stream, V_{i}. For the stationary runner case, the stream velocity is -Vf, indicating the fluid fully reversed direction. In this case the force on the wheel is the highest (due to the largest possible velocity change), but power delivered is zero, since there is no movement. For the case where the runner is moving at the speed of the stream, the velocity of the wheel is the highest, but power delivered is also zero, since there is no torque or force imparted on the wheel (due to no change is stream velocity).

=== Optimal wheel speed ===
The ideal runner speed will cause all of the kinetic energy in the jet to be transferred to the wheel. In this case the final jet velocity must be zero. If −V_{i} + 2u = 0, then the optimal runner speed will be u = V_{i} /2, or half the initial jet velocity.

=== Torque ===
By Newton's second and third laws, the force F imposed by the jet on the runner is equal but opposite to the rate of momentum change of the fluid, so

F = −m(V_{f} − V_{i})/t = −ρQ[(−V_{i} + 2u) − V_{i}] = −ρQ(−2V_{i} + 2u) = 2ρQ(V_{i} − u),

where ρ is the density, and Q is the volume rate of flow of fluid. If D is the wheel diameter, the torque on the runner is.

T = F(D/2) = ρQD(V_{i} − u).

The torque is maximal when the runner is stopped (i.e. when u = 0, T = ρQDV_{i}). When the speed of the runner is equal to the initial jet velocity, the torque is zero (i.e., when u = V_{i}, then T = 0). On a plot of torque versus runner speed, the torque curve is a straight line between these two points: (0, pQDV_{i}) and (V_{i}, 0). Nozzle efficiency is the ratio of the jet power to the waterpower at the base of the nozzle.

=== Power ===
The power P = Fu = Tω, where ω is the angular velocity of the wheel. Substituting for F, we have P = 2ρQ(V_{i} − u)u. To find the runner speed at maximum power, take the derivative of P with respect to u and set it equal to zero, [dP/du = 2ρQ(V_{i} − 2u)]. Maximum power occurs when u = V_{i} /2. P_{max} = ρQV_{i}^{2}/2. Substituting the initial jet power V_{i} = √2gh, this simplifies to P_{max} = ρghQ. This quantity exactly equals the kinetic power of the jet, so in this ideal case, the efficiency is 100%, since all the energy in the jet is converted to shaft output.

=== Efficiency ===
A wheel power divided by the initial jet power, is the turbine efficiency, η = 4u(V_{i} − u)/V_{i}^{2}. It is zero for u = 0 and for u = V_{i}. As the equations indicate, when a real Pelton wheel is working close to maximum efficiency, the fluid flows off the wheel with very little residual velocity. In theory, the energy efficiency varies only with the efficiency of the nozzle and wheel, and does not vary with hydraulic head. The term "efficiency" can refer to hydraulic, mechanical, volumetric, wheel, or overall efficiency.

== System components ==
The conduit bringing high-pressure water to the impulse wheel is called the penstock. Originally the penstock was the name of the valve, but the term has been extended to include all of the fluid supply hydraulics. Penstock is now used as a general term for a water passage and control that is under pressure, whether it supplies an impulse turbine or not.

== See also ==
- Centrifugal pump
