= International Symposium on Alcohol Fuels =

The International Symposium on Alcohol Fuels (ISAF) is a non-profit international organization which gathers together specialists, technologists, executives and technical experts from alcohol, alcohol fuels, methanol, ethers and bio-fuel industries. ISAF came into being in 1976. The 2011 meeting (ISAF-XIX) was held in Verona, Italy. Subsequent conferences were held in Gwangju, Korea in 2015; Cartagena, Colombia in 2016; and Hangzhou, China in 2018.

== History ==
ISAF brings together technologists, technical experts, technology providers and executives in fields pertaining to the alcohol fuel industry, who share their ideas and consider solutions to the challenges ahead. ISAF discusses substitute energy sources like alcohol fuels and other alternative fuels like methanol, ethers, etc. ISAF furthers the cause of research, development and utilization of alcohol fuels to accelerate the exploitation of clean alternate fuels for vehicles and to reduce environmental pollution both from industrial and motor sources.

Reports and handbooks of the ISAF are frequently cited in scholarly articles and treatises about methanol and similar fuels.

== Conferences ==
ISAF symposia have been held in all the continents:

- Africa: South Africa
- Americas: Canada, Brazil, United States of America, Colombia
- Asia: China, Japan, Thailand, India, Korea
- Europe: Germany, France, Italy, Sweden
- Oceania: New Zealand

ISAF XVII was held in Taiyuan China in 2008. The ISAF Symposium is held every two years.

The theme of ISAF XVIII 2010 was "Innovation for local and global sustainability of alcohol fuels." Delegates discussed methodologies and technologies for production of alcohol fuels, and control of environmental pollution.

== See also ==
- Energy law
- Energy policy
