= List of waterfalls =

Niagara by Frederic Edwin Church (1857), portrays Canada's Horseshoe Falls

This list of notable waterfalls of the world is sorted by continent, then country, then province, state or territory. A waterfall is included if it is at least 15 m (50 ft) tall, or it is considered significant.

There is no standard way to measure the height or width of a waterfall. No ranking of waterfalls should be assumed because of the heights or widths provided in the list. Many numbers are estimated and measurements may be imprecise. See additional lists of waterfalls by height, flow rate and type.

== Africa ==
=== Angola ===
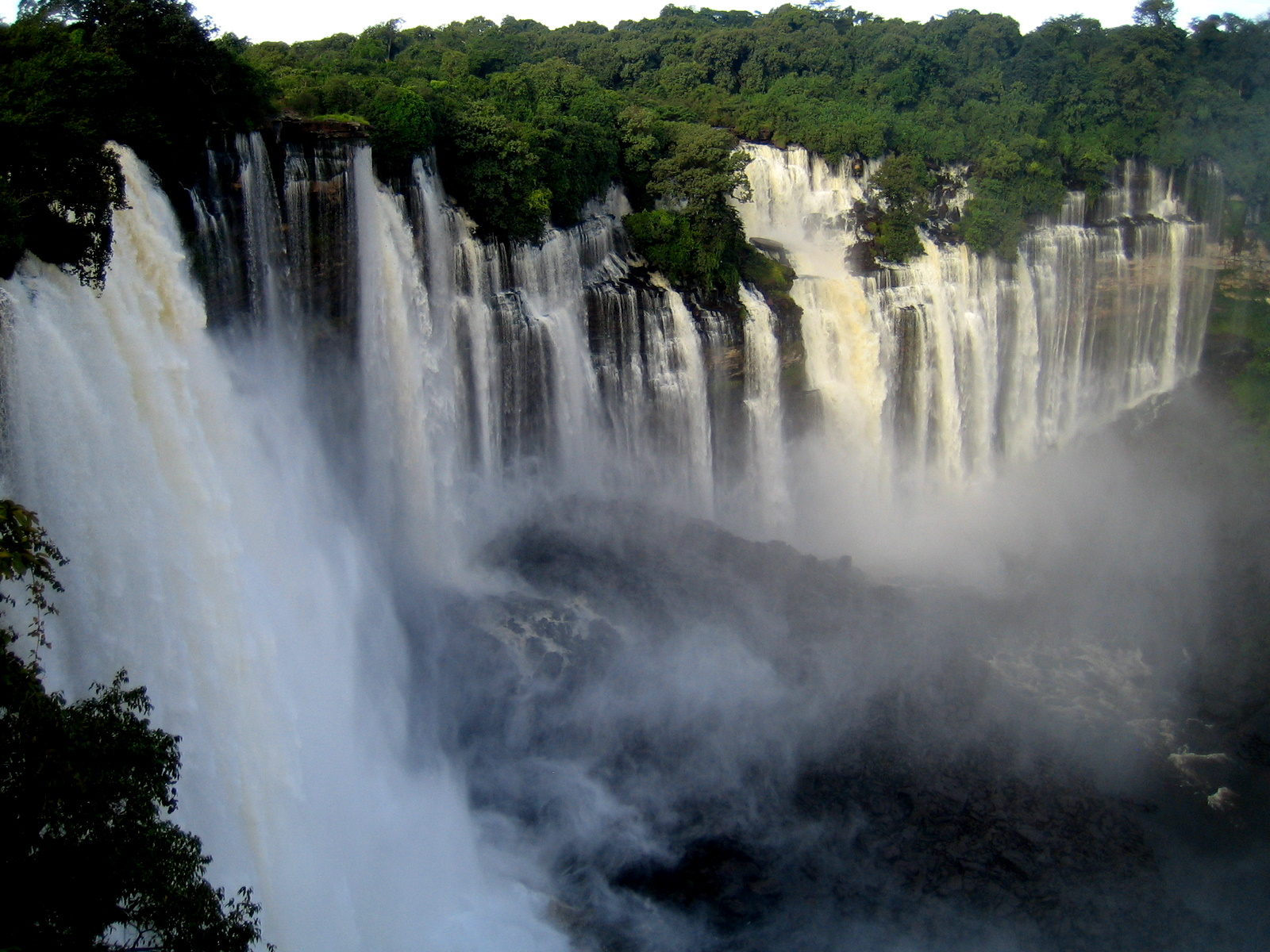
Kalandula Falls, Angola

- Kalandula Falls – 105 m (344 ft) high

=== Burundi ===
- Karera waterfalls
- Rusumo Falls

=== Central African Republic ===
- Boali Falls

=== Chad ===
- Gauthiot Falls

=== Democratic Republic of the Congo ===
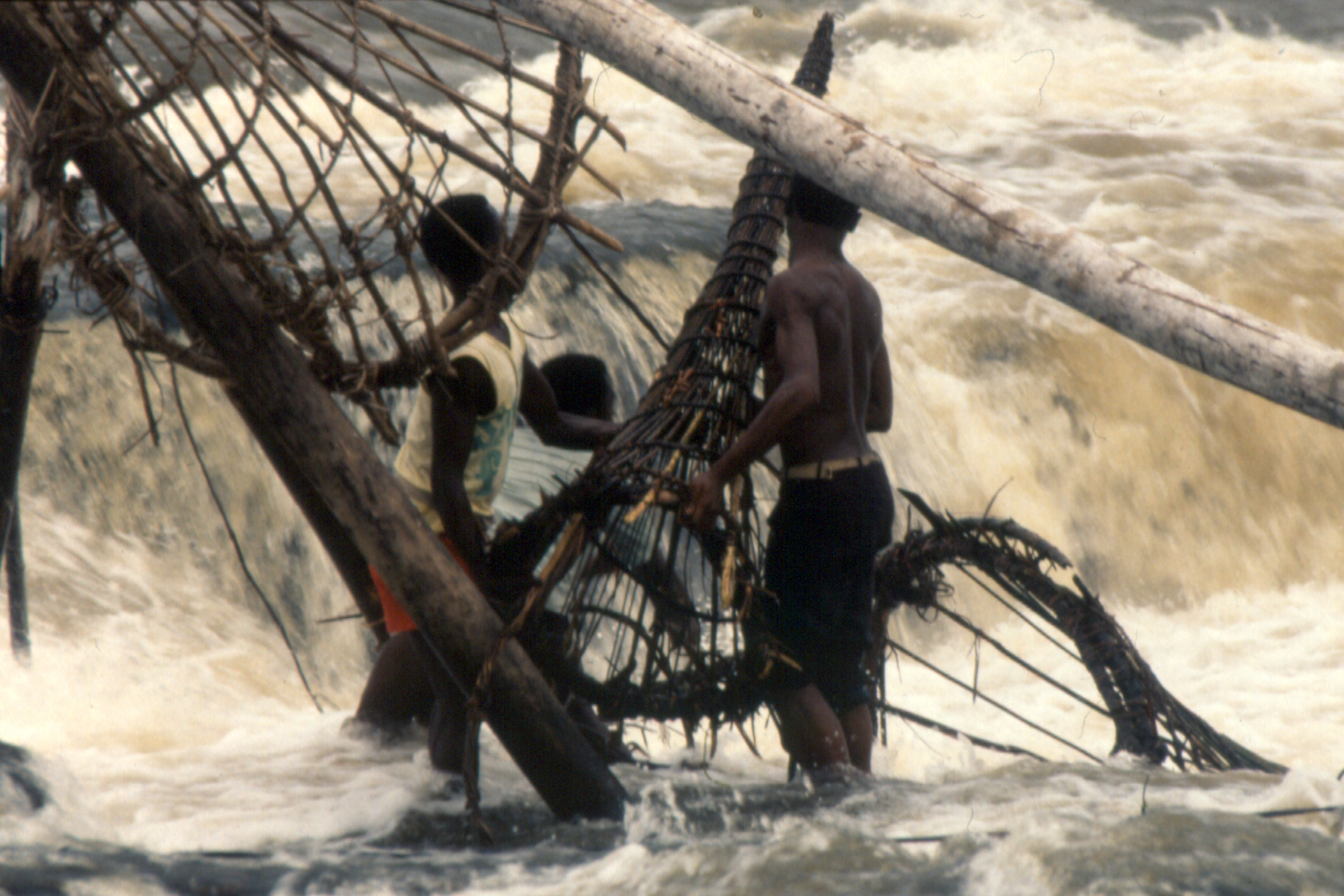
Boyoma Falls, Democratic Republic of the Congo

- Boyoma Falls – formerly known as Stanley Falls; highest flow rate in the world
- Inga Falls
- Livingstone Falls
- Lofoi Falls – 340 m (1,120 ft) high

=== Ethiopia ===
- Blue Nile Falls

=== Ghana ===
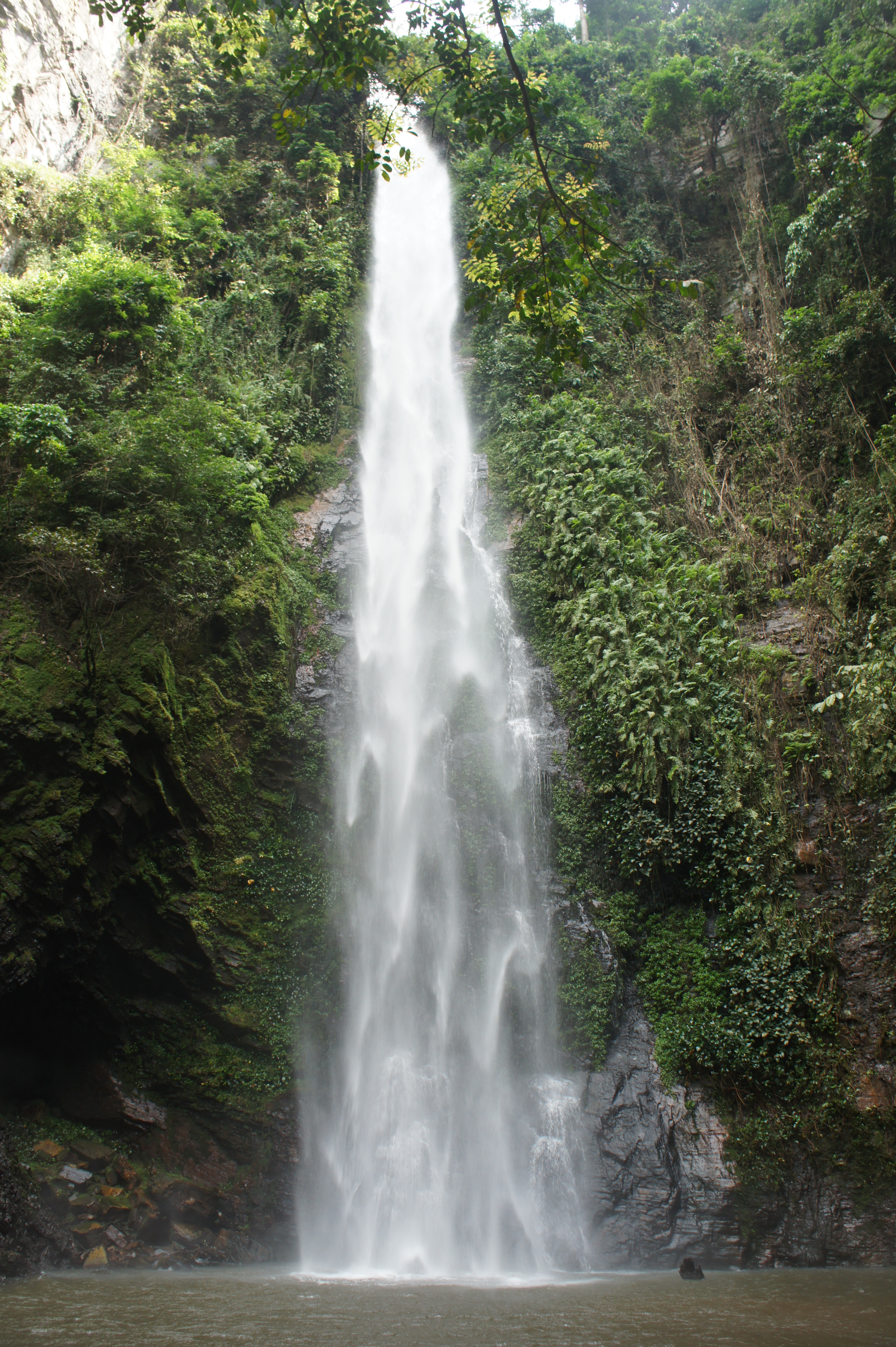
Tagbo Falls, Ghana

- Boti Falls
- Kintampo Falls
- Tagbo Falls
- Wli Falls
- Akaa falls

=== Guinea ===
- Tinkisso Falls

=== Kenya ===
- Karuru Falls
- Thomson's Falls

=== Lesotho ===
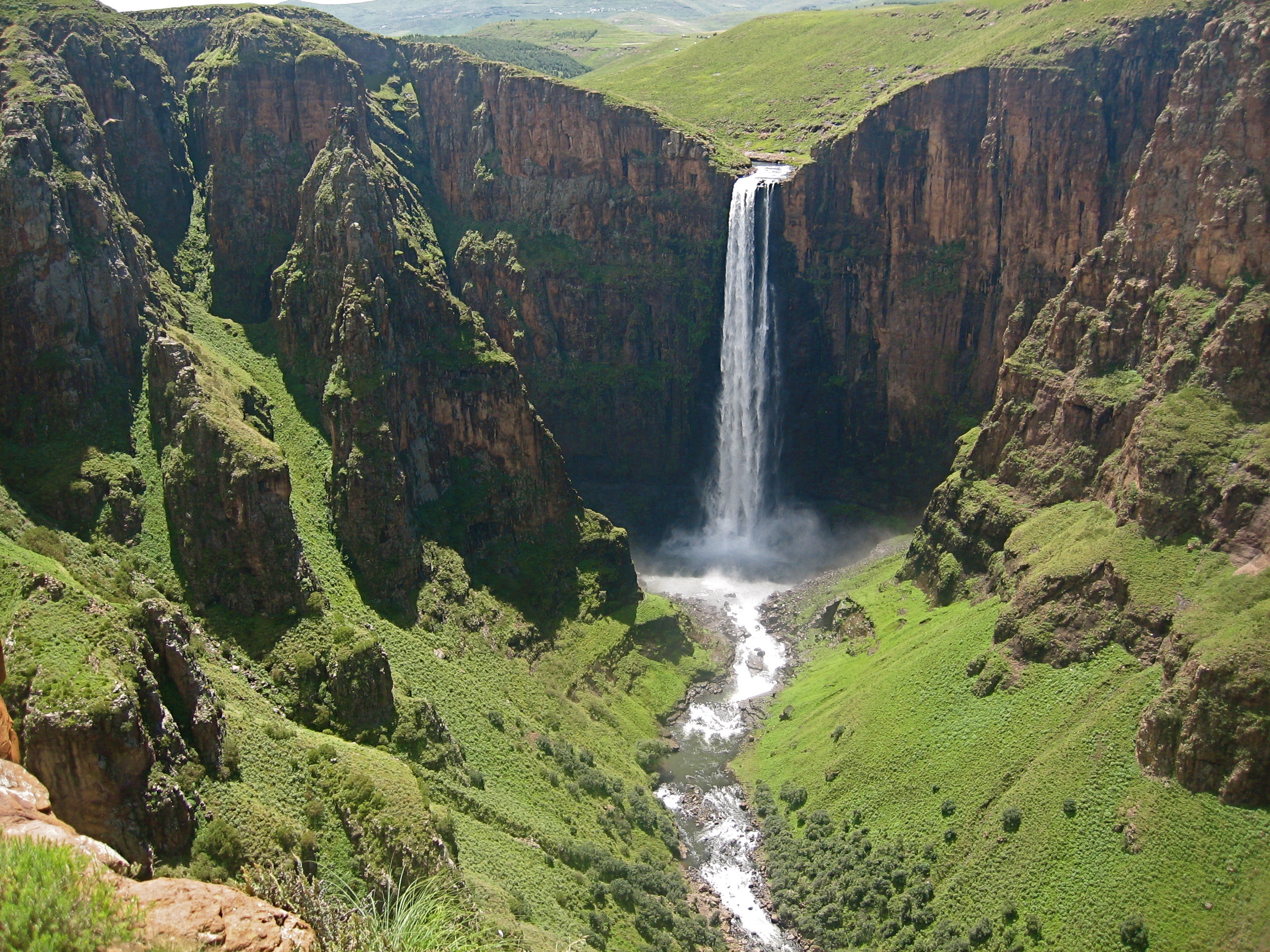
Maletsunyane Falls, Lesotho

- Maletsunyane Falls – 192 m (630 ft) high

=== Libya ===
- Derna Falls

=== Madagascar ===
- Andriamamovoka Falls
- Mahamanina Falls
- Mandraka Falls
- Rianbavy Falls
- Riandahy Falls
- Sakaleona Falls – 200 m (660 ft) high

=== Mali ===
- Gouina Falls

=== Morocco ===
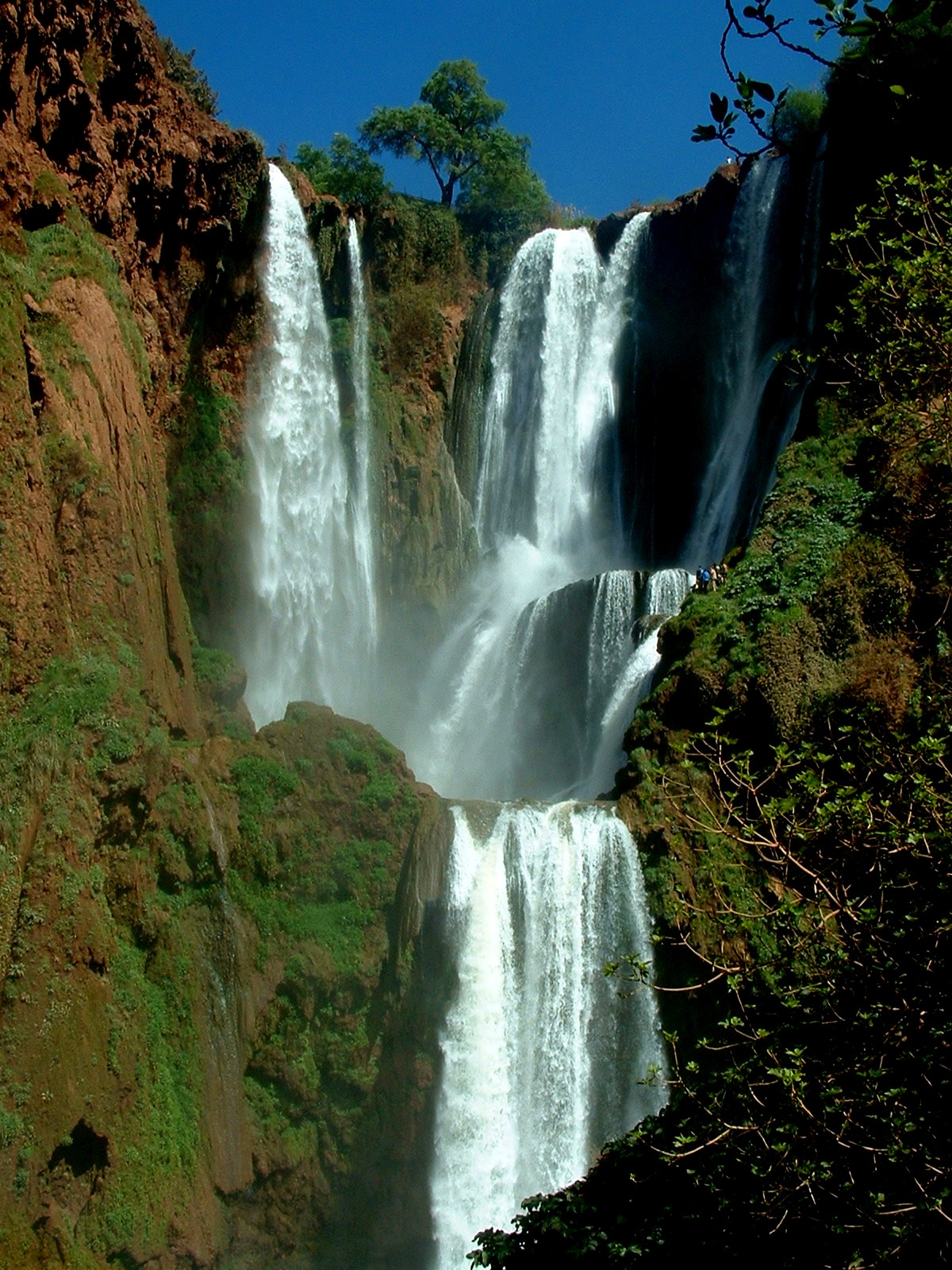
Ouzoud Falls, Morocco

- Ouzoud Falls – 110 m (360 ft) high

=== Namibia ===
- Epupa Falls
- Ruacana Falls – 120 m (390 ft) high

=== Nigeria ===
- Awhum Falls
- Erin-Ijesha Falls
- Agbokim Waterfalls
- Farin Ruwa Falls – 150 m (490 ft) high
- Gurara Falls
- Matsirga Falls
- Owu Falls
- Assop Falls

=== Réunion ===
- Trou de Fer Falls
- Grand Galet Falls

=== Rwanda ===
- Rusumo Falls

=== Somalia ===
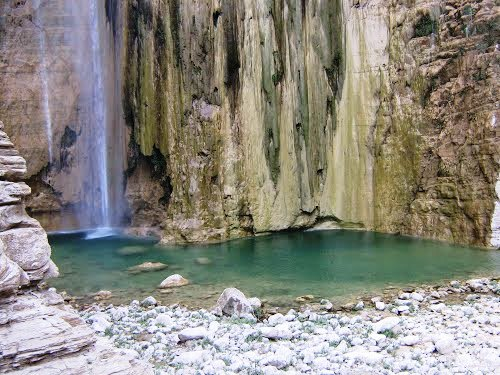
Lamadaya falls in Sanaag, Somalia

- Lamadaya Falls

=== South Africa ===
==== KwaZulu-Natal ====
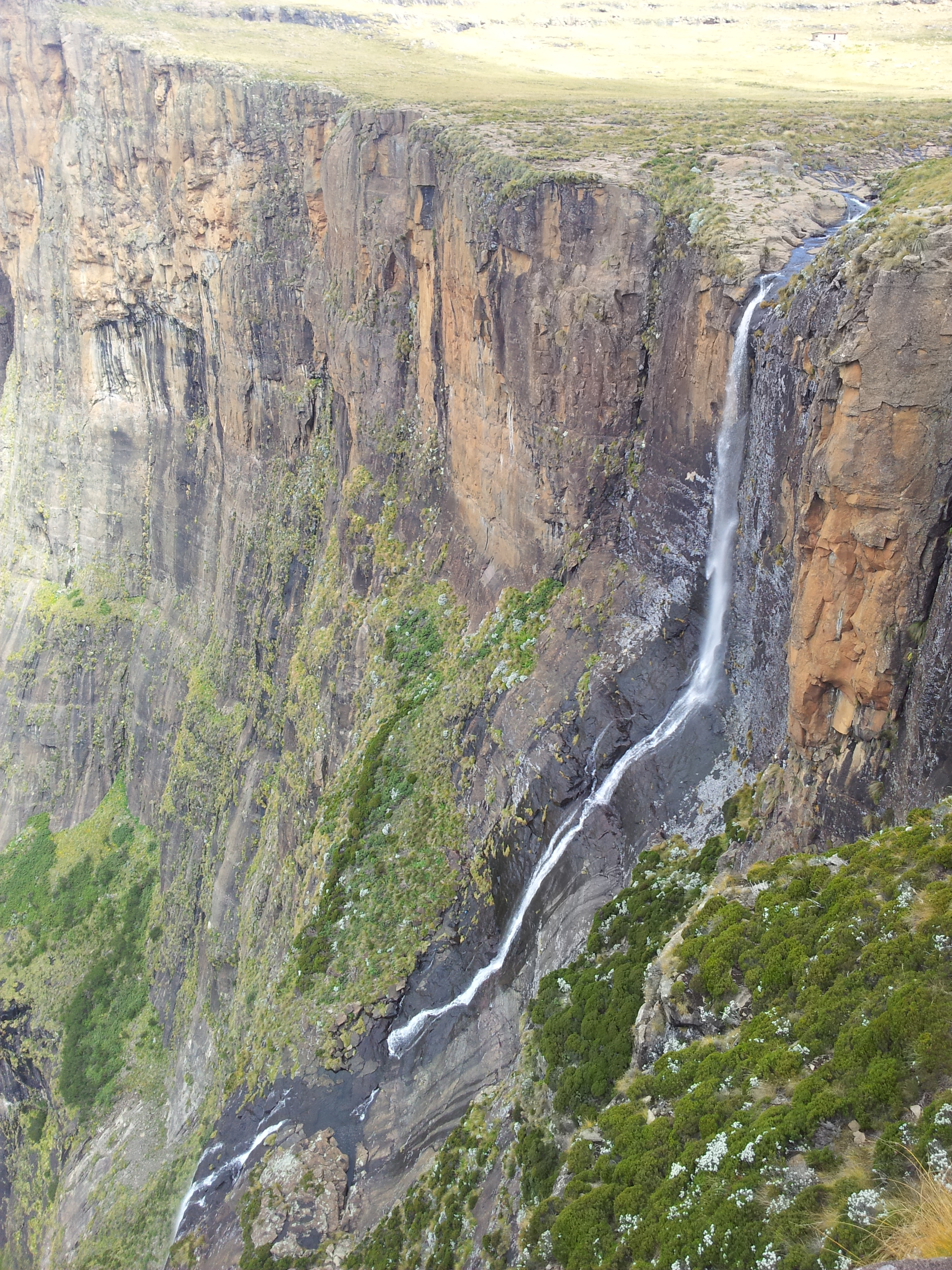
Tugela Falls, South Africa

- Howick Falls
- Ncandu Falls
- Tugela Falls – 948 m (3,110 ft) high, the highest waterfall in Africa

==== Mpumalanga ====
- Berlin Falls
- Bridal Veil Falls – 146 m (479 ft) high
- Lisbon Falls
- Lone Creek Falls
- Mac-Mac Falls

==== Northern Cape ====
- Augrabies Falls

=== Tanzania ===
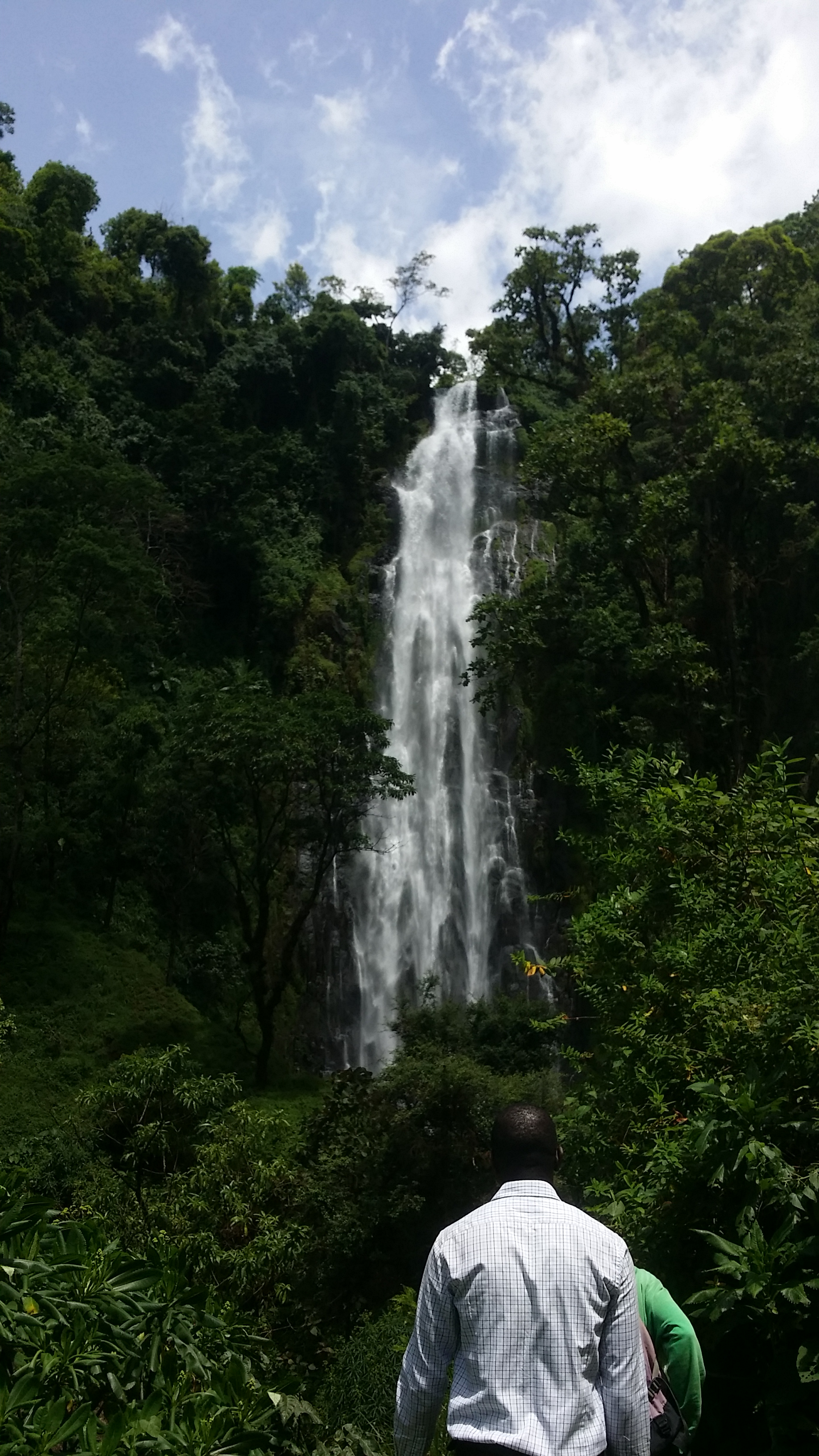
Materuni Waterfalls, Tanzania

- Kalambo Falls – 235 m (771 ft) high
- Materuni Waterfalls
- Rusumo Falls

=== Uganda ===
- Murchison Falls
- Sipi Falls

=== Zambia ===
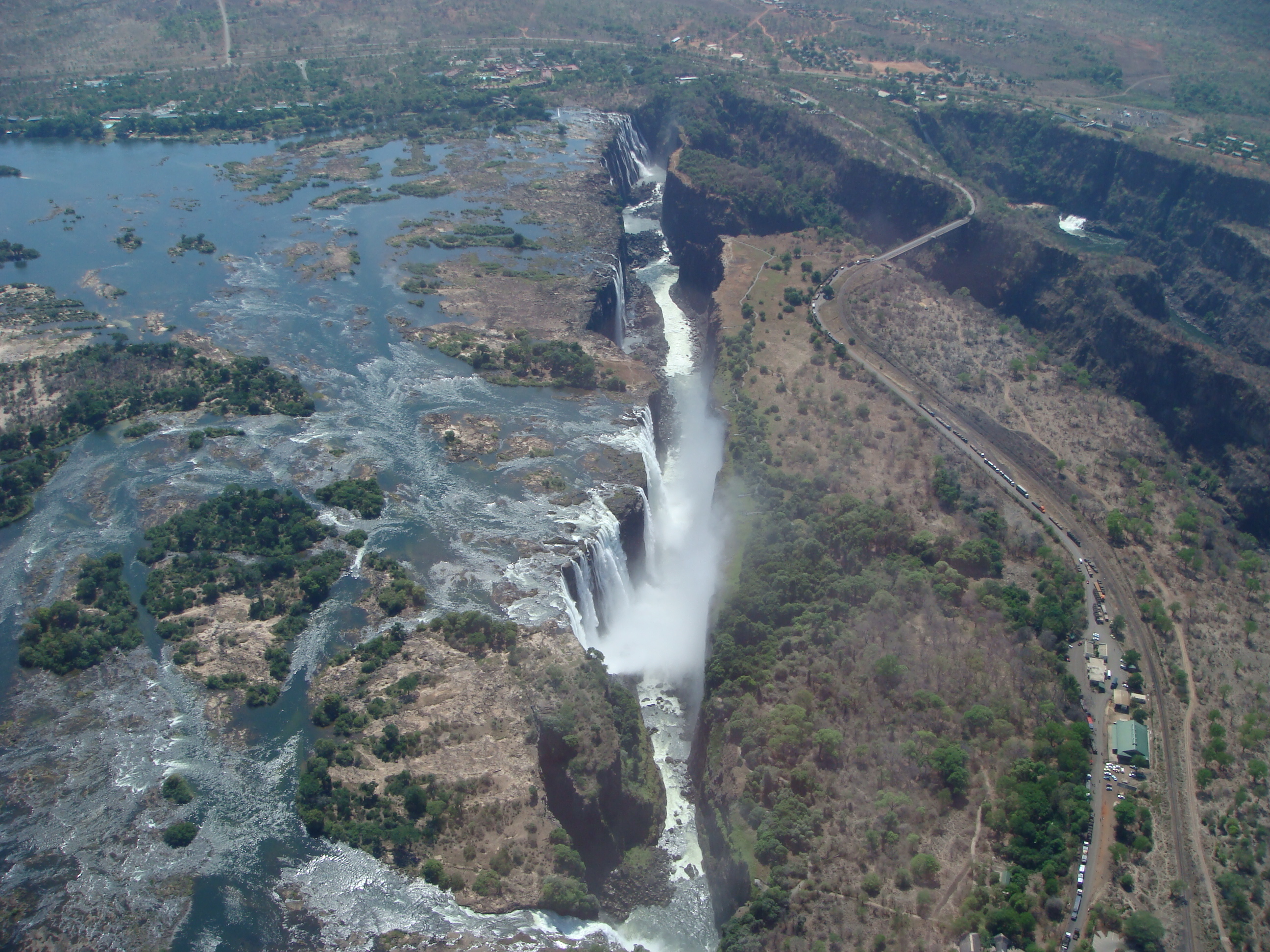
Victoria Falls, Zambia / Zimbabwe border, Africa – largest sheet of falling water in the world, width by height

- Chavuma Falls
- Chisimba Falls
- Kabwelume Falls
- Kalambo Falls – see Tanzania above
- Kundalila Falls
- Lumangwe Falls
- Mambilima Falls
- Mumbuluma Falls
- Mutumuna Falls
- Ngonye Falls
- Ntumbachushi Falls
- Nyambwezi Falls
- Victoria Falls — see Zimbabwe below

=== Zimbabwe ===
- Mutarazi Falls – 762 m (2,500 ft) high; highest in Zimbabwe, second highest in Africa and 17th highest in the world
- Victoria Falls – 108 m (354 ft) high; widest in Africa and one of the widest in the world

== Asia ==
=== Bangladesh ===
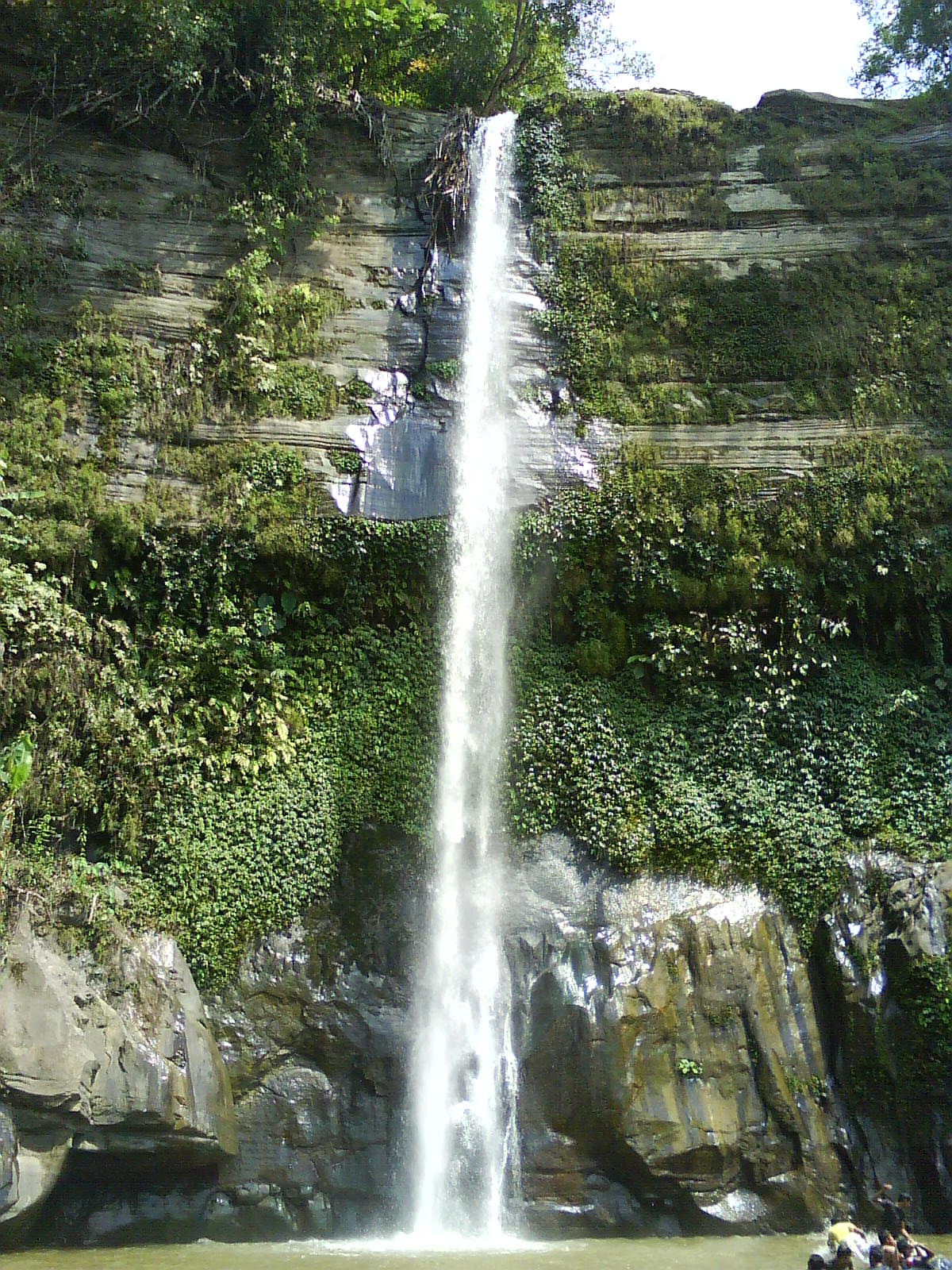
Madhabkunda Falls, Bangladesh

- Hum Hum Falls
- Jadipai Falls
- Madhabkunda Falls
- Nafa-khum Falls

=== Cambodia ===
- Ka Choung Falls
- Kbal Chhay Falls
- Kulen Falls
- Tuek Chhu Falls
- Popokvil Falls
- Bou Sra Falls

=== China ===
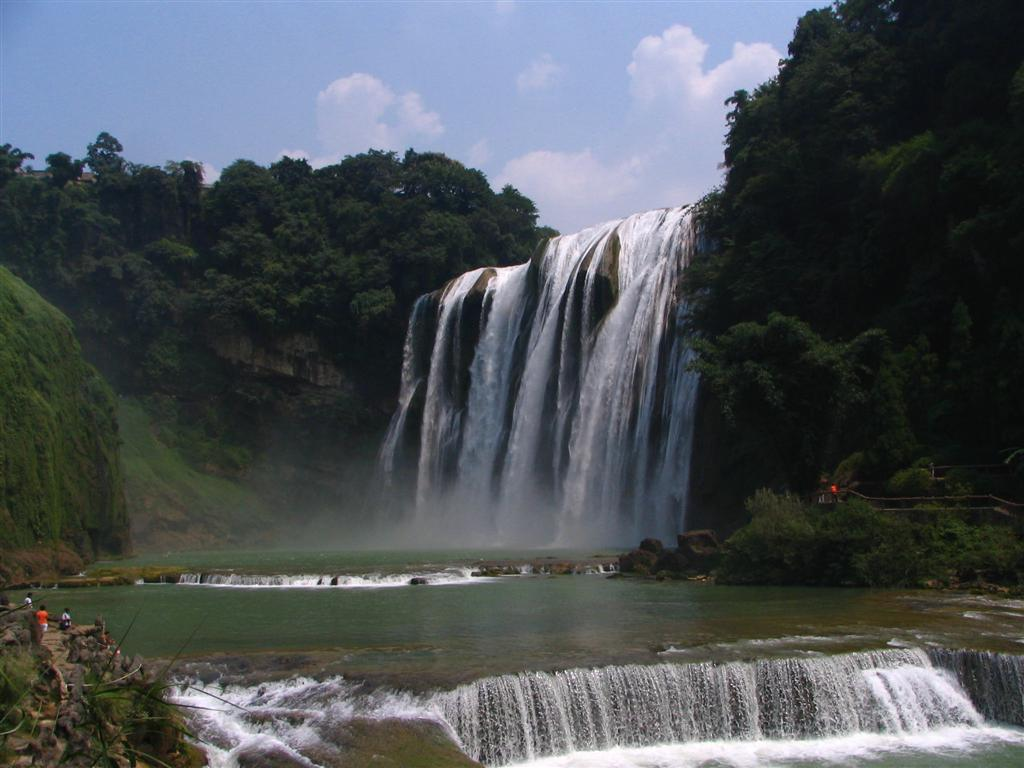
Huangguoshu Falls, China

- Ban Gioc–Detian Falls – Karst Hills, Daxin County, Chongzuo Prefecture, Guangxi Province; Asia's largest transnational waterfall, shared between China and Vietnam
- Huangguoshu Falls – Anshun, Guizhou provinces; 74 m (243 ft) high, 81 m (266 ft) wide
- Hukou Falls – borders Shaanxi and Shanxi provinces; 50 m (160 ft) high; 30 m (98 ft) wide; second-largest waterfall in China
- Pearl Shoal Falls – Jiuzhaigou, Sichuan
- Changbai Waterfall – Jilin province; 68 m (223 ft) high
- Huangmanzhai waterfalls – Guangdong province; 56 m (184 ft) high; 82 m (269 ft) wide
- Dalongqiu Waterfall – Zhejiang province; 197 metres (646 ft)

=== East Timor ===
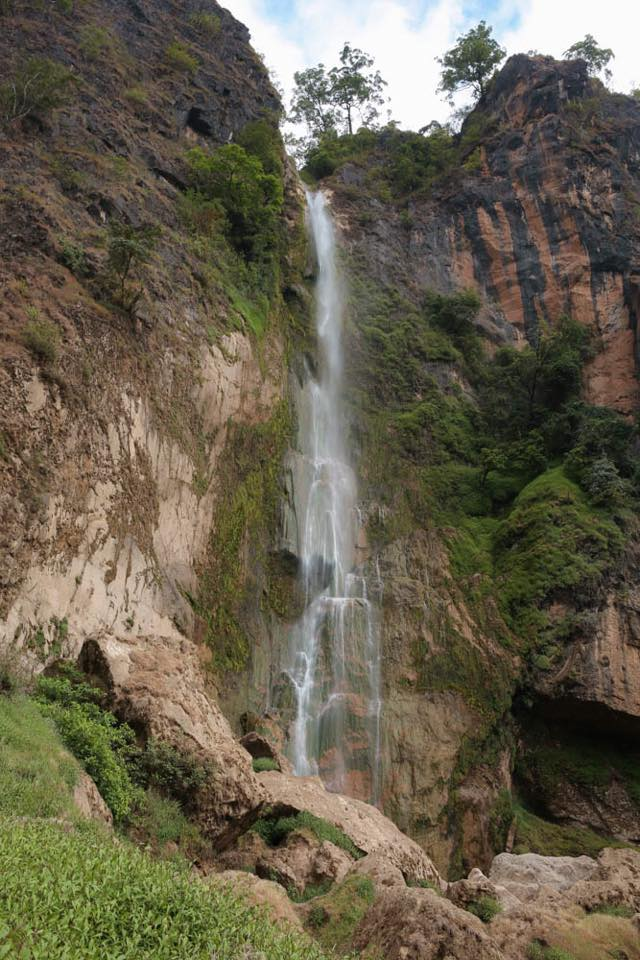
Bandeira Falls, East Timor

- Bandeira Falls – near Atsabe
- Berloi Falls – Fatisi

=== Hong Kong ===
- Waterfall Bay – near Aberdeen, Hong Kong Island; historically known for replenishing British merchant ships with its water

=== India ===
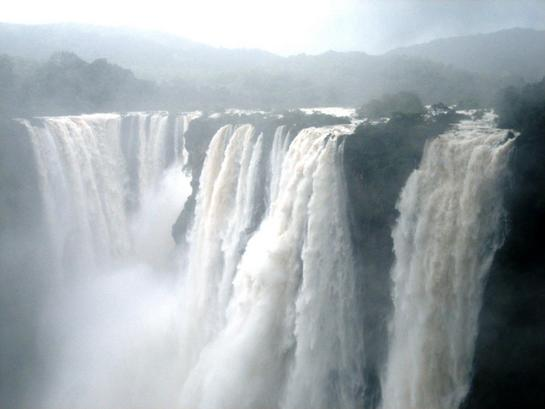
Jog Falls, India during monsoon

- Agaya Gangai Falls
- Aruvikkuzhy Falls
- Athirappilly Falls
- Barkana Falls
- Catherine Falls
- Chachai Falls
- Chitrakote Falls – also called Chitrakoot or Chitrakot Falls
- Chunchanakatte Falls
- Courtallam Falls – also called Kutralam Falls
- Dhuandhar Falls
- Dudhsagar Falls
- Duduma Falls
- Godchinamalaki Falls
- Gokak Falls
- Hebbe Falls
- Hogenakkal Falls
- Irupu Falls – also called Iruppu Falls
- Jog Falls – also called Joga or Gerosoppa Falls
- Jonha Falls
- Khandadhar Falls – Kendujhar district
- Khandadhar Falls – Sundergarh district
- Kiliyur Falls
- Kunchikal Falls – 455 m (1,493 ft)
- Kutladampatti Falls
- Lodh Falls – also called Burhaghat Falls
- Magod Falls
- Meenmutty Falls – Thiruvananthapuram district
- Meenmutty Falls – Wayanad district
- Nohkalikai Falls
- Sathodi Falls
- Thalaiyar Falls – also called Rat Tail Falls
- Thoseghar Falls
- Unchalli Falls – also called Lushington Falls
- Vajrai Falls – 560 m (1,840 ft)
- Vajrapoha Falls
- Vazhachal Falls

=== Indonesia ===
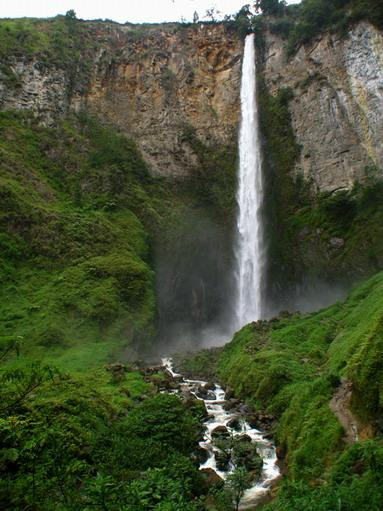
Sipisopiso Falls, Indonesia

- Gitgit Falls
- Jaksa Falls
- Sedudo Falls
- Sipisopiso Falls
- Moramo Waterfalls
- Telun Berasap Falls
- Tumpak Sewu Waterfalls

=== Iran ===
- Laton Waterfall – 105 m (344 ft), tallest waterfall in Iran
- Margoon Falls
- Bisheh Waterfall
- Shirabad Waterfall
- Gerit Waterfall
- Nojian Waterfall

=== Japan ===
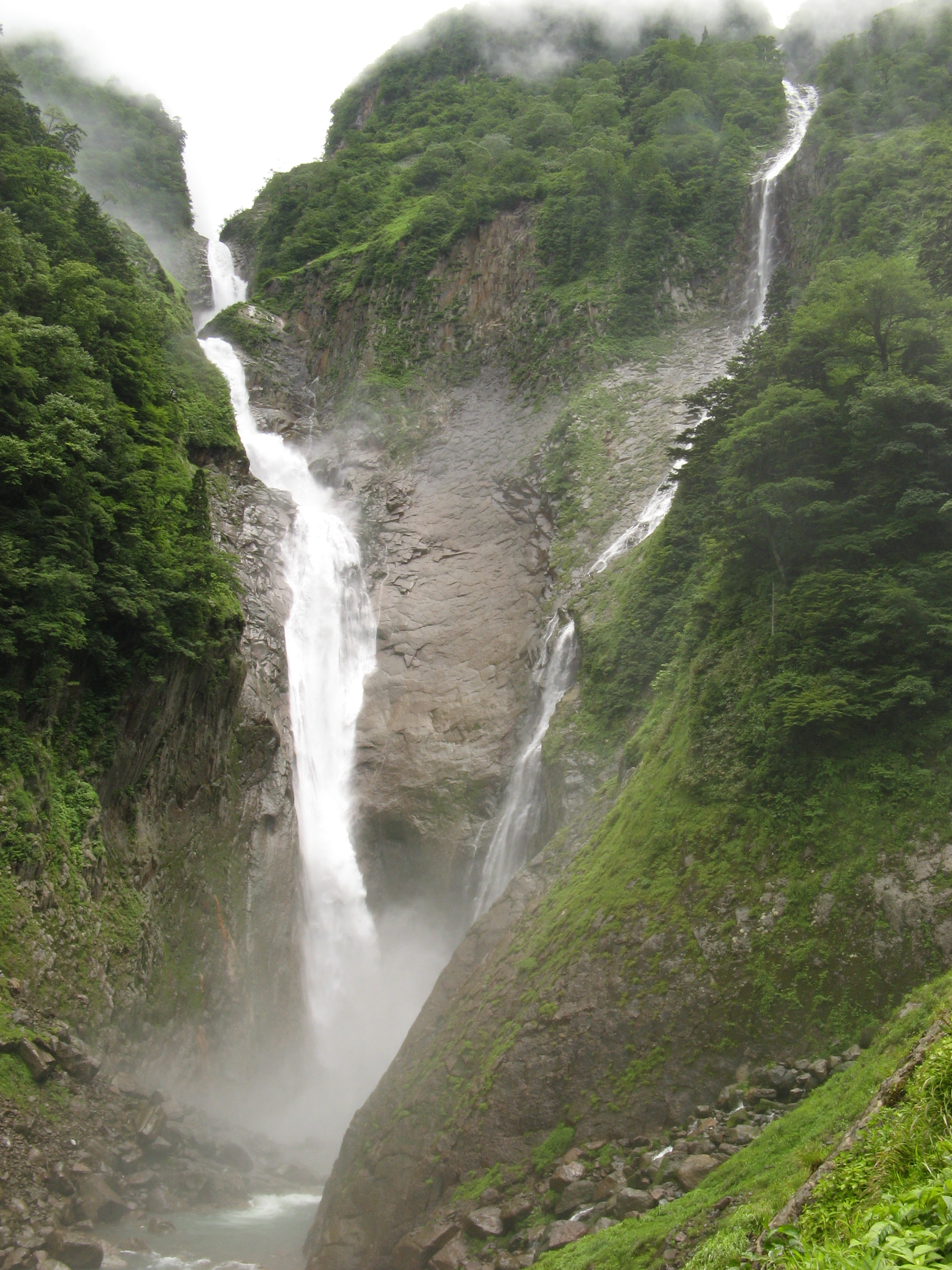
Shōmyō and Hannoki Falls, Japan

- Abe Great Falls – 80 m (260 ft) high
- Fukuroda Falls – 120 m (390 ft) high
- Hannoki Falls – 497 m (1,631 ft) high; the tallest falls in Japan; only flows from April to July; twin falls with Shōmyō Falls
- Kegon Falls – 97 m (318 ft); infamous for suicides
- Nachi Falls – 133 m (436 ft)
- Nunobiki Falls – 120 m (390 ft) in four cascades, of great cultural significance, considered a meisho, or "famous site"
- Shōmyō Falls – 350 m (1,150 ft) high; the tallest year-round waterfall in Japan

=== Kyrgyzstan ===
- Abshir Ata Falls
- Barskoon Falls

=== Laos ===
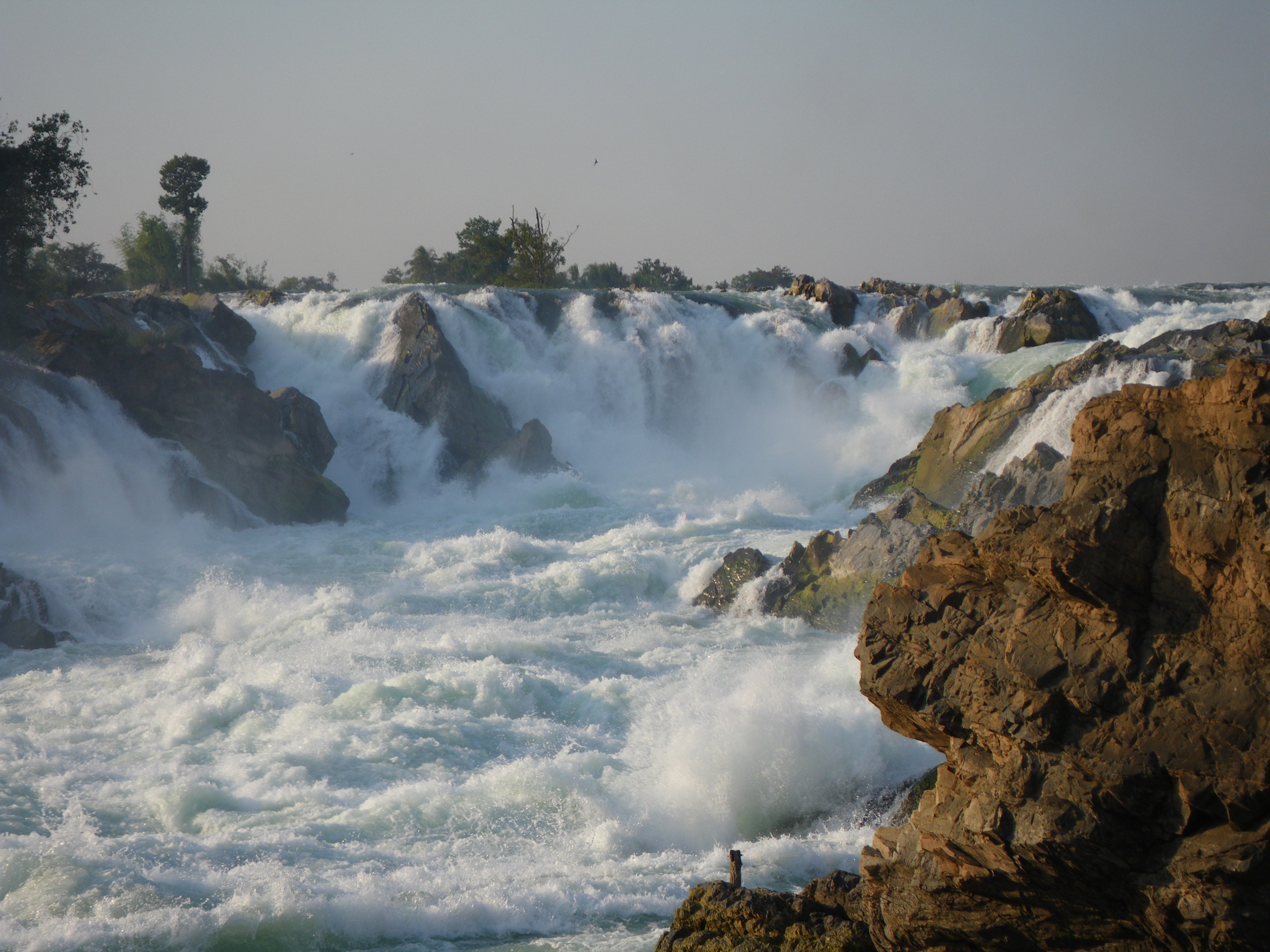
Khone Phapheng Falls, Laos – highest flow rate in Asia

- Khone Phapheng Falls – southeast Asia's biggest waterfall by volume

=== Malaysia ===
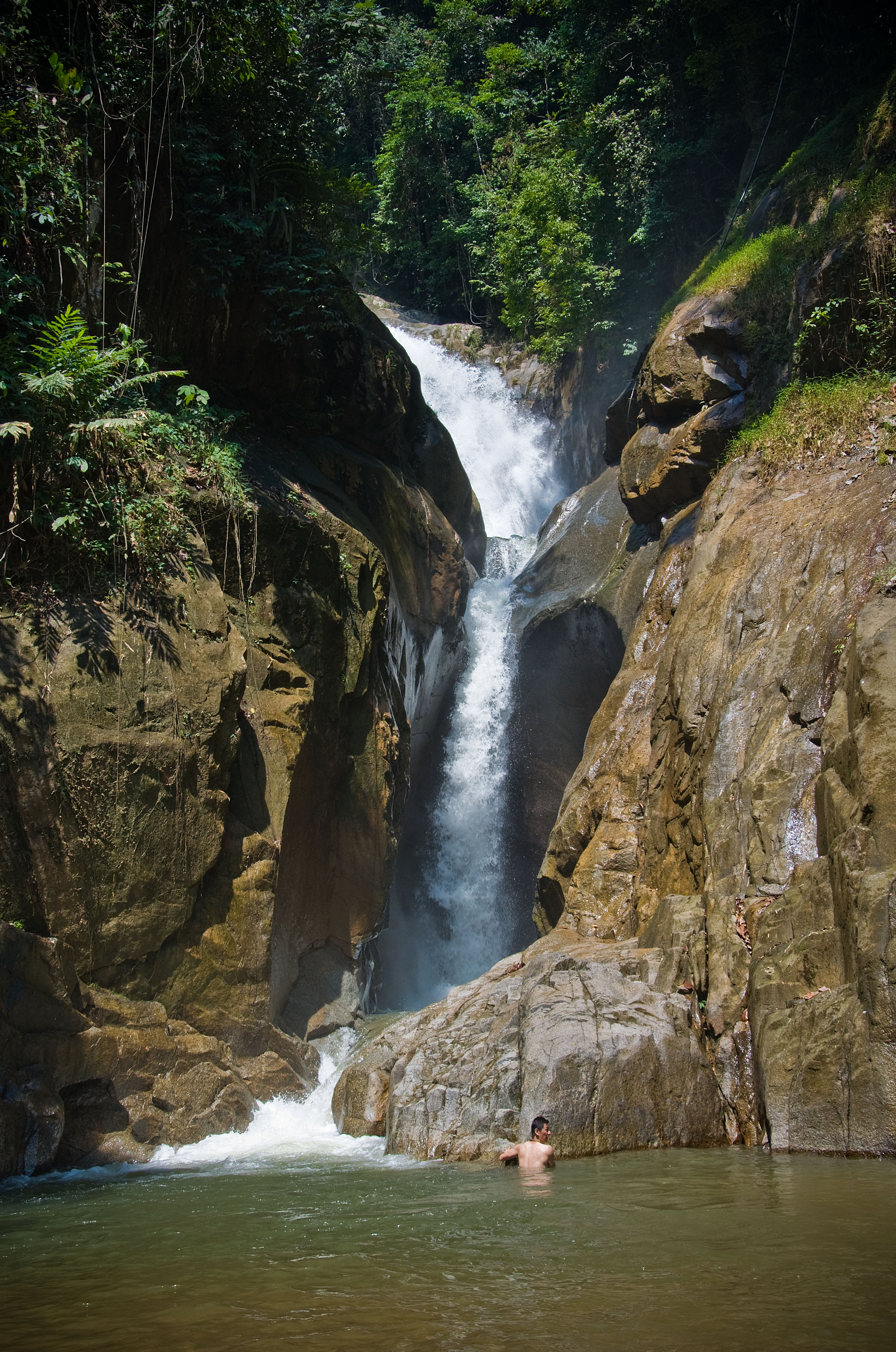
Chiling waterfalls, Malaysia

- Berkelah Falls
- Cemerung Falls
- Chiling Falls
- Gabai Falls
- Kadamaian Falls – 700 m (2,300 ft) high; the tallest waterfall in southeast Asia
- Kanching Falls
- Kota Tinggi Falls
- Mahua Falls
- Maliau Falls
- Takob Akob Falls

=== Mongolia ===
Ulaan Tsutgalan Waterfall, Mongolia

- Ulaan Tsutgalan Waterfall – 24 m (79 ft) high

=== Nepal ===
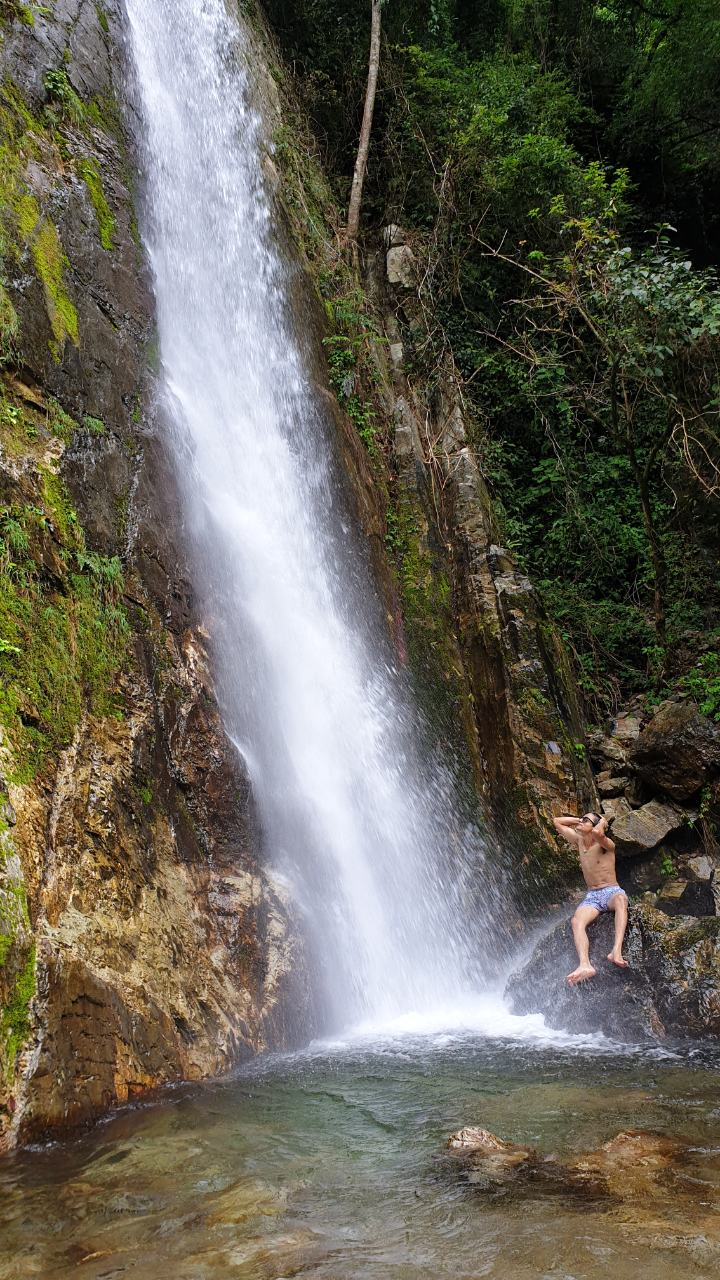
Simba waterfall, Nepal (also known as Manikhel)

- Davis Falls
- Hyatung Falls
- Jhor waterfall
- Lamo waterfall
- Mohini waterfall
- Namaste Falls
- Narchyang waterfall
- Pachal waterfall
- Pokali waterfall
- Purandhara waterfall
- Rupse Falls
- Simba waterfall
- Tindhare Waterfall
- Todke waterfall

=== North Korea ===
- Ullim Falls

=== Pakistan ===
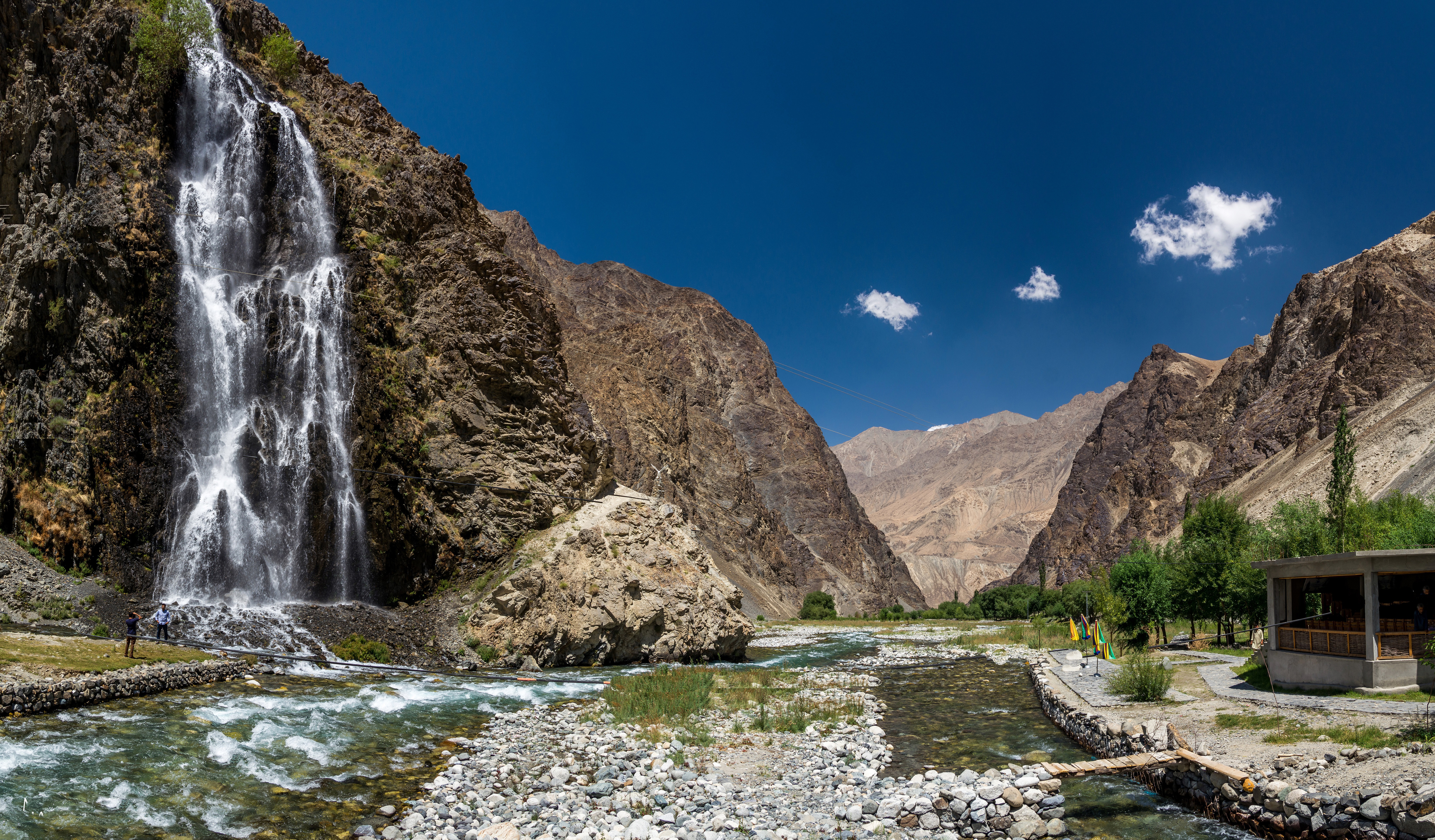
Manthokha Falls, Pakistan

- Dhani Falls
- Jarogo Falls
- Manthokha Falls
- Pir Ghaib Falls
- Sajikot Falls

=== Philippines ===
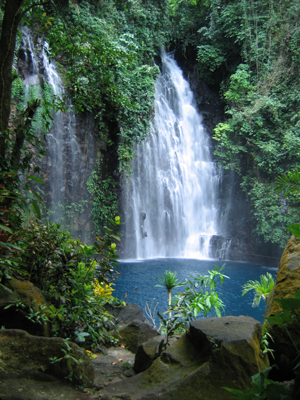
Tinago Falls, Philippines

- Abaga Falls
- Asik-Asik Falls
- Dodiongan Falls
- Hinulugang Taktak Falls
- Kaytitinga Falls
- Limunsudan Falls
- Maria Cristina Falls
- Pagsanjan Falls
- Pinandagatan Falls
- Tinago Falls
- Tinuy-an Falls
- Tudaya Falls

=== Russia (Siberia) ===
- Ilya Muromets Falls – 141 m (463 ft)
- Kinzelyuk Falls – 328 m (1,076 ft)
- Talnikovy Falls – 482 m (1,581 ft)

=== Singapore ===
- Cloud Forest – 35 m (115 ft); an artificial waterfall
- Jurong Falls – 30 m (98 ft) high; an artificial waterfall
- Rain Vortex – 40 m (131 ft); reputedly, the tallest indoor artificial waterfall in the world

=== South Korea ===
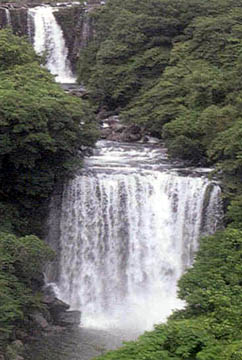
The first two falls of Cheonjeyeon Falls, Jeju Province, South Korea

- Cheonjeyeon Falls
- Cheonjiyeon Falls
- Jeongbang Falls
- Towangseong Falls – 320 m (1,049 ft) high; the highest waterfall in South Korea

=== Sri Lanka ===
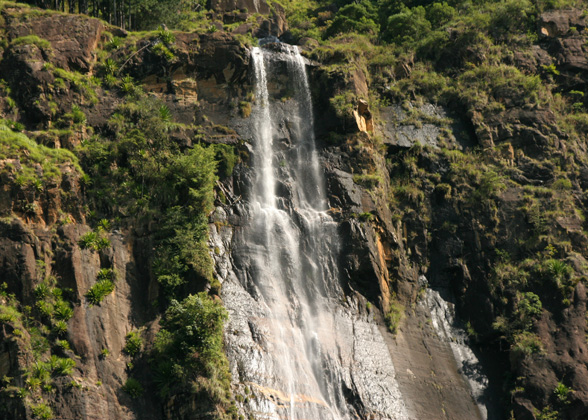
Bambarakanda Falls, Sri Lanka

- Bambarakanda Falls – 263 m (863 ft) high; the highest waterfall in Sri Lanka
- Bomburu Ella Falls – located near Welimada
- Devon Falls – located near Talawakelle
- Diyaluma Falls – 220 m (720 ft) high
- St. Clair's Falls – one of the widest waterfalls in Sri Lanka

=== Taiwan ===
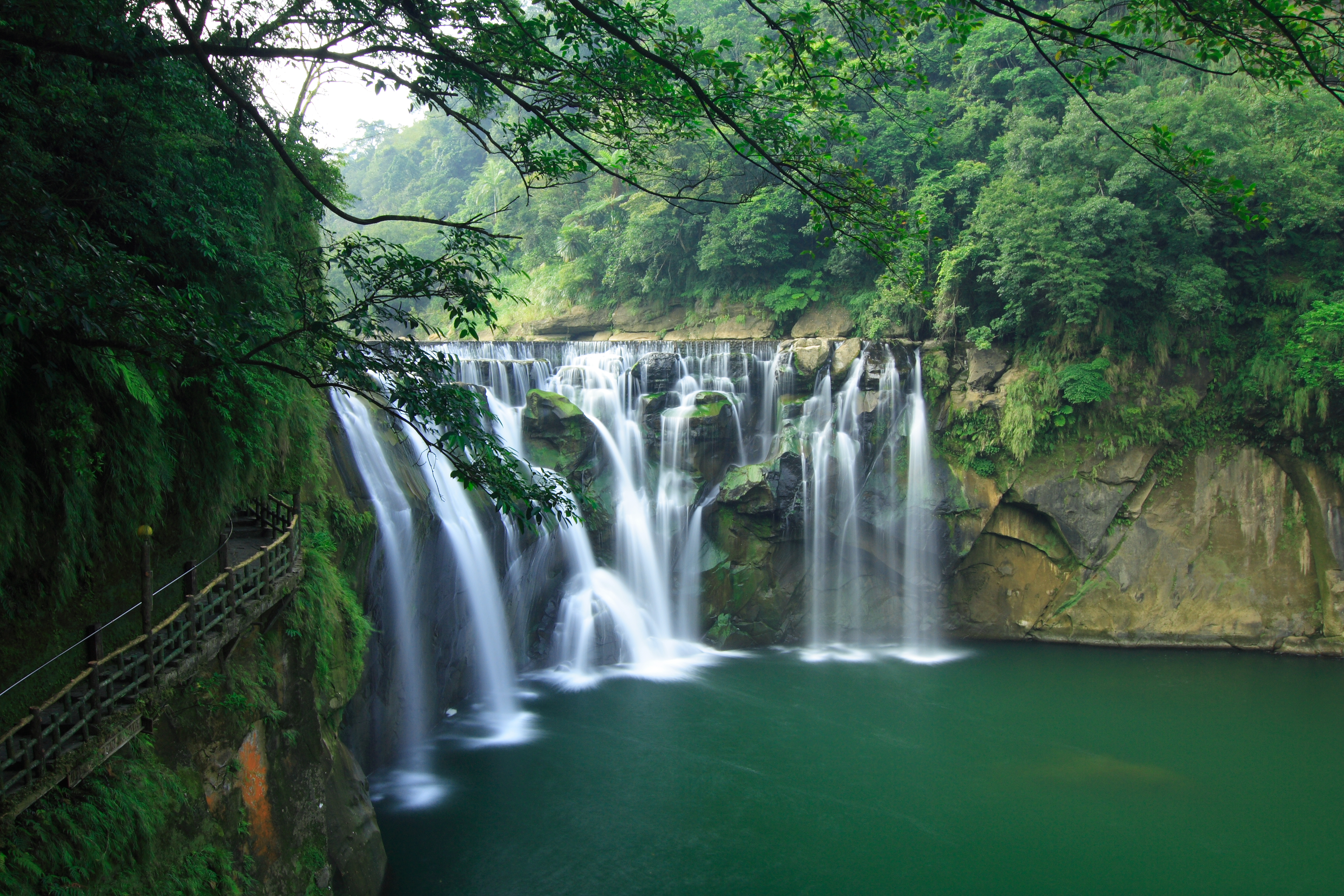
Shifen Falls, Taiwan

- Golden Falls
- Jiao Lung Falls – 600 m (2,000 ft) high; the tallest waterfall in Taiwan
- Lingjiao Falls
- Penglai Falls
- Shifen Falls – 40 m (130 ft) wide; the widest waterfall in Taiwan
- Taoshan Falls
- Wufengqi Falls
- Wulai Falls
- Yuntan Falls

=== Thailand ===
- Mae Surin Falls
- Mae Ya Waterfall
- Phu Fa Falls
- Thi Lo Su Falls
- Wachirathan Falls

=== Turkey ===
- Düden Falls – Antalya
- Göksu Falls – Sivas
- Gürlevik Falls – Erzincan
- Kurşunlu Falls – Antalya
- Manavgat Falls in Antalya
- Tortum Falls – Erzurum

=== Vietnam ===
- Ban Gioc–Detian Falls – 30 m (98 ft) high; along the border with China

== Europe ==
=== Austria ===
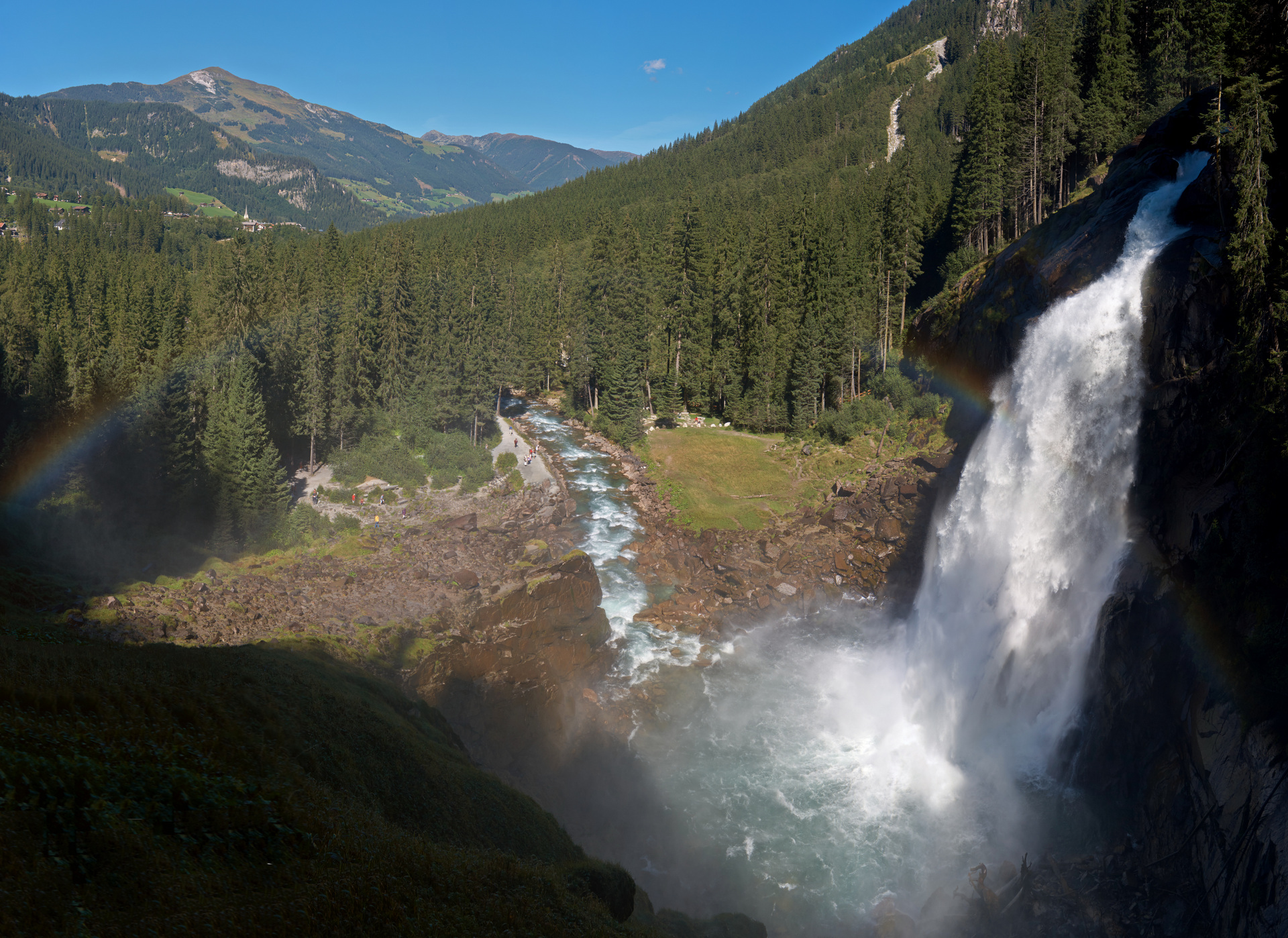
Krimml Falls, Austria

- Krimml Falls – 380 m (1,250 ft), highest waterfall in Austria

=== Bosnia and Herzegovina ===
- Bliha Falls – 56 m (184 ft)
- Kravice Falls – 25 m (82 ft)
- Pliva Falls – 22 m (72 ft)
- Skakavac Falls – Perućica, 75 m (246 ft)

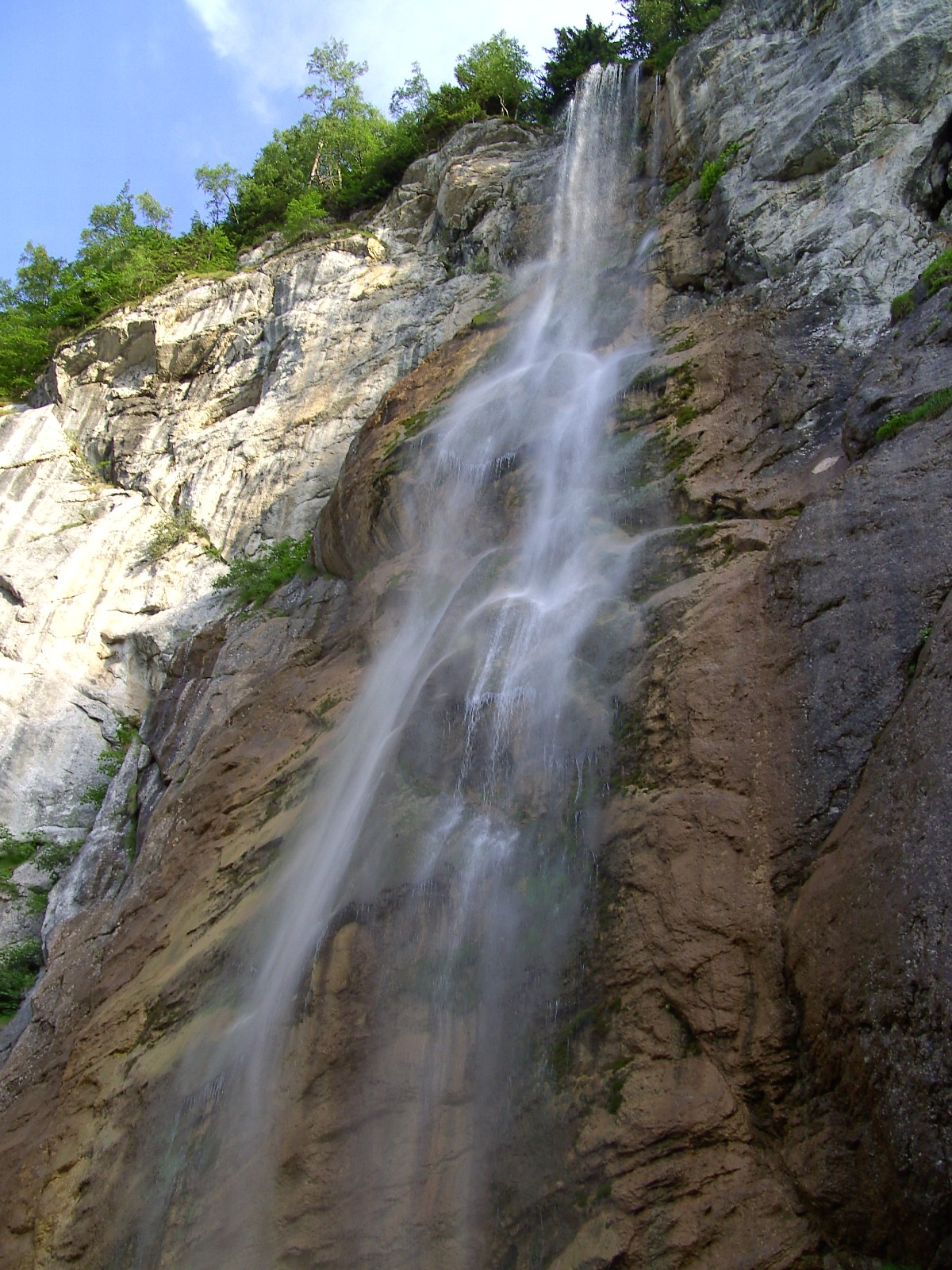
Skakavac Falls, Sarajevo, Bosnia and Herzegovina

- Skakavac Falls – Sarajevo, 98 m (322 ft)
- Štrbački buk Falls – 24 m (79 ft)

=== Bulgaria ===
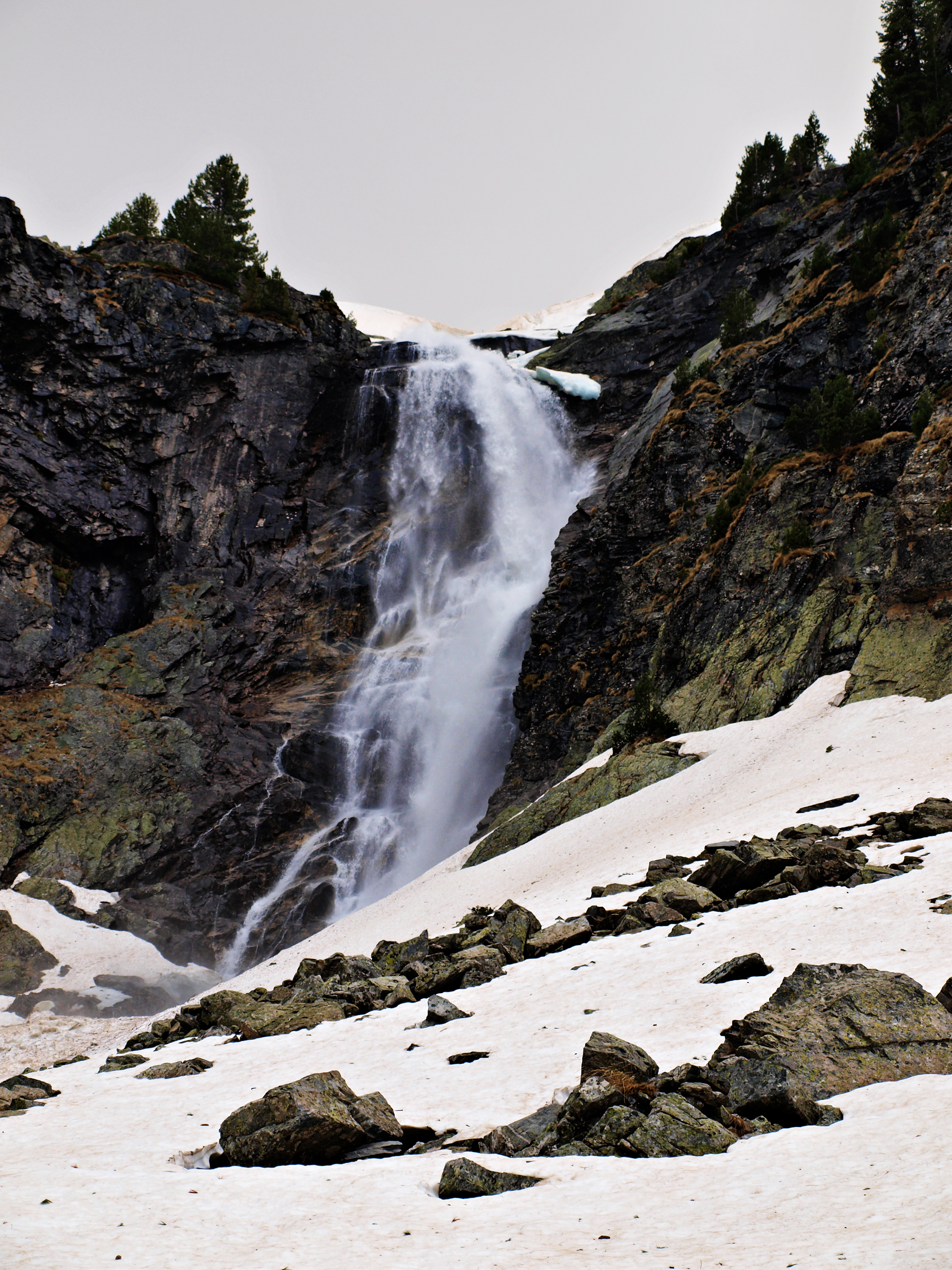
Skakavitsa Waterfall, Bulgaria

- Babsko Praskalo – 54 m (177 ft)
- Boyana Waterfall – 25 m (82 ft), Vitosha Mountain
- Emen Waterfall
- Etropole Waterfall Varovitets – 15 m (49 ft)
- Hotnitsa Waterfall — 30 m (98 ft)
- Karlovsko Praskalo – 30 m (98 ft)
- Krushuna Falls – 15 m (49 ft)
- Popinolashki waterfall – 12 m (39 ft)
- Raysko Praskalo – 124.5 m (408 ft), highest waterfall in the Balkans
- Skakavitsa Waterfall – 70 m (230 ft), Rila Mountain
- Vratsa waterfalls
  - Skaklia (not constant) – 130 m (430 ft)
  - Borov Kamak – 63 m (207 ft)

=== Croatia ===
- Veliki slap (Large Waterfall) – 78 m (256 ft), highest waterfall in Croatia
- Skradinski Buk – Krka river

=== Czech Republic ===
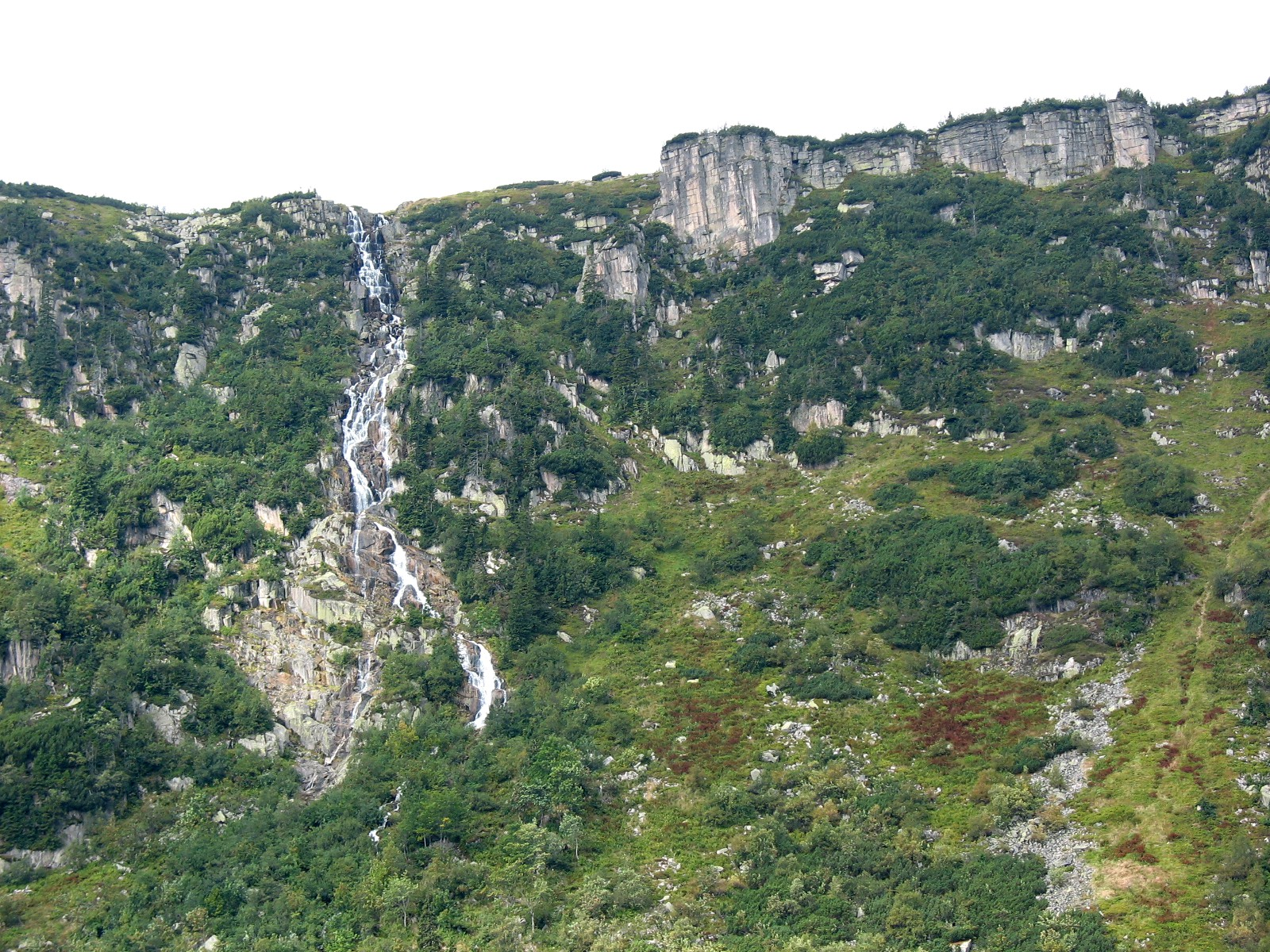
Pančava Waterfall, Giant Mountains, Czech Republic

- Labský vodopád (Elbe Waterfall) – 35 m (115 ft) followed by 200 m (656 ft) of rapids
- Mumlavský vodopád (Mumlava Waterfall) – 8.9 m (29 ft) fall with highest flow rate in the Czech Republic
- Pančavský vodopád (Pančava Waterfall) – 148 m (486 ft) highest in the Czech Republic
- Pudlavský vodopád (Pudlava Waterfall) – 122 m (400 ft)
- Rudické propadání (Rudice Sinkhole) – 86 m (282 ft) highest sinkhole waterfall in the Czech Republic

=== Denmark ===
- Døndalen – 20 m (66 ft), highest waterfall in Denmark

=== Estonia ===
- Jägala Waterfall
- Keila Falls
- Narva Falls
- Valaste Falls – 30.5 m (100 ft), highest waterfall in Estonia

=== Faroe Islands ===
- Bøsdalafossur – 30 m (98 ft)
- Fossá – 140 m (460 ft), highest waterfall in the Faroe Islands

=== Finland ===
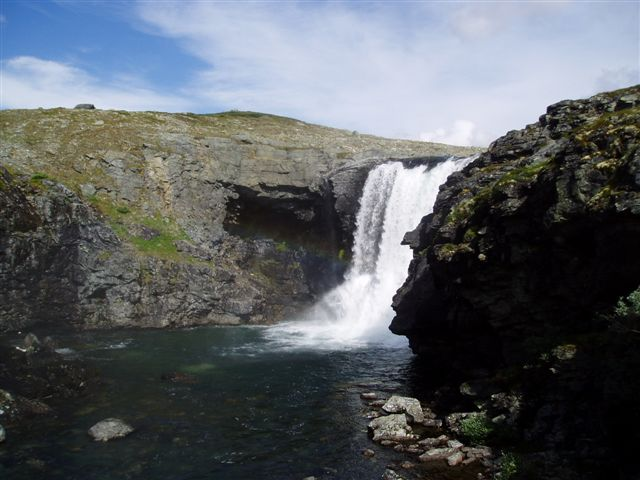
Pitsusköngäs, one of the most powerful waterfalls in Finland

- Hepoköngäs – 24 m (79 ft), highest waterfall in Finland
- Kitsiputous
- Pitsusköngäs

=== France ===
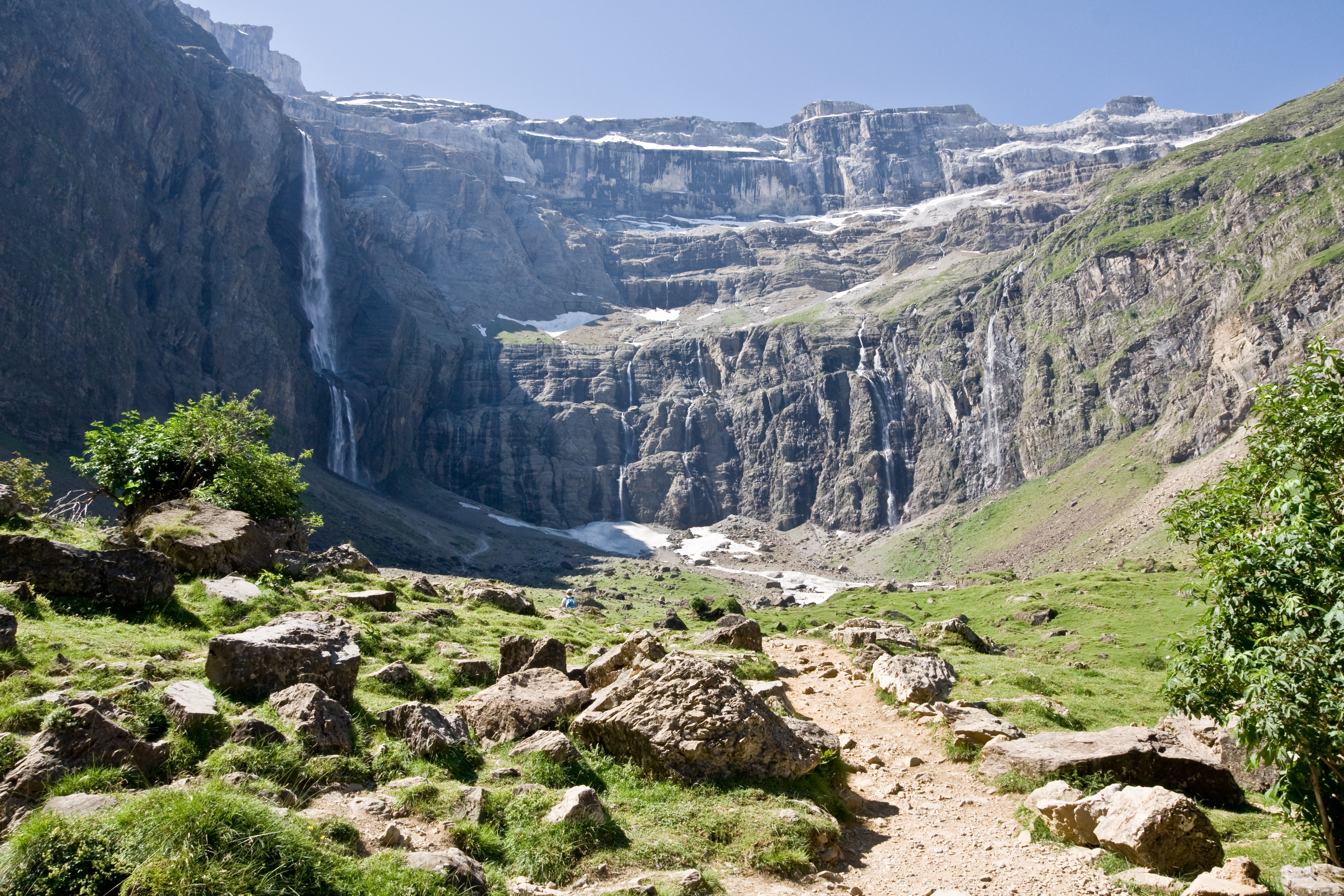
Gavarnie Falls, France

- Gavarnie Falls – 422 m (1,385 ft), highest waterfall in mainland France

=== Germany ===
- All Saints Falls – 83 m (272 ft), Oppenau, Baden-Württemberg
- Röthbach Falls – 470 m (1,540 ft), Berchtesgaden, highest waterfall in Germany
- Sankenbach Falls – 40 m (130 ft), Baiersbronn
- Triberg Falls – 163 m (535 ft), River Gutach in Triberg

=== Greece ===
- Balta of Striga – 25 m (82 ft), Epirus
- Edessa Falls – 70 m (230 ft), Macedonia
- Lepida Gorge – 45 m (148 ft), Peloponnese
- Richtis Gorge – 350 m (1,150 ft), Crete

=== Iceland ===
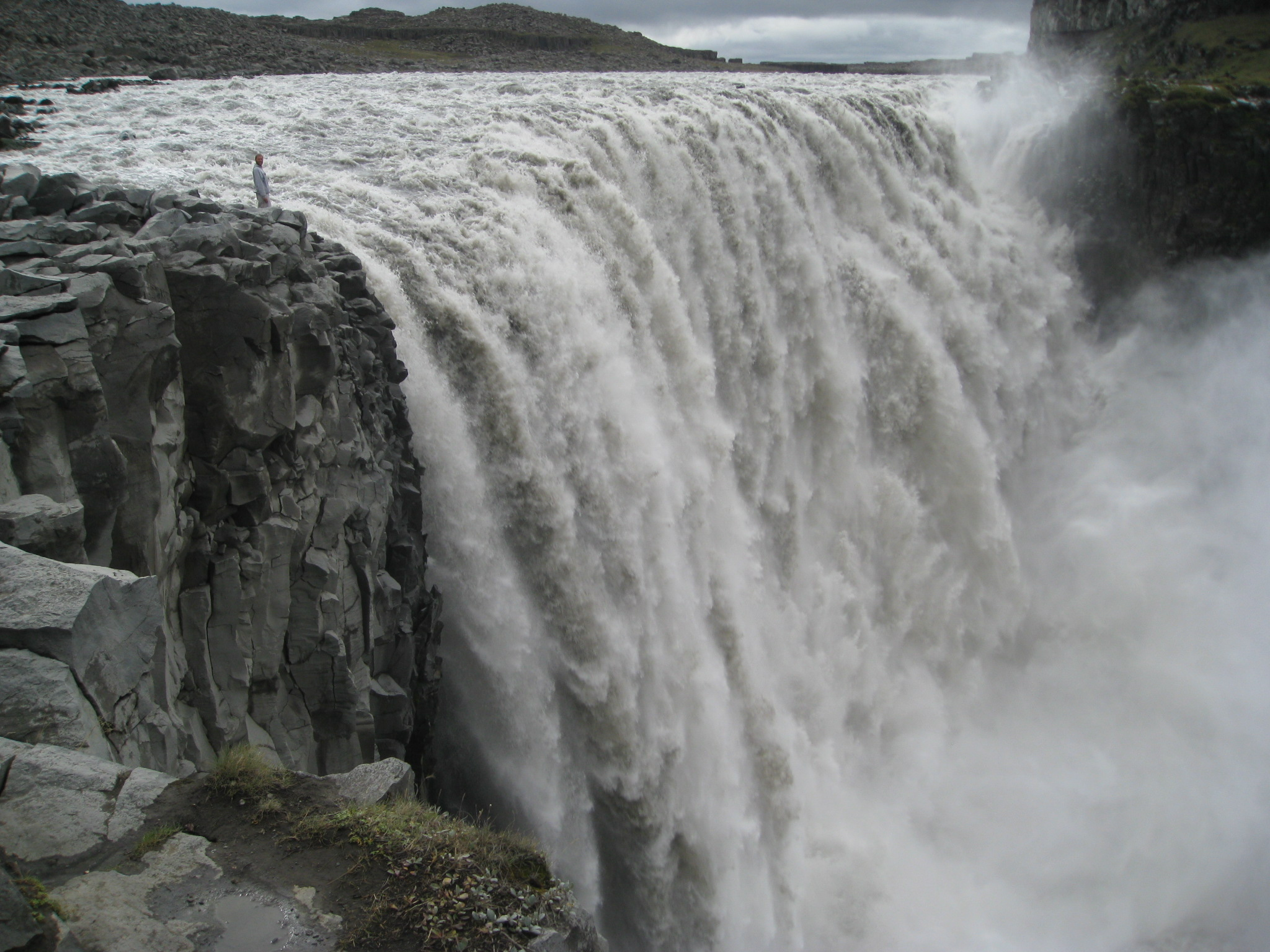
Dettifoss, Iceland – second most powerful waterfall in Europe

- Aldeyjarfoss
- Barnafoss
- Dettifoss
- Fjallfoss
- Gjáin
- Gljúfrafoss
- Glymur (196 m; previously believed tallest until 2011)
- Goðafoss
- Gullfoss
- Hafragilsfoss
- Háifoss
- Hengifoss
- Hraunfossar
- Morsárfoss (tallest at 227.3 m; discovered in 2007, measured in 2011)
- Ófærufoss
- Selfoss
- Seljalandsfoss
- Skógafoss
- Svartifoss

=== Ireland ===
- Assaroe Falls
- Powerscourt Falls – 121 m (397 ft), highest waterfall in Ireland
- Sruth in Aghaidh an Aird
- Torc Falls

=== Italy ===
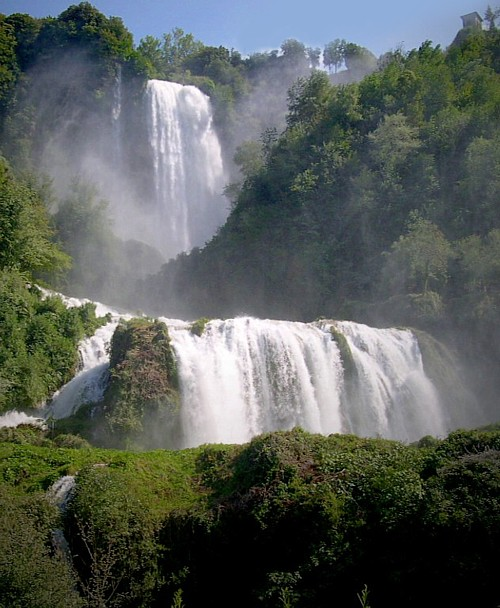
Cascata delle Marmore, Italy

- Cascata delle Marmore – 165 m (541 ft), tallest man-made waterfall in the world
- Cascate del Rio Verde
- Cascate del Serio – 315 m (1,033 ft), second tallest waterfall in Italy
- Cascata del Toce
- Cascate del Varone
- Cascate Nardis
- Cascate di Stroppia-500 m (1,600 ft), highest in Italy

=== Kosovo ===
- Mirusha Waterfalls
- White Drin Waterfall

=== Latvia ===
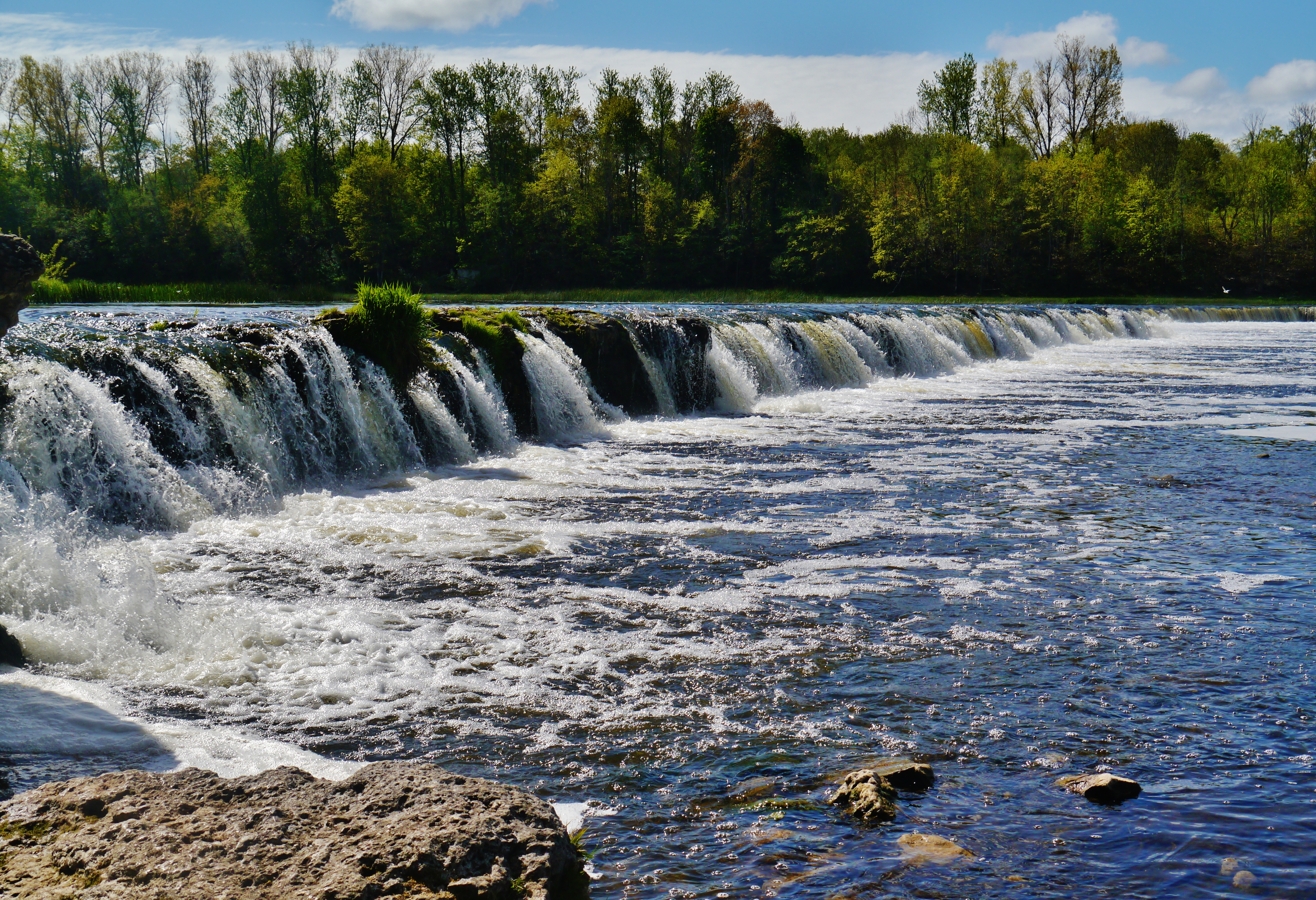
Ventas rumba – The widest waterfall in Europe

- Abavas rumba
- Ventas rumba – 1.80–2.20 m (5.9–7.2 ft) high; 249–270 m (817–886 ft) wide – The widest waterfall in Europe

=== North Macedonia ===
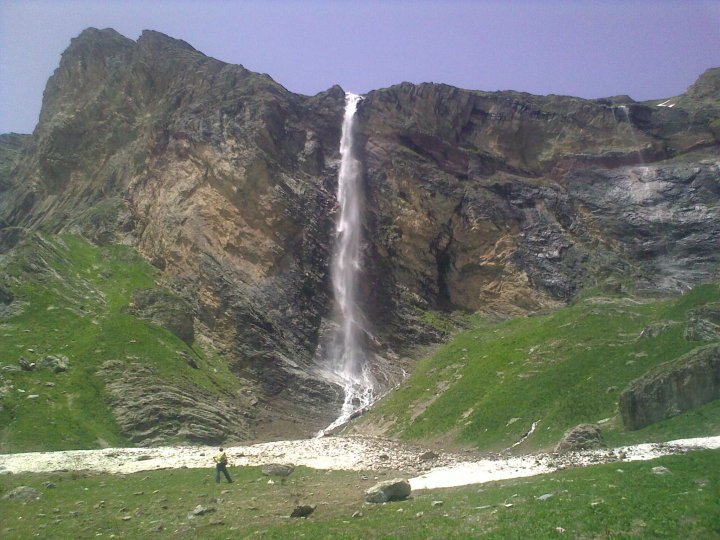
Korab Falls, North Macedonia

- Bogomila Falls
- Duf Falls
- Kolešino Falls
- Korab Falls
- Koprišnica Falls
- Smolare Falls – 39.5 m (130 ft); tallest waterfall in North Macedonia

=== Norway ===
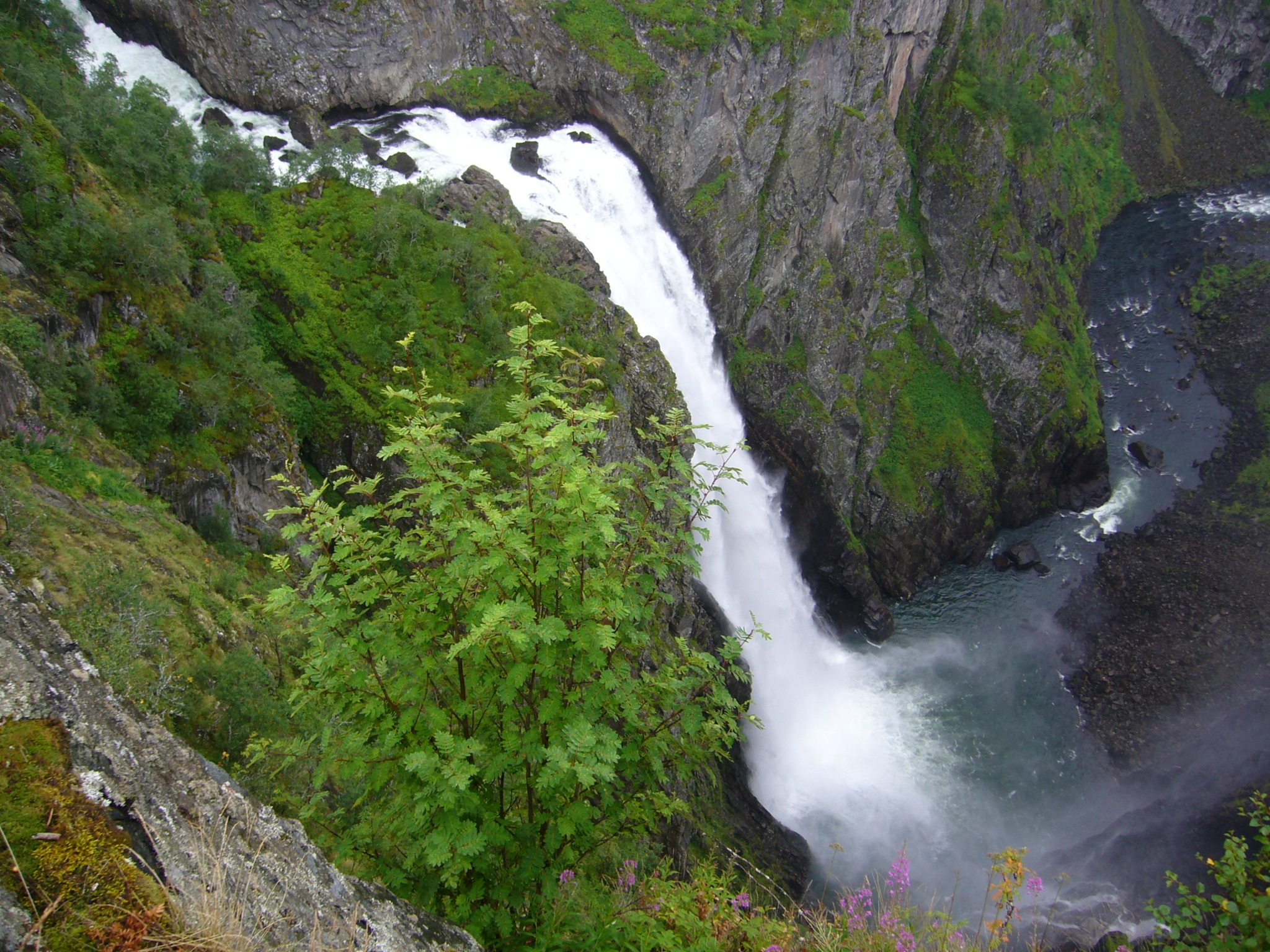
Vøringsfossen, Norway

- Espelandsfossen
- Kjelfossen – 755 m (2,477 ft)
- Kjeragfossen – 715 m (2,346 ft)
- Langfoss
- Låtefossen
- Månafossen
- Mardalsfossen
- Mongefossen – 773 m (2,536 ft)
- Ramnefjellsfossen – 818 m (2,684 ft); also known as Utigardsfossen or Utigordsfossen
- Rjukanfossen
- Sarpsfossen – one of the greatest flow rates of any waterfall in Europe
- Skrikjofossen
- Stalheimsfossen
- Steinsdalsfossen – a path goes behind the waterfall
- Tyssestrengene
- Vettisfossen
- Vinnufossen – 860 m (2,820 ft); the highest waterfall in Europe
- Vøringsfossen

=== Poland ===
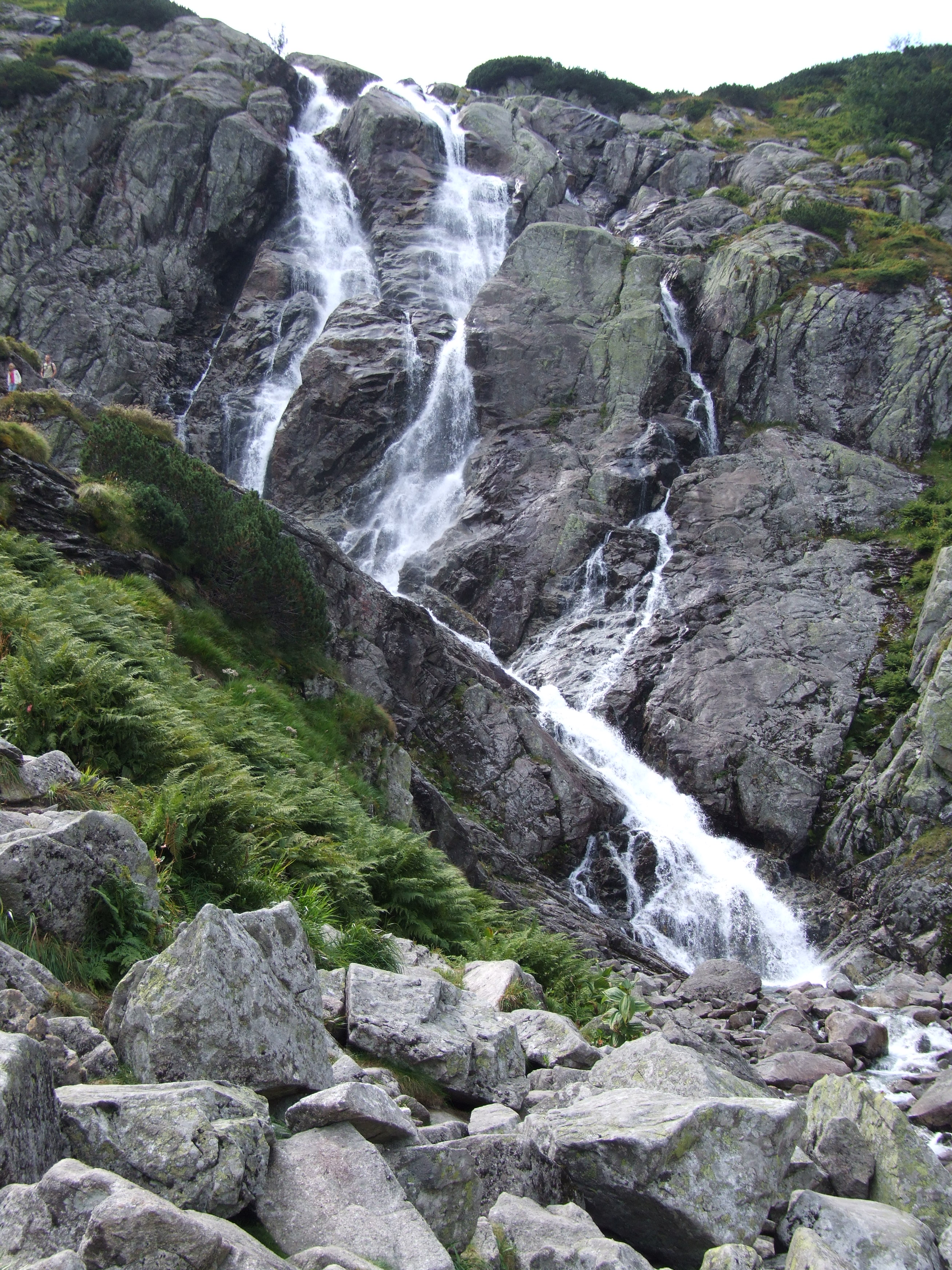
Siklawa Falls, Poland

- Black Lake Falls – Tatra Mountains – 40 m (130 ft)
- Kamieńczyk Falls – Sudetes – 27 m (89 ft)
- Mickiewicz Falls – Tatra Mountains – 10 m (33 ft)
- Podgórna Falls – Sudetes – 10 m (33 ft)
- Siklawa Falls – High Tatras – 70 m (230 ft), highest waterfall in Poland
- Siklawica Falls – Tatra Mountains – 23 m (75 ft)
- Sopotnia Wielka Falls – Beskids – 12 m (39 ft)
- Szklarki Falls – Karkonosze – 13.3 m (44 ft)
- Wilczki Falls – Eastern Sudetes – 22 m (72 ft)

=== Portugal ===
- Pego do Inferno – Tavira, Algarve
- Penedo Furado – Vila de Rei, Castelo Branco
- Pulo do Lobo – 20 m (66 ft)

==== Azores ====
- Cascata da Ribeira Grande – 300 m (980 ft) falls is the tallest waterfall at Fajãzinha
- Cascata do Poço do Bacalhau – 90 m (300 ft); Fajã Grande

==== Madeira ====
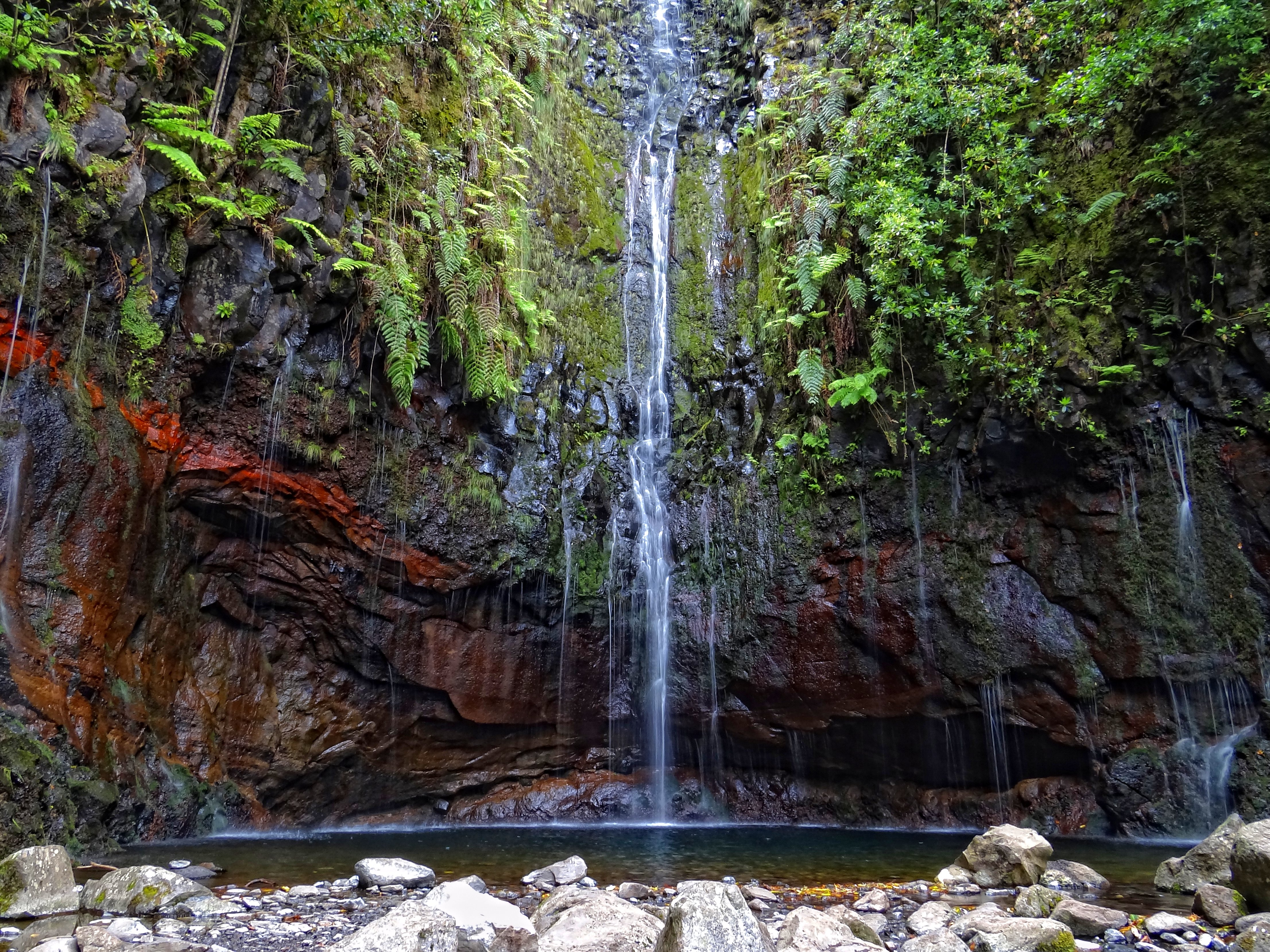
25 Fontes Falls, Madeira

- Risco Falls – 100 m (330 ft)
- 25 Fontes Falls – 30 m (98 ft); Madeira

=== Romania ===
- Bigăr Falls
- Vălul Miresei Falls

=== Russia ===
- Kivach Falls – 10.7 m (35 ft); Karelia
- Polikarya Falls – 70 m (230 ft); Sochi National Park

=== Serbia ===
- Kaluđerski Skokovi Falls – 232 m (761 ft); Stara Planina; highest waterfall in Serbia
- Kopren Falls – 103.5 m (340 ft); Stara Planina
- Pilj Falls – 65.5 m (215 ft); Stara Planina

=== Slovakia ===
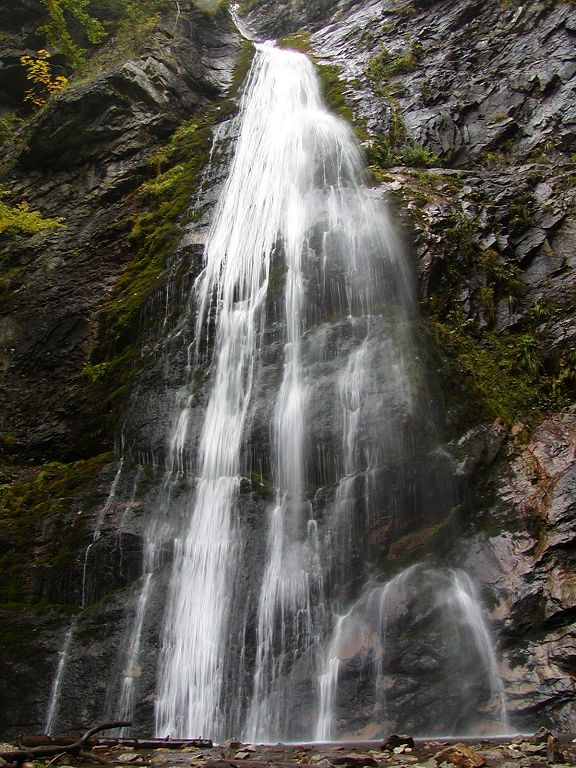
Šútovský vodopád, Slovakia

- Kmeťov vodopád – 80 m (260 ft), High Tatras
- Šútovský vodopád – 38 m (125 ft), Lesser Fatra
- Vodopád Skok – 30 m (98 ft), High Tatras
- Vajanského vodopád – 30 m (98 ft), High Tatras
- Vodopád Bystrého potoka – 20 m (66 ft), Slovak Central Mountains
- Roháčsky vodopád – 23 m (75 ft), Western Tatras
- Vodopády Studeného potoka, High Tatras
- Obrovský vodopád – 20 m (66 ft), High Tatras
- Brankovský vodopád – 55 m (180 ft), Low Tatras

=== Slovenia ===
- Boka – 139 m (456 ft), tallest in Slovenia
- Javornik Falls
- Peričnik Falls
- Rinka Falls

=== Sweden ===
- Fettjeåfallet – 60 m (200 ft)
- Hällingsåfallet – 43 m (141 ft)
- Hallamölla – 23 m (75 ft)
- Njupeskär – 125 m (410 ft)
- Stora Sjöfallet National Park – 40 m (130 ft); once one of the most powerful in Europe; however, after construction of the Suorva Dam, the flow rate decreased from an average of 160 m^{3}/s to 6 m^{3}/s
- Storforsen – 35 m (115 ft) high, largest waterfall in Sweden by flow rate, average flow rate 250 m^{3}/s, around 870 m^{3}/s in summer.
- Styggforsen – 36 m (118 ft)
- Tännforsen – 38 m (125 ft) high, 60 m (200 ft) wide, average flow rate 60 m^{3}/s.
- Västanåfallet – 90 m (300 ft)

=== Switzerland ===
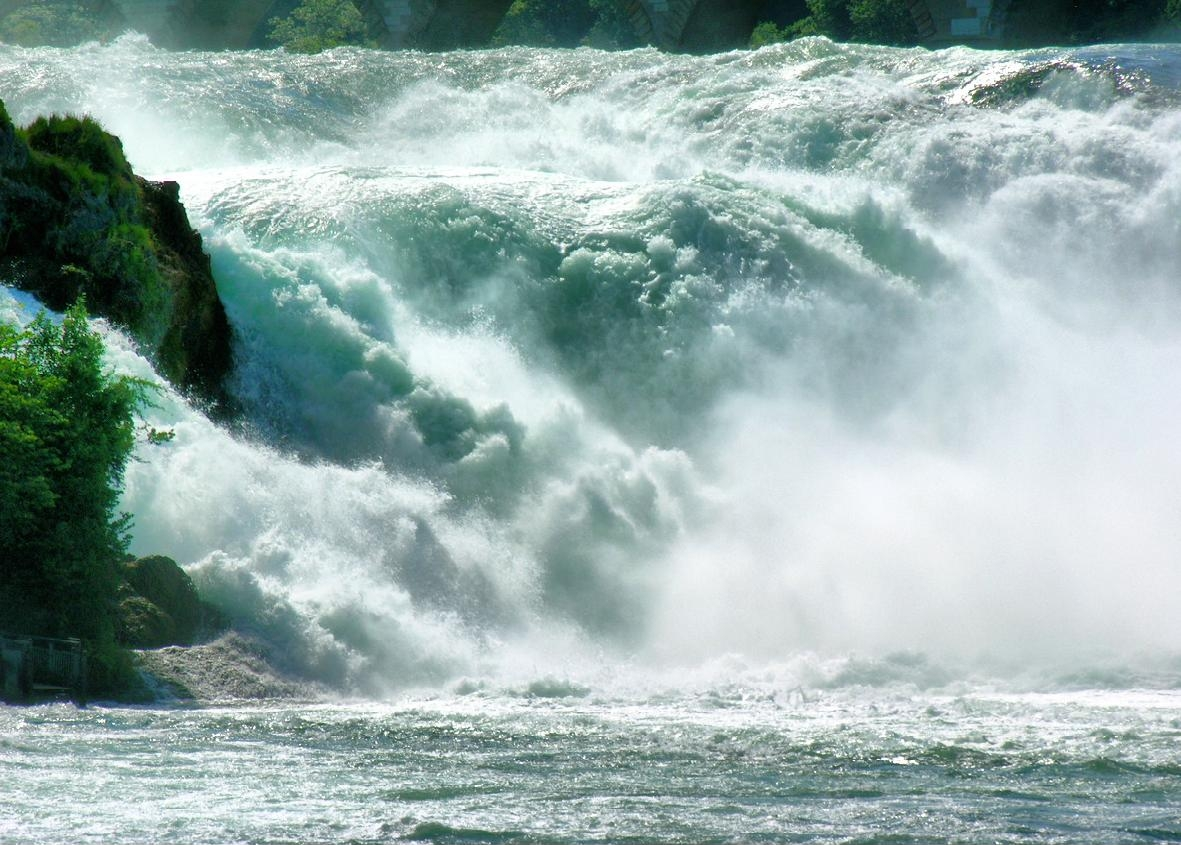
Rhine Falls, Switzerland – highest flow rate and most powerful in Europe

- Engstligen Falls – 97 and 165 m (318 and 541 ft)
- Mürrenbach Falls – 417 m (1,368 ft)
- Reichenbach Falls – 250 m (820 ft)
- Rhine Falls – 23 m (75 ft) – most powerful waterfall in Europe
- Seerenbach Falls – 50 and 305 and 190 m (164 and 1,001 and 623 ft)
- Staubbach Fall – 297 m (974 ft)
- Thur waterfalls – 23 m (75 ft)
- Trümmelbach Falls – 140 m (460 ft)

=== Ukraine ===
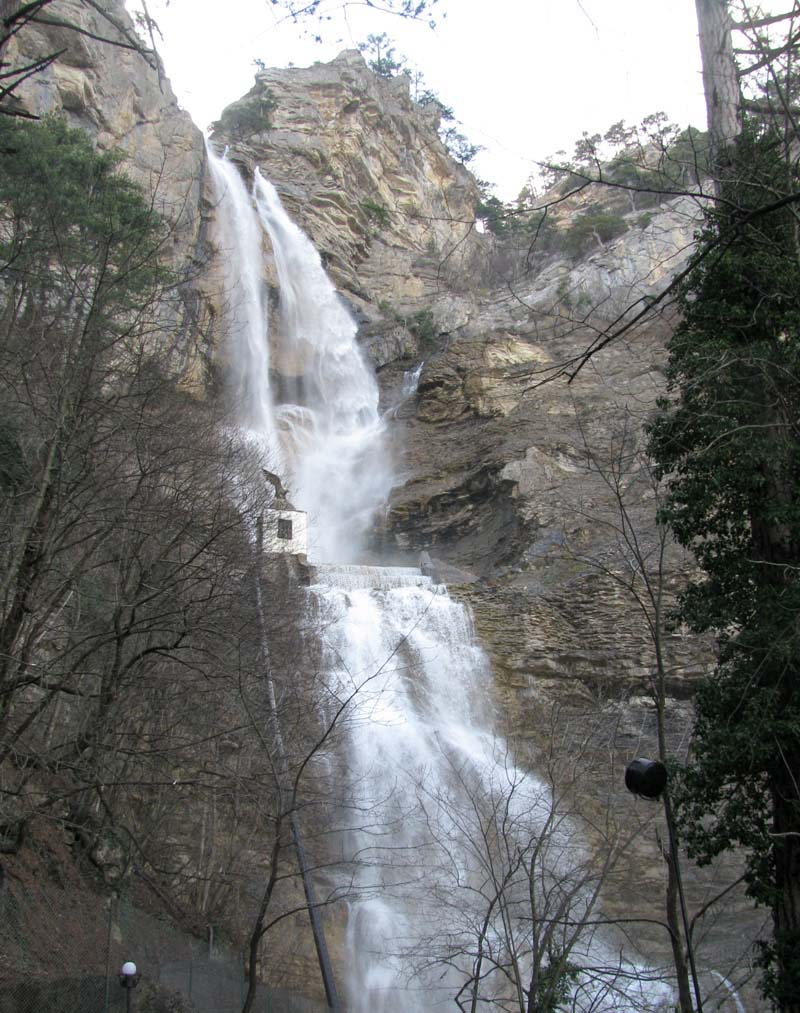
Uchan-su Falls, Ukraine

- Djur-Djur Falls – 16 m (52 ft)
- Dzhurynskyi Falls – 16 m (52 ft)
- Maniava Falls – 20 m (66 ft)
- Uchan-su Falls – 98 m (322 ft), highest waterfall in Ukraine
- Zhenetskyi Huk Falls – 15 m (49 ft)

=== United Kingdom ===
==== England ====
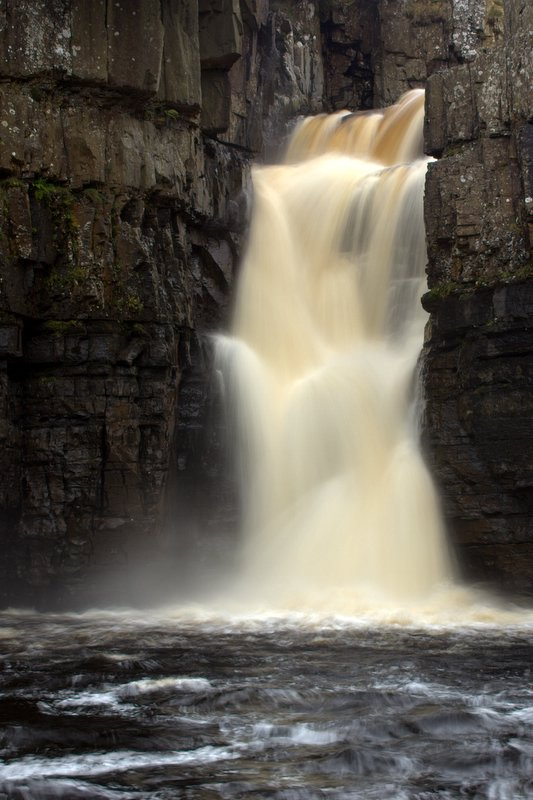
High Force, England

- Aira Force – 66 ft (20 m); Ullswater in the Lake District
- Aysgarth Falls – Wensleydale in the Yorkshire Dales
- Canonteign Falls – 220 ft (67 m); an artificial waterfall in Devon
- Cauldron Snout – 200 ft (61 m); one of England's highest; upstream from High Force
- Cautley Spout – 650 ft (200 m); highest waterfall in England; Yorkshire Dales National Park
- Falling Foss – 67 ft (20 m); near Whitby, North Yorkshire
- Gaping Gill – 361 ft (110 m); highest unbroken waterfall in England, with water falling from the surface into a cavern
- Hardraw Force – 100 ft (30 m); highest unbroken waterfall above ground, in Wensleydale in the Yorkshire Dales
- High Force – 71 ft (22 m); largest volume of water falling over an unbroken drop; one of the more popular waterfalls in England
- Mallyan Spout – Goathland in the North Yorkshire Moors
- Moss Force – Newlands Valley in the Lake District
- White Lady Falls – 100 ft (30 m); falls located in a narrow gorge

==== Scotland ====
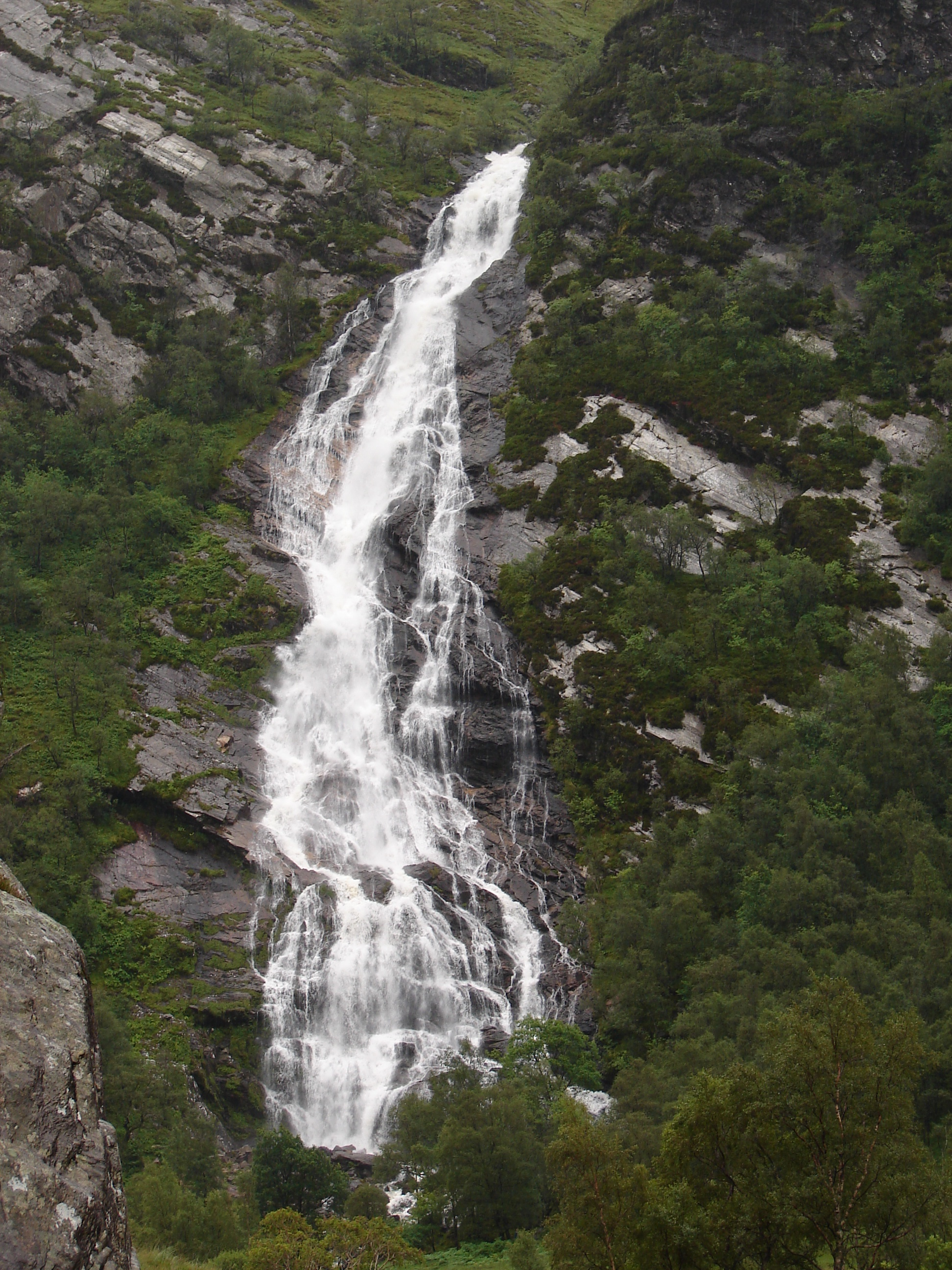
Steall Falls, Scotland

- Corra Linn, the Falls of Clyde – 84 ft (26 m)
- Eas a' Chual Aluinn – 658 ft (201 m) in a single drop; highest waterfall in the United Kingdom
- Falls of Foyers – 203 ft (62 m)
- Falls of Glomach – 370 ft (110 m)
- Steall Falls – 394 ft (120 m) in a single drop; the second highest single-drop waterfall in the United Kingdom

==== Wales ====
- Aber Falls
- Aberdulais Falls – powers Europe's largest hydro-electric water wheel
- Devil's Appendix – 305 ft (93 m), highest waterfall in Wales
- Henrhyd Falls
- Mynach Falls
- Pistyll Rhaeadr
- Pistyll y Llyn
- Swallow Falls

== North America ==
=== Belize ===
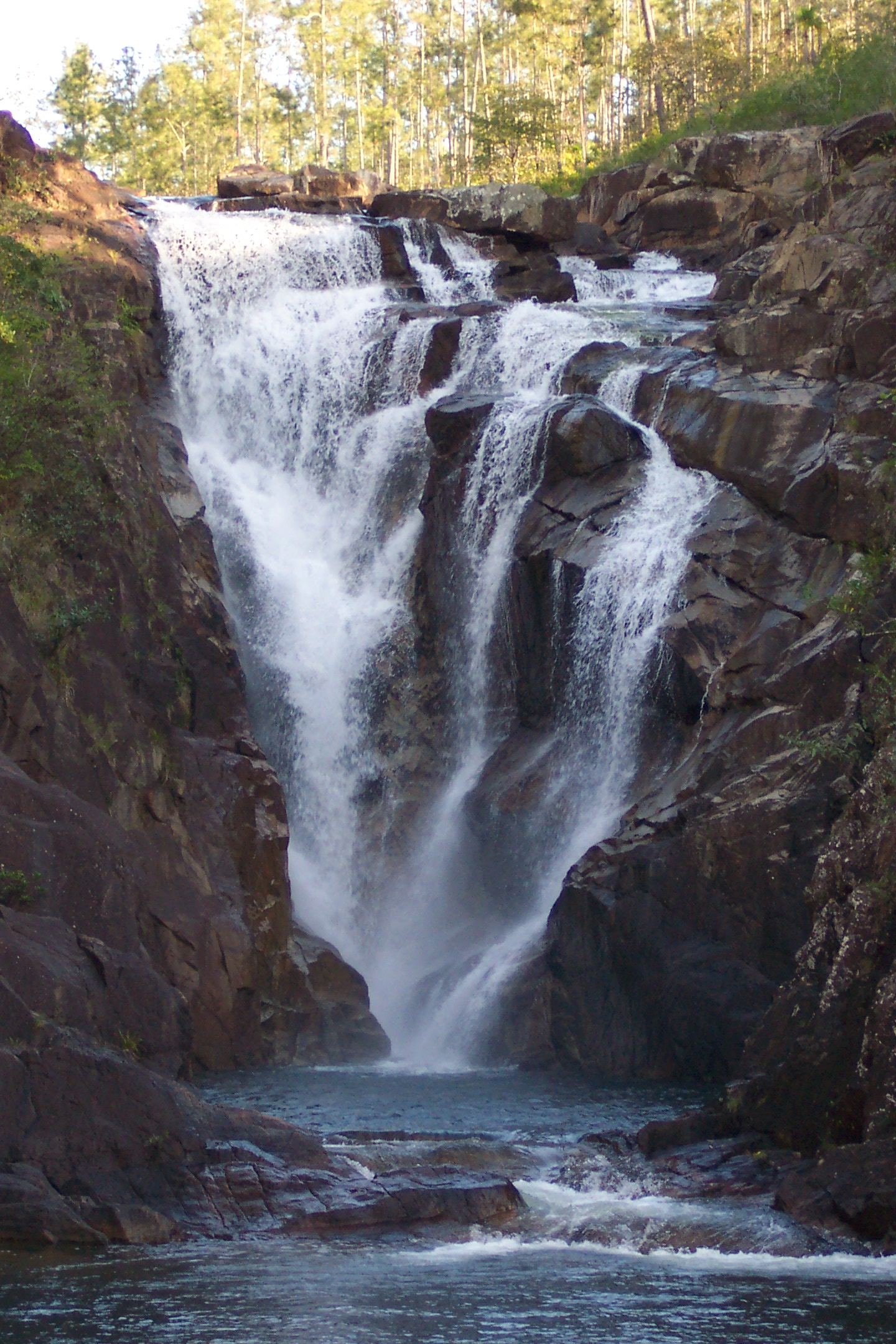
Big Rock Falls, Belize

- Big Rock Falls – 150 ft. Mountain Pine Ridge Forest Reserve, Cayo District
- Thousand Foot Falls – 1,600 ft. (488 m) Thousand Foot Falls National Park, Cayo District

=== Canada ===
==== Alberta ====
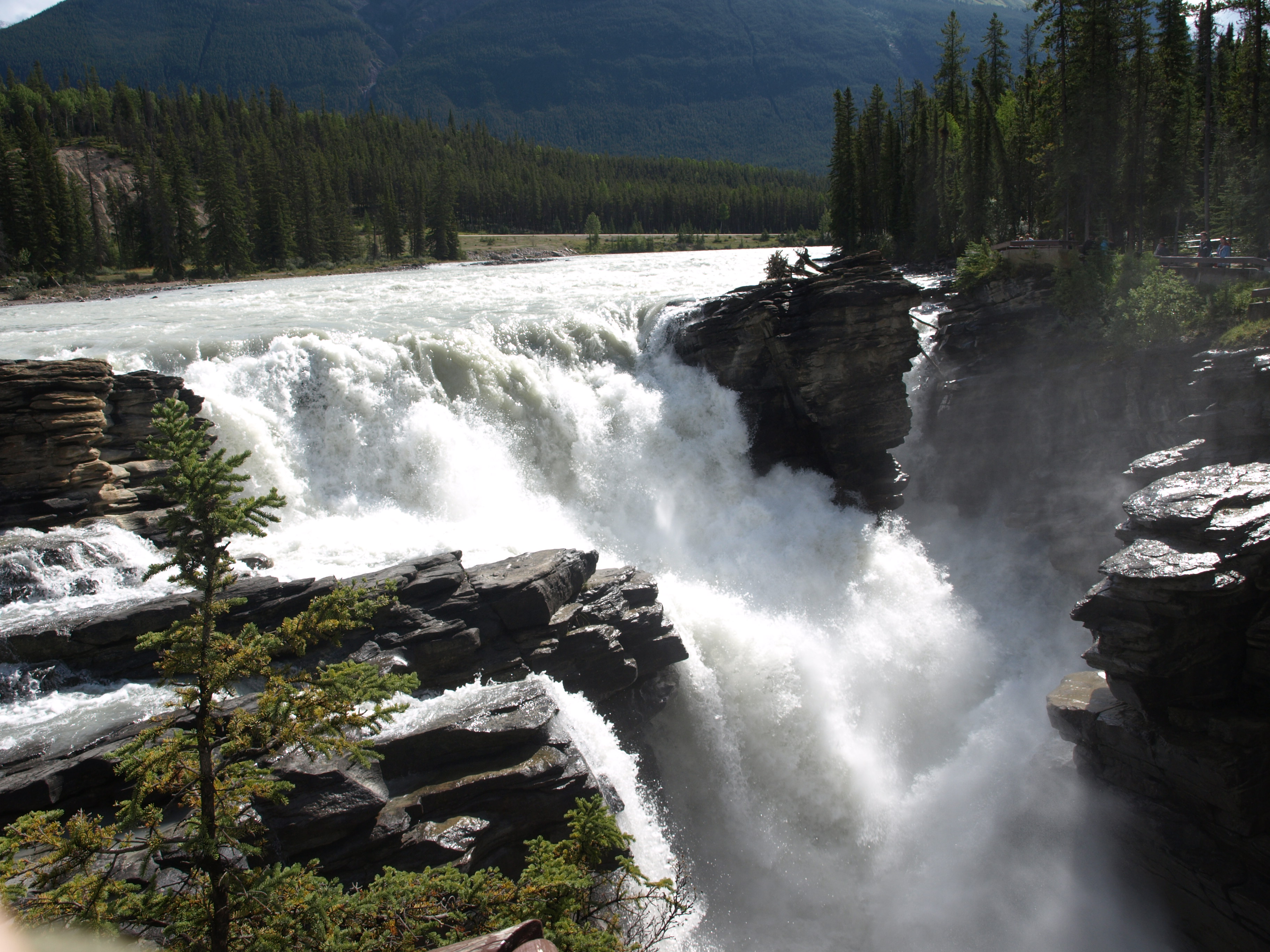
Athabasca Falls, Alberta

- Athabasca Falls – Jasper National Park
- Bow Falls – Banff National Park
- Bow Glacier Falls – Banff National Park
- Crescent Falls – on the David Thompson Highway
- Maligne Canyon Falls – Jasper National Park
- Panther Falls – Banff National Park
- Sunwapta Falls – Jasper National Park

==== British Columbia ====
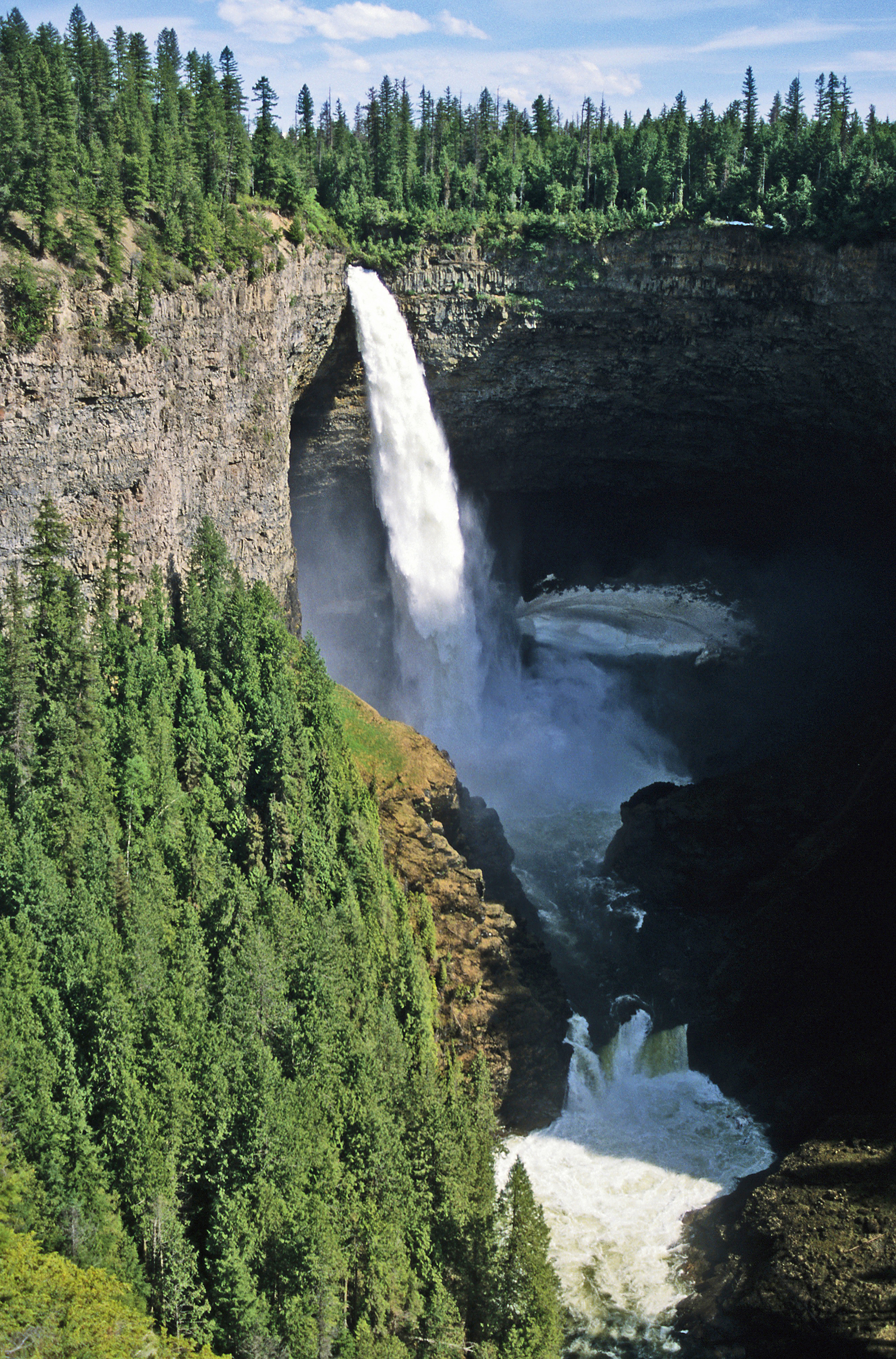
Helmcken Falls, British Columbia

- Alexander Falls – Callaghan Valley, near Whistler
- Brandywine Falls – near Whistler
- Bridal Veil Falls – also called Bridal Falls; near Rosedale
- Canim Falls – Wells Gray Provincial Park
- Chatterbox Falls – Princess Louisa Marine Provincial Park
- Dawson Falls – Wells Gray Provincial Park
- Della Falls – Strathcona Provincial Park
- Emperor Falls – Mount Robson Provincial Park
- Helmcken Falls – Wells Gray Provincial Park
- Hunlen Falls – Tweedsmuir South Provincial Park
- James Bruce Falls – Princess Louisa Marine Provincial Park
- Keyhole Falls – near Pemberton
- Kinuseo Falls – near Tumbler Ridge
- Mahood Falls – Wells Gray Provincial Park
- Moul Falls – Wells Gray Provincial Park
- Nairn Falls – near Pemberton
- Shannon Falls – near Squamish
- Spahats Creek Falls – Wells Gray Provincial Park
- Takakkaw Falls – Yoho National Park
- Wapta Falls – Yoho National Park
- Grizzly Falls – Nahatlatch Provincial Park

==== Newfoundland and Labrador ====
- Churchill Falls – on Churchill River, Labrador
- Pissing Mare Falls – Gros Morne National Park

==== Northwest Territories ====
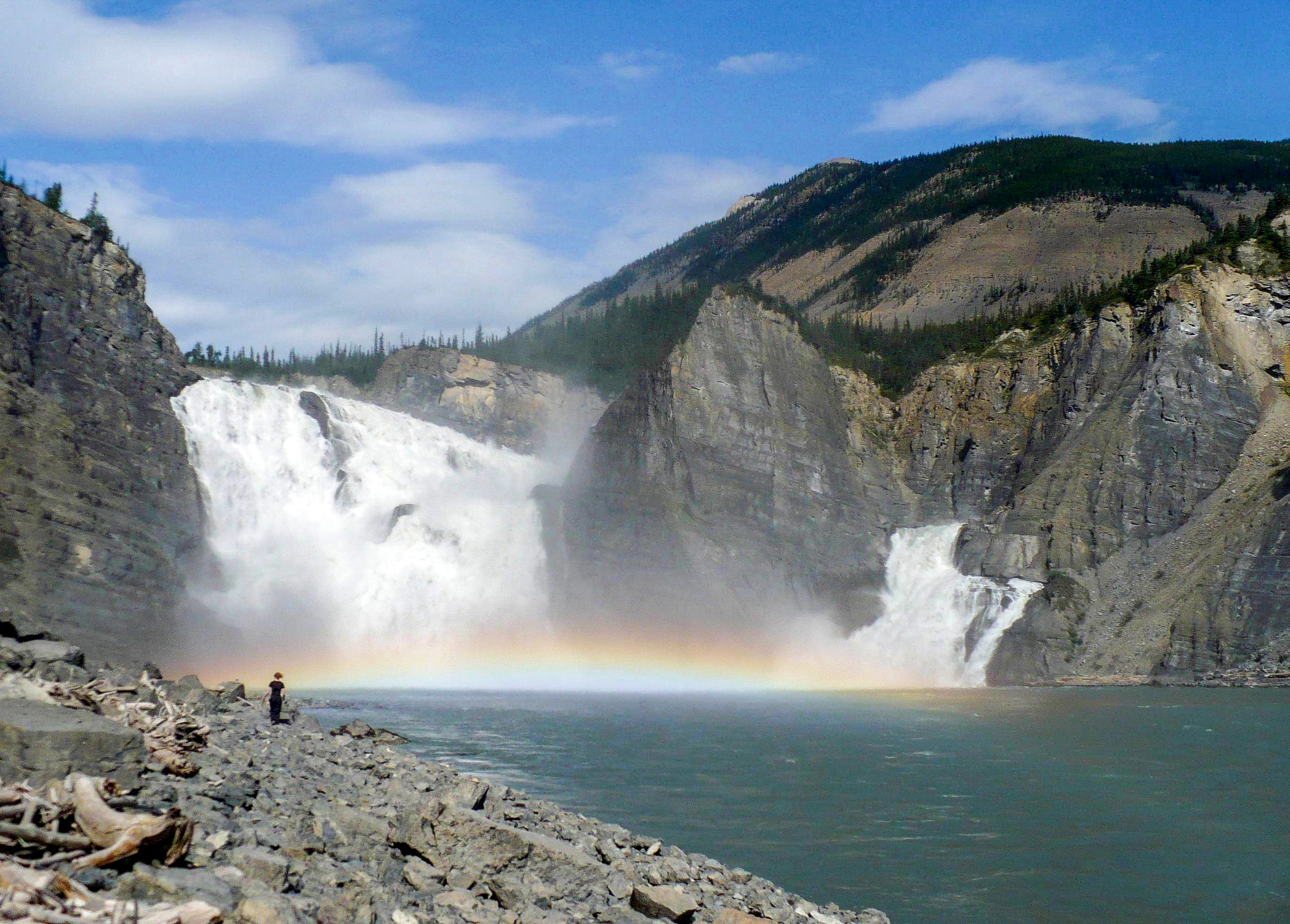
Virginia Falls, Northwest Territories

- Alexandra Falls – on Hay River
- Virginia Falls – on South Nahanni River in Nahanni National Park

==== Nunavut ====
- Kattimannap Qurlua – Hood River

==== Ontario ====
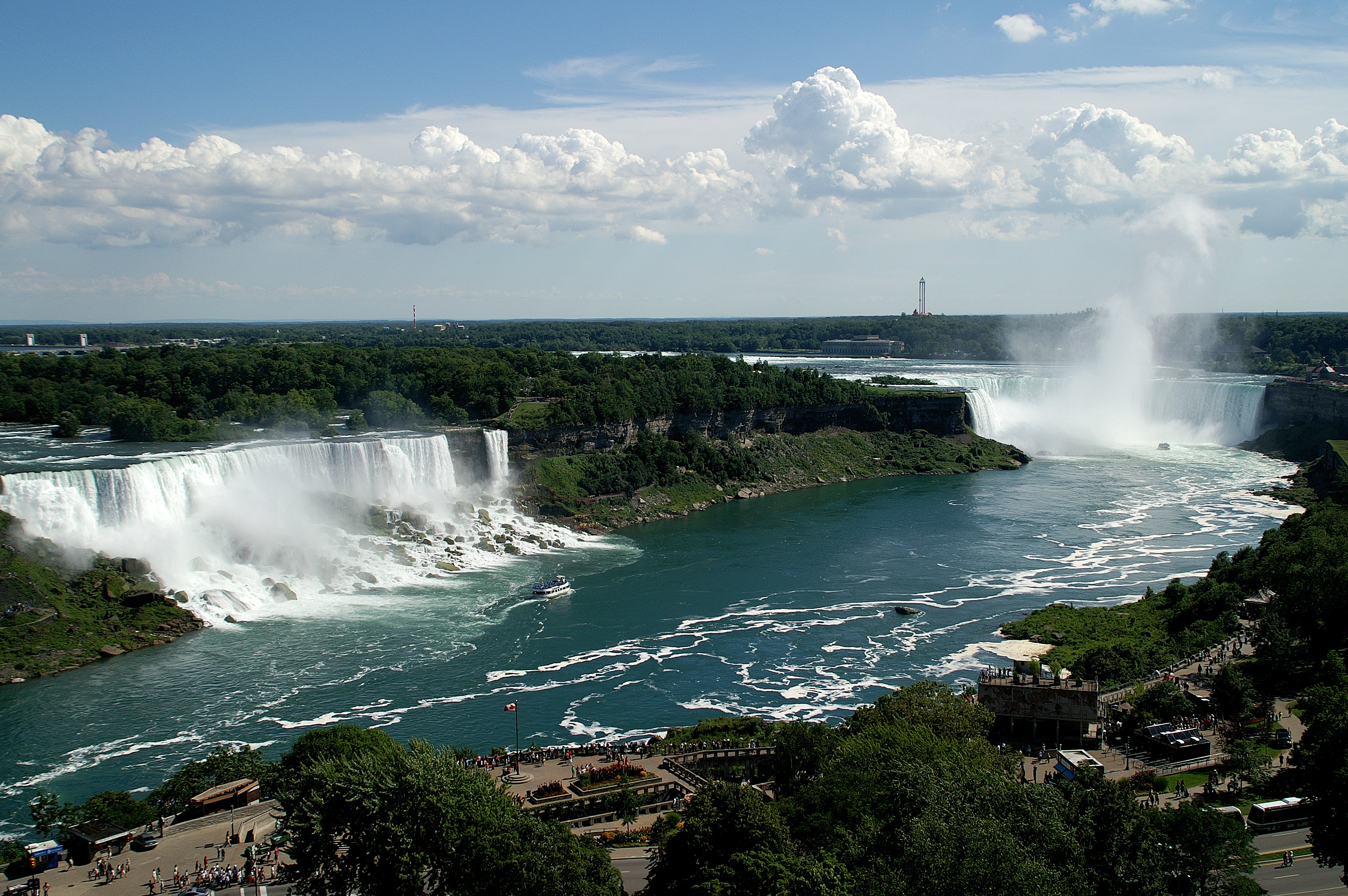
Niagara Falls, Canada (Horseshoe Falls on right) / United States (American Falls on left) – highest flow rate in North America

- Albion Falls – near Hamilton
- Helen Falls – Lady Evelyn River
- Horseshoe Falls – part of Niagara Falls, highest flow rate in North America including the American Falls
- Inglis Falls – Owen Sound
- Kakabeka Falls – near Thunder Bay
- Tew's Falls – Hamilton

==== Quebec ====
- Chaudière Falls – Ottawa-Gatineau
- Montmorency Falls – near Quebec City
- Sainte-Anne Falls – Canyon Sainte-Anne, near Quebec City

=== Costa Rica ===
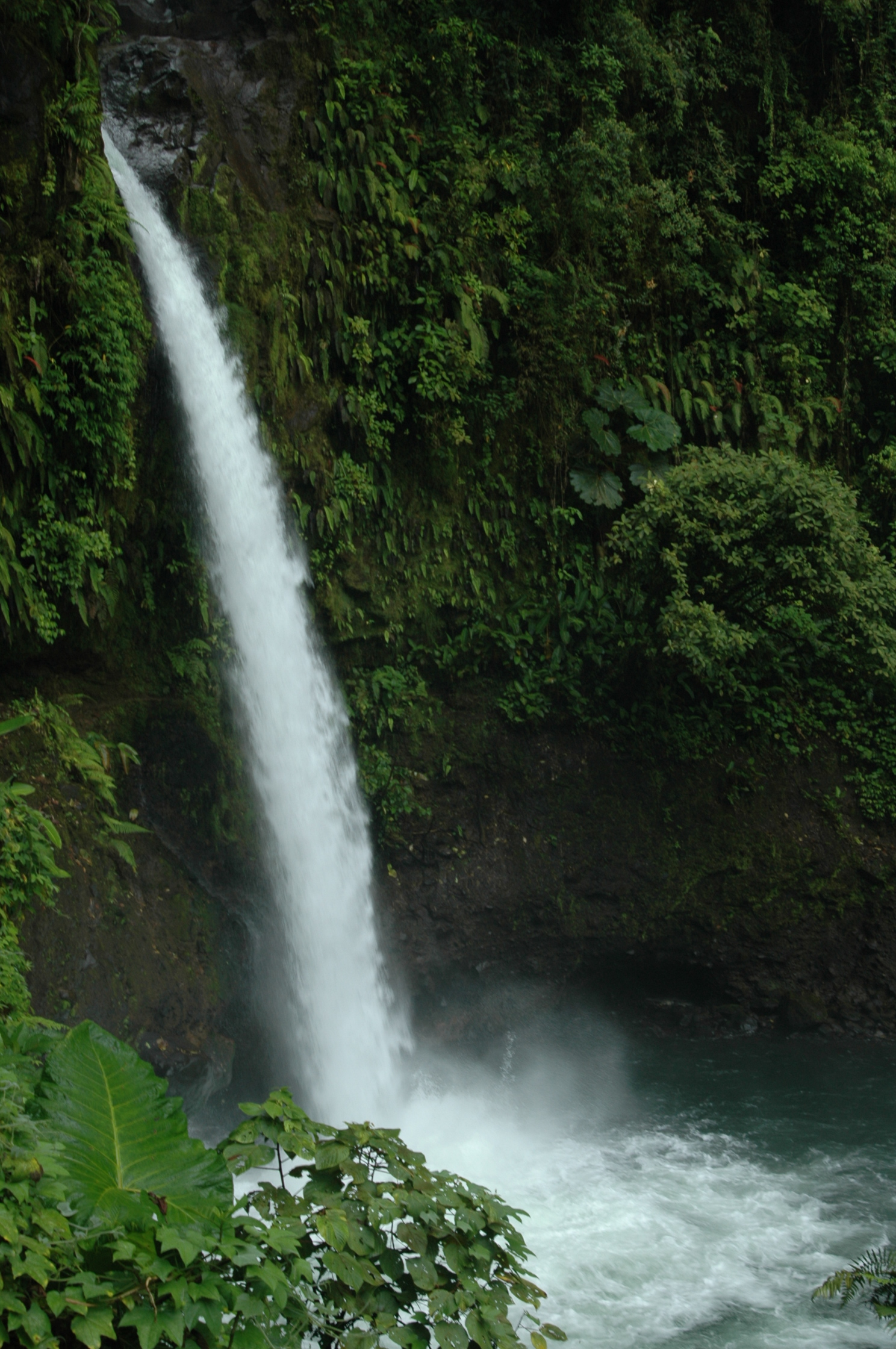
La Paz Falls, Costa Rica

- La Fortuna Falls
- La Paz Falls
- Volio Falls

=== Greenland ===
- Qorlortorsuaq Falls

=== Guadeloupe ===
- Carbet Falls

=== Haiti ===
- Saut-Mathurine Falls

=== Jamaica ===
- Dunn's River Falls – St. Ann
- Mayfield Falls – Westmoreland

=== Mexico ===
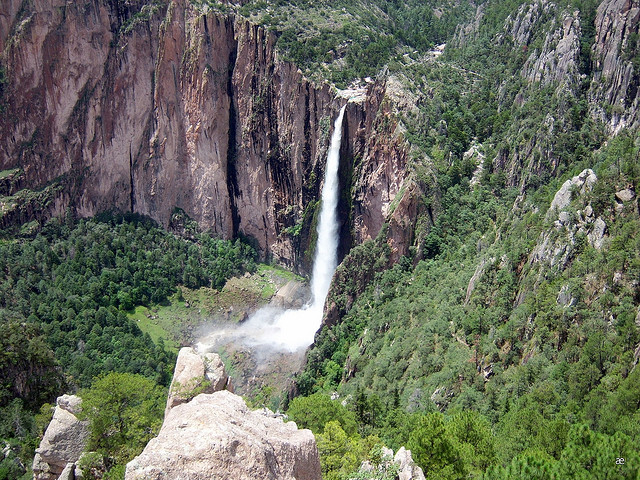
Basaseachic Falls, Mexico

- Agua Azul
- Basaseachic Falls
- Cascada de Texolo
- Cola de Caballo
- Piedra Volada

=== Saint Lucia ===
- Sault Falls

=== United States ===
Category:Waterfalls of the United States by state

==== Alabama ====
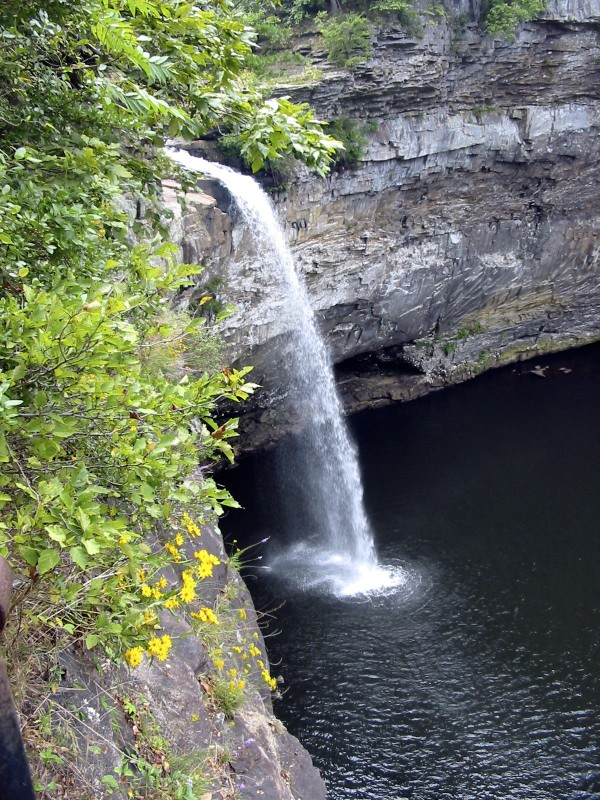
DeSoto Falls, Alabama

- DeSoto Falls – 31.7 m (104 ft)
- Grace's High Falls – 40.5 m (133 ft), highest in Alabama, Little River Canyon National Preserve
- Little River Falls – 14 m (46 ft)
- Noccalula Falls – 27 m (89 ft), Gadsden

==== Alaska ====
- Brooks Falls – Katmai National Park and Preserve
- Nugget Falls – also known as Nugget Creek Falls or Mendenhall Glacier Falls, near Juneau

==== Arizona ====
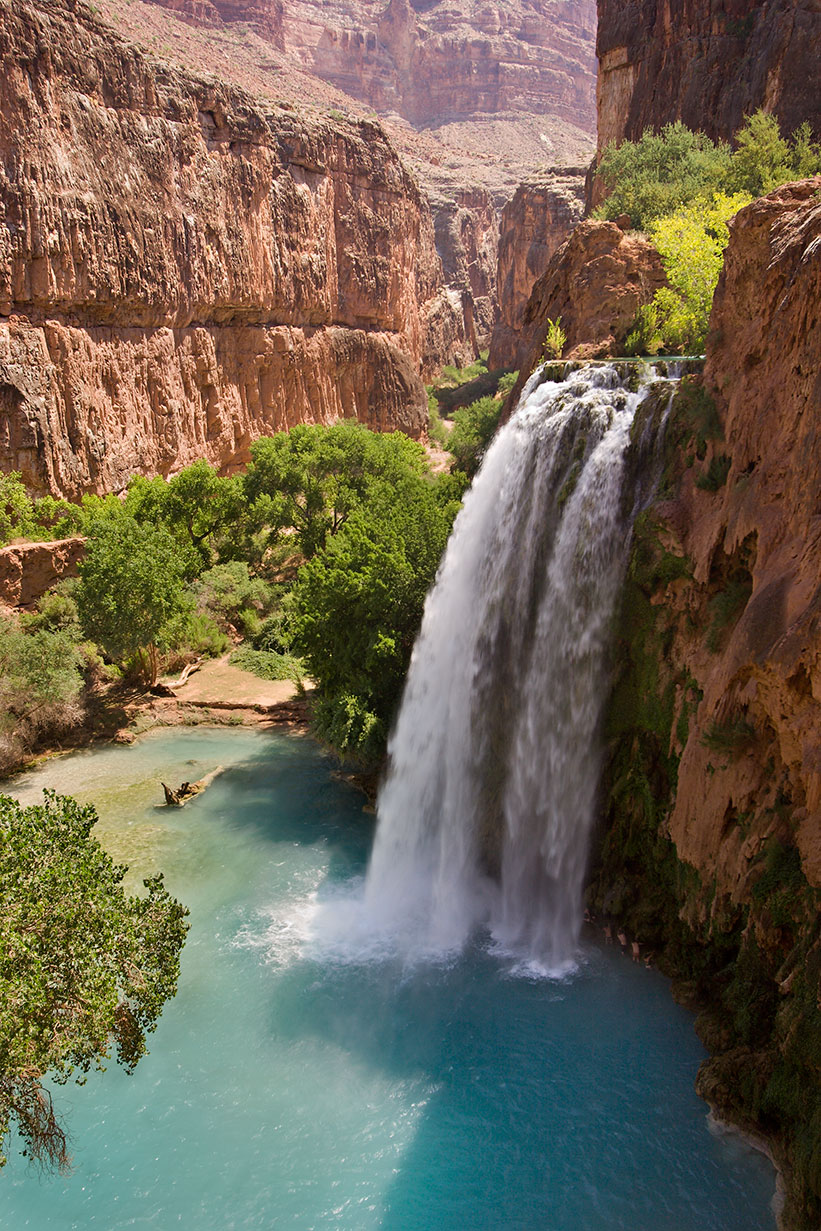
Havasu Falls, Arizona

- Grand Falls – 56 m (184 ft), Little Colorado River
- Havasu Falls – 37 m (121 ft)
- Mooney Falls – 60 m (200 ft)

==== Arkansas ====
- Hemmed-In-Hollow Falls – 64 m (210 ft) sheer

==== California ====
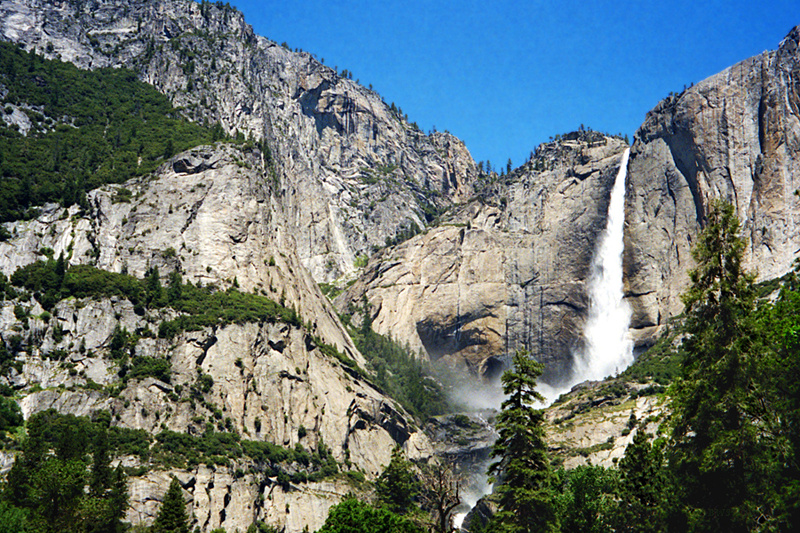
Yosemite Falls, California

- Bonita Falls – 152 m (499 ft) while flowing
- Bridalveil Fall – 189 m (620 ft) sheer when flowing
- Burney Falls – 39 m (128 ft), spring-fed, 4 m^{3}/s (140 ft^{3}/s) constant flow rate
- Chilnualna Falls – 210 m (690 ft)
- Darwin Falls – 24 m (79 ft), split over two sections and the tallest waterfall in Death Valley National Park
- Feather Falls – 125 m (410 ft)
- Illilouette Fall – 110 m (360 ft)
- McWay Falls – 24 m (79 ft), flowing year-round
- Nevada Fall – Yosemite National Park; 181 m (594 ft), followed by 97 m plunge at Vernal Fall, year-round
- Ribbon Fall – 491 m (1,611 ft) when flowing
- Silver Strand Falls – 175 m (574 ft) when flowing
- Three Chute Falls – 24 m (79 ft) on Tenaya Creek, flows highly variable but perennial
- Vernal Fall – 97 m (318 ft); on Merced River just downstream of Nevada Fall
- Yosemite Falls – one of the highest waterfalls in North America with a total height of 739 m (2,425 ft) over three sections; the tallest single drop is 436 m (1,430 ft)

==== Colorado ====
- Bridal Veil Falls – Telluride; 111 m (364 ft)
- Fish Creek Falls – 85 m (279 ft)
- Seven Falls – 55 m (180 ft)

==== Connecticut ====
- Dean's Ravine Falls
- Great Falls – Housatonic River
- Kent Falls
- Roaring Brook Falls

==== Florida ====
- Falling Water Falls - 22 m (72 ft) waterfall, the highest in the state

==== Georgia ====
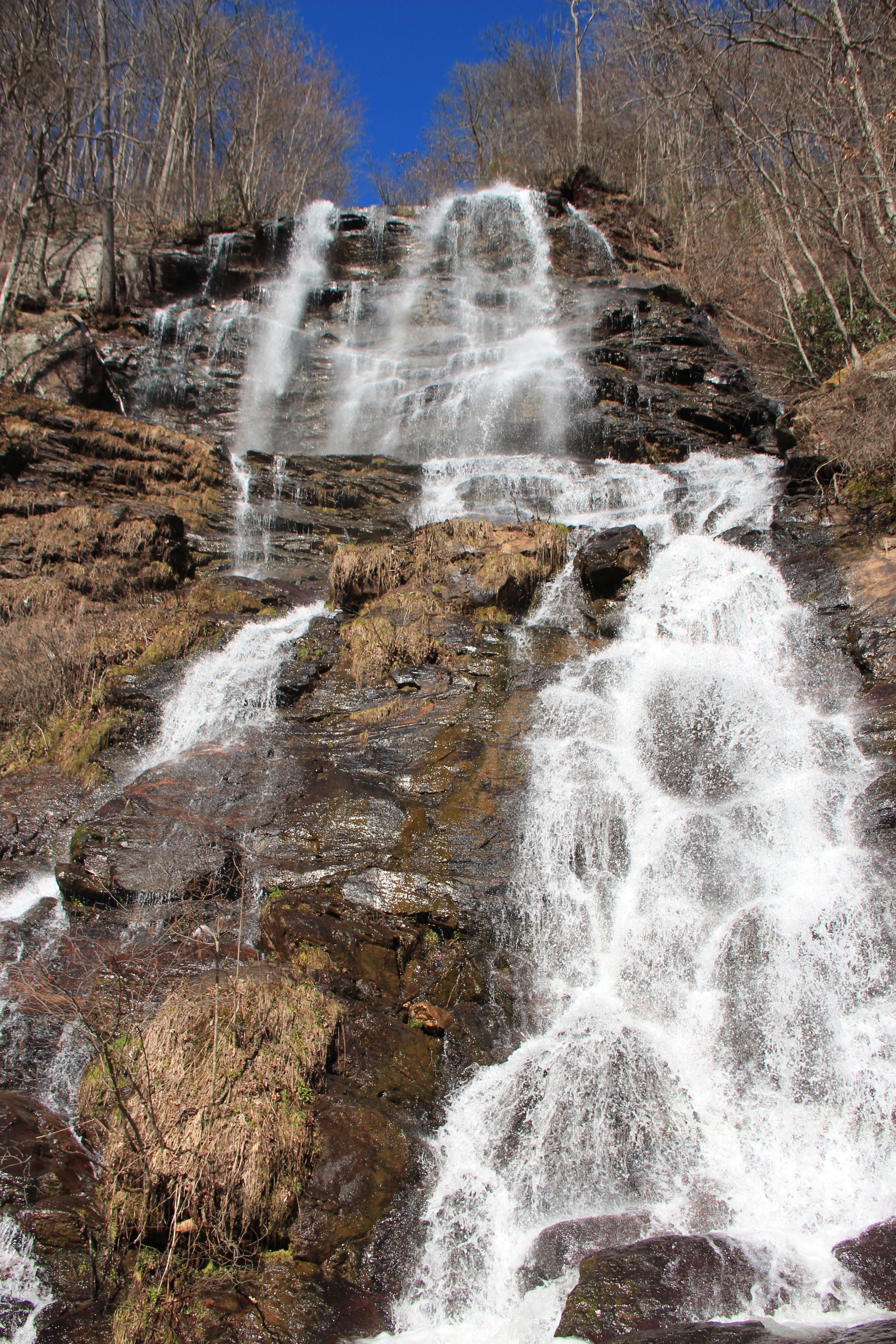
Amicalola Falls, highest in Georgia

- Amicalola Falls – 222 m (728 ft), highest waterfall in Georgia
- Anna Ruby Falls – 47 m (154 ft) on the Curtis Creek side
- Cascade Falls – 183 m (600 ft) cascade with 3 drops, the tallest of which is 80 m (260 ft)
- Cochrans Falls – 183 m (600 ft) cascade
- DeSoto Falls – the upper falls drop about 61 m (200 ft), the middle falls about 27 m (89 ft) and the lower falls cascade about 11 m (36 ft)
- Dick's Creek Falls – 18 m (59 ft) sheer drop over a granite mound into the Chattooga River
- Dukes Creek Falls – 46 m (151 ft)
- Estatoah Falls – several hundred feet, exact height not known
- Holcomb Creek Falls – 37 m (121 ft)
- Minnehaha Falls – 30.5 m (100 ft)
- Toccoa Falls – 56 m (184 ft) sheer drop

==== Hawaii ====
(listed after Australia in the Oceania section below)

==== Idaho ====
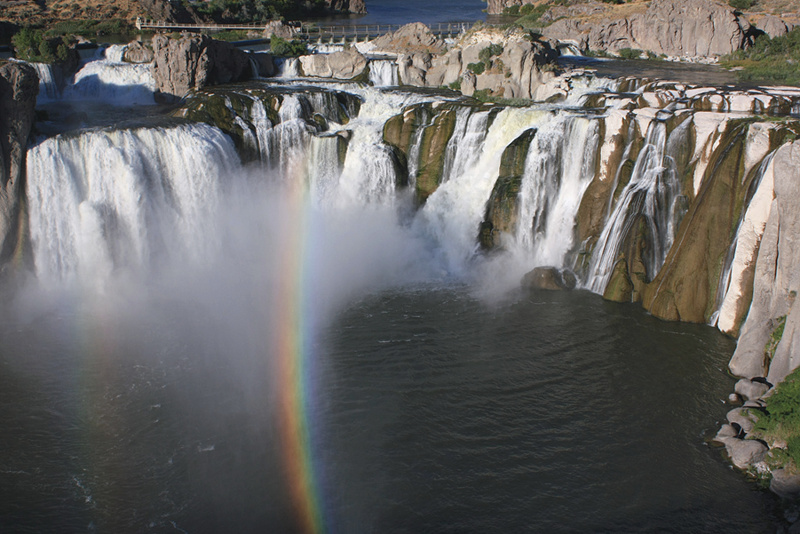
Shoshone Falls, Idaho

- Lower Mesa Falls
- Moyie Falls
- Shoshone Falls – 65 m (213 ft)
- Twin Falls
- Upper Mesa Falls

==== Indiana ====
- Cataract Falls
- Williamsport Falls
- Clifty Falls

==== Kentucky ====
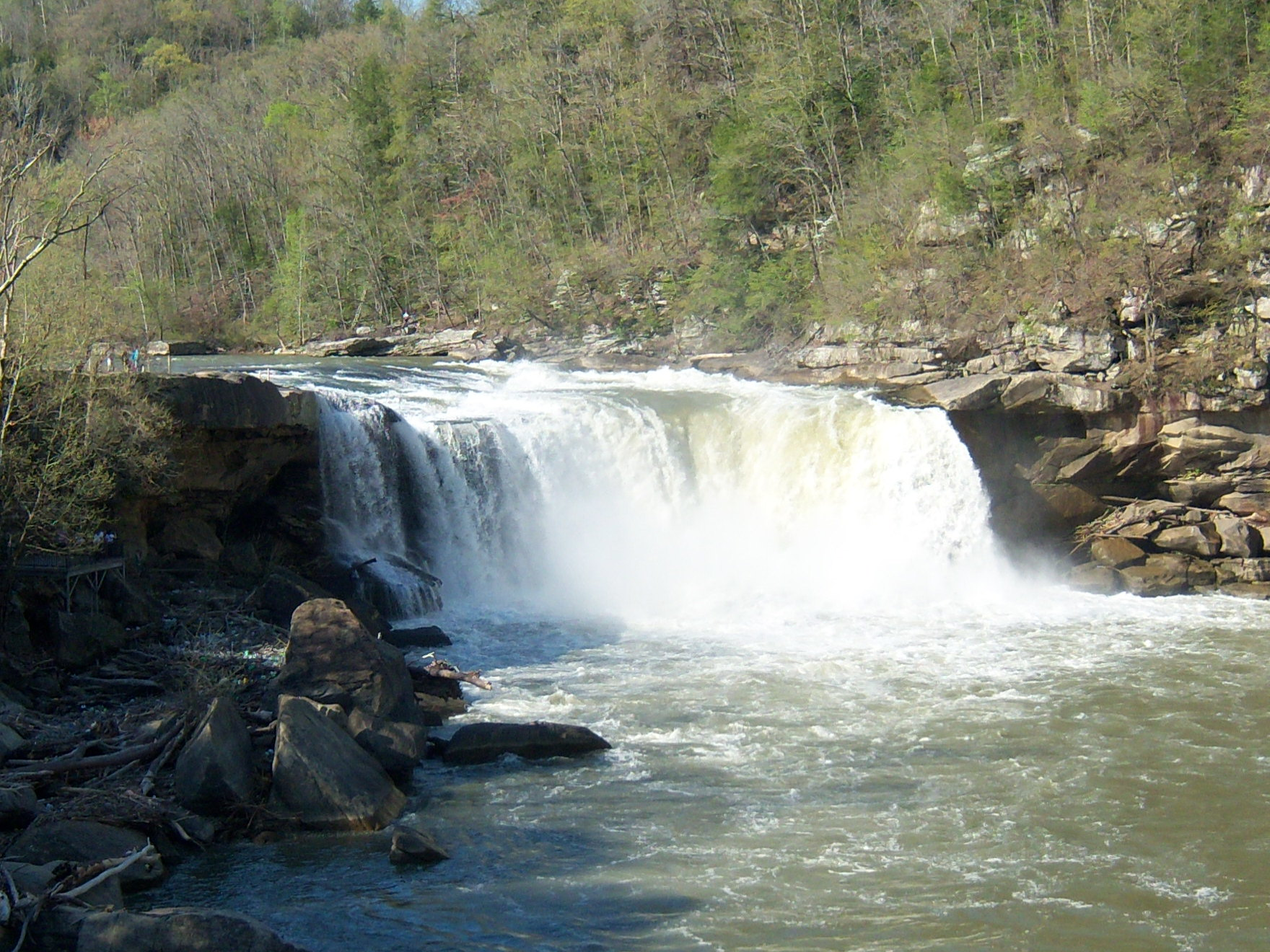
Cumberland Falls, Kentucky

- Cumberland Falls – 21 m (69 ft) drop, home to moonbows when the moon is full, flowing year-round
- Seventy Six Falls – 23 m (75 ft) drop in Clinton County
- Yahoo Falls – 34 m (112 ft), tallest plunge waterfall in Kentucky

==== Louisiana ====
- Lake Peigneur Drilling Disaster – 50 m (160 ft) drop (all below sea-level) flowed for 3 days in 1980 due to an oil rig drilling into a salt mine

==== Maine ====
- Angel Falls
- First Falls
- Fourth Falls
- Katahdin Falls – 244 m (800 ft), tallest waterfall in Maine
- Moxie Falls
- Second Falls
- Smalls Falls
- Third Falls

==== Maryland ====
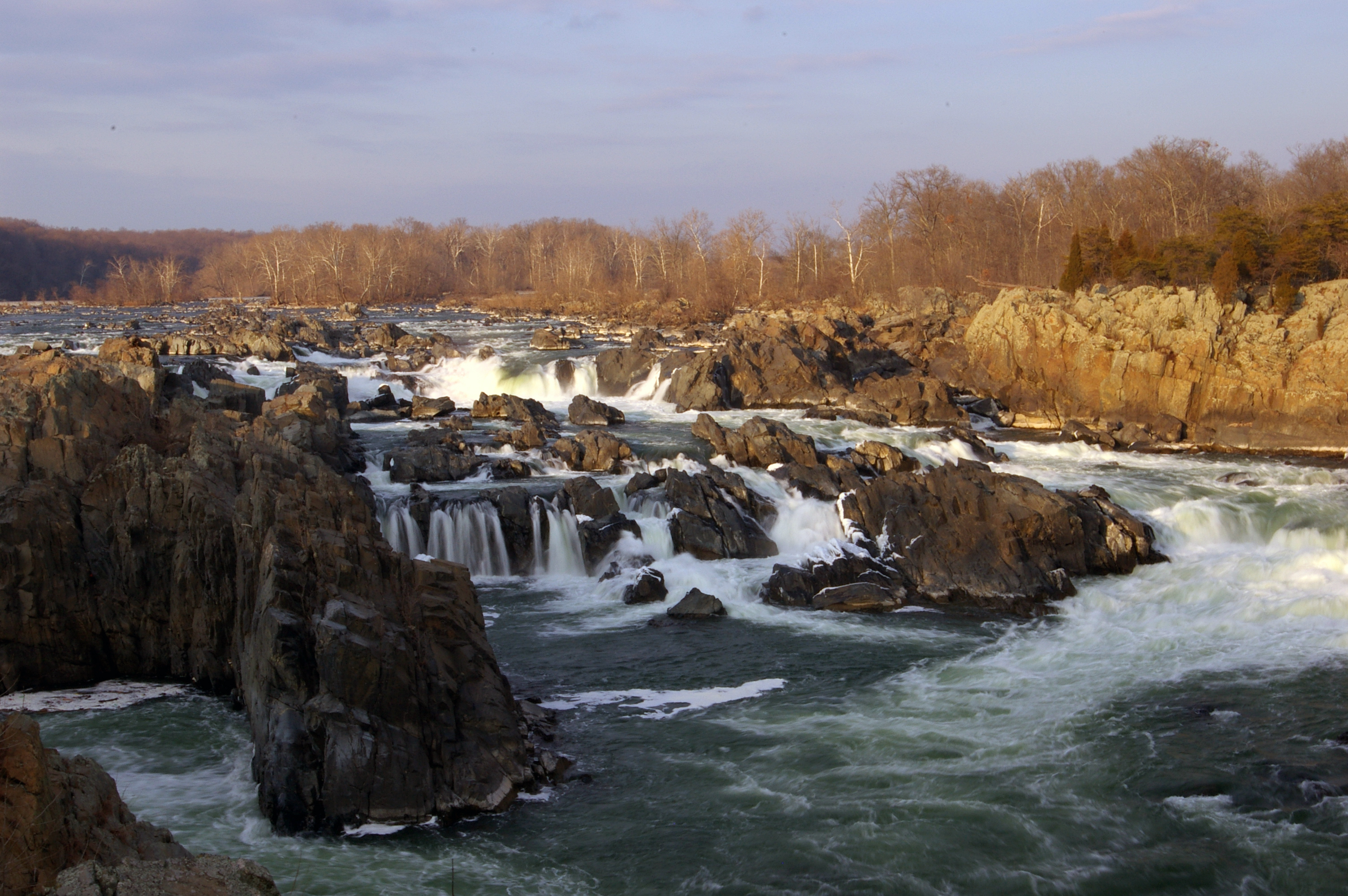
Great Falls, Virginia (L) / Maryland (R)

- Cunningham Falls – 26 m (85 ft), cascading waterfall
- Great Falls – 16 m (52 ft), cascading waterfall
- Muddy Creek Falls – 17 m (56 ft), the highest free falling waterfall in Maryland

==== Massachusetts ====
- Bash Bish Falls – 61 m (200 ft); a series of cascades with the final one being split into twin falls dropping 80-foot (24 m) over boulders to a pool below

==== Michigan ====
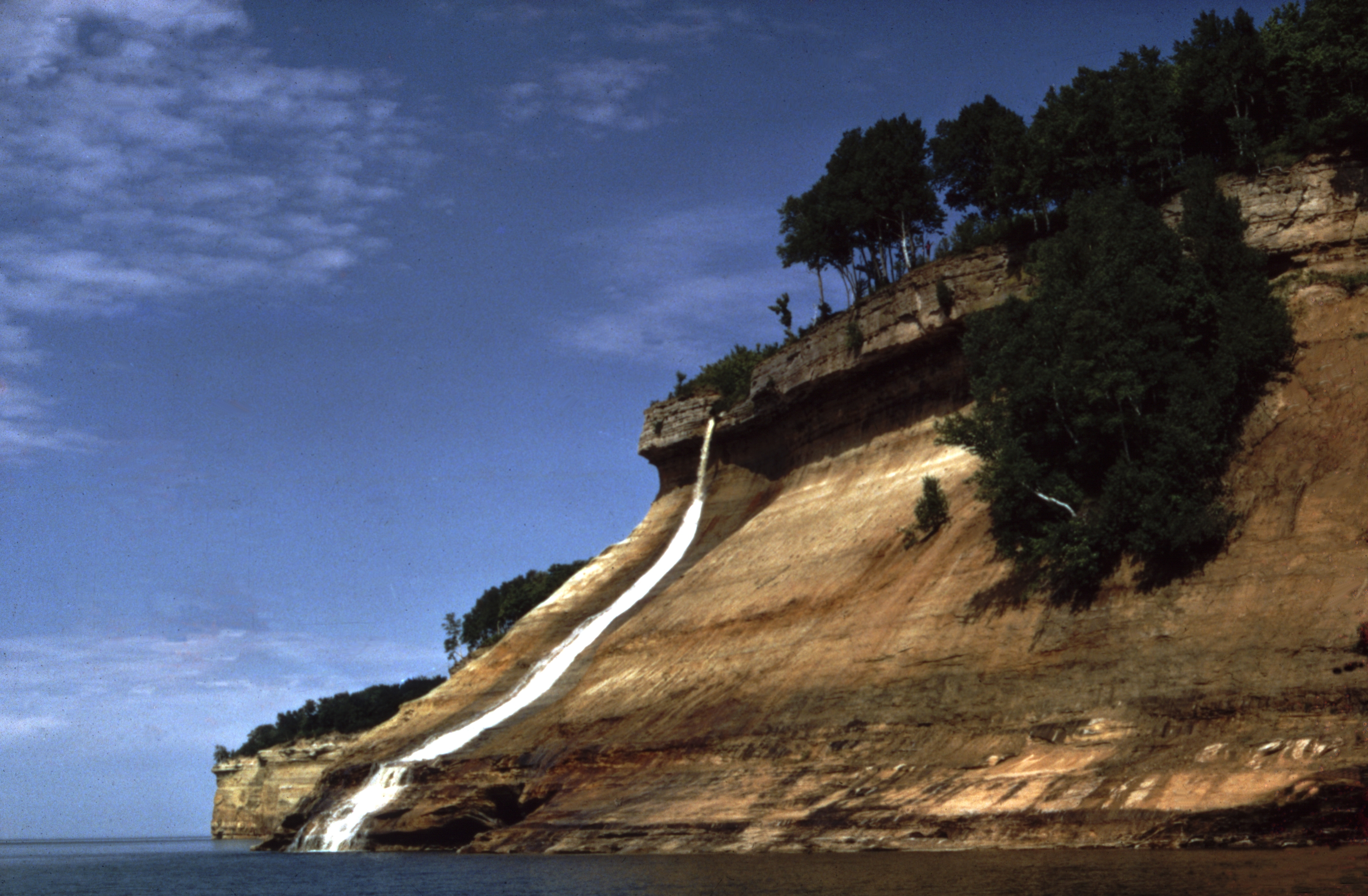
Bridal Veil Falls, Michigan

See also Category:Waterfalls of Michigan

- Bond Falls – 15 m (49 ft) cascades on the Ontonagon River
- Bridalveil Falls – 30 m (98 ft) slide into Lake Superior, in Pictured Rocks National Lakeshore
- Laughing Whitefish Falls – 30 m (98 ft)
- Munising Falls – 15 m (49 ft) sheer drop in Pictured Rocks National Lakeshore
- Tahquamenon Falls – upper falls have a 15 m (49 ft) drop, and are 61 m (200 ft) wide

==== Minnesota ====
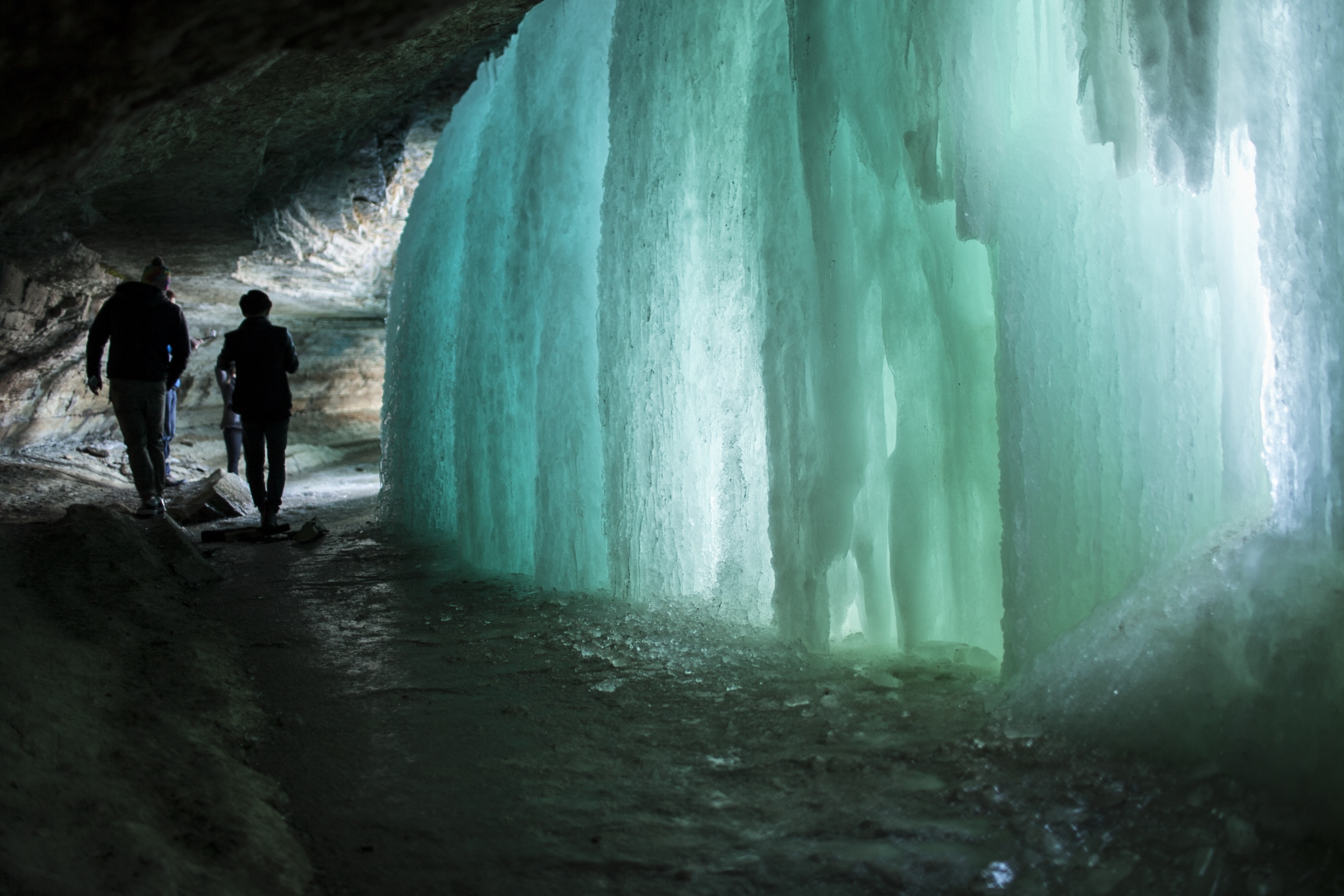
Minnehaha Falls, Minnesota

- Gooseberry Falls – North Shore of Lake Superior
- Minnehaha Falls – 16 m (52 ft) high, with a flow that varies and can freeze in winter
- Niagara Cave – a show cave with an 18.3 m (60 ft) high subterranean waterfall
- Saint Anthony Falls – the only waterfall on the Mississippi River, covered by dams in the 19th century
- Vermillion Falls – Hastings
- Wolf Creek Falls – Banning State Park

==== Missouri ====
- Marvel Cave – 15 m (50 ft), subterranean waterfall
- Mina Sauk Falls – 40 m (130 ft), highest waterfall in Missouri

==== Montana ====
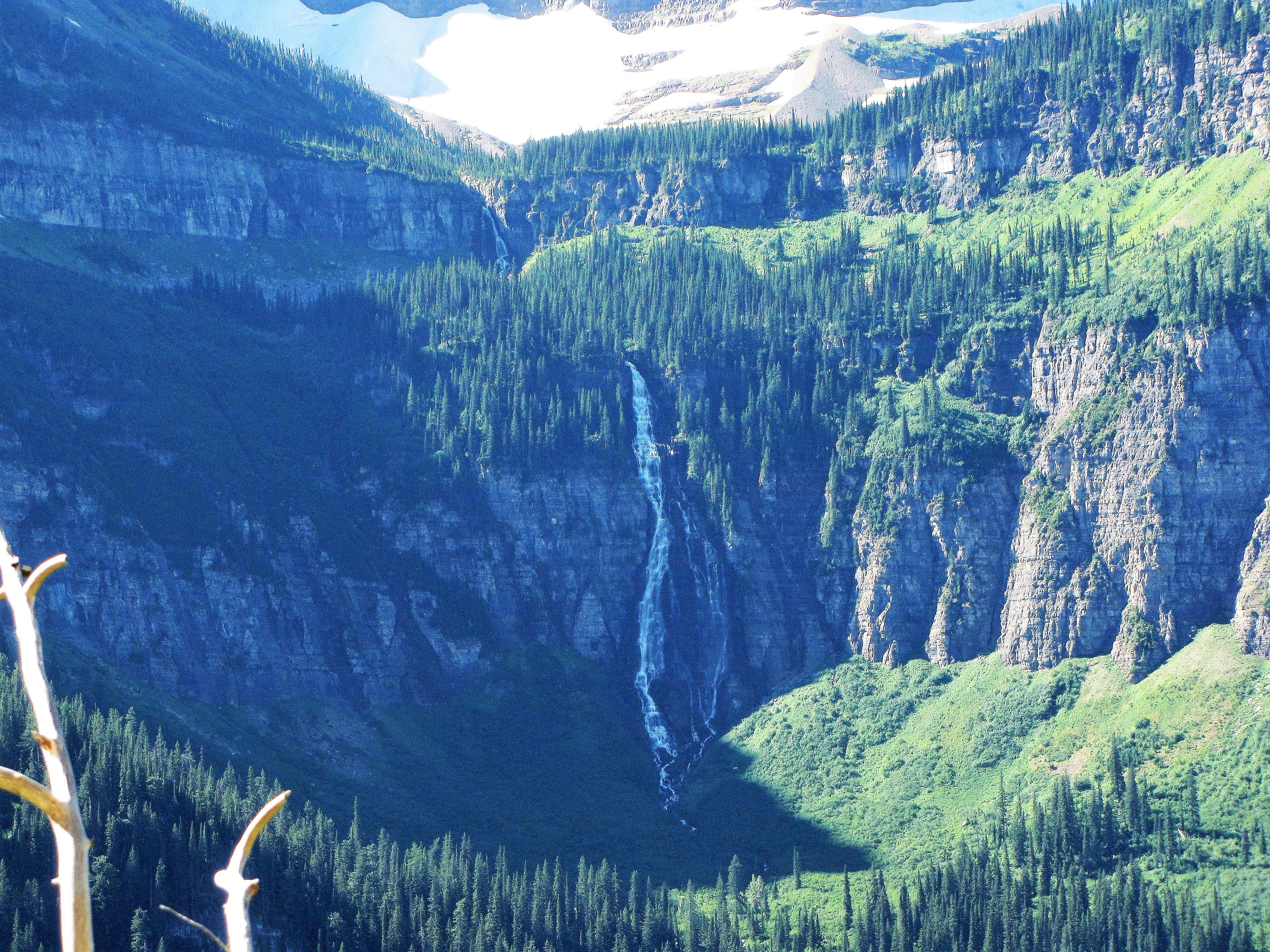
Bird Woman Falls, Glacier National Park, Montana

- Bird Woman Falls – 170 m (560 ft); in Glacier National Park
- Big Falls – 26.5 m (87 ft); highest of the Great Falls of the Missouri River
- Weeping Wall – falls onto Going-to-the-Sun Road in Glacier National Park

==== Nebraska ====
- Smith Falls – 19 m (62 ft), highest waterfall in Nebraska

==== New Hampshire ====
- Amoskeag Falls – 15 m (49 ft), on the Merrimack River
- Arethusa Falls – 43 m (141 ft), on Bemis Brook
- Diana's Baths – 23 m (75 ft), on Lucy Brook

==== New Jersey ====
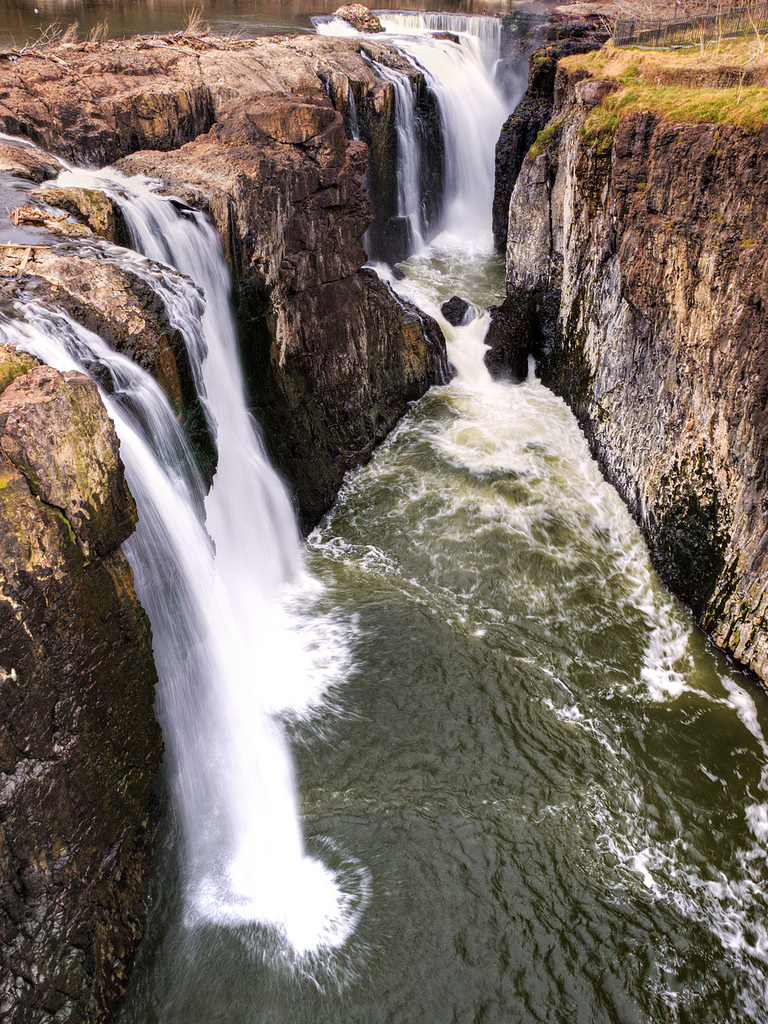
Great Falls, New Jersey

- Buttermilk Falls - 26 m (85 ft) drop; Delaware Water Gap National Recreation Area, Walpack Township
- Great Falls – 23 m (75 ft) drop; Passaic River, Paterson

==== New Mexico ====
- Jemez Falls
- Sitting Bull Falls

==== New York ====
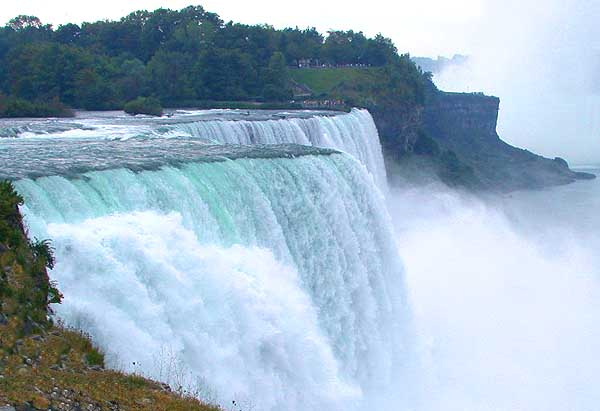
American Falls, part of Niagara Falls, New York

- American Falls – 52 m (171 ft) drop, part of Niagara Falls; highest flow rate in North America, including the Canadian Horseshoe Falls
- Barberville Falls – 28 m (92 ft) drop, in the town of Poestenkill in Rensselaer County
- Bouck's Falls – 52 m (171 ft), in the town of Fulton in Schoharie County
- Bridal Veil Falls – 55 m (180 ft) drop, part of Niagara Falls
- Buttermilk Falls – Buttermilk Falls State Park
- Chittenango Falls – 50.9 m (167 ft), in Madison County
- Cohoes Falls – 20 m (66 ft) drop, Cohoes, along the Mohawk River
- Eternal Flame Falls – 9.1 m (30 ft) cascade in Chestnut Ridge Park in Erie County; a small grotto at the waterfall's base emits natural gas, which can be lit to produce a flame
- High Falls – 29 m (95 ft), downtown Rochester
- Ithaca Falls – 46 m (151 ft) cascade, on Fall Creek in Ithaca
- Kaaterskill Falls – 53 m (174 ft) vertical drop for upper falls, total drop for two tier falls is 79 m (259 ft), in Greene County
- Lucifer Falls – 35 m (115 ft) in Robert H. Treman State Park
- Pixley Falls – 15 m (50 ft); Pixley Falls State Park in Oneida County
- Salmon River Falls – 33.5 m (110 ft) waterfall; Oswego County
- Stony Kill Falls – 27 m (89 ft), Ulster County
- Taughannock Falls – 66 m (217 ft) single, vertical drop, flowing year-round
- Trenton Falls – Trenton in Oneida County
- Upper, Middle, and Lower Falls – a series of waterfalls on the Genesee River in Letchworth State Park
- VerKeerderkill Falls – 54.6 m (179 ft) sheer drop

==== North Carolina ====
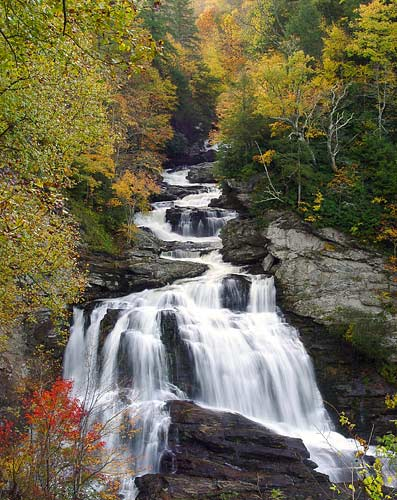
Cullasaja Falls, North Carolina

See also Category:Waterfalls of North Carolina

- Batson Creek Falls – 34 m (112 ft) waterfall that meets Connestee Falls in Transylvania County
- Bridal Veil Falls – 37 m (121 ft); DuPont State Forest
- Connestee Falls – 26 m (85 ft) tiered cascade that meets Batson Creek Falls in Transylvania County
- Corbin Creek Falls – 183 m (600 ft) series of cascades
- Cullasaja Falls – 61 m (200 ft) falls in Macon County
- Douglas Falls – 21.6 m (71 ft) plunging falls
- Dry Falls – 20 m (66 ft) sheer drop over an overhanging bluff, allowing visitors to walk behind the falls
- Eastatoe Falls – 18 m (59 ft) cascading falls located on private property near Rosman
- Glassmine Falls – 271 m (889 ft) ephemeral sliding waterfall viewable from the Blue Ridge Parkway in Buncombe County
- Hickory Nut Falls – 124 m (407 ft) horsetail waterfall at Chimney Rock State Park
- High Falls – 38 m (125 ft) drop; DuPont State Forest
- High Shoals Falls – 24.3 m (80 ft), at South Mountains State Park
- Linville Falls – 46 m (151 ft) drop over several steps, culminating in a 13.7 m (45 ft) drop
- Looking Glass Falls – 18 m (59 ft) waterfall near Brevard in Transylvania County
- Mingo Falls – 36.5 m (120 ft) just outside Great Smoky Mountains National Park
- Quarry Falls
- Rainbow Falls – 38 m (125 ft) cascade on the Horsepasture River, Jackson County
- Rainbow Falls – 49 m (161 ft) waterfall in Rutherford County
- Setrock Creek Falls – 17 m (56 ft) in the Pisgah National Forest; height disputed
- Sliding Rock – 18 m (59 ft) slide used as a natural water slide, near Brevard in Transylvania County
- Tory's Falls – 30.5 m (100 ft)
- Triple Falls – 38 m (125 ft) drop in three steps
- Upper Whitewater Falls – 126 m (413 ft) cascade

==== Ohio ====
- Brandywine Falls – 18.3 m (60 ft); Cuyahoga Valley National Park, Northfield
- Cuyahoga Falls – namesake of the city of Cuyahoga Falls
- Chagrin Falls

==== Oklahoma ====
- Turner Falls – 23 m (75 ft); in multiple steps; in the Arbuckle Mountains

==== Oregon ====
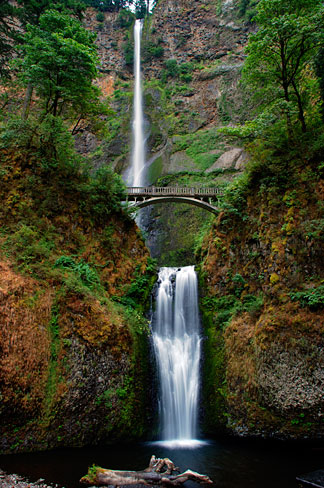
Multnomah Falls, Oregon

- Double Falls – 54 m (177 ft)
- Multnomah Falls – 189 m (620 ft) in two steps of 165 m (541 ft) and 21 m (69 ft), flowing year-round
- Toketee Falls – 36 m (118 ft) in two steps, the latter of which is over columnar basalt
- Watson Falls – 83 m (272 ft) sheer
- Willamette Falls – 12.2 m (40 ft), 460 m (1,510 ft) wide; the largest waterfall in the Northwestern United States by volume; one of the widest waterfalls in the world

==== Pennsylvania ====
- Dingmans Falls – 39.6 m (130 ft), Dingmans Falls Visitor Center, Delaware Water Gap National Recreation Area
- Fulmer Falls – 17 m (56 ft), at George W. Childs Recreation Site
- Raymondskill Falls – 32 m (105 ft) Delaware Water Gap National Recreation Area
- Silverthread Falls – 24.3 m (80 ft), Dingmans Falls Visitor Center, Delaware Water Gap National Recreation Area
- Bushkill Falls - 30.4 m (100 ft), Bushkill Falls
- Waterfalls in Ricketts Glen State Park

==== Rhode Island ====
- Pawtucket Falls

==== South Carolina ====
- Isaqueena Falls – 30 m (98 ft) cascade, near Walhalla, South Carolina
- Kings Creek Falls – 20 m (66 ft) drop, near the Chattooga River
- Raven Cliff Falls – 98 m (322 ft) drop, Caesars Head State Park
- Whitewater Falls – 61 m (200 ft) "lower" cascade, Oconee County (the larger, "upper" falls are in North Carolina)

==== South Dakota ====
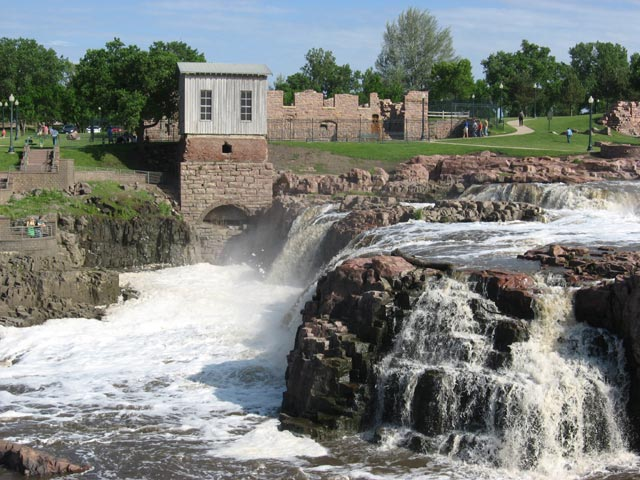
Sioux Falls, South Dakota

- Sioux Falls – namesake of the city of Sioux Falls

==== Tennessee ====
- Burgess Falls – 41 m (135 ft), Burgess Falls State Park
- Fall Creek Falls – 78 m (256 ft), Fall Creek Falls State Park, highest plunge waterfall east of the Mississippi River
- Ozone Falls – 34 m (112 ft), Ozone Falls State Natural Area
- Rockhouse Falls – 38 m (125 ft), near Spencer
- Ruby Falls – 44 m (144 ft), near Chattanooga

==== Texas ====
- Hamilton Pool Preserve – 15 m (50 ft) high falls drop into the Hamilton Pool
- Pedernales Falls State Park

==== Utah ====
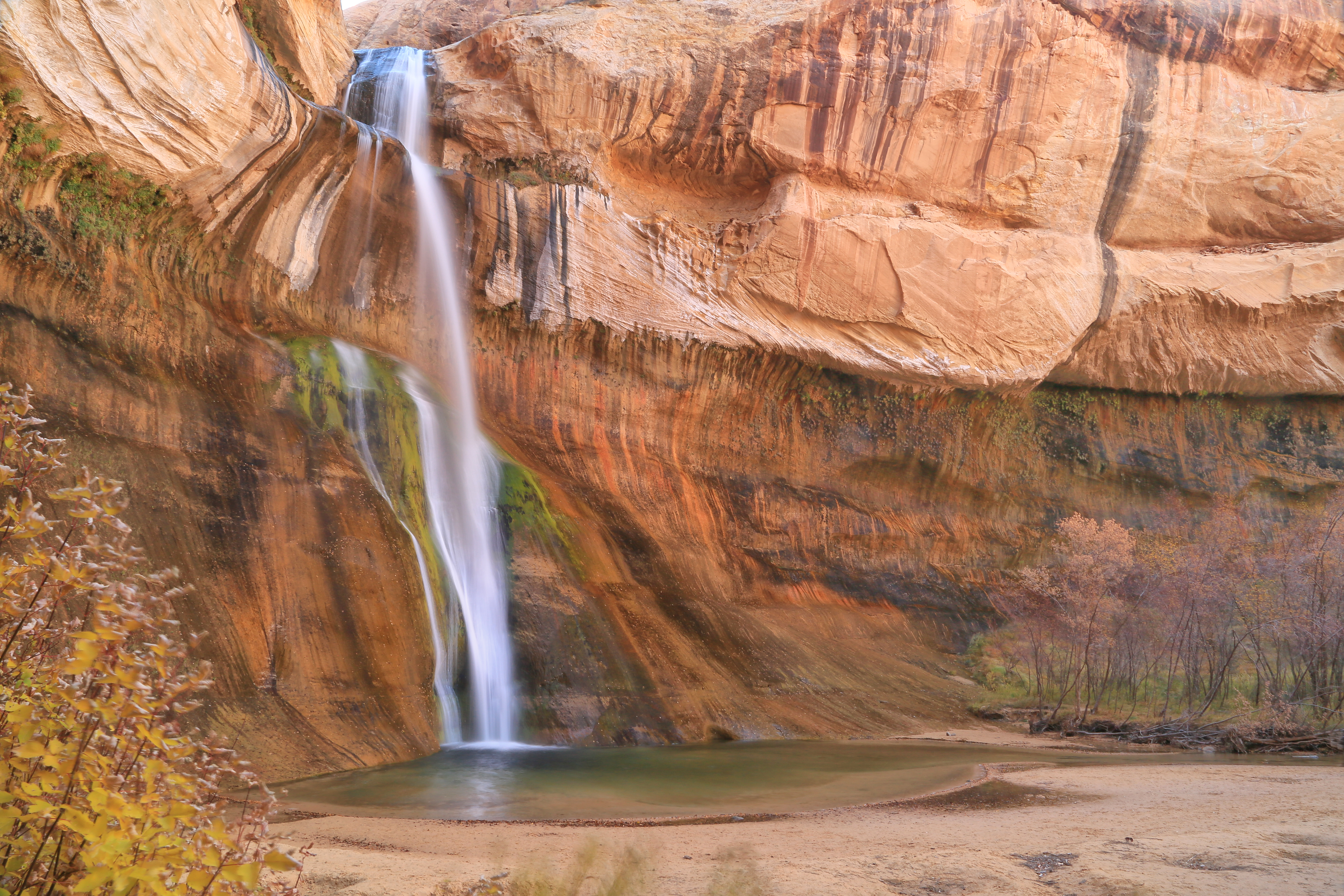
Calf Creek Falls, Utah

- Bridal Veil Falls – 185 m (607 ft) tall double cataract waterfall
- Calf Creek Falls – 65 m (213 ft) total drop over two falls; the lower drop is 38 m (125 ft) high, while the upper drop (upstream) is 27 m (89 ft) high

==== Virginia ====
- Crabtree Falls – 365.7 m (1,200 ft), cascading waterfall with a 122 m (400 ft) drop; tallest waterfall and highest single drop east of the Mississippi River
- Great Falls

==== Washington ====
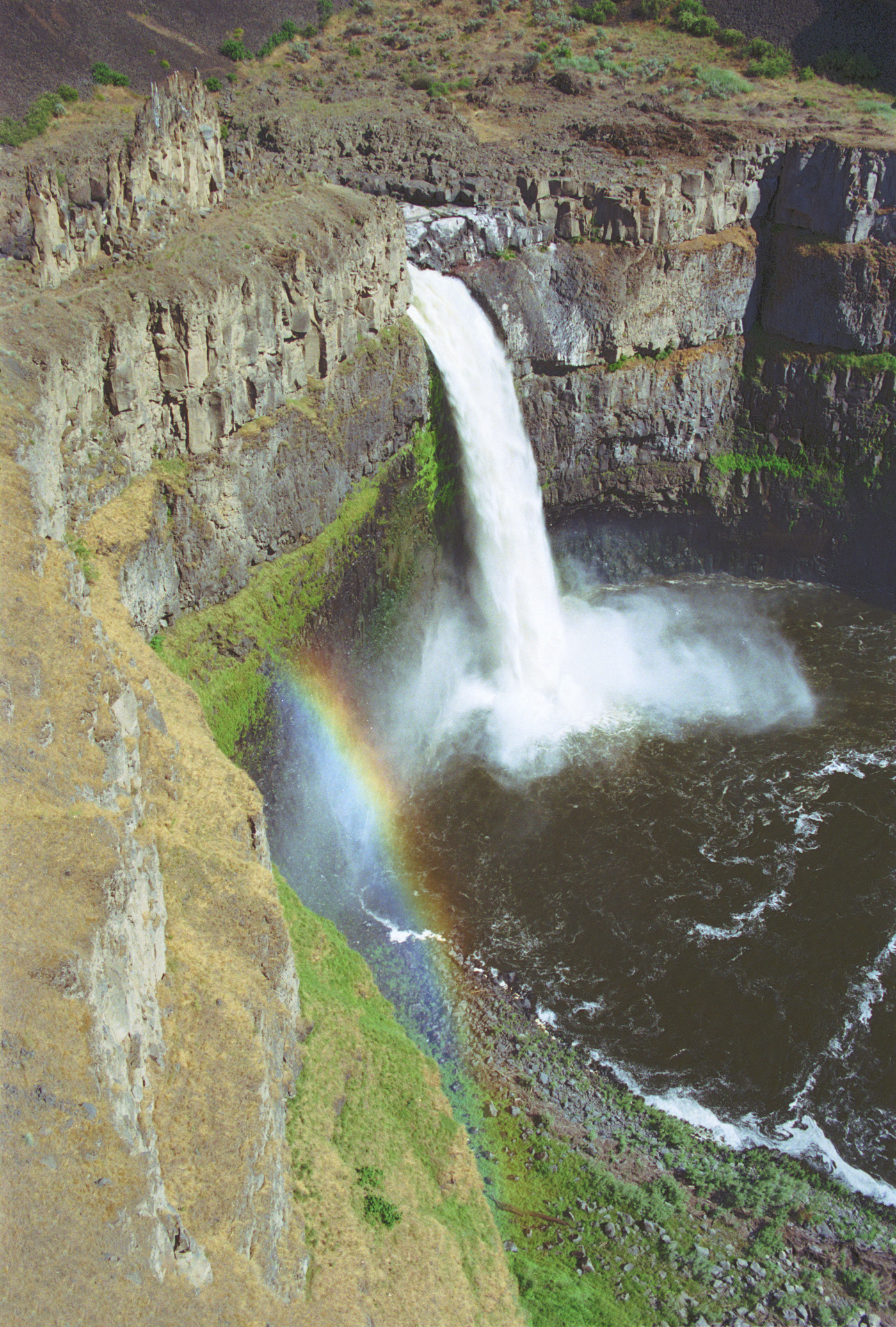
Palouse Falls, Washington

- Angeline Falls – 137 m (449 ft)
- Berdeen Falls – 259 m (850 ft)
- Blum Basin Falls – 512 m (1,680 ft)
- Bridal Veil Falls – 404 m (1,325 ft)
- Colonial Creek Falls – 788 m (2,585 ft); the tallest waterfall in the contiguous United States
- Comet Falls – 97 m (318 ft)
- Depot Creek Falls – 295 m (968 ft)
- Green Lake Falls – 298 m (978 ft)
- Langfield Falls – 17 m (56 ft)
- Mazama Falls – 152 m (499 ft)
- Palouse Falls – 60 m (200 ft)
- Pearl Falls – 122 m (400 ft)
- Rainbow Falls – 119.5 m (392 ft)
- Rainy Lake Falls – 244 m (801 ft)
- Seahpo Peak Falls – about 670 m (2,200 ft)
- Snoqualmie Falls – 82 m (269 ft)
- Spokane Falls – 44.5 m (146 ft); among the largest urban waterfalls in the United States, flowing year-round
- Sulphide Creek Falls – 665 m (2,182 ft)

==== West Virginia ====
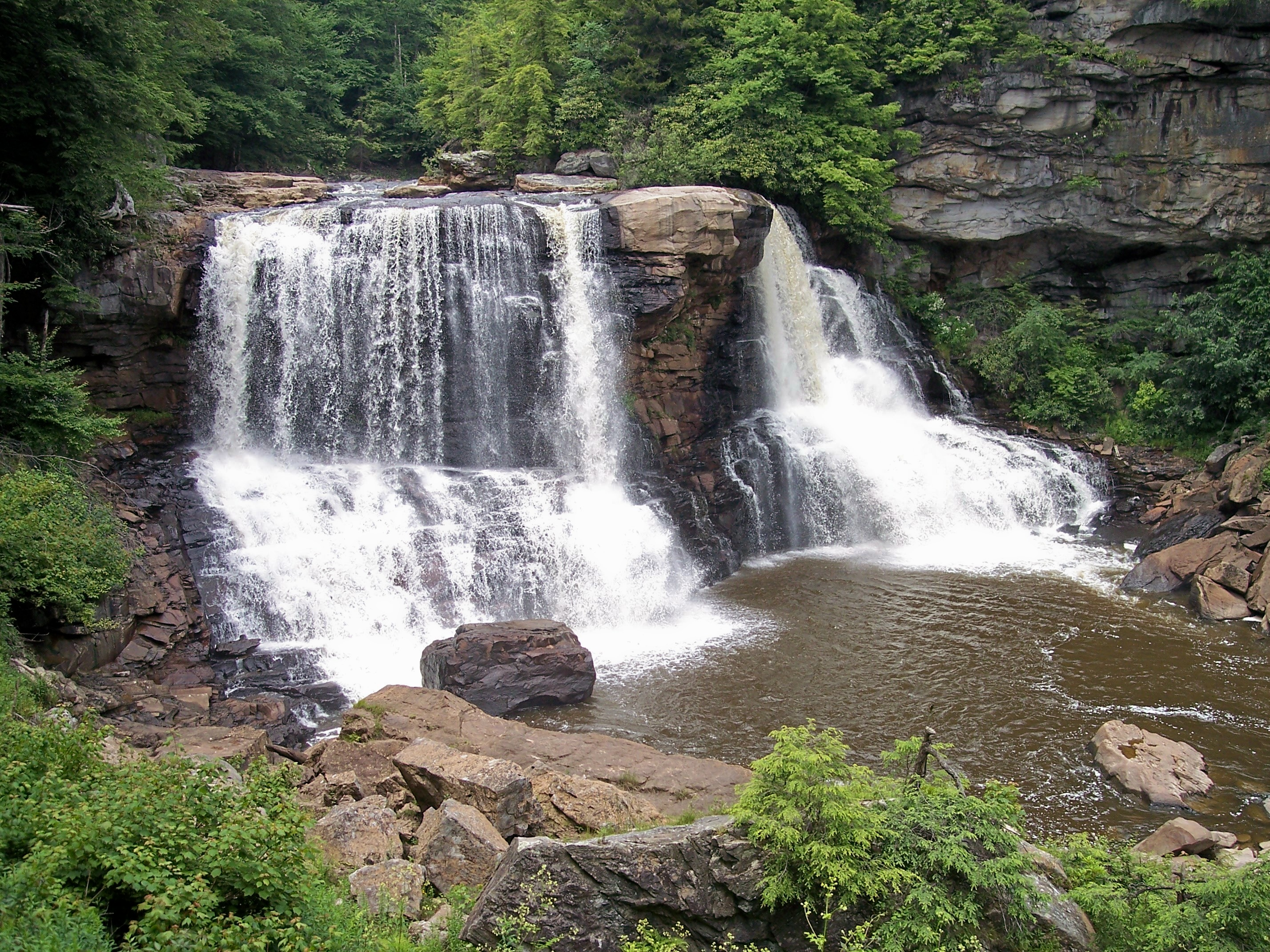
Blackwater Falls, West Virginia

- Blackwater Falls – 19 m (62 ft) sheer drop from Canaan Valley into rugged Blackwater Canyon
- Elakala Falls – Blackwater Canyon

==== Wisconsin ====
- Big Manitou Falls – 50 m (160 ft), Douglas County, highest in Wisconsin
- Grandfather Falls – 27 m (89 ft), highest waterfall on the Wisconsin River
- Superior Falls – 27 m (89 ft) on the Montreal River into Lake Superior

==== Wyoming ====
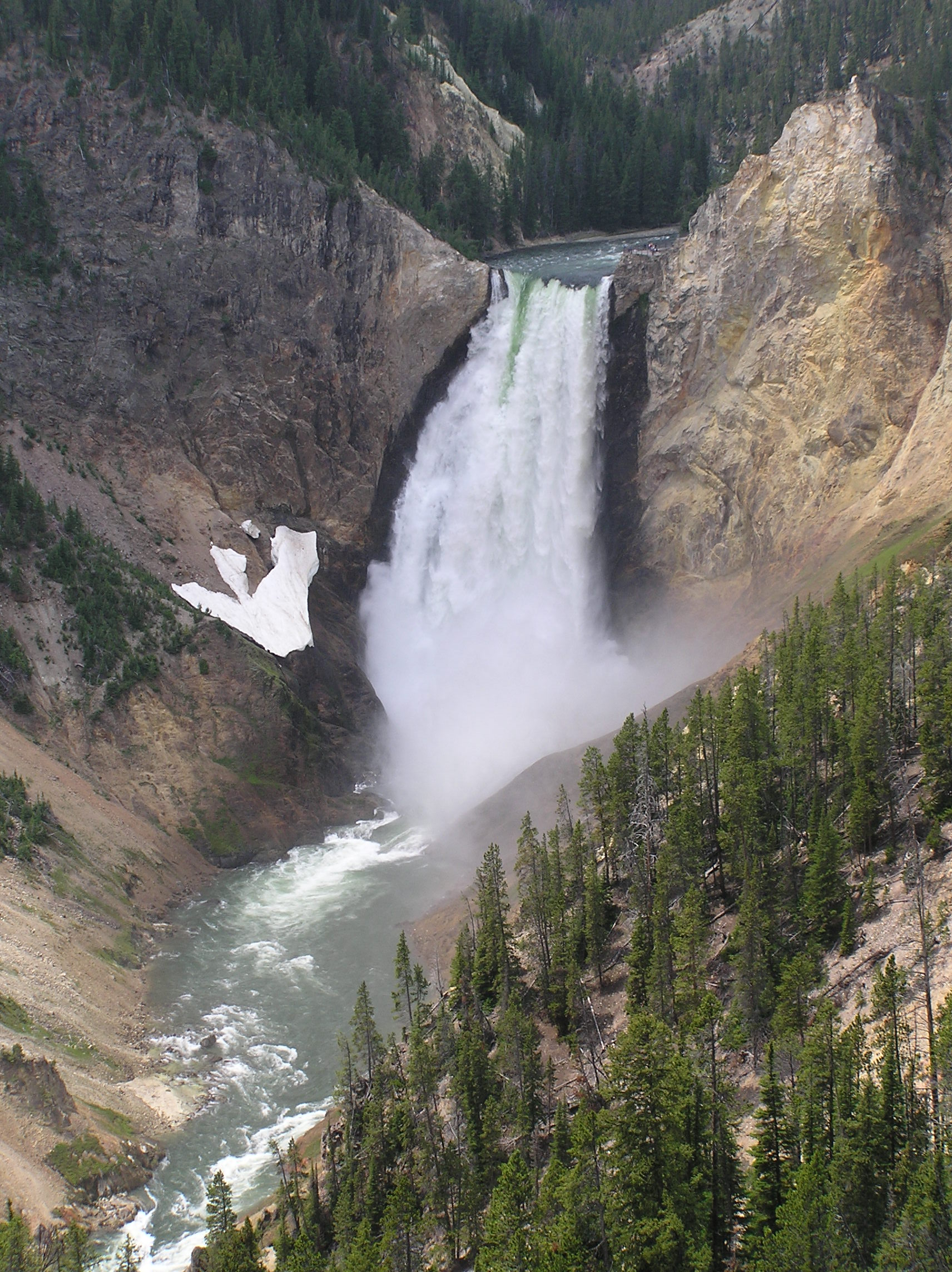
Lower Yellowstone Falls, Wyoming

- Waterfalls of Yellowstone National Park, including:
  - Colonnade Falls
  - Gibbon Falls
  - Kepler Cascades
  - Osprey Falls
  - Silver Cord Cascade – 366 m (1,200 ft); the tallest waterfall in Yellowstone
  - Terraced Falls
  - Tower Fall
  - Union Falls
  - Virginia Cascades
  - Yellowstone Falls – the lower falls are 94 m (308 ft) high and the upper falls are 33 m (108 ft) high; largest volume falls in the U.S. Rocky Mountains; plunge type flowing year-round

== Oceania ==
=== Australia ===
==== New South Wales ====
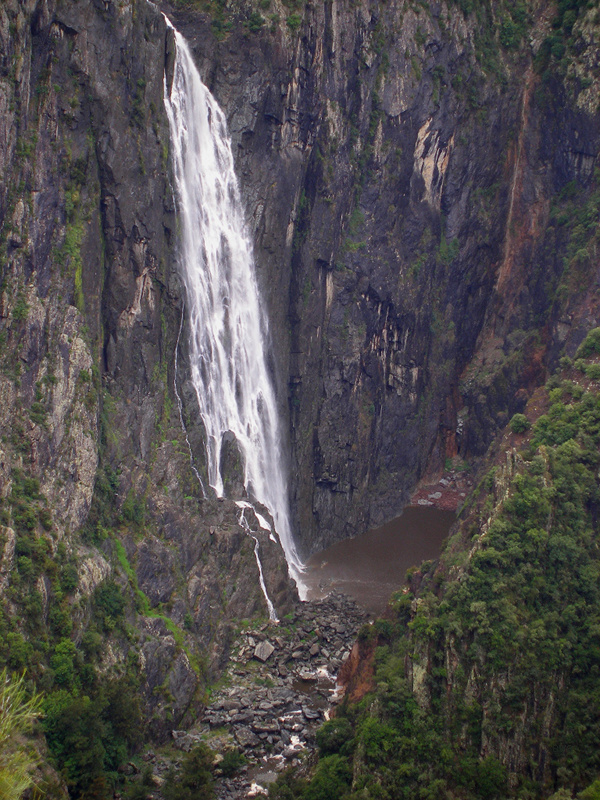
Wollomombi Falls, New South Wales

- Apsley Falls
- Belmore Falls
- Carrington Falls
- Ebor Falls
- Ellenborough Falls – 160 m (520 ft), one of the highest in Australia
- Fitzroy Falls
- Tin Mine Falls – estimated 360–459 m (1,181–1,506 ft) including many segments above main drop; possibly the longest, highest in Australia
- Wentworth Falls
- Wollomombi Falls – 220 m (720 ft), second or third highest in Australia

==== Northern Territory ====
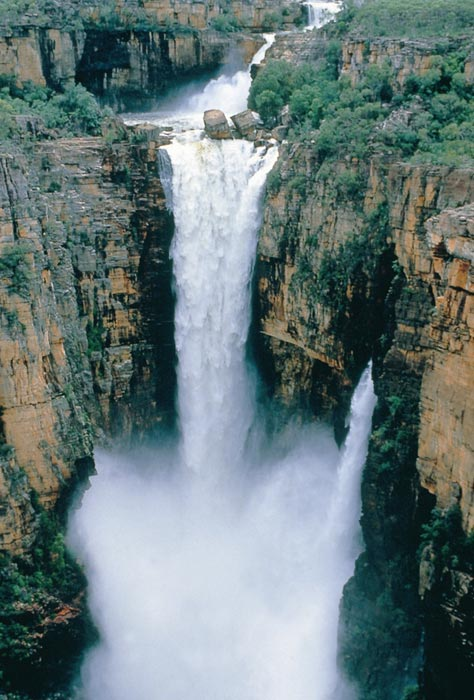
Jim Jim Falls during the wet season, Kakadu National Park, Northern Territory

- Florence Falls – Aboriginal name is Karrimurra
- Gunlom Falls – formerly Waterfall Creek Falls
- Jim Jim Falls – Aboriginal name is Barrkmalam
- Tjaynera Falls
- Tolmer Falls
- Twin Falls – Aboriginal name is Gungkurdul
- Wangi Falls

==== Queensland ====
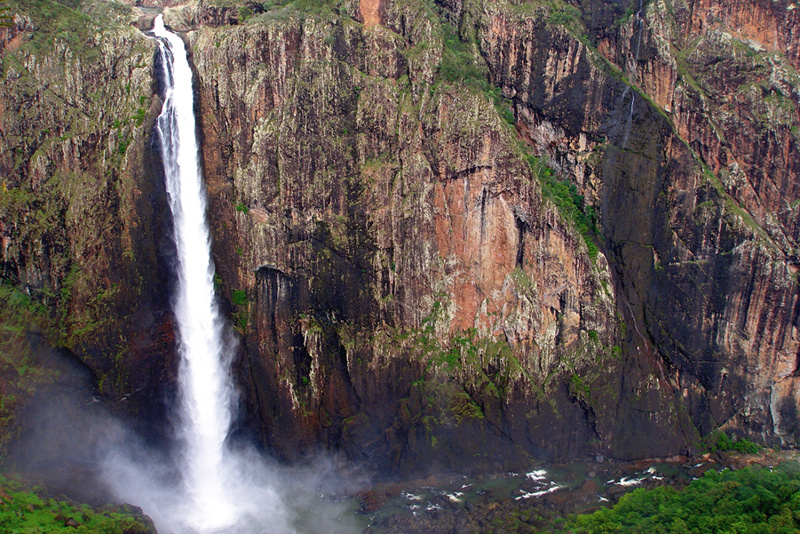
Wallaman Falls, Queensland – highest single drop in Australia

- Barron Falls
- Bilbrough Falls
- Blencoe Falls
- Bloomfield Falls
- Browns Falls
- Clamshell Falls
- Coomera Falls
- Daggs Falls
- Davies Creek Falls
- Dinner Falls
- Herbert River Falls
- Josephine Falls
- Kearneys Falls
- Leichhardt Falls
- Malanda Falls
- Millaa Millaa Falls
- Millstream Falls
- Milmilgee Falls
- Morans Falls
- Murray Falls
- Purling Brook Falls
- Queen Mary Falls
- Simpson Falls
- Stoney Creek Falls
- Teviot Falls
- Tinaroo Falls
- Tully Falls
- Wallaman Falls – 305 m (1,001 ft) over multiple drops with a 268 m (879 ft) single drop; first or second highest in Australia after Tin Mine Falls
- Whites Falls
- Wongalee Falls
- Yarrbilgong Falls

==== South Australia ====
- First Falls in Waterfall Gully – 25m

==== Tasmania ====
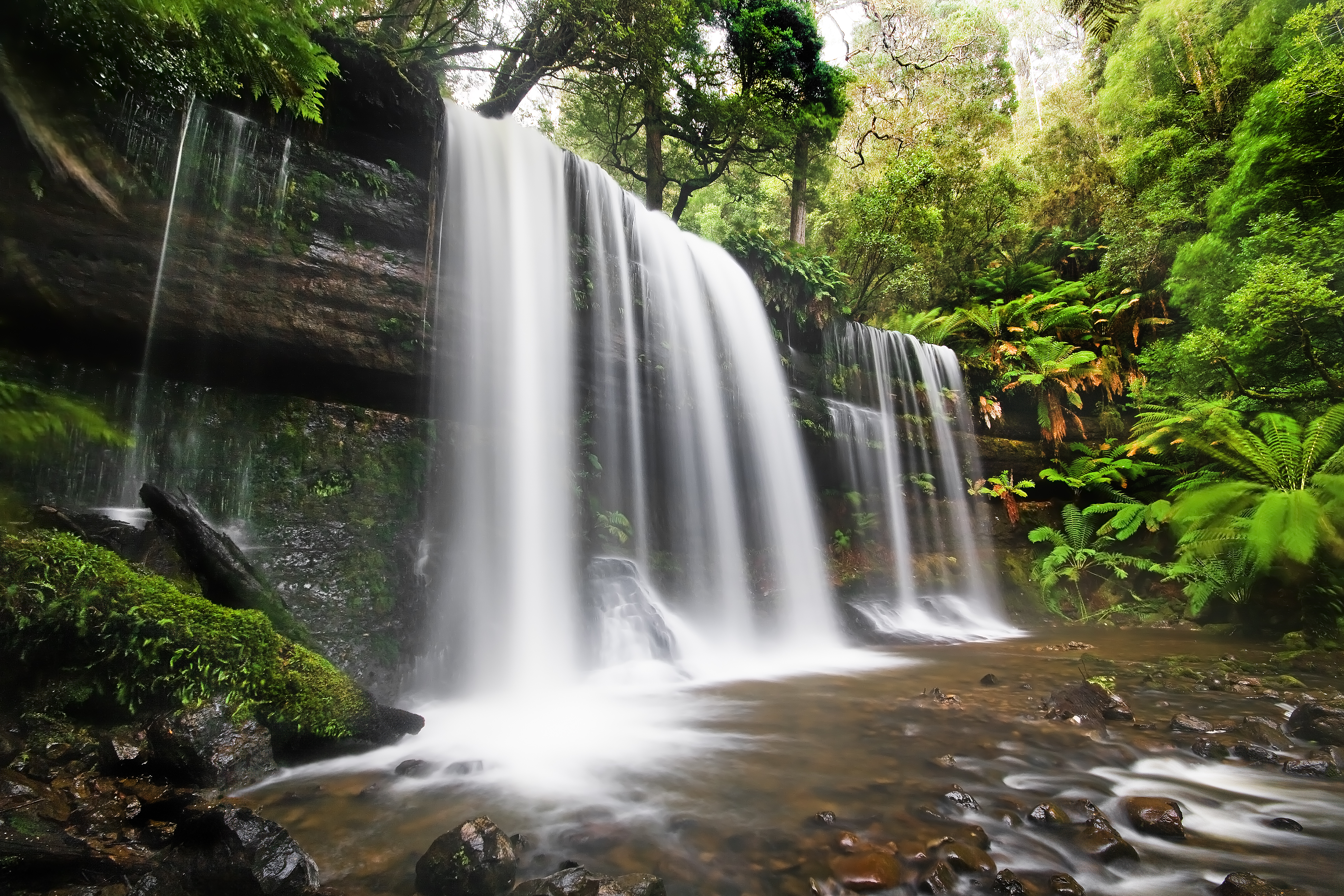
Russell Falls, Tasmania

- Adamsons Falls
- Delaneys Falls
- Dip Falls
- Guide Falls
- Horseshoe Falls
- Lady Barron Falls
- Liffey Falls
- Montezuma Falls
- Nelson Falls
- Pelverata Falls
- Russell Falls
- Slippery Falls

==== Victoria ====
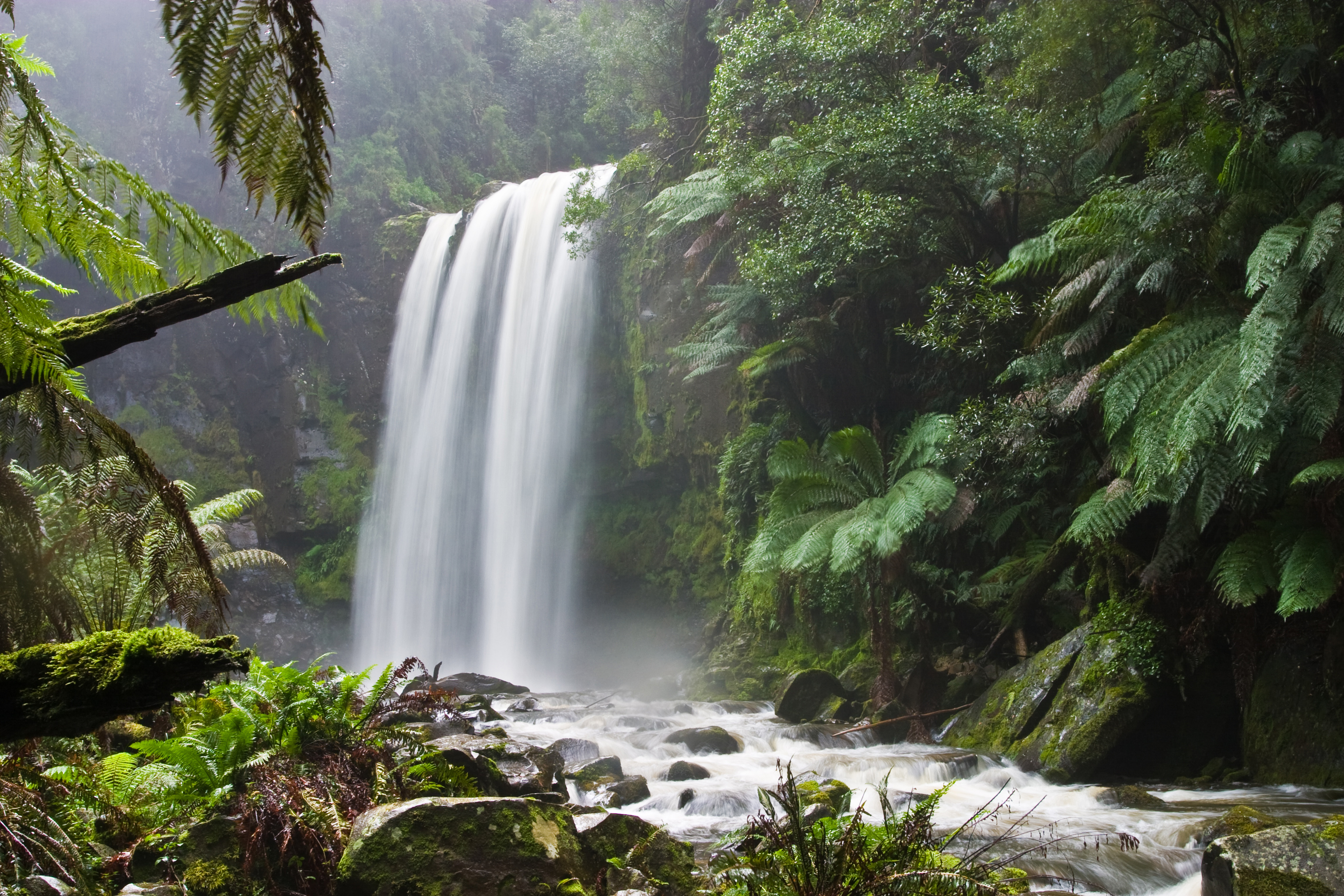
Hopetoun Falls, Victoria

- Beauchamp Falls
- Buckley Falls
- Erskine Falls
- Hopetoun Falls
- Little Aire Falls
- Nigretta Falls
- Sabine Falls
- Silverband Falls – Grampians National Park
- Steavenson Falls
- Triplet Falls – Great Otway National Park
- Wannon Falls

=== French Polynesia ===
- Fautaua Falls

=== Hawaiian Islands ===
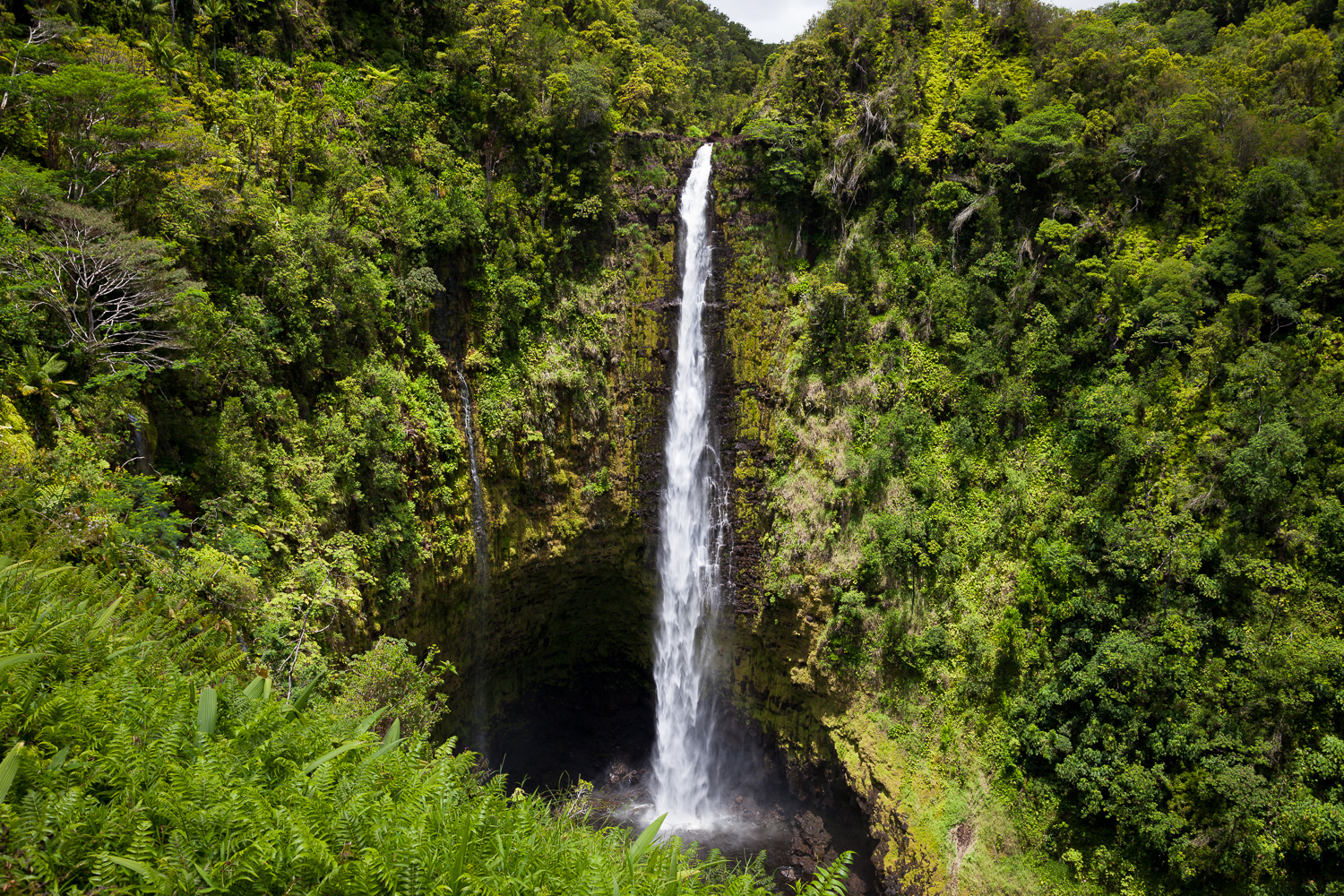
Akaka Falls, Hawaiʻi

- Akaka Falls – 135 m (443 ft) drop, Hawaiʻi (hereafter meaning the Big Island)
- Hanakapiai Falls – 91 m (300 ft) drop, Kauai
- Hiilawe Falls – 442 m (1,450 ft) drop, Waipio Valley, Hawaiʻi
- Kahiwa Falls – 533 m (1,750 ft) drop, Molokai
- Makahiku Falls – 61 m (200 ft) drop, Maui
- Manawaiopuna Falls – 122 m (400 ft) drop, Kauai
- Manoa Falls – 50 metres (160 ft) drop, Oahu
- Oloʻupena Falls – 900 m (2,953 ft) drop, Molokaʻi north shore; highest waterfall in the U.S. and 4th highest waterfall in the world
- 'Opaeka'a Falls – 46 m (151 ft) drop, Kauaʻi east shore
- Papalaua Falls – 380 m (1,250 ft) drop, Molokaʻi
- Pu'uka'oku Falls – 840 m (2,760 ft) drop, Molokaʻi; 8th highest waterfall in the world
- Rainbow Falls- 24 m (80 ft) drop, Hawaiʻi
- Waihīlau Falls – 793 m (2,600 ft) drop, Hawaiʻi
- Wailua Falls – 53 m (174 ft) drop, Kauaʻi east shore

=== New Zealand ===
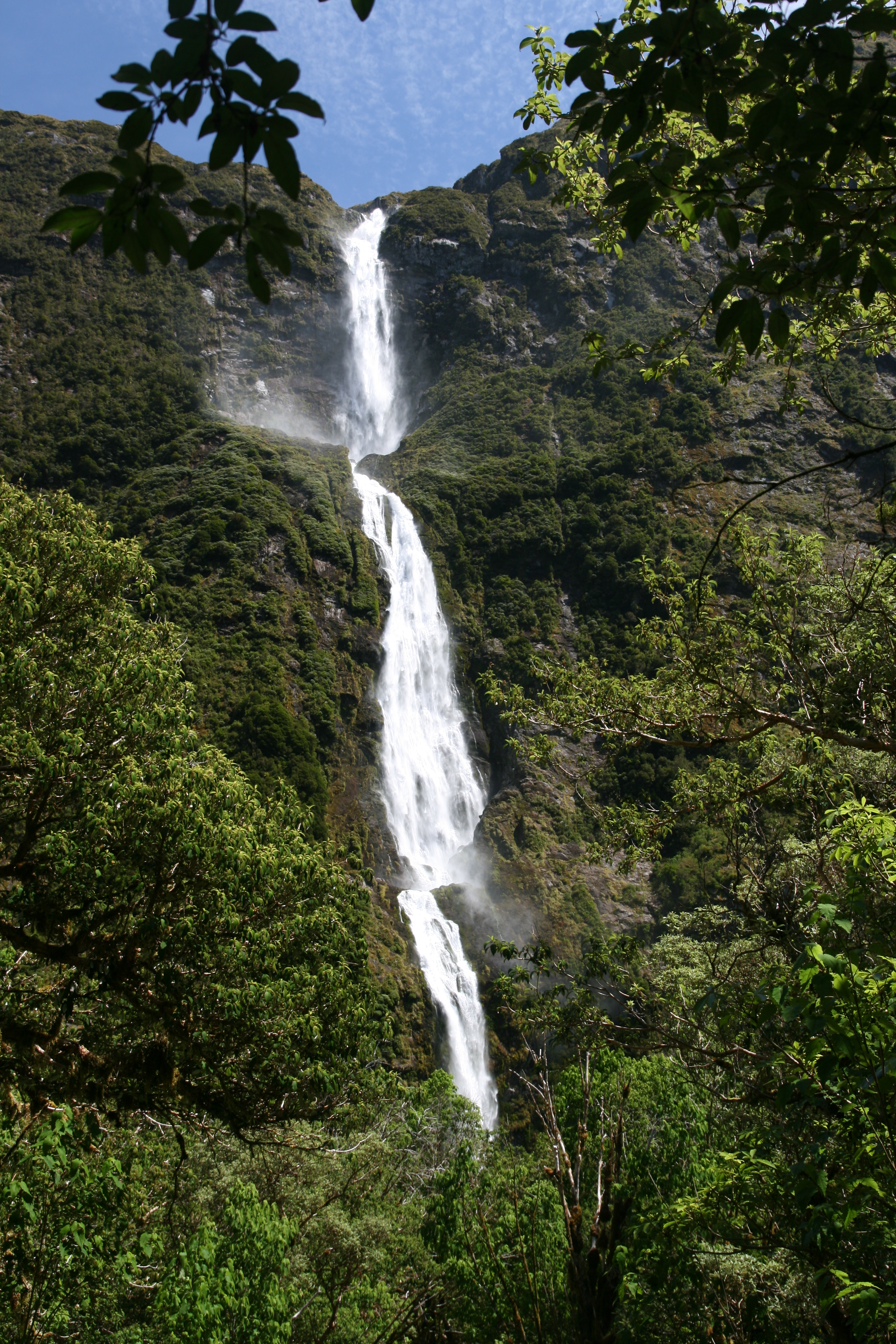
Sutherland Falls, New Zealand

- Āniwaniwa Falls (Rainbow Falls)
- Bridal Veil Falls – 55 m (180 ft) plunge waterfall along the Pakoka River, Waikato
- Browne Falls – cascades 619 m (2,031 ft) or 836 m (2,743 ft), depending on source
- Huka Falls
- Humboldt Falls
- Kitekite Falls – 40 m (130 ft) 3-tiered waterfall near Auckland
- Lady Alice Falls – 200 m (660 ft) horsetail in Doubtful Sound
- Madonna Falls
- Mōkau Falls
- Mount Damper Falls
- Owharoa Falls
- Purakaunui Falls
- Rainbow Falls (Waianiwaniwa)
- Sutherland Falls – one of the highest waterfalls in New Zealand, at 580 m (1,900 ft)
- Tarawera Falls
- Wairere Falls – highest in the North Island at 153 m (502 ft)
- Whangārei Falls

=== Solomon Islands ===
- Tenaru Falls

== South America ==
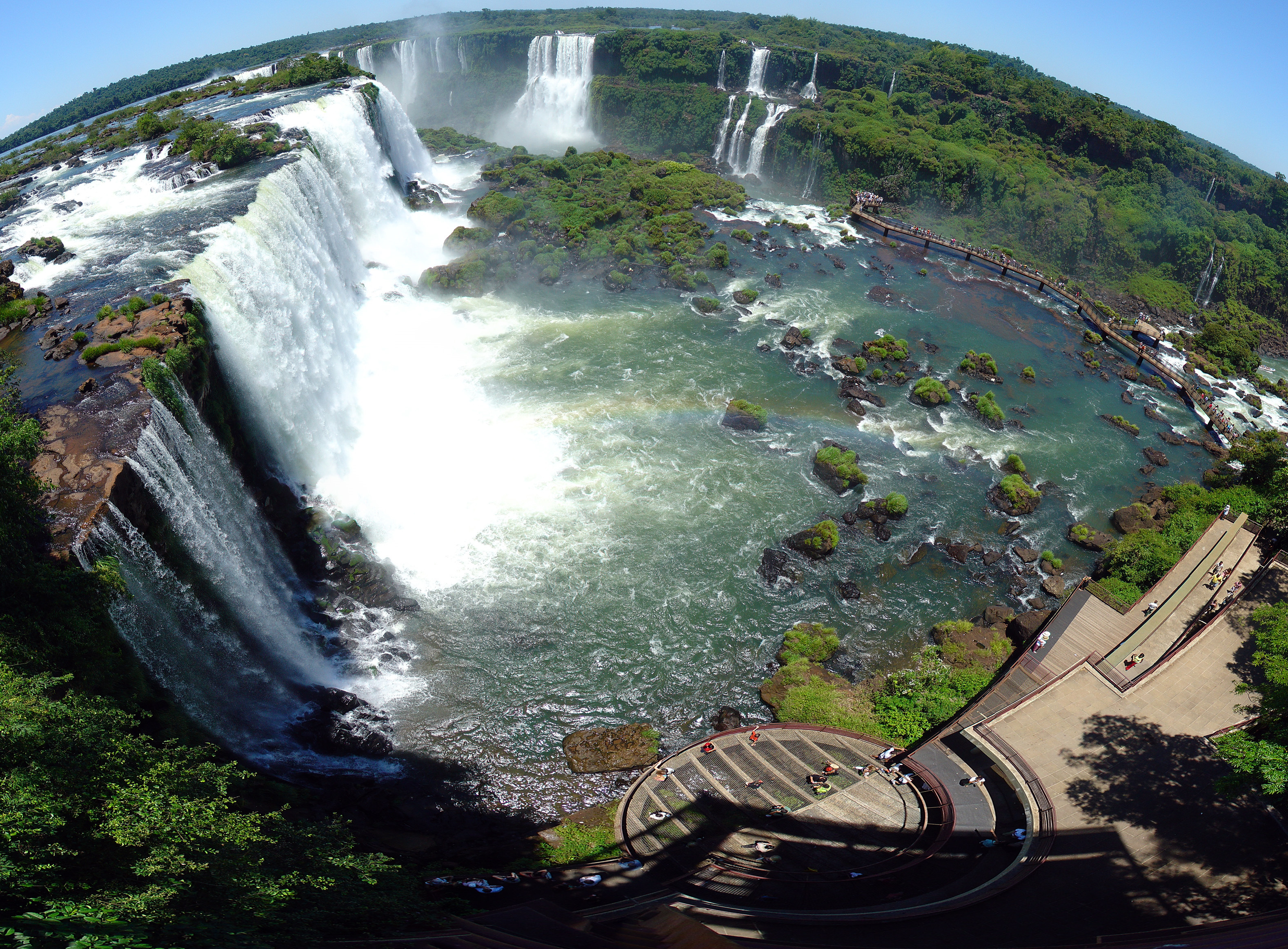
Iguazu Falls, Argentina / Brazil border – highest flow rate in South America

=== Argentina ===
- Iguazu Falls – Spanish: Cataratas del Iguazú; also spelled Iguazú, Iguassu, Iguaçu; Puerto Iguazú, Misiones Province; largest waterfall system in the world; highest flow rate in South America

=== Brazil ===
- Guaíra Falls – Portuguese: Salto das Sete Quedas do Guaíra; Sete Quedas, on the Brazil–Paraguay border
- Iguazu Falls – Portuguese: Cataratas do Iguaçu; Foz do Iguaçu, Paraná; highest flow rate in South America
- Smoke Falls – 340 m (1,120 ft) high; Portuguese: Cachoeira da Fumaça; Chapada Diamantina National Park, Bahia
- Waterfall Park – Portuguese: Parque da Cascata; Sete Lagoas, Minas Gerais

=== Chile ===
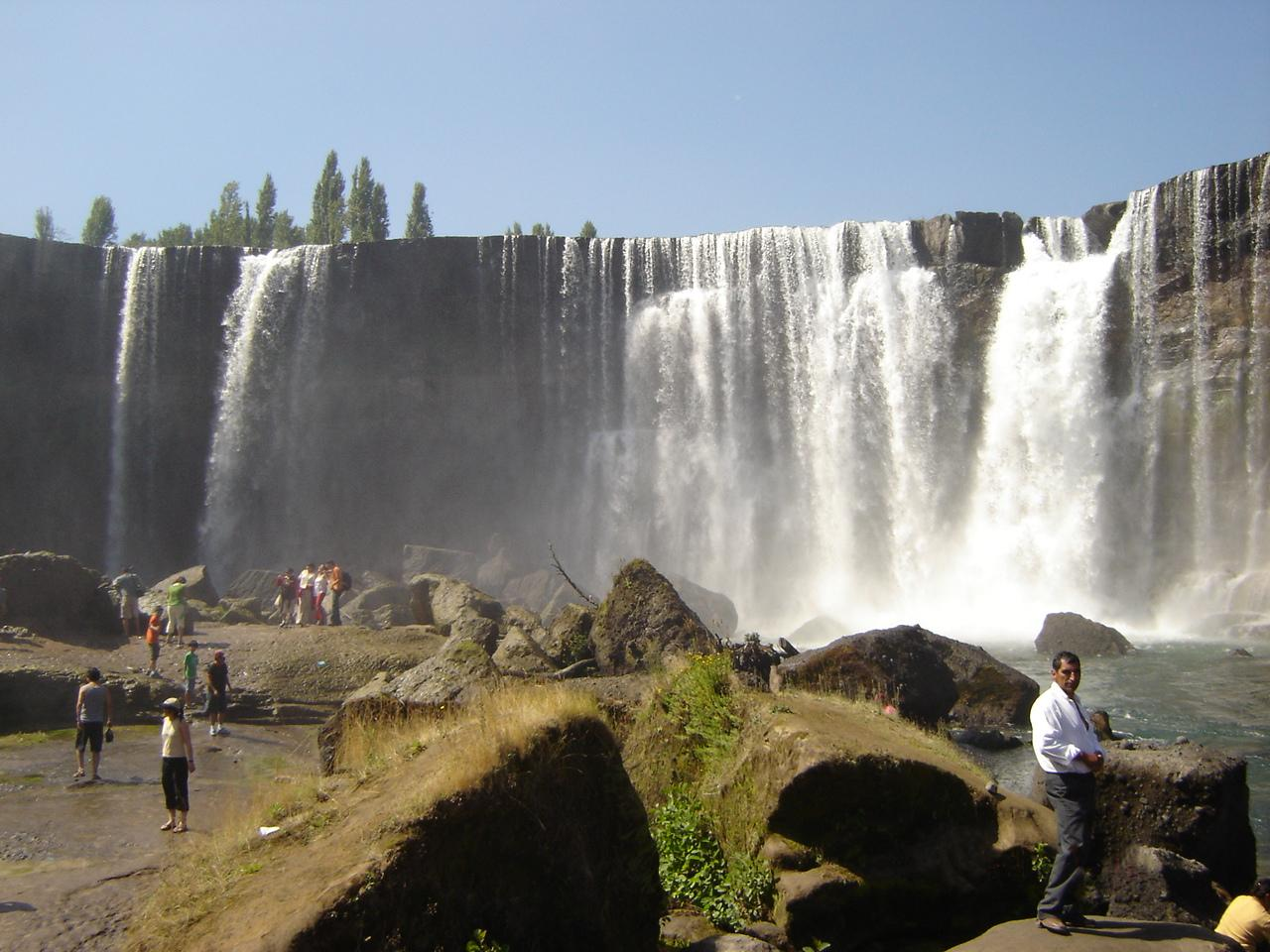
Laja Falls, Chile

- Huilo-Huilo Falls
- Laja Falls – Spanish: Salto del Laja
- Petrohué Falls – Spanish: Saltos del Petrohué

=== Colombia ===
- Tequendama Falls – 132 m (433 ft) high; Spanish: Salto del Tequendama; Cundinamarca
- Tequendamita Falls

=== Guyana ===
- Kaieteur Falls
- King Edward VIII Falls

=== Paraguay ===
- Guaíra Falls – Spanish: Saltos del Guairá; Sete Quedas, on the Brazil-Paraguay border
- Monday Falls – Spanish: Saltos del Monday; along the Monday River

=== Peru ===
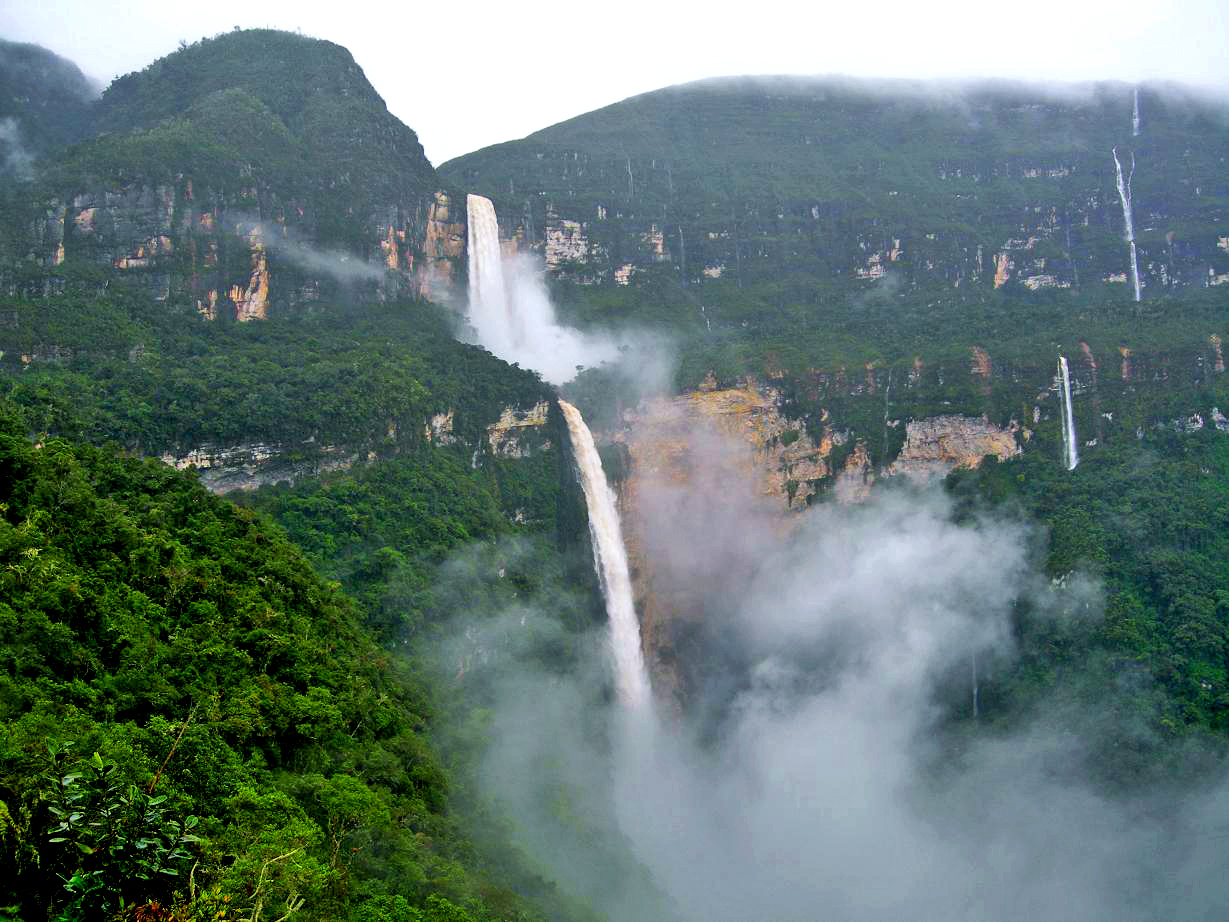
Gocta Falls, Peru

- Gocta Falls – Spanish: Catarata del Gocta
- Three Sisters Falls – 914 m (2,999 ft) high; Spanish: Cataratas Tres Hermanas; highest falls in Peru and may be the 3rd highest in the world
- Yumbilla Falls

=== Venezuela ===
- Angel Falls – 979 m (3,212 ft); Spanish: Salto Ángel; the highest waterfall in the world
- Cuquenan Falls – Spanish: Salto Kukenan
- Llovizna Falls
- Pará Falls
- Yutaje Falls

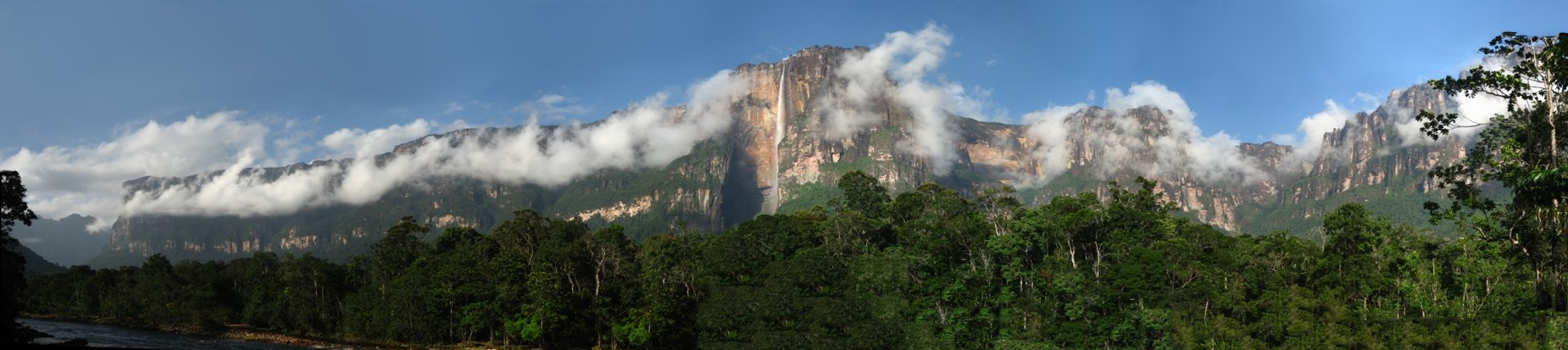
Angel Falls, Canaima National Park, Venezuela

== See also ==
- List of waterfalls by flow rate
- List of waterfalls by height
- List of waterfalls by type
- Dry Falls
