= Jhor Mahankal =

Jhor Mahankal झोरमहांकाल
- Tokha village
- Location in Nepal
- Coordinates: 27.48°N 85.20°E
- Country: Nepal
- Province: Bagmati Province
- District: Kathmandu District

Population (2011)
  - Total: 4,103
- Time zone: UTC+5:45 (Nepal Time)

Jhor Mahankal is a village and former village development committee which is part of the Tokha municipality in Kathmandu District, Bagmati Province of central Nepal. It had a population of 4,103 in the 2011 Nepal census, with 873 households. Jhor Mahankal is known for Baruneshwar Gufa (Baruneshwar in Swosthani Katha) and its waterfalls. A number of clans live there, primarily the Adhikaris ("Officer" in English), Lamichanne, Dulals, Bidari, and Tamang. Jhor Mahankal is 7 kilometres (4.3 mi) from Kathmandu, with bus service from the Jhor bus station to Simalchour Syampati and Samakhushi and Ratna Park in Kathmandu.

== Location ==
The village is 9 kilometres (5.6 mi) north of the Kathmandu ring road, near Samakhushi and Shivapuri Nagarjun National Park, on the border between Kathmandu and Nuwakot Districts. Budhanilkantha is to the east, Sangla to the west, Shivapuri and Nuwakot District to the north, and Tokha Chandeshwori to the south.

== Waterfall ==
Jhor waterfall is popular with Kathmandu residents, particularly teenagers.
