= Kumari Temple =

- कुमारी मन्दिर
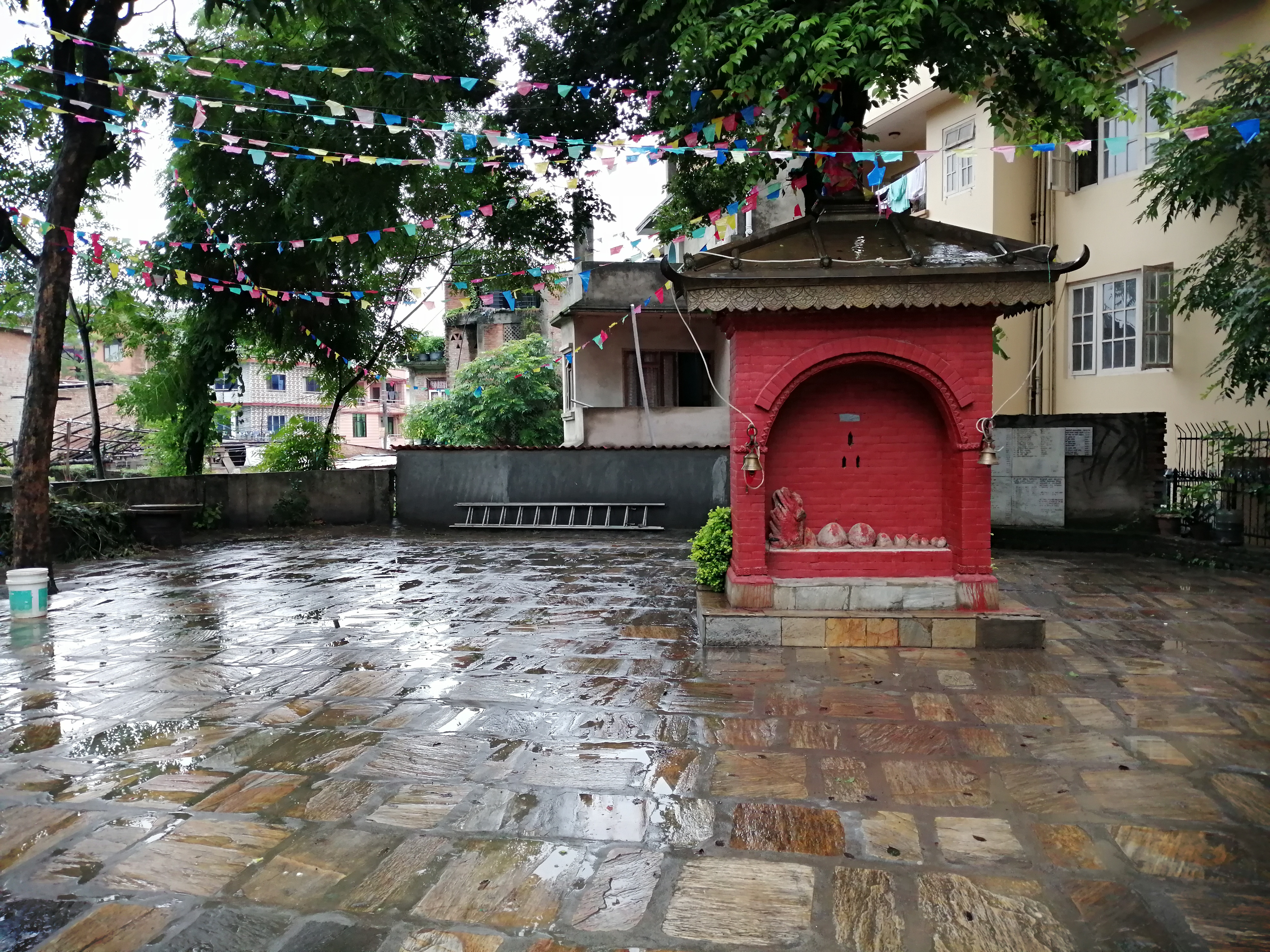
- Kumari Temple of Samakhusi, Kathmandu

- Location in Nepal

Religion
- Affiliation: Hinduism
- District: Kathmandu
- Province: Bagmati Province
- Deity: devi

Location
- Location: Kathmandu
- Country: Nepal
- Coordinates: 27°42′35″N 85°20′55″E

Architecture
- Temple: 1

The Kumari Temple (Nepali: कुमारी मन्दिर) is a local Hindu temple located in Samakhusi, Nepal. This is a local temple where people can gather and organize small events, function, Vivaah and many other activities.

The temple has a 3-story building to store the things as well as conduct the Yoga. This is also place for old people service center where people can sing Bhajan and Dance. This is used by old people to pass time.

Local people of Samakhusi, where they can not go far for their Prayers they come here to Pray. From this temple name the area also named as kumari tole.

== History ==
It was built by king Jaya Prakesh Malla in 1757. It was originally used to house the "Living Goddess" the Royal Kumari. Now it is mostly used for tourism and ceremonial purposes.

== Gallery ==
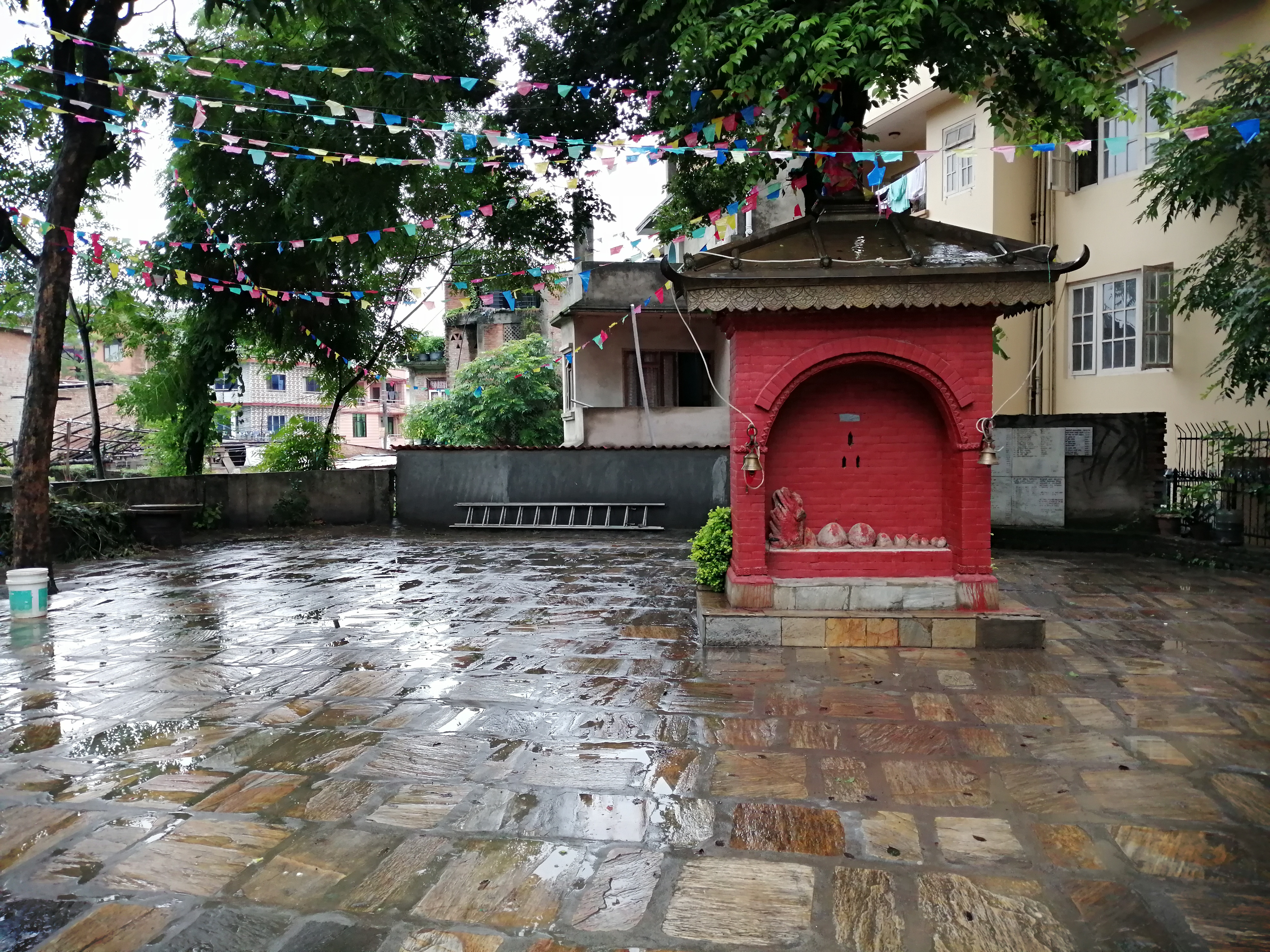
Kumari Temple of Samakhusi Kathmandu

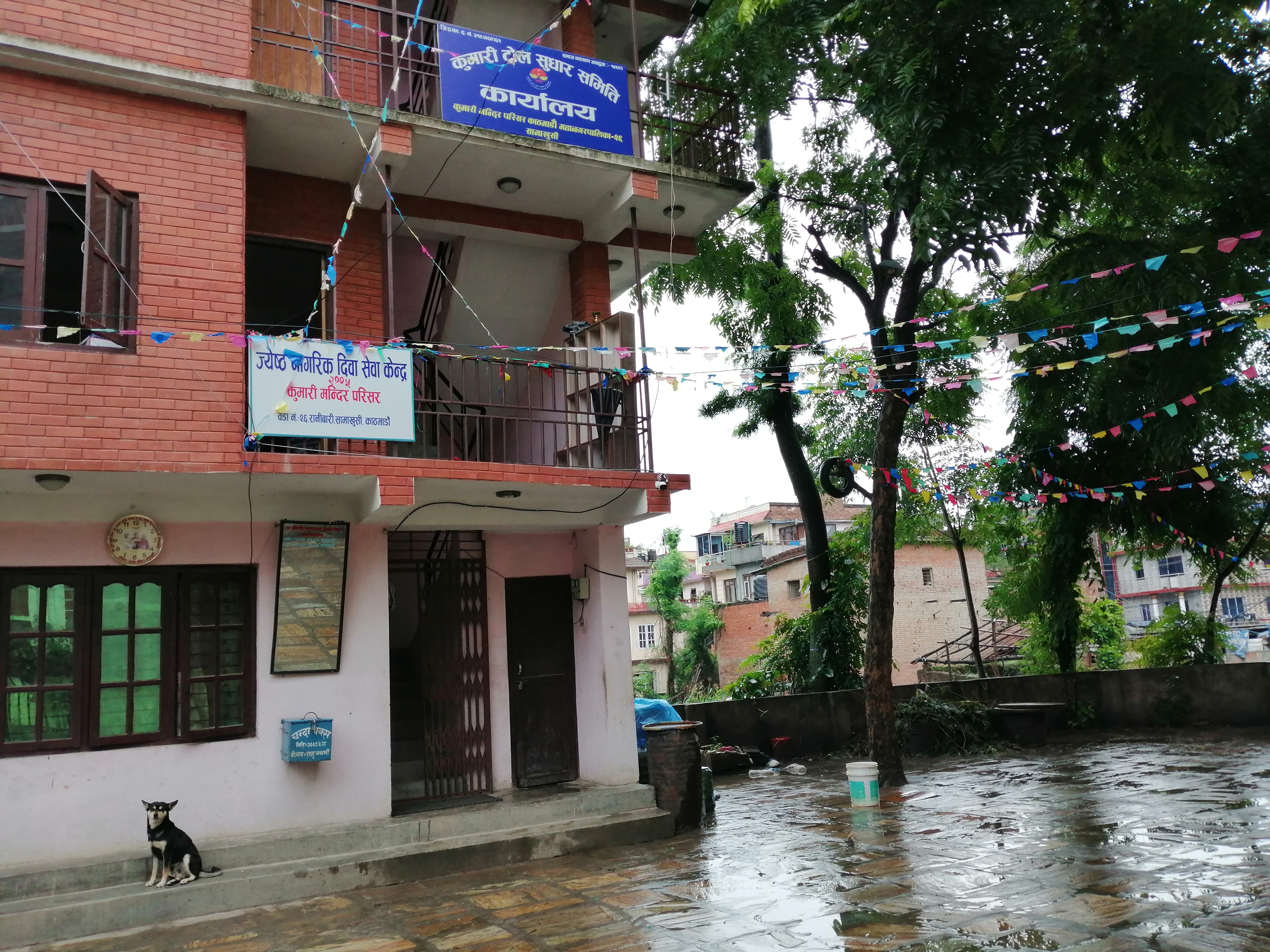
Kumari temple building for devotees
