= Jhor waterfall =

Waterfall in Nepal

Jhor Waterfall
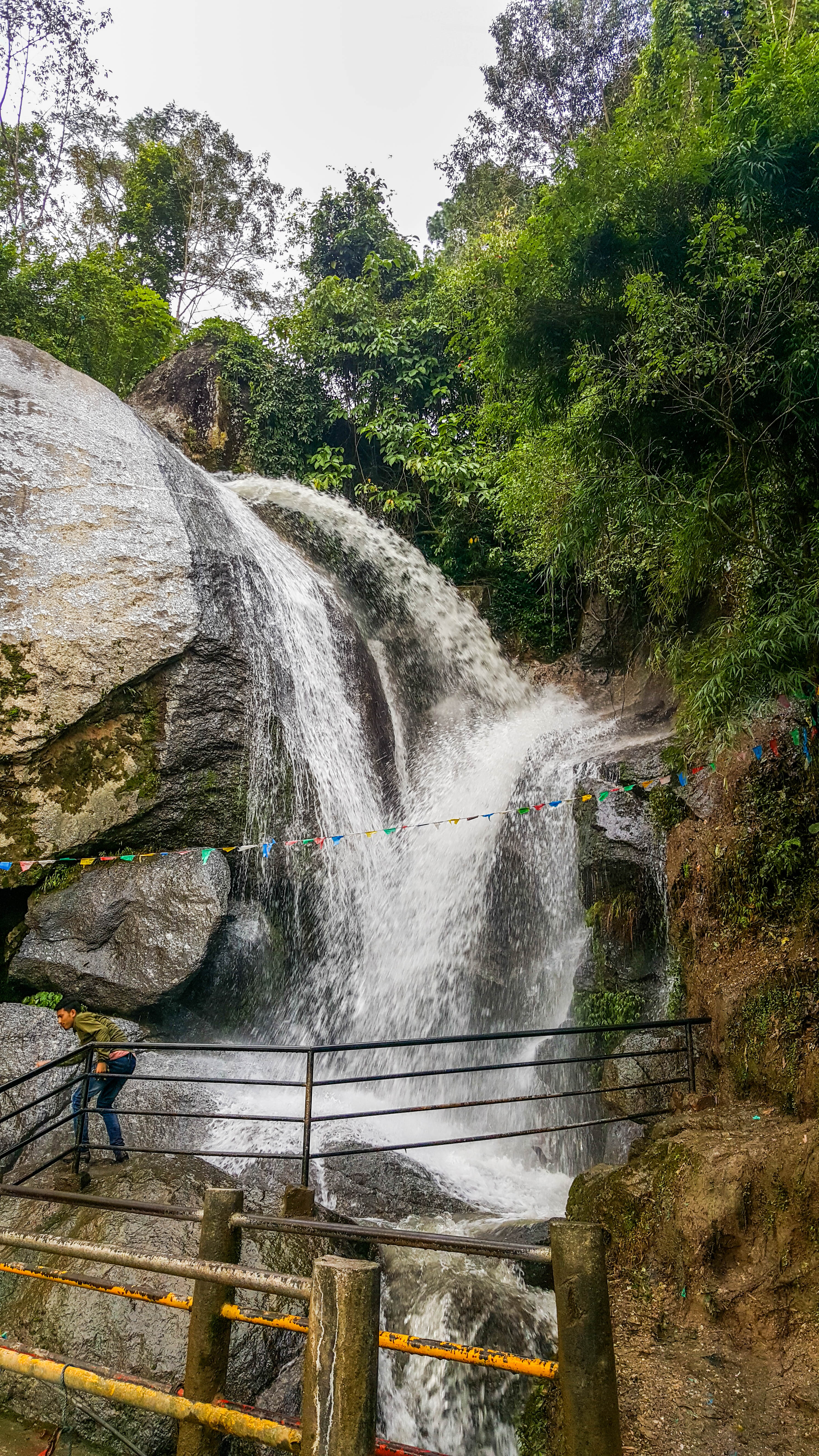

- Location within Nepal
- Location: Kathmandu, Nepal
- Coordinates: 27°48′04″N 85°19′20″E
- Watercourse: Bishnumati river

Jhor waterfall, also known as Gupha Waterfall (Gupha Jharana) is located in the northern hills of Kathmandu near Tokha. The stream from Shivapuri National Park feeds the waterfall. The waterfall is about 11 km from Ring Road (Samakhusi Chowk) from Samakhushi. There is a temple of Shiva near the waterfall which opens on Saturdays and Mondays. There is also a zipline near the waterfall that was constructed to boost the tourism.

The waterfall is close to the city, hence it attracts people from Kathmandu, especially during the summer. The area is underway a tourism development project. A children park has been constructed a couple of hundred meters below the actual waterfall site.

== See also ==
- List of waterfalls
- List of waterfalls of Nepal
