= List of monuments in Tokha, Nepal =

This is a list of monuments in Tokha Municipality within Kathmandu District, Nepal as officially recognized by and available through the website of the Department of Archaeology, Nepal. Tokha is a historically rich area and Hindu temples are the main attraction.

== List of monuments ==
ID	Name	Type	Location	District	Coordinates	Image
NP-KTMTA-01	Statue of Umashwar		Tokha Chandeshwori, Tokha	Kathmandu		Upload Photo Upload Photo
NP-KTMTA-02	Ganesh		Tokha Chandeshwori, Tokha	Kathmandu		Upload Photo Upload Photo
NP-KTMTA-03	Archive in Harilal shrestha's house wall		Tokha Chandeshwori, Tokha	Kathmandu		Upload Photo Upload Photo
NP-KTMTA-04	Brajyogini		Tokha Chandeshwori, Tokha	Kathmandu		Upload Photo Upload Photo
NP-KTMTA-05	Sapanathirth Ganesh		Tokha Chandeshwori, Tokha	Kathmandu		Sapanathirth Ganesh Upload Photo
NP-KTMTA-06	Sankata Ganesh		Tokha Chandeshwori, Tokha	Kathmandu		Sankata Ganesh Upload Photo
NP-KTMTA-07	lah Hiti		Chandeshwori, Tokha	Kathmandu		Upload Photo Upload Photo
NP-KTMTA-08	Nasdya		Chandeshwori, Tokha	Kathmandu		Nasdya Upload Photo
NP-KTMTA-09	Jibit Kumari		Yalagtole	Kathmandu		Jibit Kumari Upload Photo
NP-KTMTA-10	Mahankal		Chandeshwori, Tokha	Kathmandu		Upload Photo Upload Photo
NP-KTMTA-11	Nasapa Statue		Ikulag 2	Kathmandu		Upload Photo Upload Photo
NP-KTMTA-12	Archive		Tokha	Kathmandu		Upload Photo Upload Photo
NP-KTMTA-13	Stone Tap		Tokha	Kathmandu		Stone Tap Upload Photo
NP-KTMTA-14	Shivalinga		Tokha	Kathmandu		Upload Photo Upload Photo
NP-KTMTA-15	Archive		Tokha	Kathmandu		Upload Photo Upload Photo
NP-KTMTA-16	Birabhadra		Tokha	Kathmandu		Upload Photo Upload Photo
NP-KTMTA-17	Mahalaxmi Idol		Tokha	Kathmandu		Upload Photo Upload Photo
NP-KTMTA-18	Devi Idol		Chandeshwori, Tokha	Kathmandu		Upload Photo Upload Photo
NP-KTMTA-19	Bhimsen Idol		Chandeshwori, Tokha	Kathmandu		Bhimsen Idol Upload Photo
NP-KTMTA-20	Kuber Idol		Chandeshwori, Tokha	Kathmandu		Upload Photo Upload Photo
NP-KTMTA-21	Bajrabir Mahankal		Chandeshwori, Tokha	Kathmandu		Upload Photo Upload Photo
NP-KTMTA-22	Hanuman Idol		Chandeshwori, Tokha	Kathmandu		Upload Photo Upload Photo
NP-KTMTA-23	Yasin		Chandeshwori, Tokha	Kathmandu		Yasin Upload Photo
NP-KTMTA-24	Jaldroni		Chandeshwori, Tokha	Kathmandu		Upload Photo Upload Photo
NP-KTMTA-25	Umamaheshwor		Chandeshwori, Tokha	Kathmandu		Umamaheshwor Upload Photo
NP-KTMTA-26	Siddhi Vinayak		Chandeshwori, Tokha	Kathmandu		Upload Photo Upload Photo
NP-KTMTA-27	Bhagawati Dyo chhe		Chandeshwori, Tokha	Kathmandu		Upload Photo Upload Photo
NP-KTMTA-28	Sambhangasan Bishnu		Chandeshwori, Tokha	Kathmandu		Upload Photo Upload Photo
NP-KTMTA-29	Ardhanareshwor		Chandeshwori, Tokha	Kathmandu		Upload Photo Upload Photo
NP-KTMTA-30	Ya Nach		Tokha	Kathmandu		Upload Photo Upload Photo
NP-KTMTA-31	Chaitya		Chandeshwori, Tokha	Kathmandu		Chaitya Upload Photo
NP-KTMTA-32	Chaitya		Chandeshwori, Tokha	Kathmandu		Chaitya Upload Photo
NP-KTMTA-33	Archive		Chandeshwori, Tokha	Kathmandu		Upload Photo Upload Photo
NP-KTMTA-34	Chandeshwori		Chandeshwori, Tokha	Kathmandu		Chandeshwori Upload Photo
NP-KTMTA-35	Jor Bhimsen		Chandeshwori, Tokha	Kathmandu		Jor Bhimsen Upload Photo
NP-KTMTA-36	Chaitya		Chandeshwori 3	Kathmandu		Upload Photo Upload Photo
NP-KTMTA-37	Ganesh Temple		Chandeshwori, Tokha	Kathmandu		Ganesh Temple Upload Photo
NP-KTMTA-38	Muskaneshwor		Tokha	Kathmandu		Upload Photo Upload Photo
NP-KTMTA-39	Stone Tap		Chandeshwori, Tokha	Kathmandu		Upload Photo Upload Photo
NP-KTMTA-40	Sambhangasan Bishnu		Chandeshwori, Tokha	Kathmandu		Upload Photo Upload Photo
NP-KTMTA-41	Ardhanareshwor		Tokha	Kathmandu		Upload Photo Upload Photo
NP-KTMTA-42	Talachhi Narayan		Chandeshwori, Tokha	Kathmandu		Upload Photo Upload Photo
NP-KTMTA-43	Rishi Agastya		Chandeshwori, Tokha	Kathmandu		Upload Photo Upload Photo
NP-KTMTA-44	Bishnu		Chandeshwori, Tokha	Kathmandu		Upload Photo Upload Photo
NP-KTMTA-45	Four head shivalinga		Chandeshwori, Tokha	Kathmandu		Four head shivalinga Upload Photo
NP-KTMTA-46	samabhangasan bishnu		Chandeshwori, Tokha	Kathmandu		Upload Photo Upload Photo
NP-KTMTA-47	Stone Tap		Chandeshwori, Tokha	Kathmandu		Upload Photo Upload Photo
NP-KTMTA-48	Bhimsen Idol		Chandeshwori 3	Kathmandu		Upload Photo Upload Photo
NP-KTMTA-49	Hanuman Idol		Chandeshwori, Tokha	Kathmandu		Hanuman Idol Upload Photo
NP-KTMTA-50	Shivaparbati		Chandeshwori, Tokha	Kathmandu		Upload Photo Upload Photo
NP-KTMTA-51	Bhairav		Chandeshwori, Tokha	Kathmandu		Upload Photo Upload Photo
NP-KTMTA-52	Stone Dakshyaprajapati		Chandeshwori, Tokha	Kathmandu		Upload Photo Upload Photo
NP-KTMTA-53	Chaturbyuha Bishnu		Chandeshwori, Tokha	Kathmandu		Upload Photo Upload Photo
NP-KTMTA-54	Sadakshyari awalokiteswhor		Chandeshwori, Tokha	Kathmandu		Upload Photo Upload Photo
NP-KTMTA-55	Talachhi Narayan		Chandeshwori, Tokha	Kathmandu		Upload Photo Upload Photo
NP-KTMTA-56	Tajaju Tokha		Chandeshwori, Tokha	Kathmandu		Upload Photo Upload Photo
NP-KTMTA-57	Masankali Pith		Chandeshwori, Tokha	Kathmandu		Upload Photo Upload Photo
NP-KTMTA-58	Manjushree		Chandeshwori, Tokha	Kathmandu		Upload Photo Upload Photo
NP-KTMTA-59	Archive inside Masankali		Chandeshwori, Tokha	Kathmandu		Upload Photo Upload Photo
NP-KTMTA-60	Jalpadevi		Gongabu, Tokha	Kathmandu		Upload Photo Upload Photo
NP-KTMTA-61	Mahadevsthan		Gongabu, Tokha	Kathmandu		Upload Photo Upload Photo

== See also ==
- List of monuments in Kathmandu District
- List of monuments in Nepal
