= Todke waterfall =

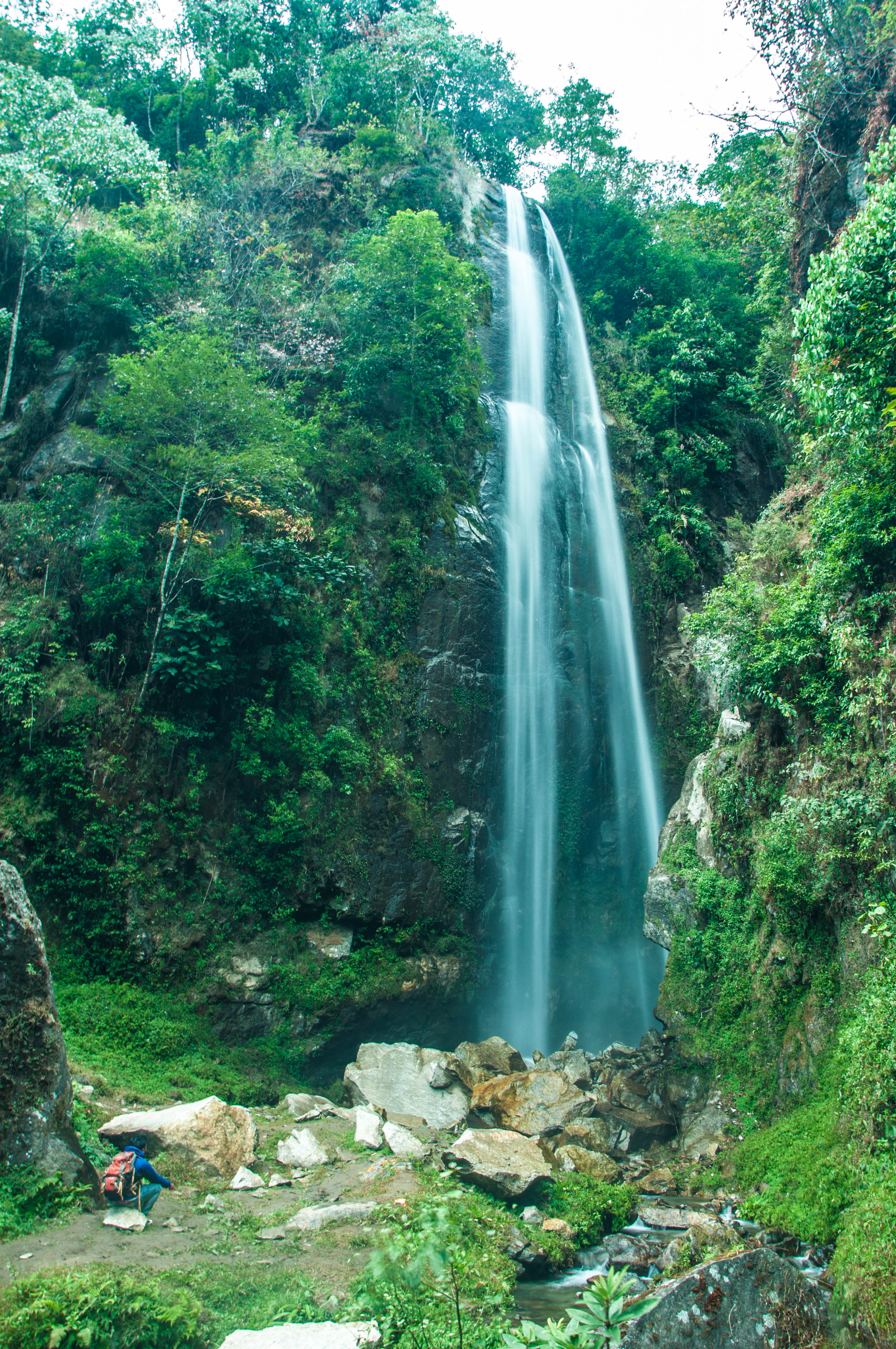

- Location within Nepal
- Location: Ilam district, Nepal
- Coordinates: 27°02′39″N 87°56′35″E
- Elevation: 1,600 m (5,200 ft)
- Total height: 85 m (279 ft)
- Watercourse: Mai River

Todke waterfall (Nepali: टोड्के झरना) is located in the hills of Maimajhuwa near Mai Pokhari in Ilam district. The fall feeds the Mai River. It has a height of 85 m.

The fall is accessible by trekking from the district headquarter. The local government is initiating to increase tourism in the area by developing roads and lodging facilities near the waterfall.

== Gallery ==
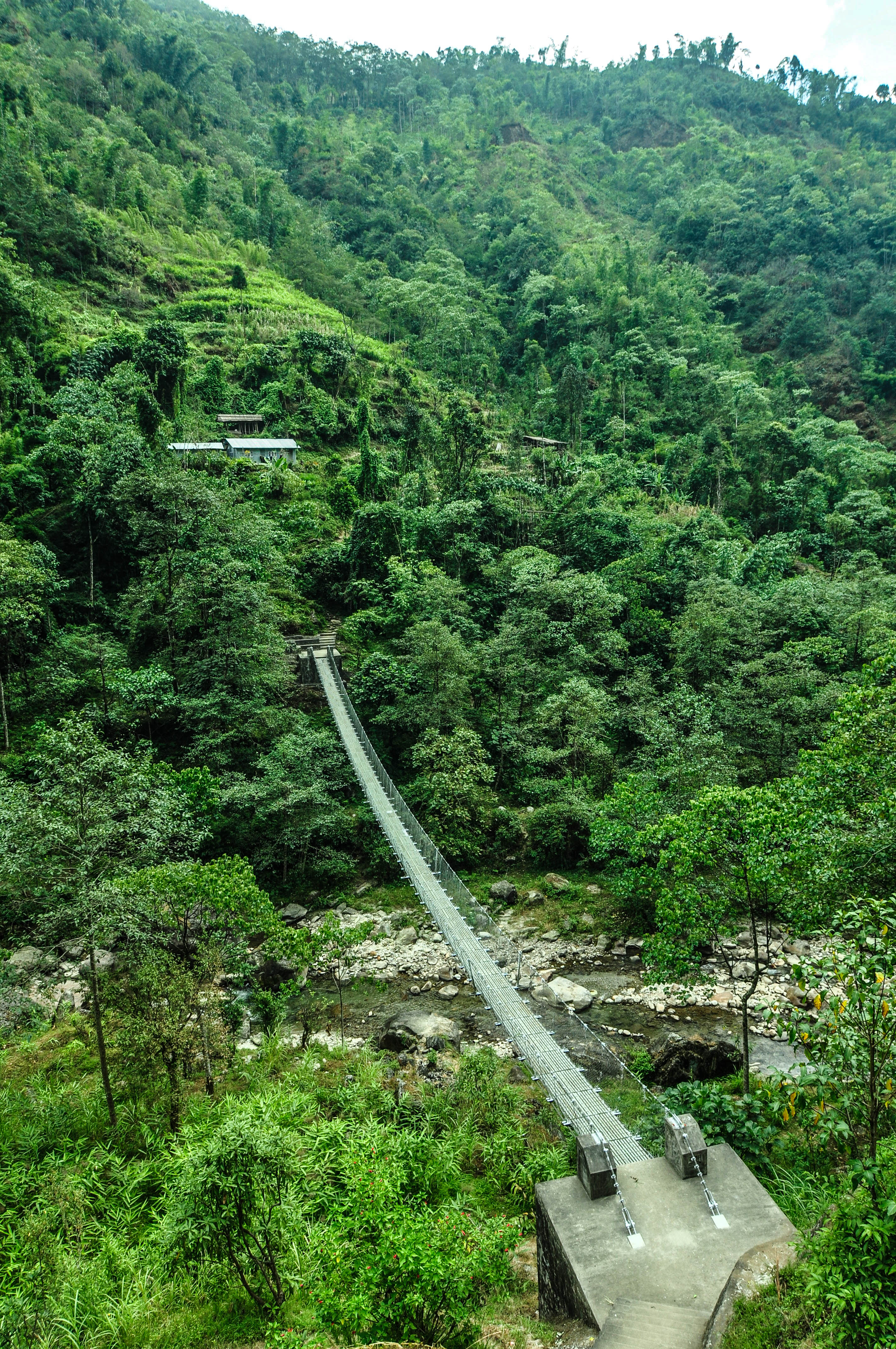

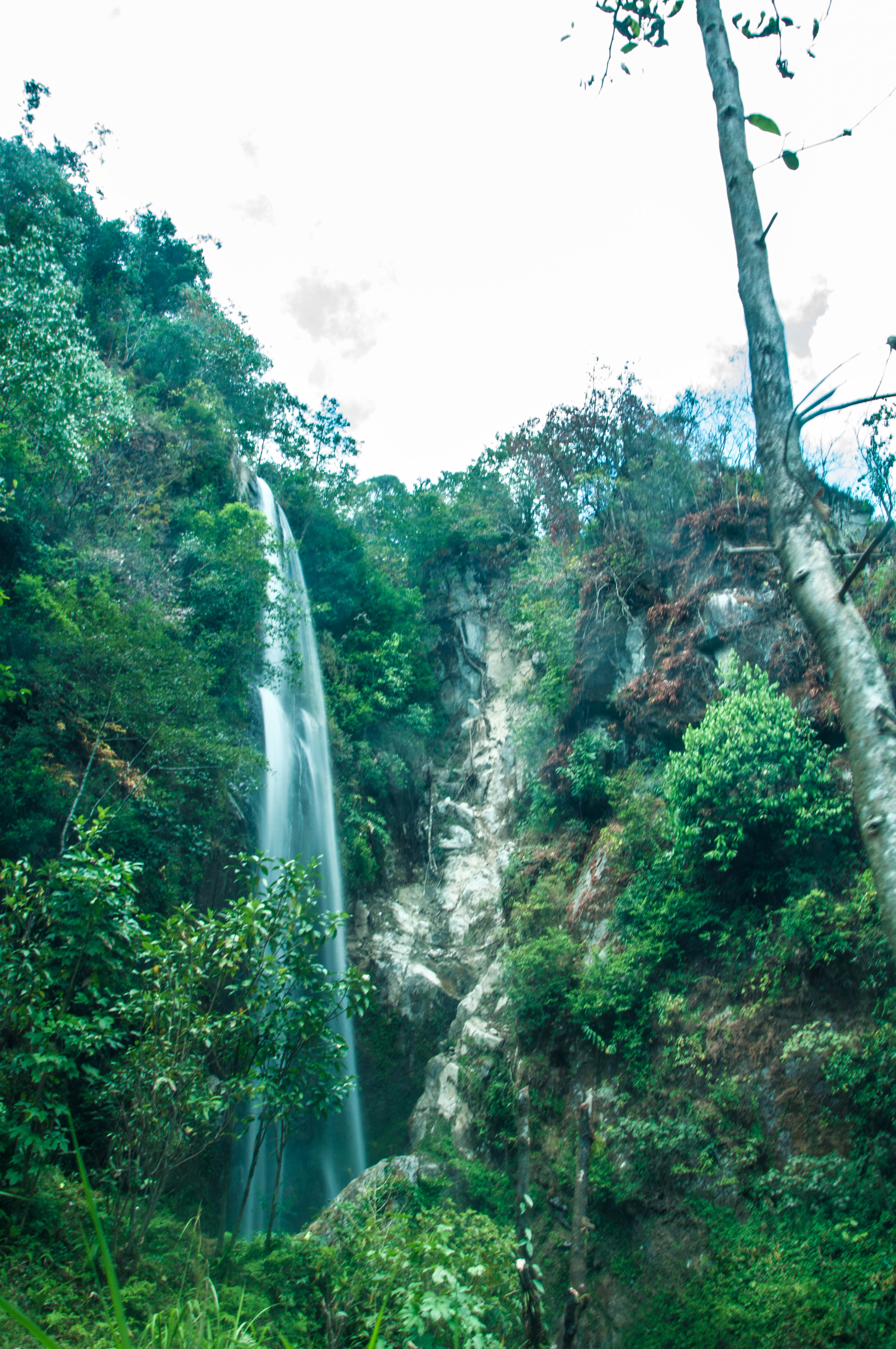

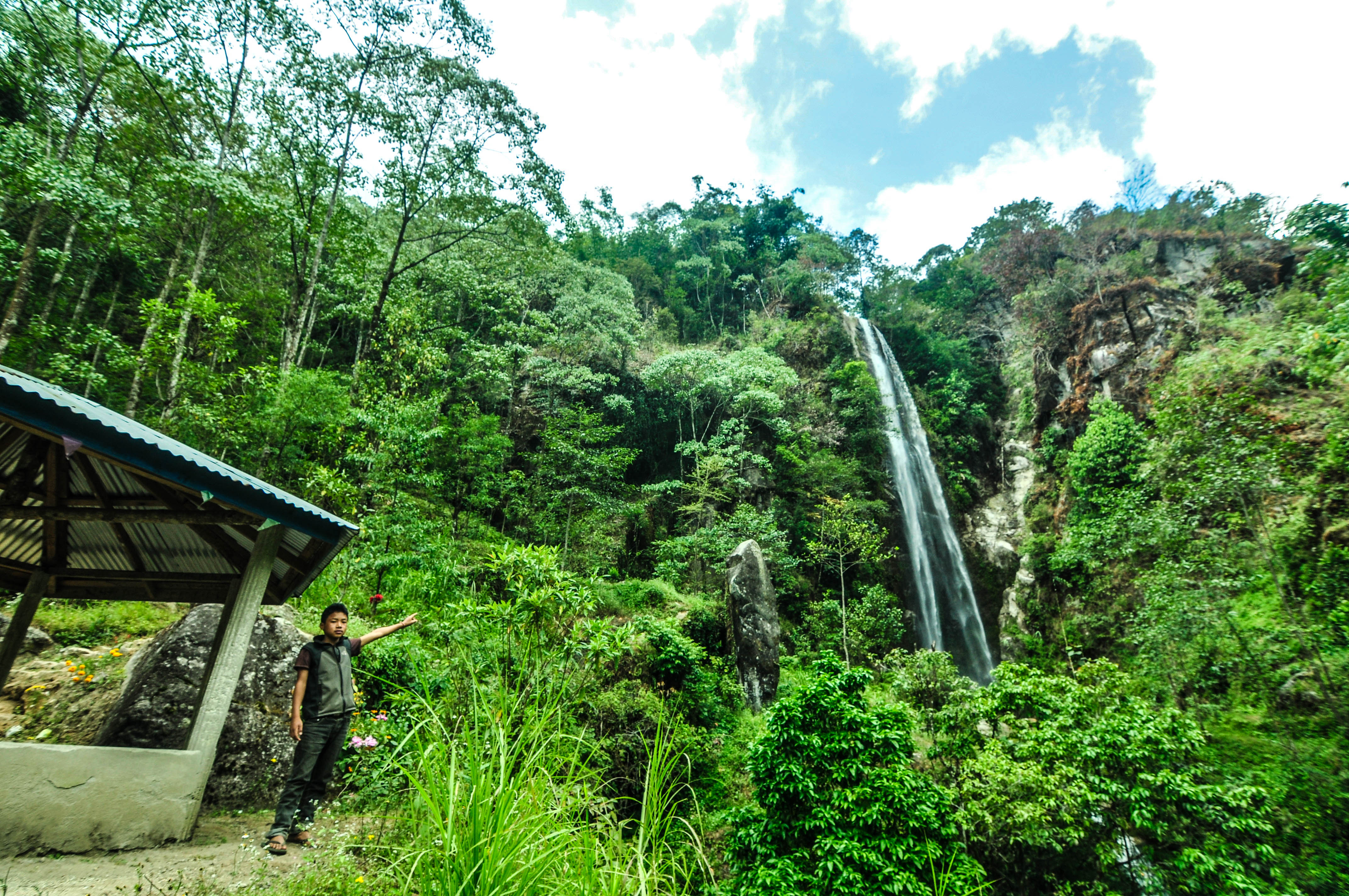

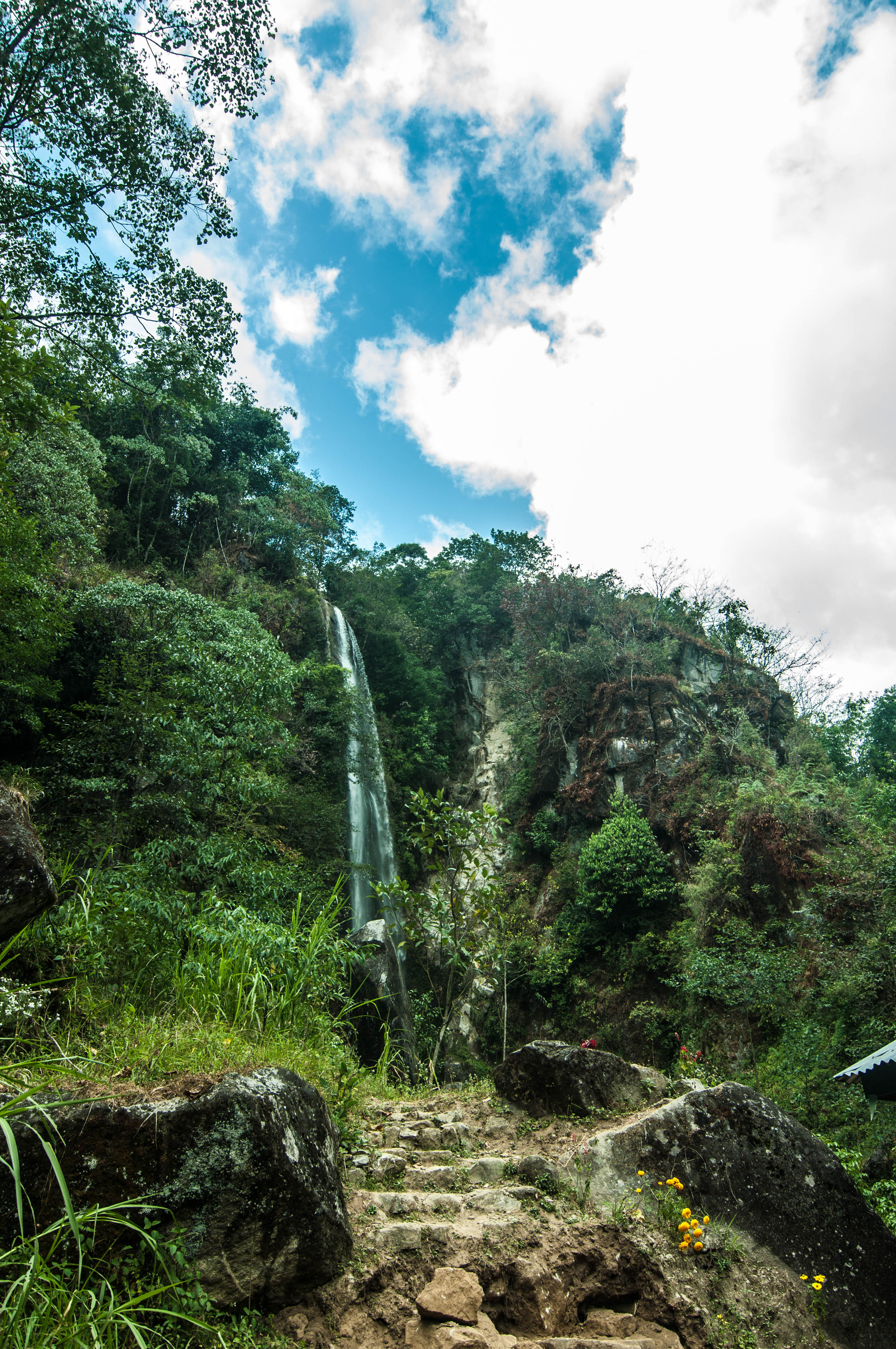

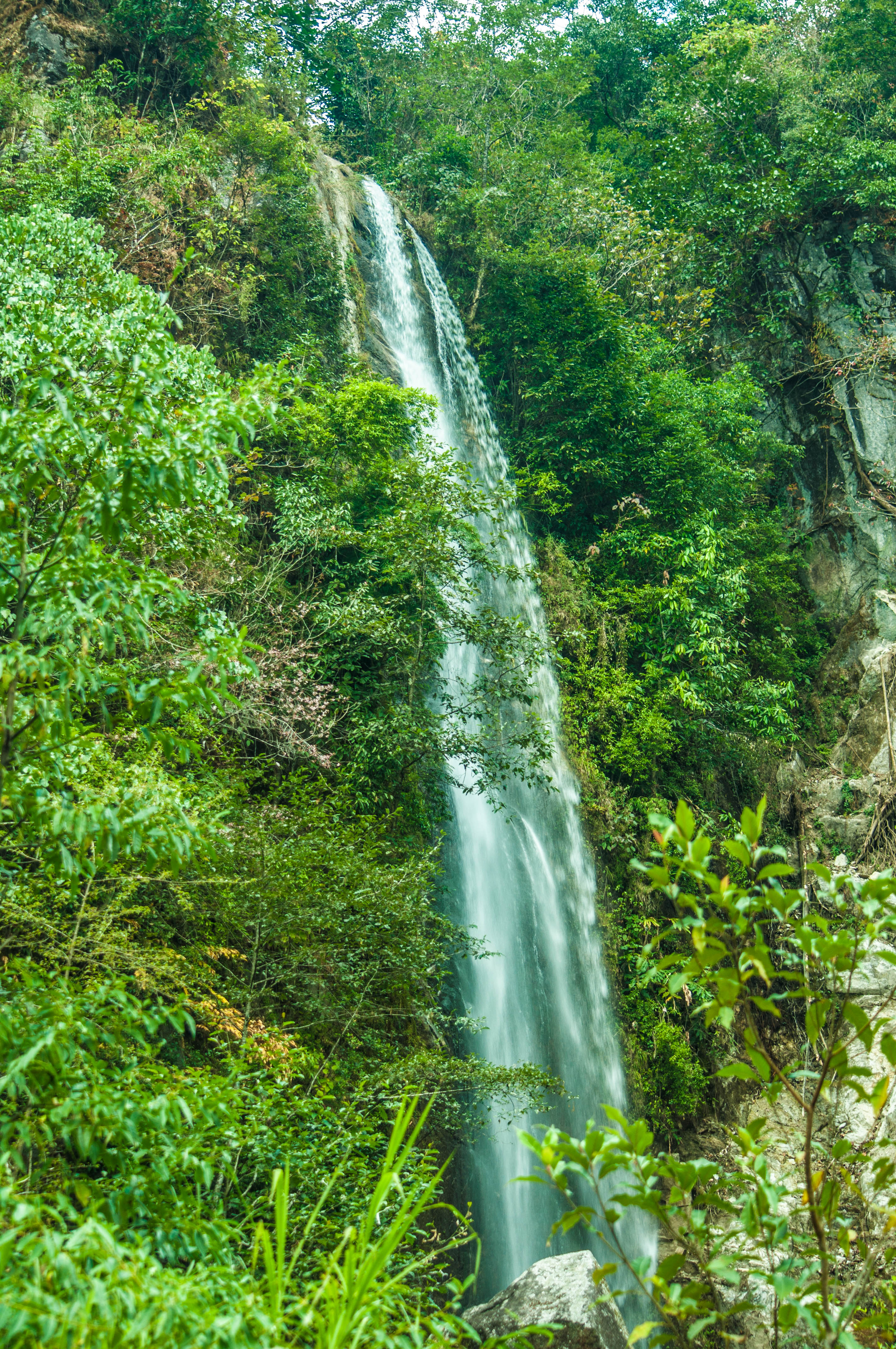

== See also ==
- List of waterfalls
- List of waterfalls of Nepal

Media related to Todke waterfall at Wikimedia Commons
