= List of waterfalls in Nepal =

This is a list of waterfalls in Nepal. They are also called Jharana(Nepali-झरना) in local language.

== List ==
Name	Location	Fall height (m)	Photo	References
Davis Falls (Nepali: पाताले छाँगो)	Pokhara, Kaski District	152.4m	width	
Rupse Falls (Nepali: रूप्से झरना)	Myagdi District	300 m	width	
Tindhare Waterfall	Kavrepalanchok District	300 m	width	
Hyatung Falls	Terhathum District	365 m		
Namaste Falls (Nepali: नमस्ते झरना)	Dhankuta district	80 m	width	
Pachal waterfall (Nepali: पचाल झरना)	Kalikot District	381 m		,
Pokali waterfall	Okhaldhunga district	130 m	width	
Narchyang waterfall	Myagdi district	500		
Jhor waterfall	Kathmandu	30 m	width	
Simba waterfall: It is also called as Manikhel waterfall . In tamang language "Simba" refers to " the water is very cold.”	Lalitpur	300 m	Manikhel Waterfall- the simbafall	
Todke waterfall	Ilam district	85 m	width	
Purandhara waterfall	Dang district	45 m	width	
Lamo waterfall (Nepali: लामो झरना), also known as Jalbire Jharana	Chitwan district	60 m		
Bhorle waterfall (Nepali: भोर्ले झरना)	Dolakha District	100 m	width	
Baitadi waterfall			width	
Manikhel waterfall			width	
Rupaligad waterfall, also called Saila Waterfall.	Dadeldhura district	300 m		
Aina waterfall, also called Mirror waterfall	Anbu Khaireni, Tanahun District	60 m		
Phungphunge waterfall	Taplejung district	300 m		
Vhel Chhada Falls.(भेल छडा झरना) , also spelled as Bhelchheda Waterfall .	Toleni, Khaptad National Park, Doti district	300 m		
Sundarijal Waterfall	Sundarijal Village, Kathmandu district	75 m	Sundarijal Waterfall	
Chyachhara Waterfall: Chyachhara is lovely waterfall which is situated on the way to Mansarobar Kailash at the height of 2350m.	Chyaduk, Kahgalgaun, Namkha Rural Municipality, Humla district	200 m		
Octopus Waterfall, falls like the legs of an Octopus.	On the world famous Annapurna Circuit, Marsyandi Rural Municipality, Lamjung District	100 m		
Sunchhari WaterFall (Gold Waterfall)	Siuri, Sunchhahari Rural Municipality, Rolpa District	300 m		
Tilkhuwa Waterfall, also known as Chhahara Waterfall	Malarani Rural Municipality, Arghakhanchi District	150 m		
Mailung Waterfall(Bhange Waterfall)	Dandagaun, Uttargaya Rural Municipality, Rasuwa District	150 m		
Litheli Waterfall: It is on the route to the Api Base Camp in Farwest Nepal.	Darchula District	150 m		
Mohini waterfall (Nepali: मोहिनी झरना)	Makawanpur District	92 m		
Tarengto Waterfall	Okhaldhunga District	300m		
Barabise Waterfall	Sindhupalchowk District	200m		

== See also ==
- List of waterfalls
