= Narchyang =

Narchyang नारच्याङ्ग
- Village
- Location of Narchyang, Nepal
- Coordinates: 28.58°N 83.74°E
- Country: Nepal
- Province: Gandaki Province
- District: Myagdi
- Rural Municipality: Annapurna Rural Municipality ward no: 4 Narchayng

Government
  - ward 4 president: Lok Bahadur Phagami
- Elevation: 1,400 m (4,600 ft)

Population (1991)
  - Total: 1,762 (1,991)
- Time zone: UTC+5:45 (NPT)
- Postal code: 33200
- Area code: 069

Narchyang (Nepali: Narchyang) is a Pun village situated in Annapurna Rural Municipality, Nepal, in the north part of the Myagdi district. It is surrounded by similar villages such as: Patar, Gadpar, Basgot, Gharap,Narchyang besi gau, Narchayng Lekhagau, ThadeSwara and Kopchepani.

It is connected to the district headquarters in Beni Bazar, approximately 100 km NW from Pokhara, by a rough agricultural road. The village consists of rustic houses with stone walls and roofs.

== Tourist Attraction ==
- Narchyang waterfall
- Narchyang To Khopra Trekking Trail(Hiking Area)
- Annapurna North Base Camp Trekking Trail (Maurice Herzog Trail)
- Hydro Power Project

== Demographics ==
The population of around 1500 consists mainly of the Magar ethnic group. The major group is Pun Magars or Pun and is divided into many sub clan ( Pun, Garbuja Pun, Purja Pun, Chochangi Pun, Tilija Pun, Paija Pun, Phagami Pun, Buduja Pun, Dut Pun, Ramjali Pun), and the second is Pariyar (Damaai) (Swingman & folk musicians) Bishwokarma (Kami), (Ironsmiths)is. Magar is present. The village covers from sea level approx 1300-2200 masl. Others are Gurung.

== Education ==
Narchyang was initiated to establish a school. It was the center of the education system gathering students from 5 villages.

- Shree Prabha Secondary School,
- Shree Kranti Basic School,
- Shree Nilgiri Basic School,
- Dhaulagiri basic School,
- Narchyang Basic School.

== Economy ==
The main occupation is agriculture. Some worked in the Nepalese, Indian Army, and British armies. Young adults emigrate for work, especially to Gulf Countries, along with Japan, Korea, and the United States. income has become the major economic support. Few people have an opportunity to work in government as a school teachers, and few people are entrepreneurs, such as production and orange orchards.

== Geography ==
The village lies below high mountain peaks: Mount Dhaulagiri (8,091 m), Nilgiri (7,061 m), and Annapurna I (8,091 m), Annapurna South (7,219 m), and Baraha Shikhar (7,654 m). The village is rich in its specific culture and traditions. This is the only village in the region with Mongolian people inhabited.

It is rich in flora and fauna.
