= Narchyang waterfall =

Waterfall in Myagdi district, Nepal

Narchyang Waterfall
- Location within Nepal
- Location: Narchyang, Nepal
- Coordinates: 28°30′40″N 83°39′54″E
- Type: run of the river
- Total height: 500 m (1,600 ft)
- Total width: 12 m (39 ft)
- Watercourse: Khibang khola

Narchyang waterfall (Nepali:नारच्याङ्ग झरना) lies along the Annapurna trekking trail, in Annapurna Rural Municipality in Myagdi district.

The fall lies at an elevation of 1,400 metres (4,600 ft). The fall height is about 300 metres (980 ft). A temple of Bhumethan is located near the waterfall where pilgrimage pays visit in the months of Jestha and Asar.

== See also ==
- List of waterfalls
- List of waterfalls of Nepal
