= Simba waterfall =

Waterfall in Nepal

Simba Waterfall
- Location within Nepal
- Location: Lalitpur, Nepal
- Coordinates: 27°34′01″N 85°18′11″E
- Watercourse: Bagmati river

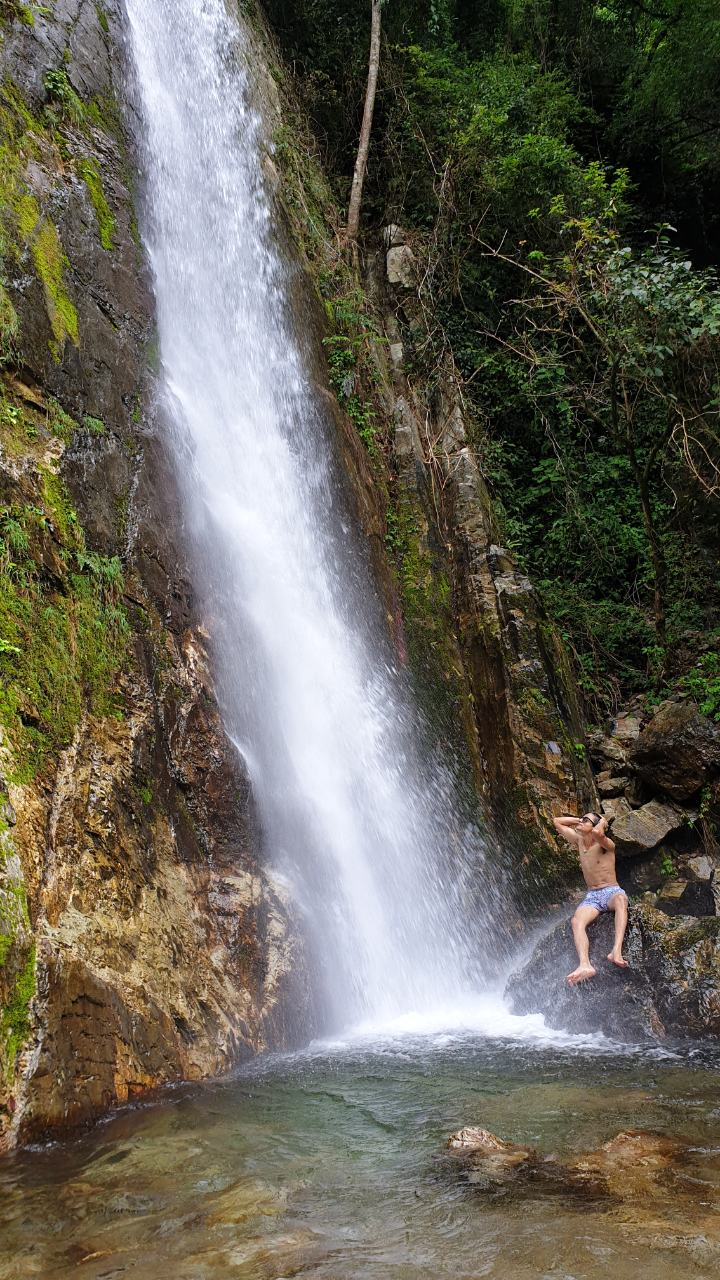
Manikhel Waterfall- the simbafall

Simba waterfall is located in Mahankal Rural Municipality, Lalitpur about 50 km from Kathmandu between Rigin Danda and Manikhel Khawa. The fall lies at an altitude of 2000 m, and it has five cascades.It is 300 meter tall. ‘Simba’ means cold in Tamang language.

There is also a temple of Saraswati on the way to Lele from the fall.

== See also ==
- List of waterfalls
- List of waterfalls of Nepal
