= Gonggabu =

Gongabu गोङ्गबु
- Village of Tokha Municipality
- Location in Nepal
- Coordinates: 27.75°N 85.32°E
- Country: Nepal
- Province: Bagmati Province
- District: Kathmandu District

Population (2011)
  - Total: 54,410
- Time zone: UTC+5:45 (Nepal Time)

Gongabu is a village and former Village Development Committee that is now part of Tokha Municipality in Kathmandu District in Bagmati Province of central Nepal. At the time of the 2011 Nepal census it had a population of 54,410 and had 14,456 households in it in an area just 270 hectares in size.

== Toponymy ==
=== Linguistic origin ===
- Linguistic family: Sino-Tibetan
- Language: Newari

=== Etymology ===
“Gongga/Gongga” likely comes from a Tibeto-Burman or Newar origin name. “Bu” may be interpreted as “village, settlement, or hamlet.” Therefore, Gonggabu could mean “the settlement of the Gongga group” or “the village associated with Gongga.”

Gongga / Gong is possibly a clan, community, or descriptive term of Tibeto-Burman origin. Comparable with Tibetan Gongkar (gong-dkar) meaning “white stupa” or clan names with Gong. Bu (बु) means “village, place, settlement” in several Newar/Tibeto-Burman dialects; in Nepali also used in some toponyms as “hamlet.” The toponym Gonggabu thus likely reflects a Tibeto-Burman/Newar origin, indicating “village of Gongga (clan/place).”
