= Rupse Falls =

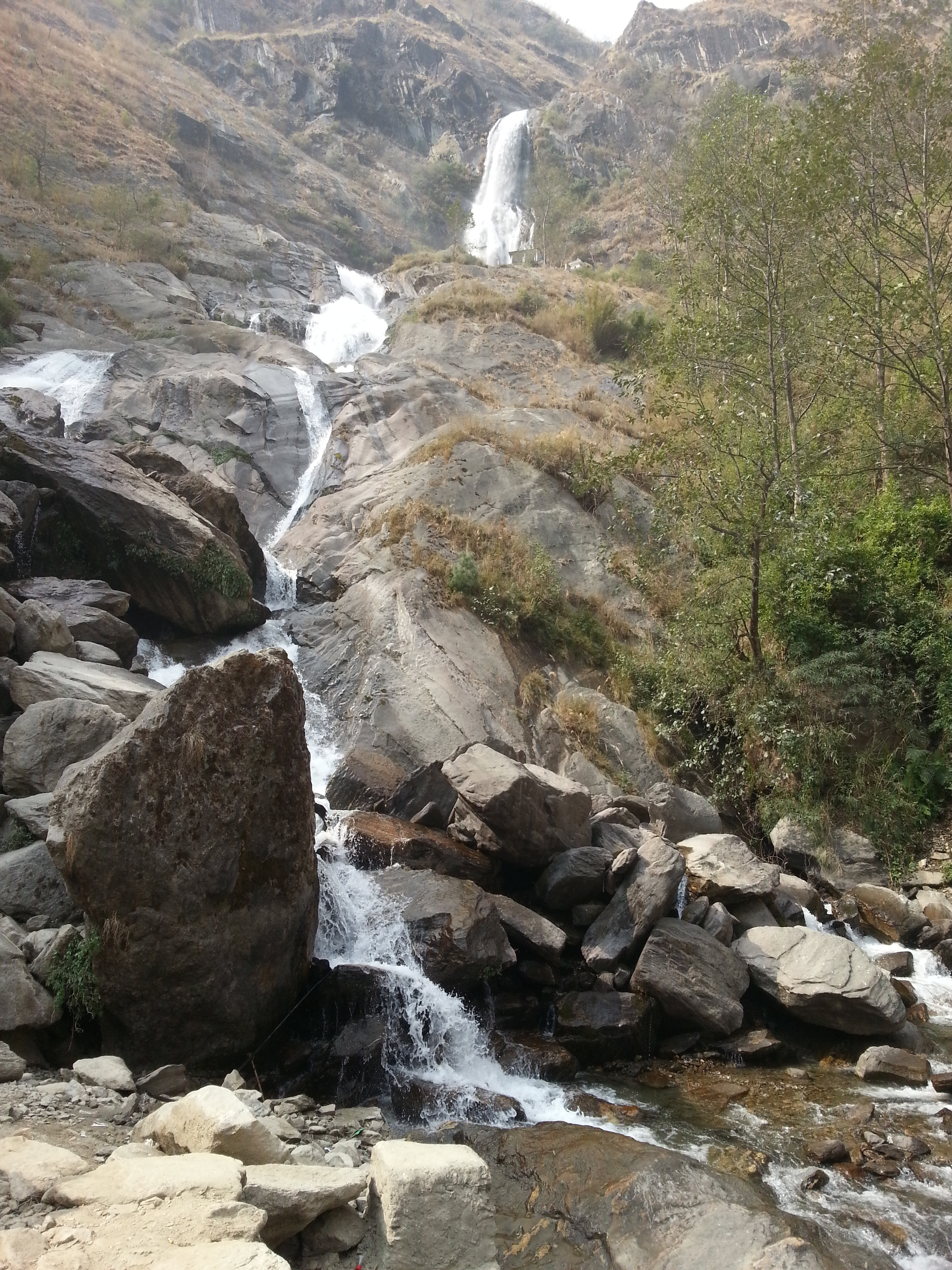
- A view of Rupse Falls.

- Location within Nepal
- Location: Dana VDC of Myagdi District, Nepal
- Coordinates: 28°33′20″N 83°38′10″E
- Total height: 300 metres (980 ft)
- Watercourse: Kali Gandaki River

Rupse Falls (Nepali: रूप्से झरना) is a waterfall in central Nepal. It is located in Dana VDC of Myagdi District in Dhawalagiri Zone of western Nepal. It is 300 meters (984 feet) tall. The Rupse falls is a popular tourist destination.

== Geography ==
Rupse is located in Beni-Jomsom Highway route. It is approximately 110 km from Pokhara and approximately 40.8 km from Jomsom. Kali Gandaki Gorge, the deepest gorge in the world, and the Kali Gandaki river are nearby.

== Waterfalls ==
The height of Rupse Falls is more than 300 meters.

== Tourism ==
Annually roughly 1,500,000 tourist visit this site.

== Gallery ==
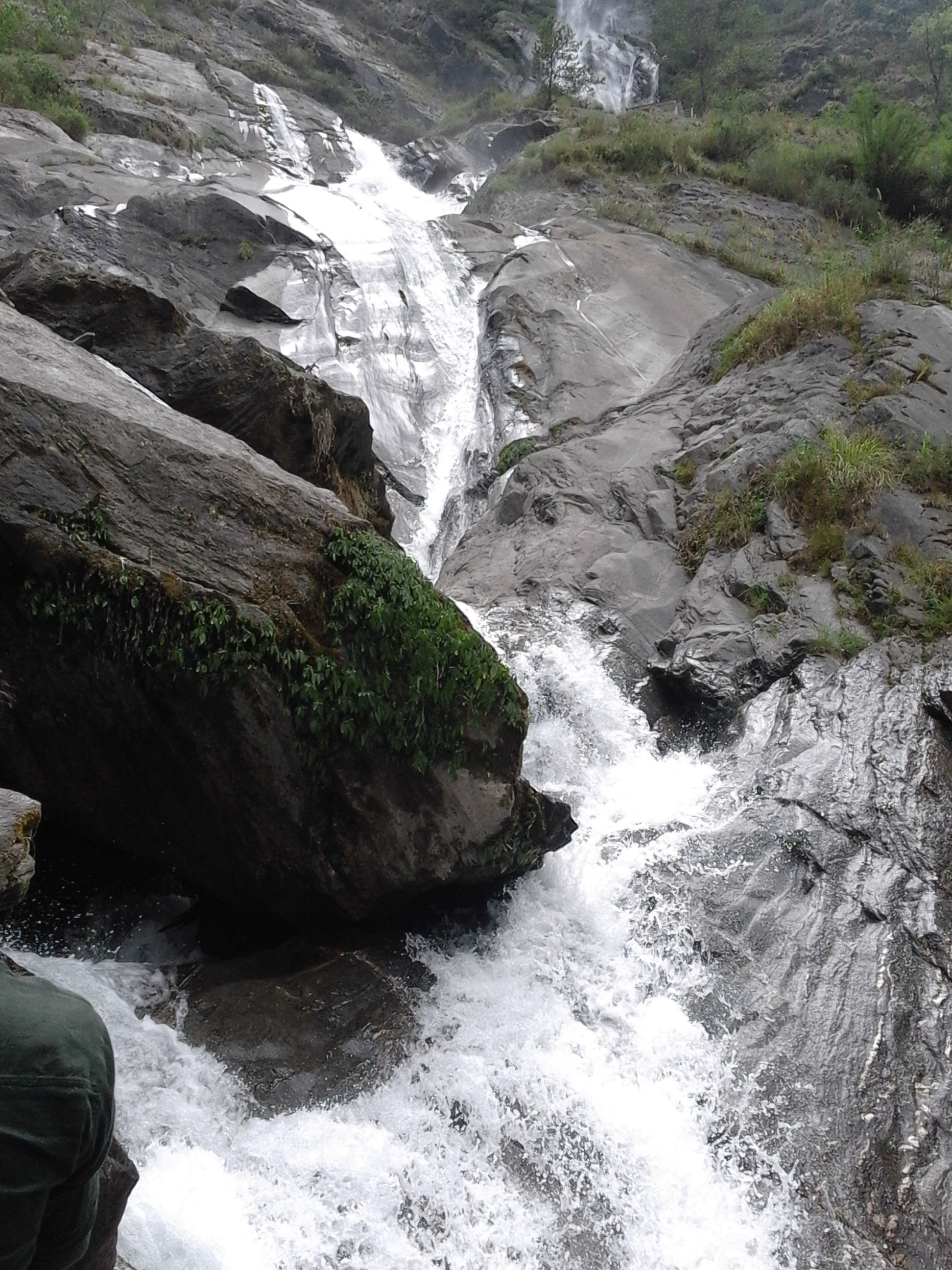
Rupse Falls

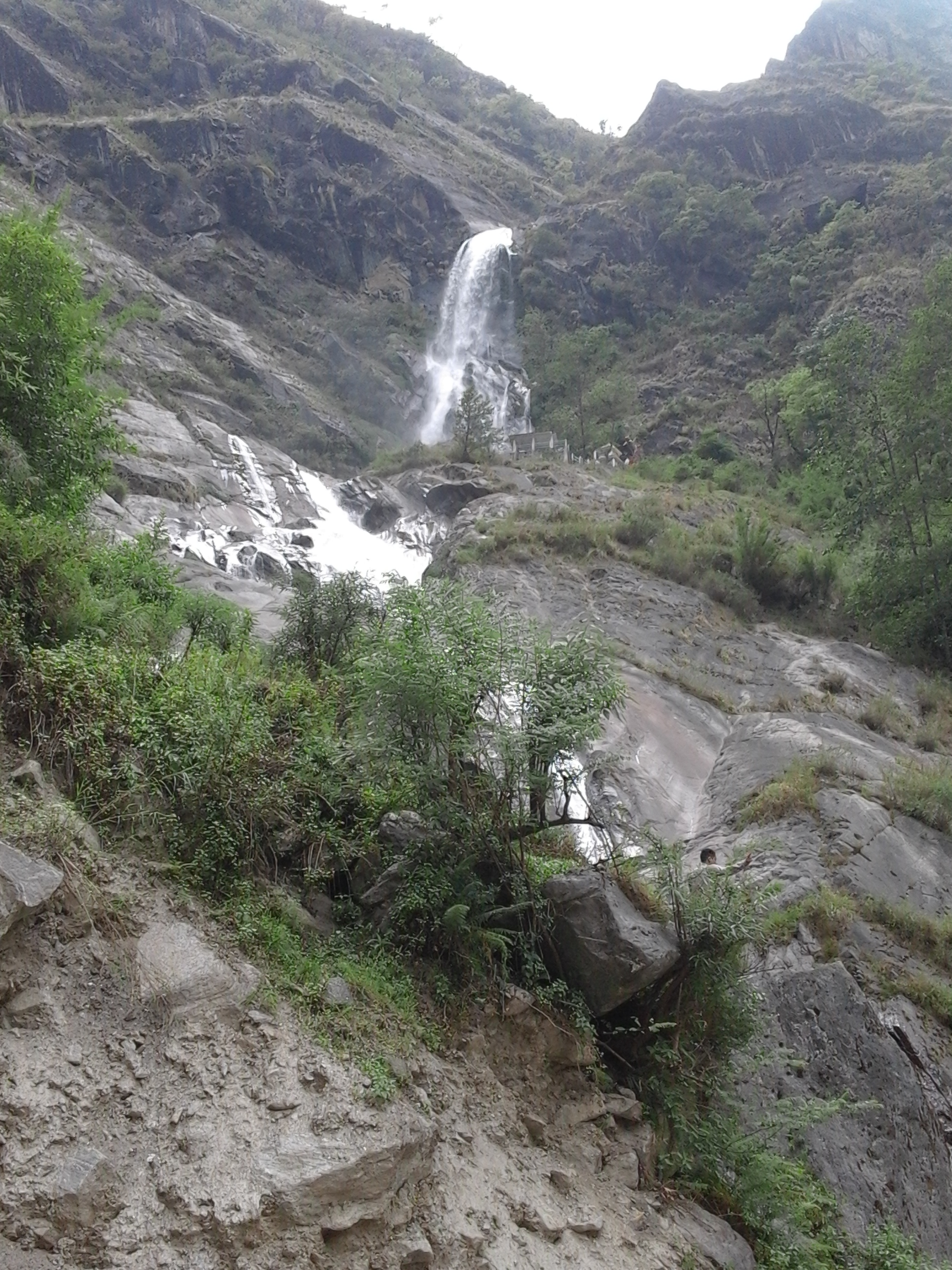
Rupse Falls

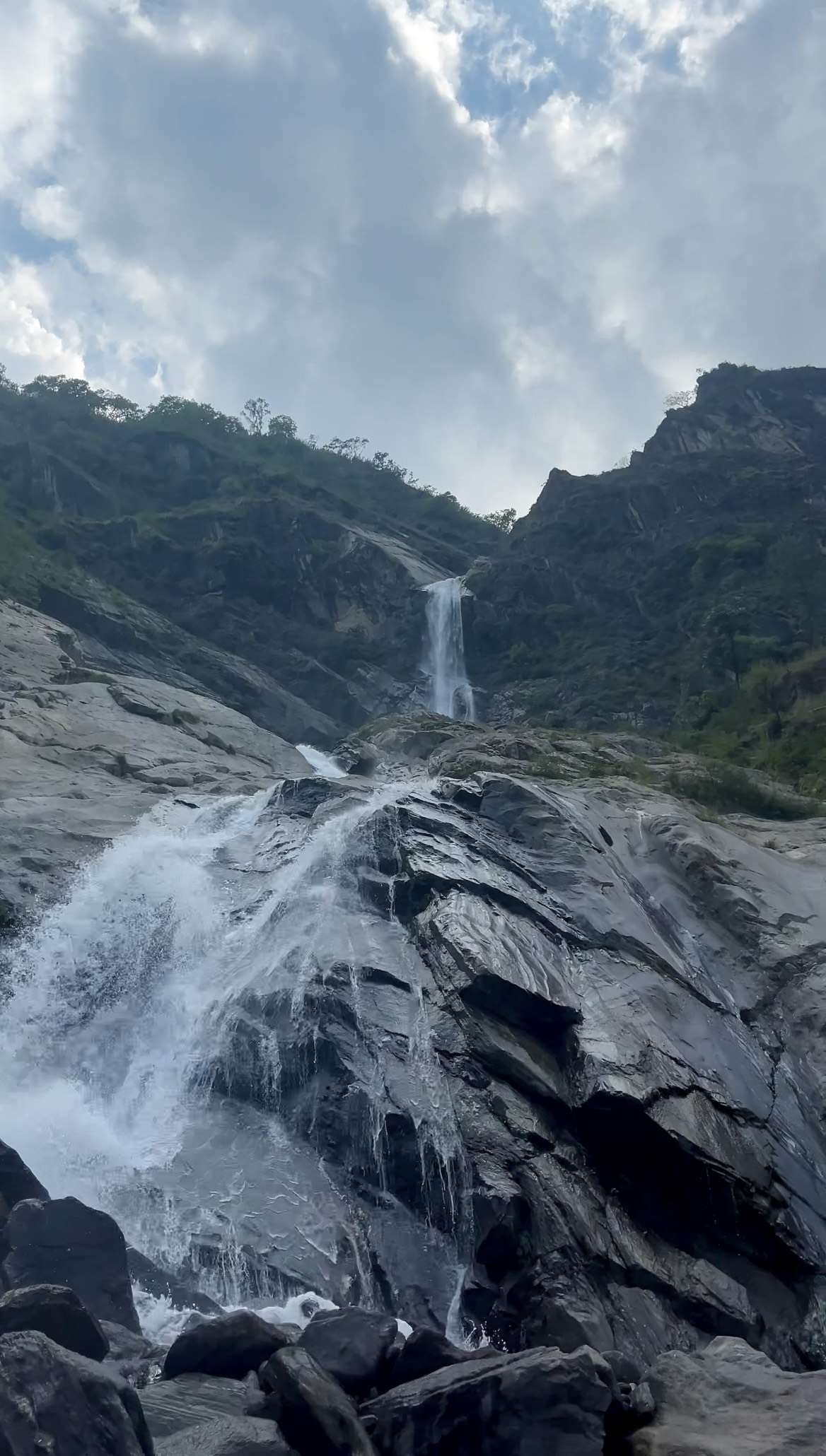
Rupse Falls in 2024

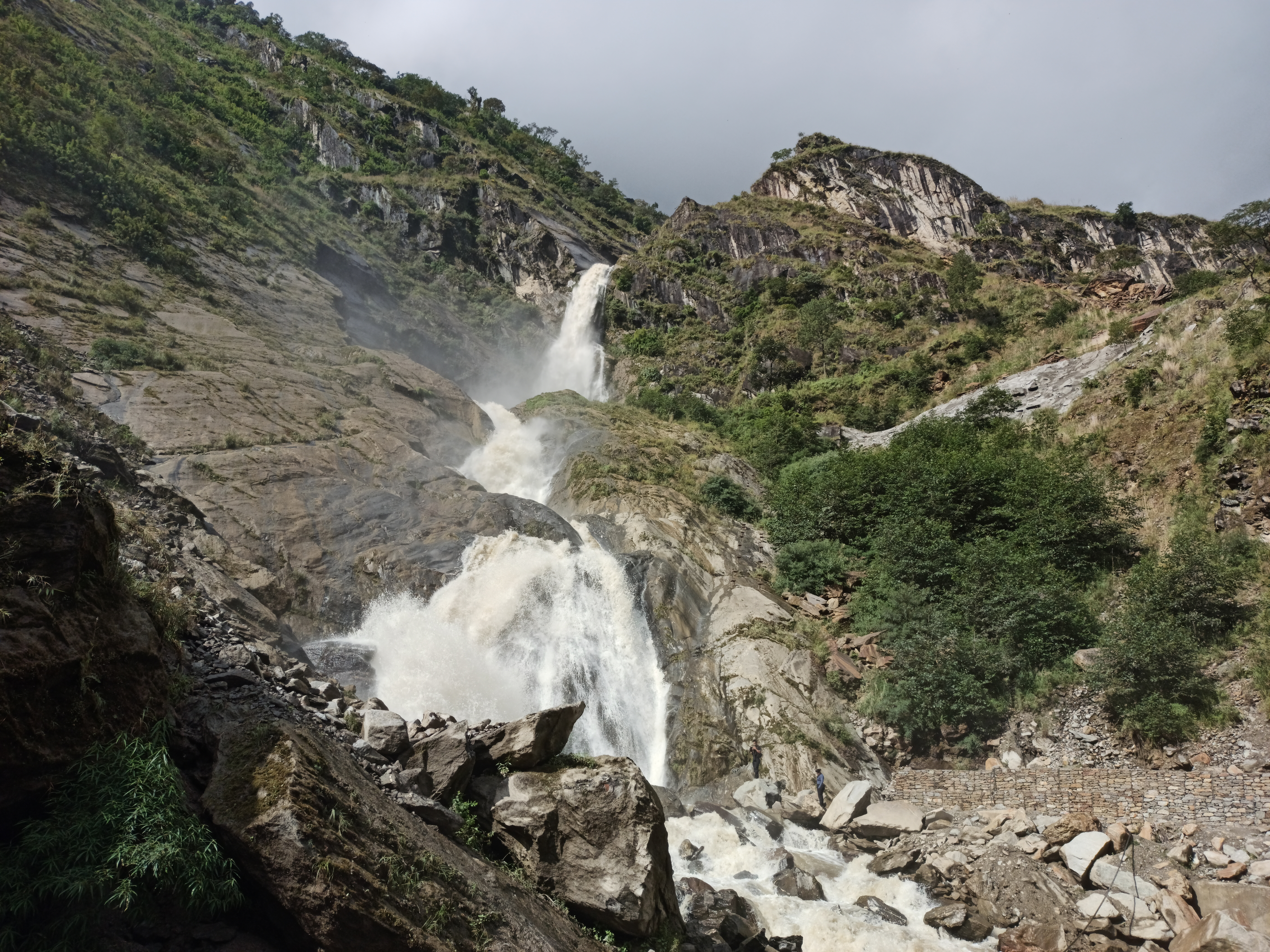
Rupse Falls in 2025

== See also ==
- List of waterfalls
- List of waterfalls of Nepal
