= Pokali waterfall =

Waterfall in Nepal

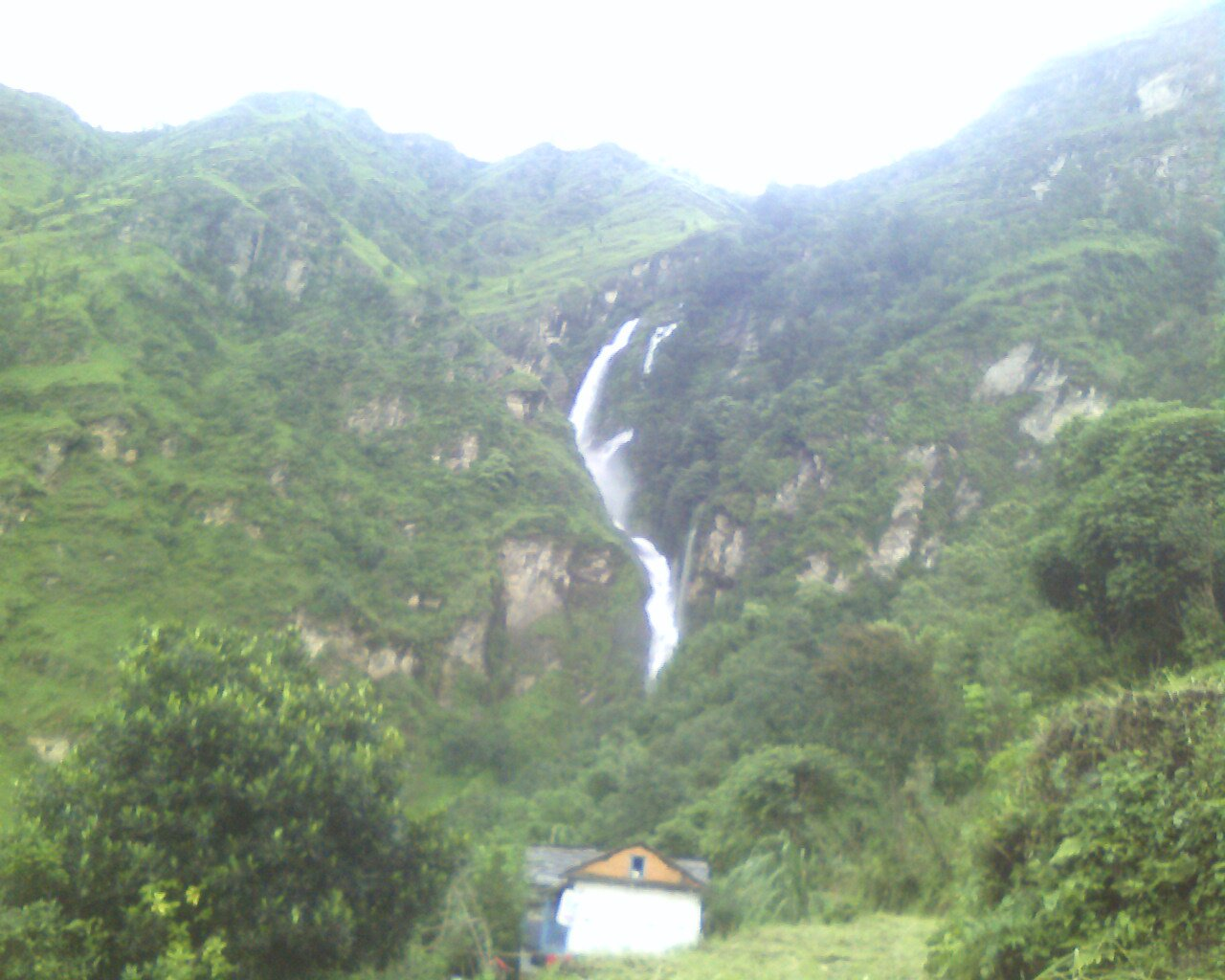

- Location within Nepal
- Location: Nepal
- Coordinates: 27°25′28″N 86°16′17″E
- Total height: 130 m (430 ft)
- Watercourse: Likhu Khola

Pokali waterfall is located in Okhaldhunga district of Nepal draining to the Likhu river. With a fall height of 130 m, it is considered second tallest fall of Nepal.

There is a Madhav temple near the waterfall which is visited by the hindus of surrounding districts. An annual festival is conducted near the waterfall to promote tourism as it is considered as one of the potential site for touristic activities.

== See also ==
- List of waterfalls
- List of waterfalls of Nepal
