= Tokha Saraswati =

Tokha Saraswati टोखा सरस्वती
- Village of Tokha Municipality
- Location in Nepal
- Coordinates: 27.76°N 85.33°E
- Country: Nepal
- Province: No. 3
- District: Kathmandu District

Population (2011)
  - Total: 5,152
- Time zone: UTC+5:45 (Nepal Time)
- Postal code: 44608
- Area code: 01

Tokha Saraswati is a village and former Village Development Committee that is now part of Tokha Municipality in Kathmandu District in Province No. 3 of central Nepal. At the time of the 2011 Nepal census it had a population of 5,152 .
