= Namaste Falls =

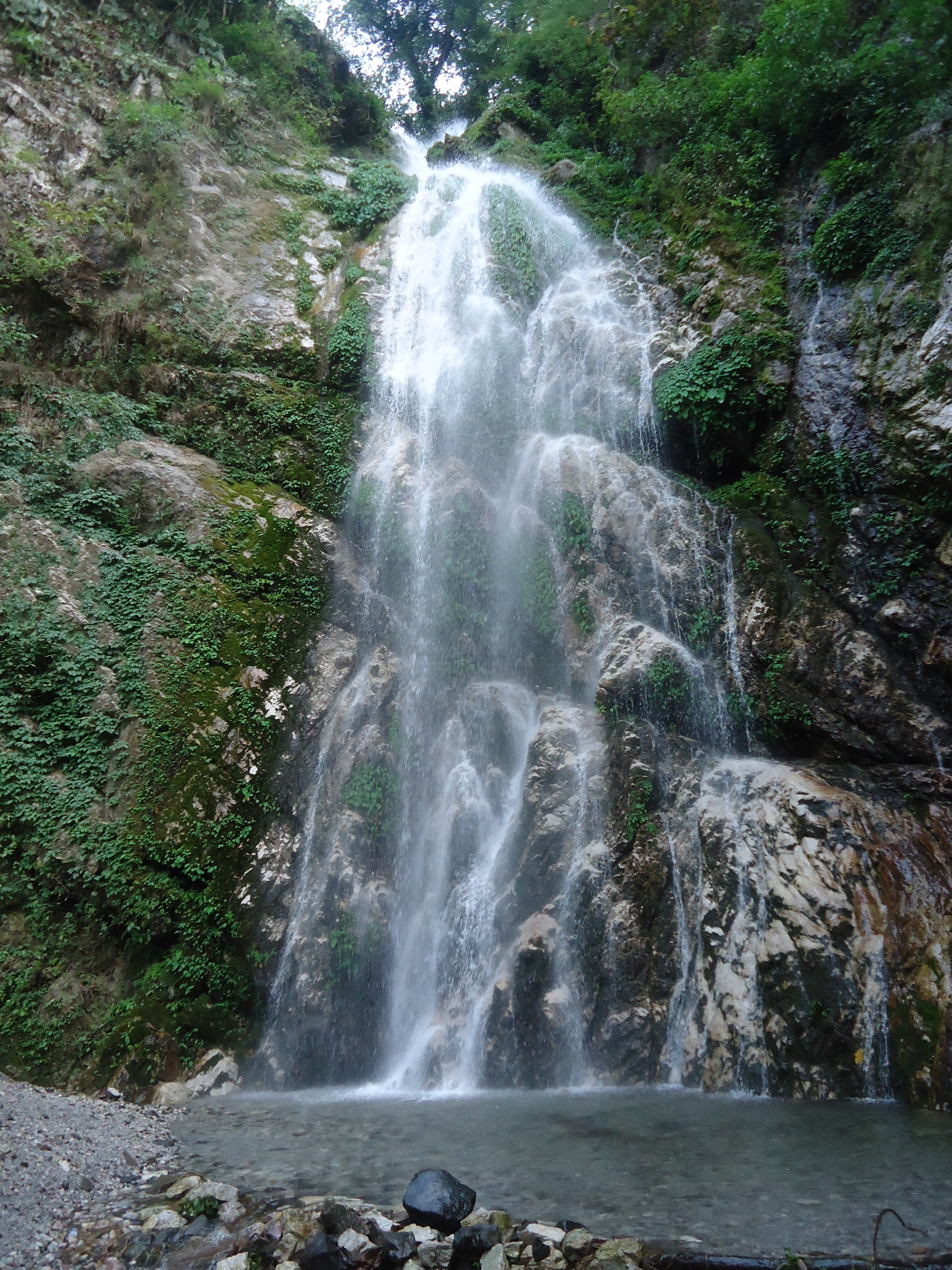
- Namaste Falls

- Location within Nepal
- Location: Bhedetar, Dhankuta, Nepal
- Coordinates: 26°52′16″N 87°19′48″E
- Type: Plunge
- Total height: 80 average
- Number of drops: 1

Namaste Falls (Nepali: नमस्ते झरना) (Limbu: ᤛᤧᤘᤠᤖᤥ ᤌᤢᤱᤛᤡᤱ, Sewaro Thungsing) is located in Bhedetar village development committee of Dhankuta district. It is popular among domestic tourists. The falls are about 80 meters high. Domestic tourists from Jhapa, Dhankuta, Morang and Sunsari visit this falls in large numbers. One can see a rainbow-like, seven-colour formation while standing close to the waterfall. It is in the shape of Namasthe. The falls are also frequently visited by researchers.

== Geography ==
It is located 8 km away from Vedatar.

== Tourism ==
Tourism is common in the area. Along with the falls, Vedatar and Agricultural Research Station on Pakhribas are located nearby. However, there are no human settlements nearby.

== Gallery ==
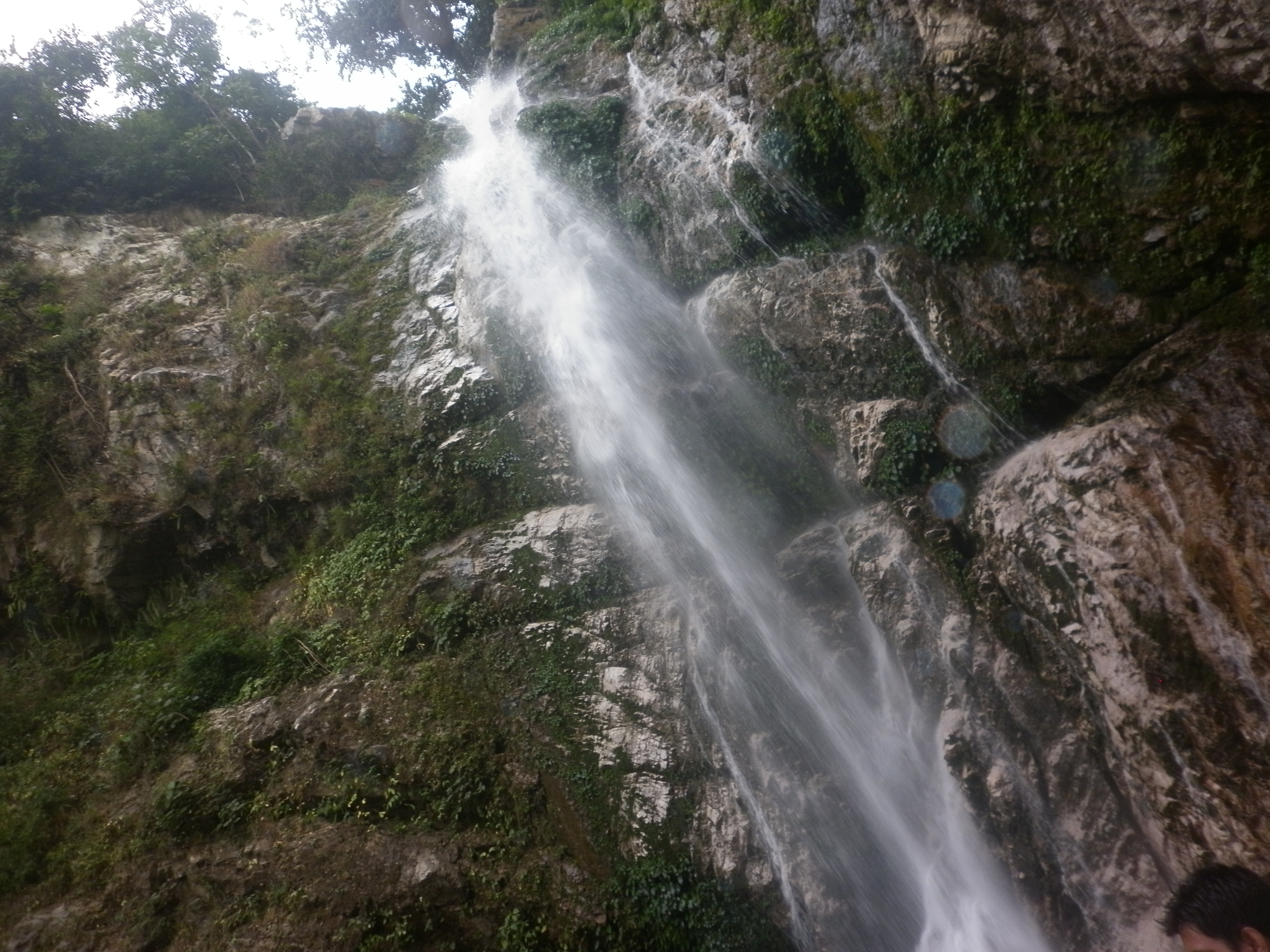
A full view of Namaste waterfall

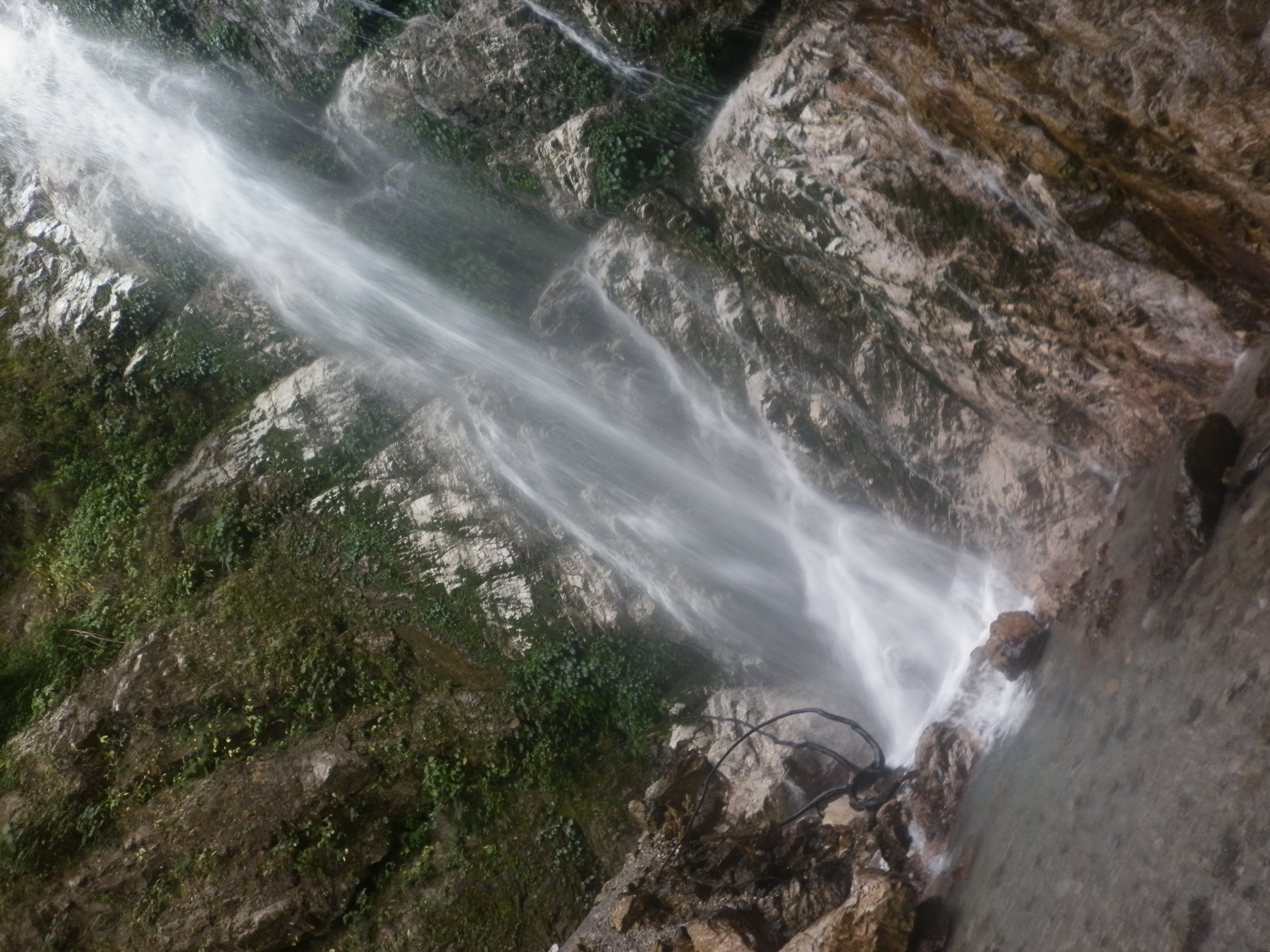
A full view of Namaste waterfall

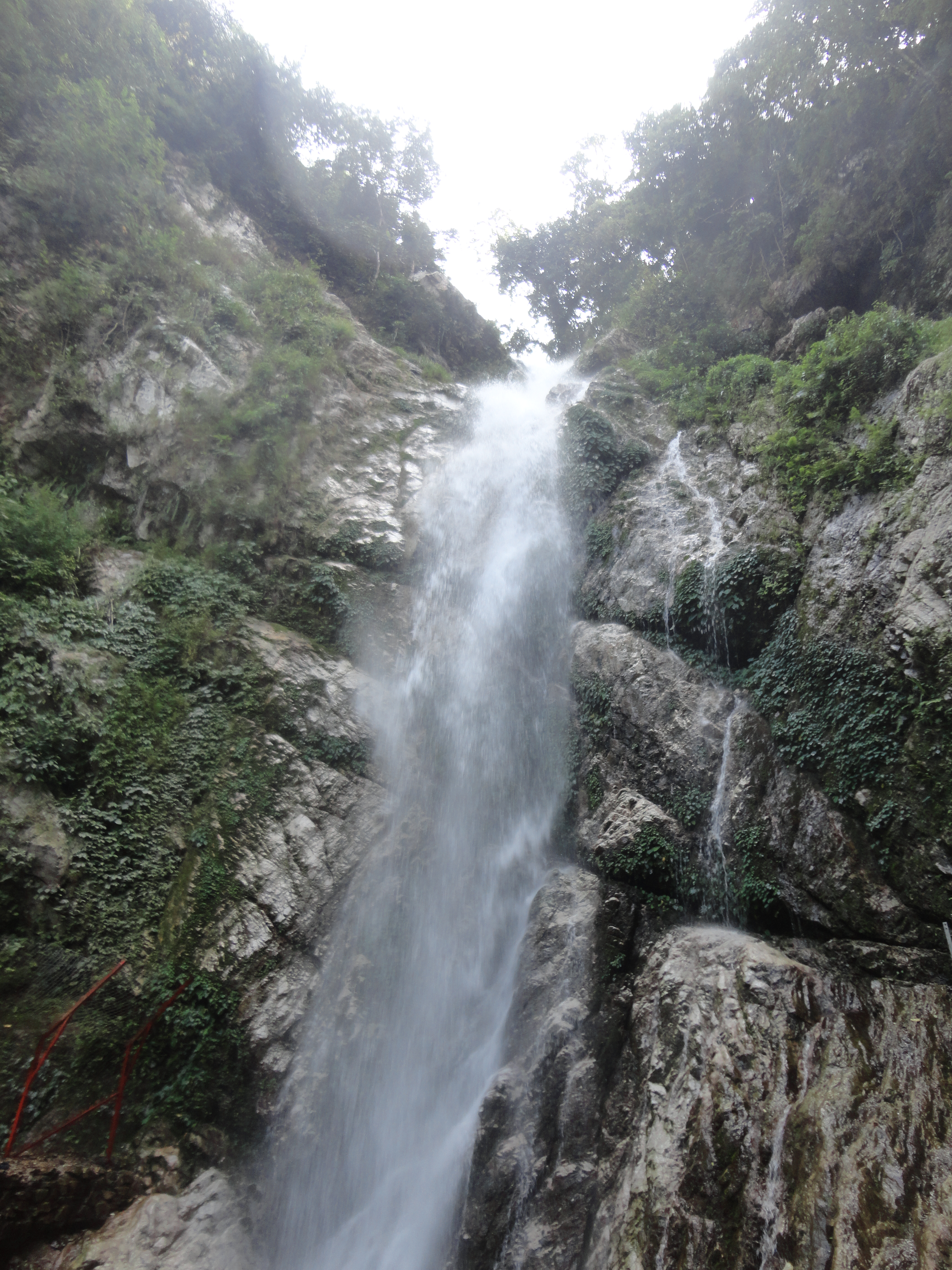
A full view of Namaste waterfall

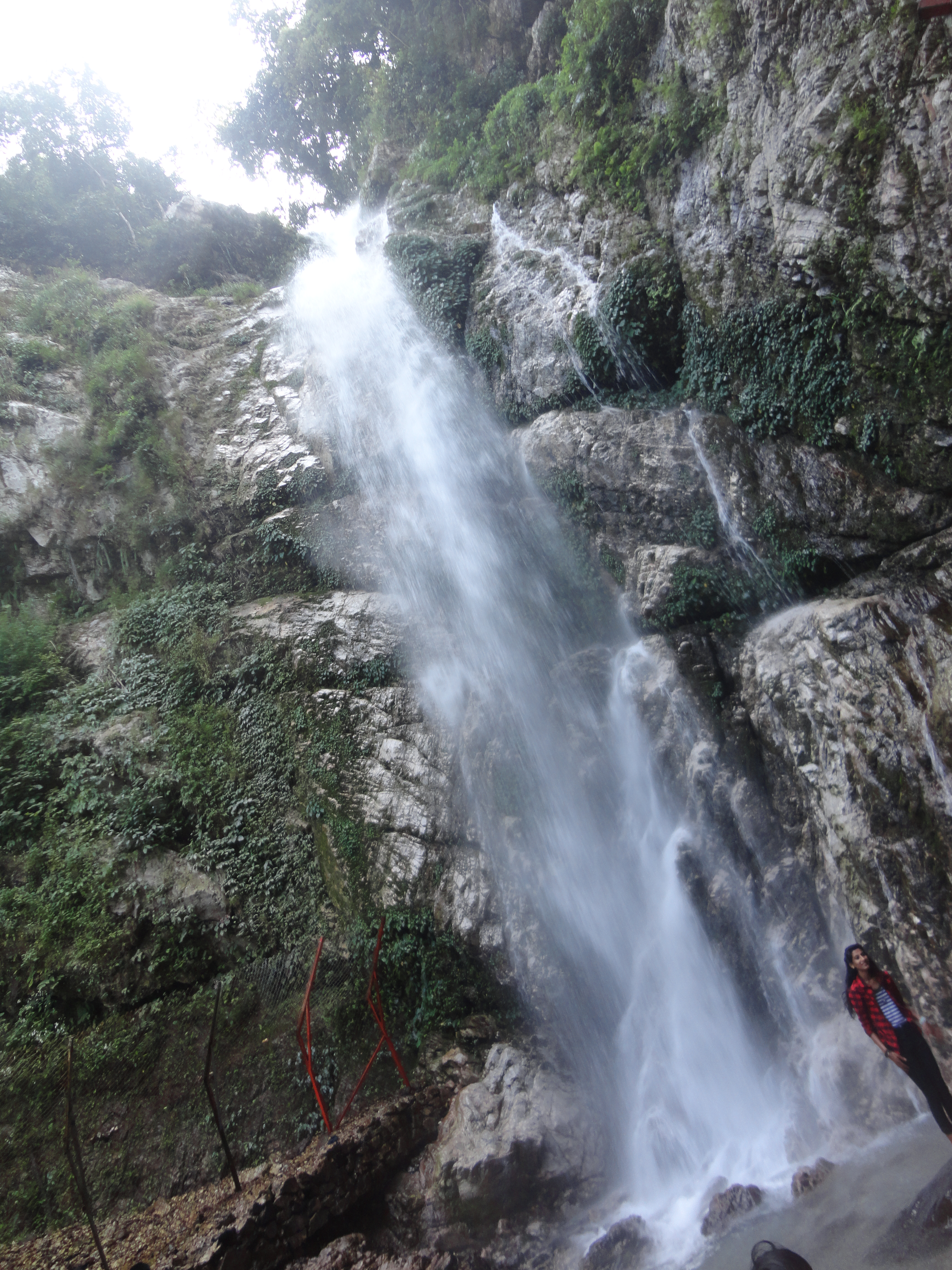
A full view of Namaste waterfall

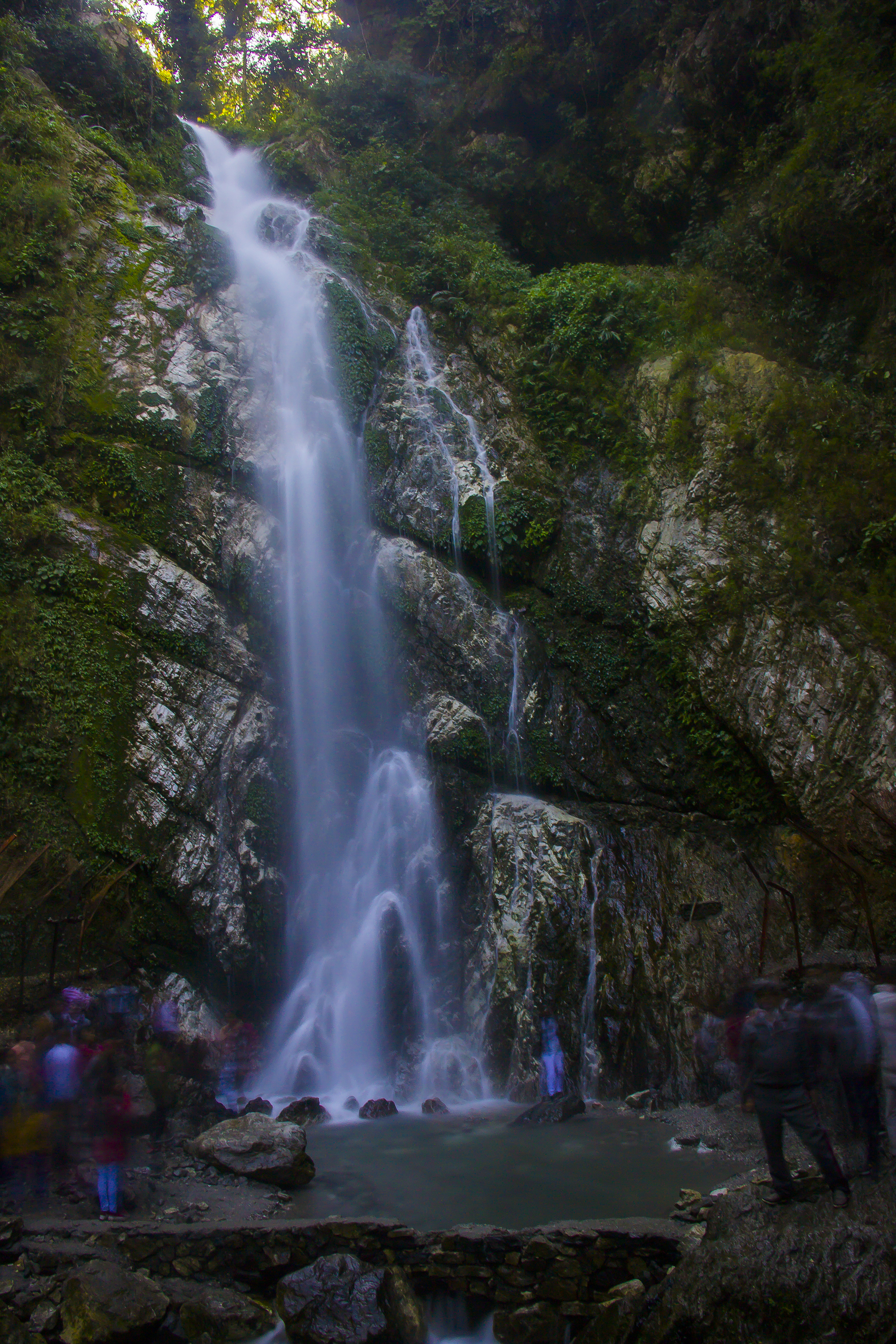
A full view of Namaste waterfall

== See also ==
- List of waterfalls
- List of waterfalls of Nepal
