= Lamo waterfall =

Waterfall in Nepal

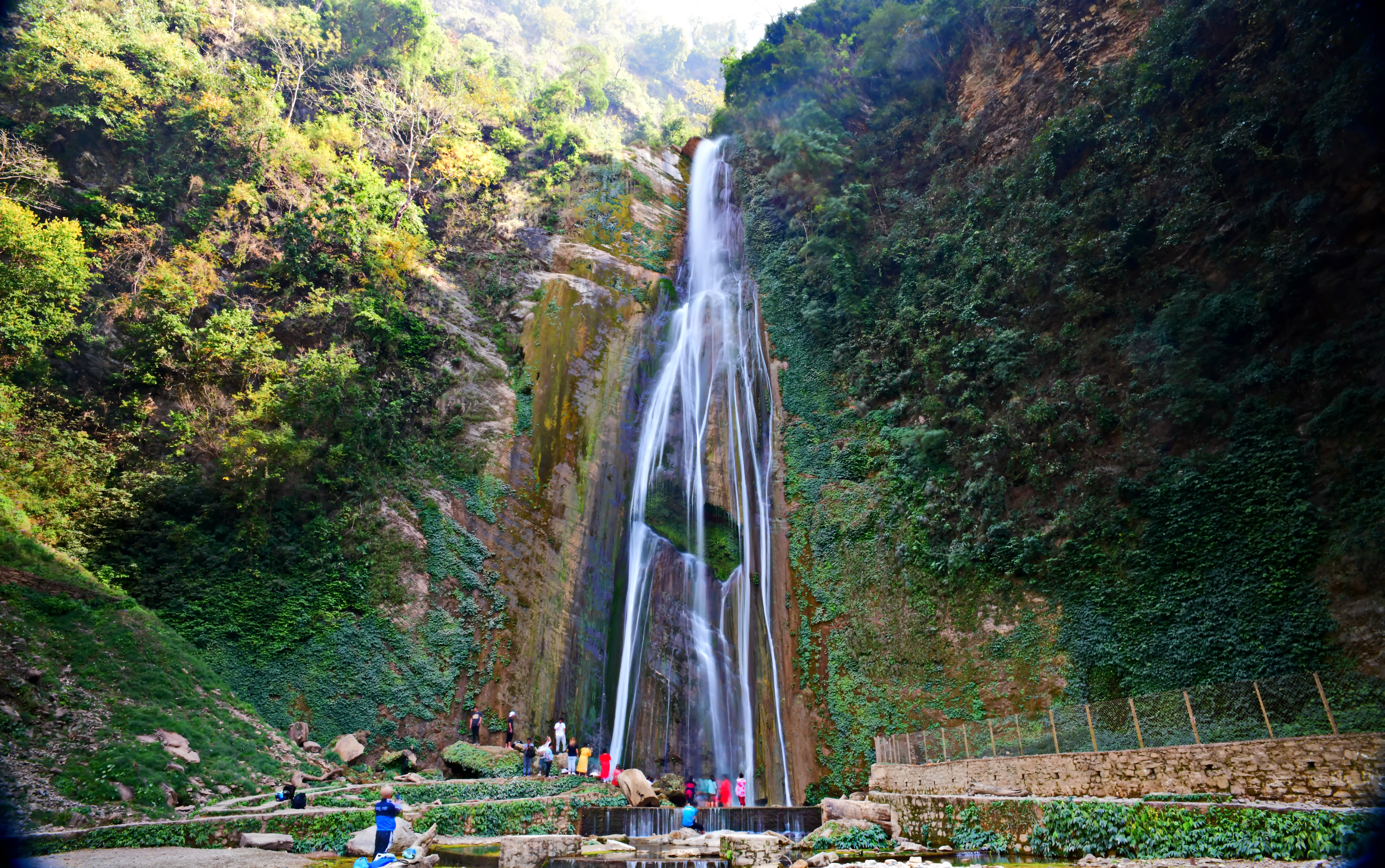

- Location within Nepal
- Location: Chitwan district, Nepal
- Coordinates: 27°49′26″N 84°31′23″E
- Total height: 60 m (200 ft)
- Watercourse: Trisuli River

Lamo waterfall (Nepali: लामो झरना), also known as Jalbire Jharana, is located in Chandi Vhanjhyang in the section of Muglin-Narayangarh Highway in Chitwan district of Nepal. The fall is about 60 meter high. A cannoying sports is also installed in the fall.

At the present, it is popular among adventure travelers for Jalbire Canyoning adventure sports in Nepal.

The fall can be accessed by a kilometer long trial from Jalbire Temple which is situated 6 km towards Narayangarh from Mugling.

== See also ==
- List of waterfalls
- List of waterfalls of Nepal
