= Tindhare Waterfall =

Waterfall in Nepal

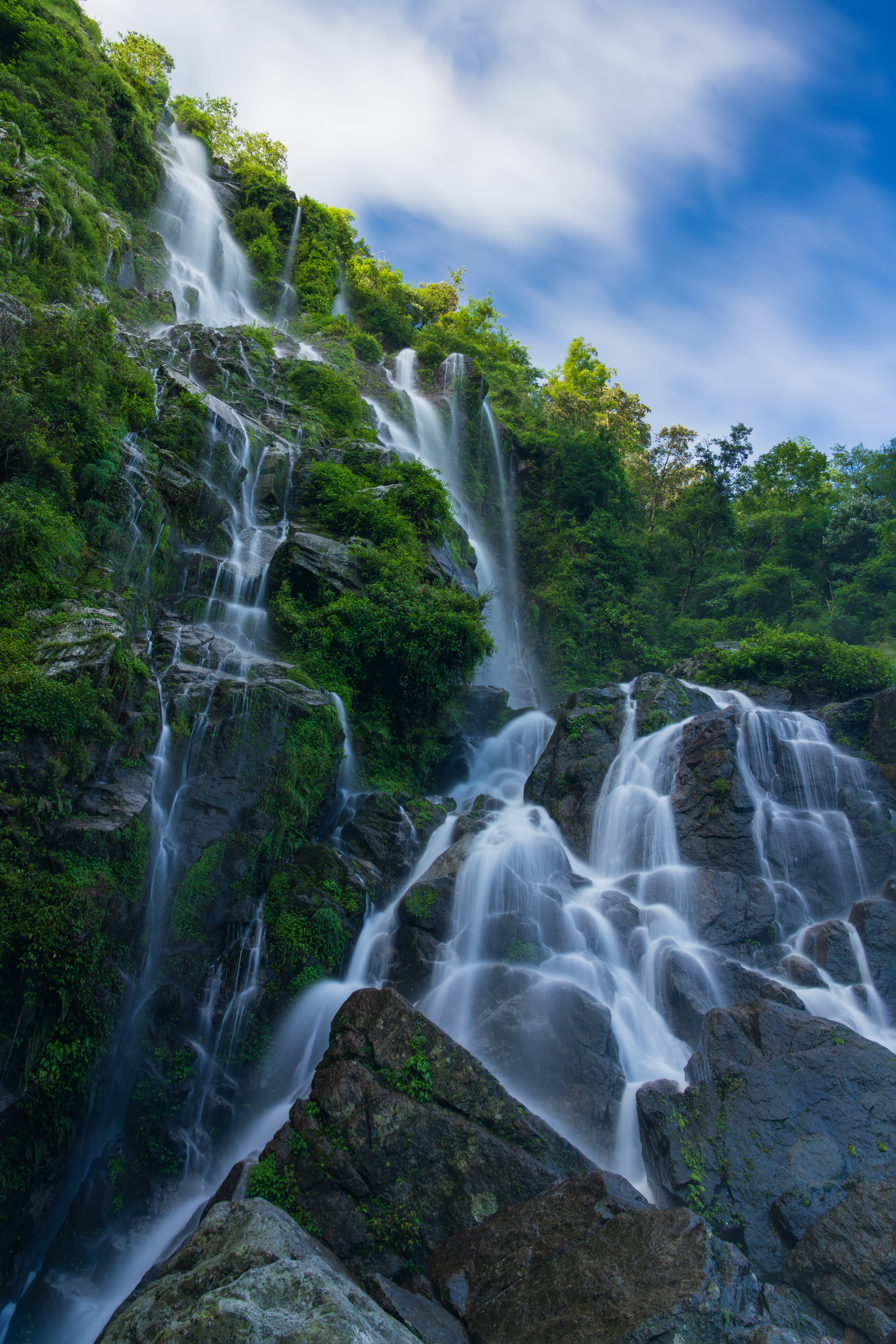

- Location within Nepal
- Location: Roshi Kavrepalanchok, Nepal
- Coordinates: 27°30′07″N 85°32′47″E
- Elevation: a. 1800 m
- Total height: a. 300 metres (980 ft)
- Watercourse: Roshi river

Tindhare Waterfall is a waterfall located in Roshi Rural Municipality of Kavrepalanchok District in Nepal. It has a height of about 300 metres (980 ft). The name of this waterfall is 'Tindhare' as it falls from the hill of Mahabharat Range in the form of three streams (tin dhārā).

== Geography and Tourism ==
Tindhare waterfall is located at a distance of 30 km from Dhulikhel, the district headquarters of Kavrepalanchok district. This waterfall can be reached by road from Kathmandu via Dhulikhel, Namobuddha Dapcha.

== See also ==
- List of waterfalls
- List of waterfalls of Nepal
