= Dhapasi =

Dhapasi धापासी
- Village of Tokha Municipality
- Location in Nepal
- Coordinates: 27.75°N 85.33°E
- Country: Nepal
- Province: No. 3
- District: Kathmandu District

Population (2011)
  - Total: 31,406
- Time zone: UTC+5:45 (Nepal Time)

Dhapasi is a residentially preferred village and former Village Development Committee that is now part of Tokha Municipality, just outside the Kathmandu Ring Road, in Kathmandu District in Province No. 3 of central Nepal. At the time of the 2011 Nepal census it had a population of 31,406 and had 8,202 households in it.
