= Simalchour Syampati =

Simalchaur Shyampati सिमलचौर श्यामपाटी
- Village development committee
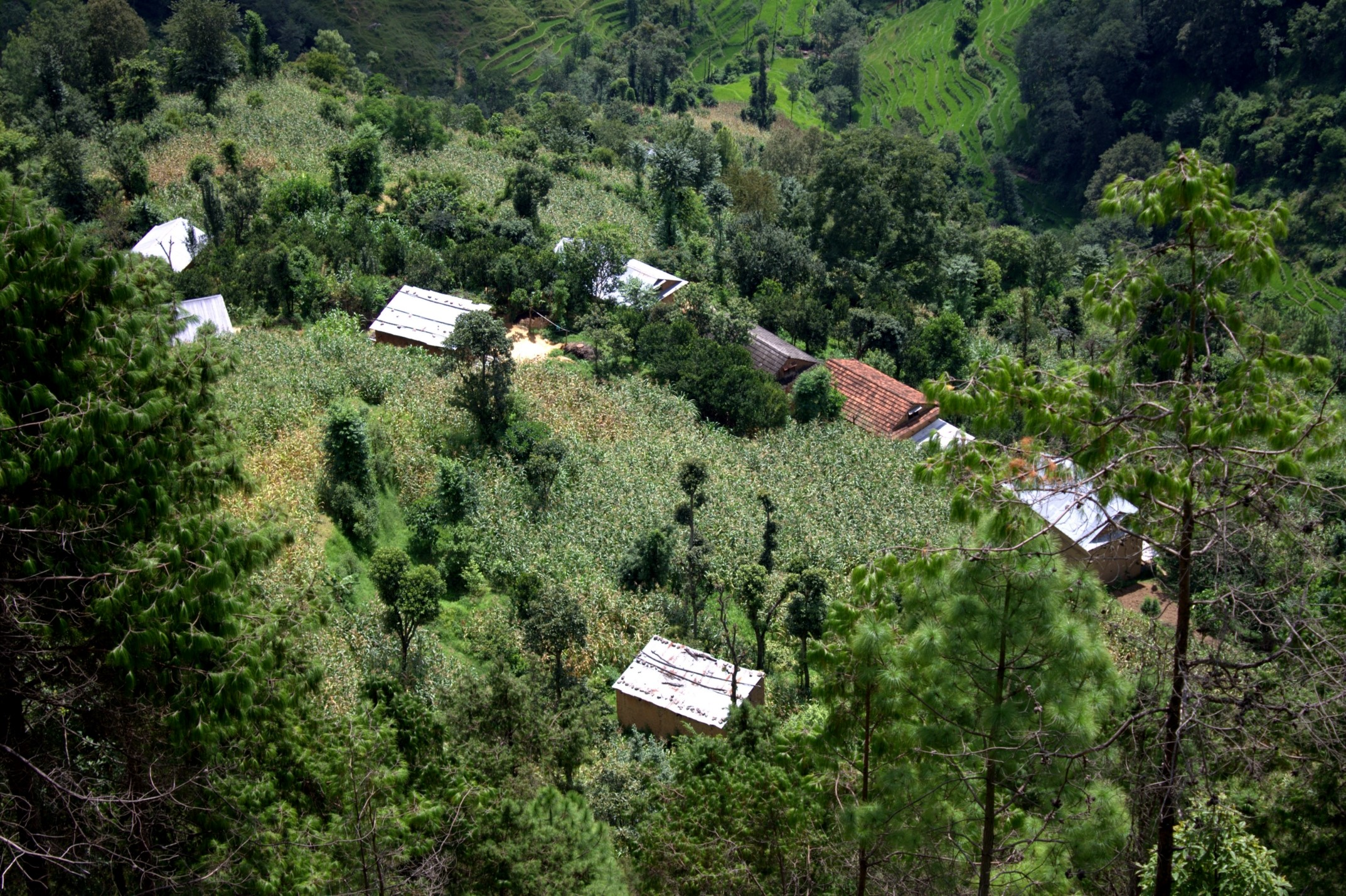
- Village of Shyampati

- Location in Nepal
- Coordinates: 27.56°N 85.58°E
- Country: Nepal
- Zone: Bagmati Zone
- District: Kabhrepalanchok District

Population (1991)
  - Total: 4,278
- Time zone: UTC+5:45 (Nepal Time)

Simalchaur Shyampati is a village development committee in Kabhrepalanchok District in the Bagmati Zone of central Nepal. At the time of the 1991 Nepal census it had a population of 4,278 .
