= Tokha Chandeshwari =

Tokha Chandeshwari टोखा चण्डेश्वरी
- Village of Tokha Municipality
- Location in Nepal
- Coordinates: 27.78°N 85.33°E
- Country: Nepal
- Province: No. 3
- District: Kathmandu District

Population (2011)
  - Total: 3,961
- Time zone: UTC+5:45 (Nepal Time)

Tokha Chandeshwari is a village and former Village Development Committee that is now part of Tokha Municipality in Kathmandu District in Province No. 3 of central Nepal. At the time of the 2011 Nepal census it had a population of 3,961. Tokha Chandeshwari now is part of Tokha municipality.

== Location ==
Tokha lies in Kathmandu district of Bagnmati zone of central development region. It consist of two VDCs: northern- Chandeshwari VDC and Southern-Sarshwati VDC. It is situated at an altitude of 130 m, longitude of and latitude of . As per category in geographical region, this village is situated in mountain region.

The area is surrounded by:

- East – Khadka Bhadrakali VDC
- West – Phutung VDC
- North – Jhor VDC
- South – Dhapasi and Gongabu VDC

The village is 4 km northern from Kathmandu MPC or Samakhusi ring road.

== Geology and topography ==
This area lies in Mahabharat Range, there is flat land on top and surround by slopes in all direction except North side, elevated part of jhor VDC and shivapuri national Park. As the study site lies within Kathmandu valley, the soil is lacustrine type.

== Population ==
The present population of this village is about 15,000 as per census of 2058 B.S. Occupation of people here is agricultural based and most adults are abroad in Gulf countries in search of work.

== Sanitation ==
The village is now in a rapid phase of modernization and urbanization. Tokha Municipality has been regulating and maintaining proper sewerage system. Plenty of clean drinking water is available in the locality. Therefore, the sanitary condition of the village is fine.

== Education ==
Most people are illiterate; very few people (only 5) had achieved master's degree in their related field. But number of students for higher education is being increasing past 3-4 year. As per education institution in this area, there are:

- 1 Higher secondary School – Saraswoti Higher Secondary School.
- 5 Secondary schools
  - Amar English Boarding Secondary School
  - Bindhya Basini English Secondary School
  - Ganesh English Secondary School
  - Laxmipur English Secondary School
  - Sri Saraswati Secondary School
  - Oasis Public Academy
- 1 Lower secondary School – Chandeshwari Lower Secondary School

Altogether 7 educational institutions.

== Festivals ==
Nepal is not only the land of mountains; it is also the land of festivals. There are more than 50 festivals celebrated in Nepal every year. While the national festivals have fixed dates, religious festivals are set by astrologers following the lunar calendar. The best part about the festivals in Nepal is that all the events are celebrated with the same enthusiasm and galore the way it used to be hundreds of years ago when people had no other means of entertainment.

New Year
It is known as “Navavarsha” in Nepal. Nepal has its official calendar that begins from the first day of the first month Baisakh. This very first day is observed as Nepali New Year which usually falls in the second week of April. People go for picnics, have get-togethers and celebrate the day socializing in various ways as this day is also a national holiday. In Tokha, New Year begins with new Festival i.e. Bisket Jatra of Tokha . It Begins from Baisakh 1st to Baisakh 5th. People of Tokha celebrate this festival very happily.

Sarashwati Puja
Saraswati Puja or Sri Panchami is a day to celebrate the birthday of Saraswati – the Goddess of Learning. This is a day when people from school students to scholars worship their pens and books to please the Goddess and expect her favor in their studies so they become wise and knowledgeable. People also throng around the idol of Goddess Sarashwati, especially in Swayambhunath and offer flowers, sweets, fruits, etc. On this day, small children are taught to read and write and people write on the stones and slabs with chalks and pencils. This day which falls between January/February is regarded as a very auspicious day for marriages too as it is believed that Goddess Saraswati herself blesses the couples. Normally it is the astrologers who fix the marriage date and time in Nepal.

Shivaratri (Maha Shivaratri)
Shivaratri or the night of Shiva that falls sometime between February/March is one of the major festivals of Nepal. This day is dedicated to Shiva or Mahadev who lived in Mt. Kailash in the Himalayas. Shiva is the most worshipped God in the Hindu religion. More than 100,000 of Hindu devotees from India and Southeast Asia throng weeks ahead of the festival and gather in and around Pashupatinath temple – one of the holiest shrines of the Hindus in Kathmandu to pay their homage to Shiva on his birthday. “Pashupatinath” literally means “the Lord of animals” as Shiva is considered as the guardian and protector of everything that exists in the Himalayan Kingdom. On this holy day, worshippers take dip and bath in the holy river at early dawn and fast for the whole day and stay around fire to keep them warm as it is still winter in Nepal. The devotees also freely indulge in using marijuana and other intoxicating substances as these things are believed to please Shiva and marijuana use is legal only on this sacred day.

Holi
This festival of water and colors that falls between February/March is also known as “Phagu” in Nepal. This day is observed to rejoice the extermination of female demon Holika who together with her King brother conspired to kill his son Pralhad, an ardent devotee of Vishnu. This day, playful people especially the young ones wander through the streets in groups on foot or vehicles with various colors smeared all over them and the people in houses make merry throwing colors and water balloons at each other and also to these people on the streets.

Ghode Jatra (Festival of Horses)
This festival takes place between March/April and a grand horse parade takes place at Tundikhel. Although this festival does not have much of religious aspects, a large number of people, even from outside Kathmandu flock around Kathmandu to witness the horse race and other exciting sports activities performed by the Army in the presence of the King and the royal family.

Buddha Jayanti
Buddha's birth anniversary is celebrated every year during May in Nepal. On this day people swarm in Swayambhunath and Boudhanath to pay homage to Buddha and also visit Buddha's birthplace in Lumbini and chant prayers and burn butter lamps. Buddha was born as Prince Siddhartha Gautam but he abandoned his luxurious life when he realized the misery of mankind and went in search of enlightenment.

Gai Jatra (Cow Festival)
This festival of cow is celebrated every year in August/September. This is one of the most popular festivals in Nepal as it has much humor, satire, comedy, mockery and shades of sadness too at the same time. And on this day satires and jokes on anybody is legal. As per the tradition, the family who has lost a relative during the past one year must take part in a procession by sending young boys in cow like attire and walk through the streets of Kathmandu led by a cow. Cow is regarded as a Goddess and it is also the national animal of Nepal. This festival also purges many who have lost their loved ones as they get to console themselves as to they are not the only ones who have been bereaved and it also teaches to accept death as a part of life.

Krishna Janmastami
The birth anniversary of Sri Krishna, believed to be the 8th incarnation of Vishnu falls sometime in August/September. All the devotees assemble in Krishna Mandir, the ancient Krishna Temple in Patan Durbar Square and other temples with the idol of Sri Krishna and offer prayers, flowers, food, sweets and chant hymns too.

Tij
This is a Hindu married woman's day for her man. This festival is celebrated in August/September. Women clad in beautiful red saris with shining potes (glass beads), singing and dancing is the sight almost everywhere in Nepal during the festival of Teej. On this day women observe a fast and pray Shiva for the long, healthy and prosperous life of their husbands and their families. The unmarried women also observe this festival with unabated zeal with the hope that they will get to marry good husbands. From early dawn, women queue up in the multiple lines in Pashupatinath to offer their prayers to Shiva.

Indra Jatra
This festival named after Indra – the God of Rain and also the King of Heaven is celebrated by both the Buddhists and Hindus in Nepal in August/September. This festival lasts for eight days with singing, mask dancing and rejoicing. The chariot of Kumari – the Living Goddess is taken through the main streets of Kathmandu with much fanfare. On the first day, the King of Nepal also pays homage to Goddess Kumari. The crowd of excited people from performers to spectators engulfs the streets of Kathmandu during this festival. People get to enjoy various classical dances like elephant dance, lakhe – a very popular dance of a man with a mask.

Tihar
This festival of lights that falls between October/November is the second biggest festival after Dashain. This festival lasts for five days and people worship Laxmi – the Goddess of Wealth. All the houses are cleaned and decorated with the belief that Goddess Laxmi will enter the house that is the cleanest and people lit candles, oil lamps and other lights and the whole place looks illuminating. During the five days, crows, dogs and cows are worshipped and honored with vermilion, garland and delicious food for what they have done in the lives of humans. Crows are regarded as the messenger that brought news even during the times when there were no postmen and no postal services. Dogs are the most obedient animals and they guard our house as true guardians. Cow is also a symbol of wealth in Hinduism and she is also the national animal of Nepal. During Tihar, the Newars in Nepal also observes Mha Puja – a ritual of worshipping one's own body and life. On this very day, the Lunar New Year which is known as Nepal Sambat begins. The festival ends with Bhai Tika – brothers’ day when his sisters worship him for his long and healthy life to safeguard the lives of his sisters.

Dashain (Bijaya Dashami)
During the month of Kartik (late September and early October), the Nepalese people indulge in the biggest festival of the year, Dashain. Dashain is the longest and the most auspicious festival in the Nepalese annual calendar, celebrated by Nepalese of all caste and creed throughout the country. The fifteen days of celebration occurs during the bright lunar fortnight ending on the day of the full moon. Thorough out the kingdom of Nepal the goddess Durga in all her manifestations are worshiped with innumerable pujas, abundant offerings and thousands of animal sacrifices for the ritual holy bathing, thus drenching the goddess for days in blood.

== Social organization ==
There are many business or social organizations in Tokha Municapility

SN	Organization Name	Type	Established	Nickname	Motto	Logo	Reference
1	Nepa Youth Club	Non-Profit Youth Social Organization	2074 B.S	NYC	We Rise By Lifting Others.	Nepa Youth Club, Tokha	nepayouthclub.com.np
