= Dulal =

Dulal is a given name and a surname. It is a common last name in Asia, especially in Nepal, India, Pakistan and Bangladesh. In Pakistan, the Dulal tribe is confined to the Gujar Khan Tehsil of Rawalpindi district. The name is also found in some parts of Africa due to the importation of South Asians by the British.

Notable people with the name include:

== Given name ==
- Dulal Baruah (died 2008), Indian politician
- Dulal Bhuiyan, Indian politician
- Dulal Biswas (born 1973), Indian footballer
- Dulal Dutta (c. 1925–2010), Indian film editor
- Dulal Guha (1929–2001), Indian film director
- Dulal Lahiri (born 1947), Indian film and television actor

== Surname ==
- Sunita Dulal, Nepalese folk singer

== See also ==
- Dulalthok, village in Kabhre, Nepal, named after the Dulal surname
