= Tokha =

Tokha टोखा
- Municipality (नगरपालिका)
- Tokha Municipality
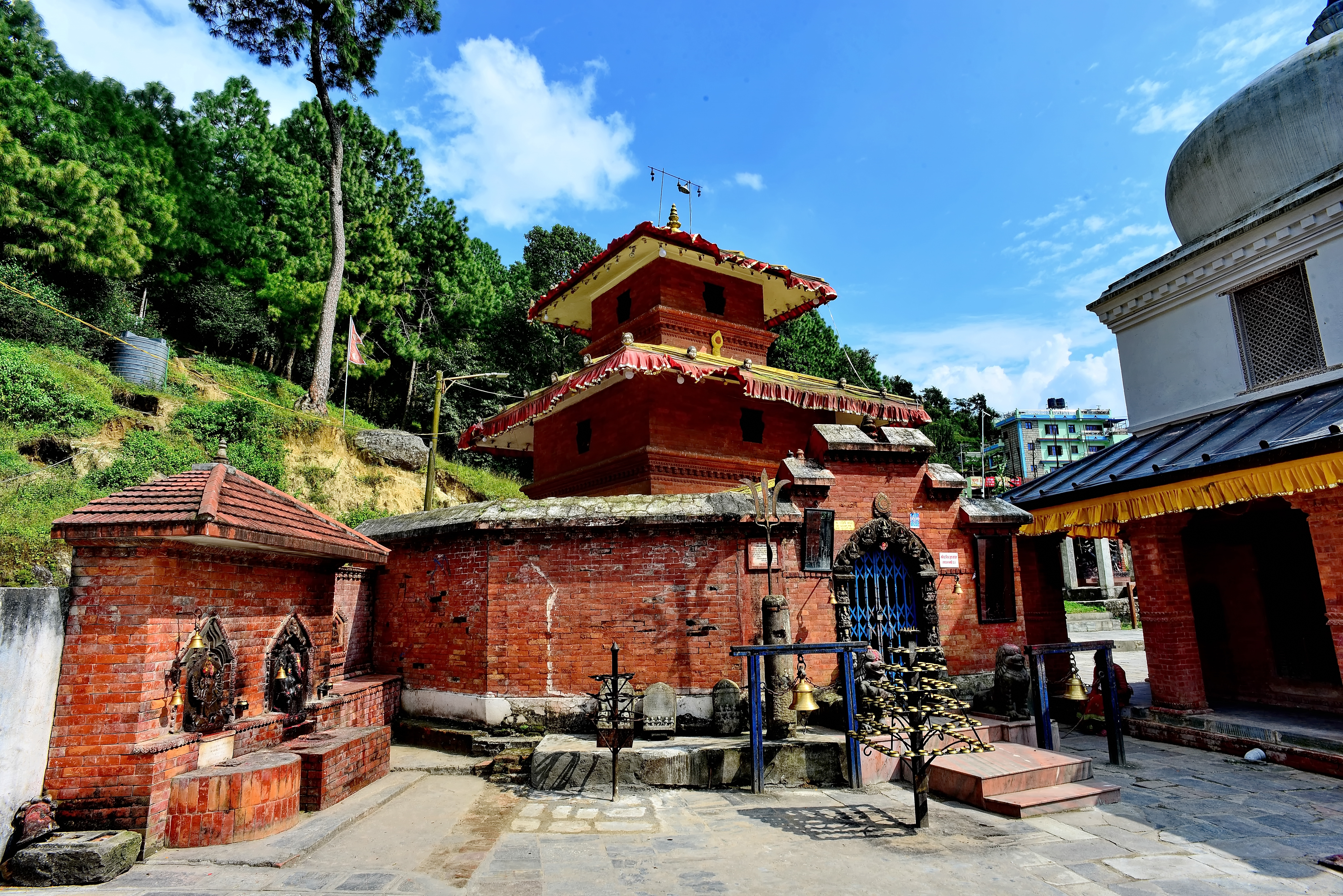
- Tokha Chandeshwori Temple, Tokha Municipality

- Location in Nepal Tokha (Nepal)
- Coordinates: 27°45′33″N 85°19′42″E
- Country: Nepal
- Province: Bagmati
- District: Kathmandu
- Established: 2 December 2014

Government
  - Mayor: Prakash Adhikari (NCP)
  - Deputy Mayor: Murari Tamang (NC)

Area
  - Total: 16.9 km^{2} (6.5 sq mi)

Population (2021 Nepal census)
  - Total: 133,755
  - Density: 7,910/km^{2} (20,500/sq mi)
  - Ethnicities: Newar Bahun Chhetri Tamang Magar
  - Language: Nepali Nepal Bhasa Tamang Bhasa Dhut Magar
- Time zone: UTC+5:45 (NST)
- Website: www.tokhamun.gov.np/en

Tokha (Nepali: टोखा) is a municipality in Kathmandu District in Bagmati Province of Nepal established 2 December 2014 by merging the former Village development committees Dhapasi, Jhor Mahankal, Gongabu, Tokha Chandeshwari and Tokha Saraswati. The municipality derives its name from the historical town of Tokha (current ward 2 and 3).

== Etymology ==
Tokha comes from two Newari words Tu, meaning 'sugarcane' and Khya meaning 'field'. Tokha is known for its production of chaku, a delicacy made from raw sugarcane juice.

== Population ==
Tokha has a total population of 99,032 according to the 2011 Nepal census. There are 25,561 families in the municipality. The total male population is 48,323 and the female population is 50,909. The population of the municipality grew to 133,755 at the 2021 Nepal census. Around 99.4% of the residents were Nepali citizens and 91.1% were literate in 2021.

== Governance ==
Tokha was created as a municipality on 2 December 2014 after merging Dhapasi, Jhor Mahankal, Gongabu, Tokha Chandeshwari and Tokha Saraswati. Since 2017, Tokha has been divided into 11 wards. Each ward has four ward members, two male members, one female member and one minority member, and one ward chairperson who are elected for a five-year term. The municipality is headed by a directly elected mayor. Prakash Adhikari was the first directly elected mayor of the municipality, elected in May 2017. The current municipal council has 36 members from Nepal Communist Party and 21 members from Nepali Congress.

== Social Organization ==
There are many business or social organizations in Tokha Municapility. The List of Organization who are established for the change of the nation by youth. We believe for the change the Organization Is necessary in any part of Nation.

SN	Organization Name	Type	Established	Nickname	Motto	Logo	Reference
1	Nepa Youth Club	Non-Profit Youth Social Organization	2074 B.S	NYC	We Rise By Lifting Others.	Nepa Youth Club, Tokha	nepayouthclub.com.np

== Sports ==
Shree Bhagwati Club, an amateur football club, which plays in the Martyr's Memorial B-Division League, is based in Tokha.
