= Samakhushi =

- Neighborhood in Kathmandu
- Location in Kathmandu
- Coordinates: 27.7273°N 85.3175°E
- Country: Nepal
- Province: Bagmati Province
- District: Kathmandu
- Postal Code: 44600

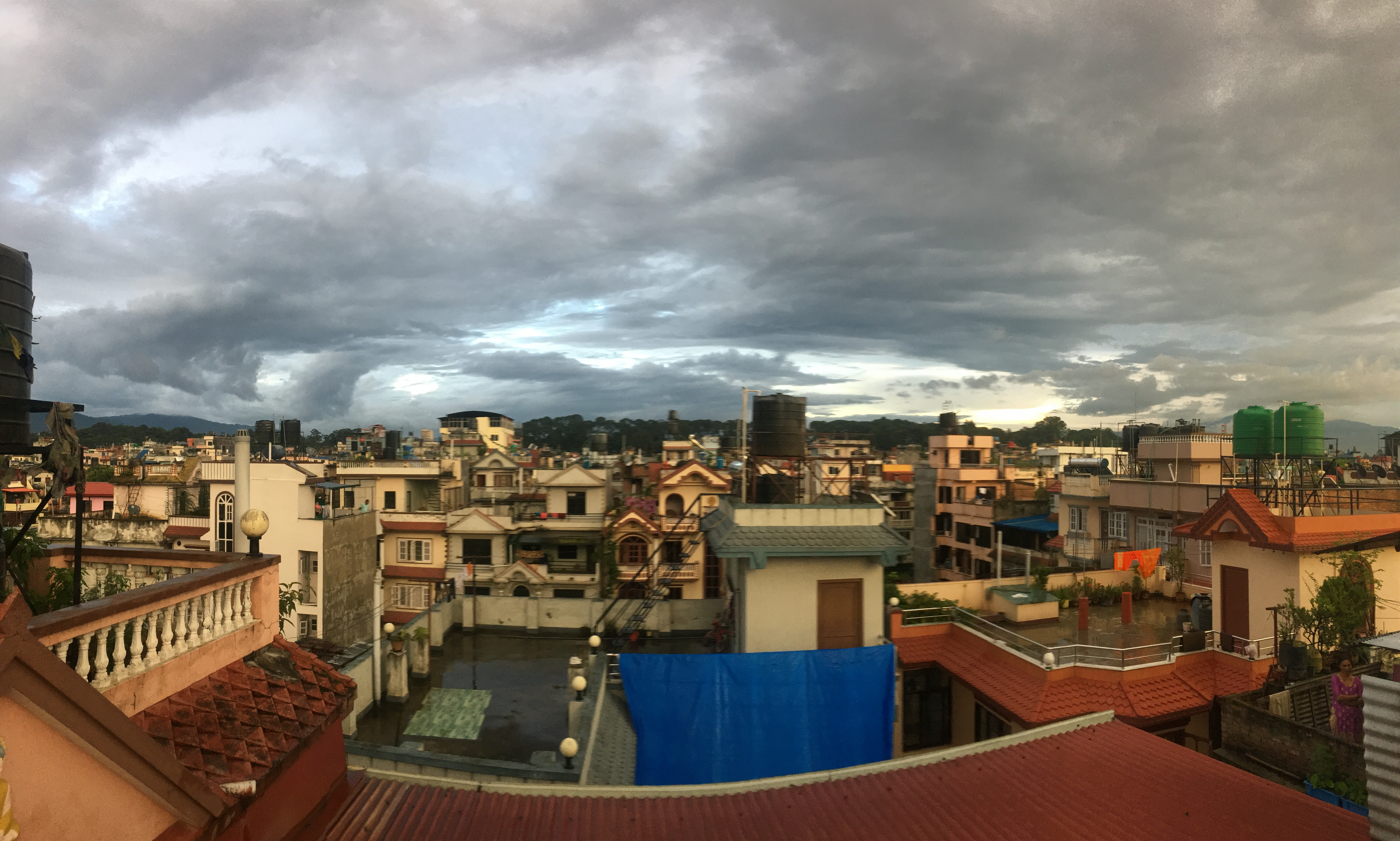
Samakhushi

Samakhushi

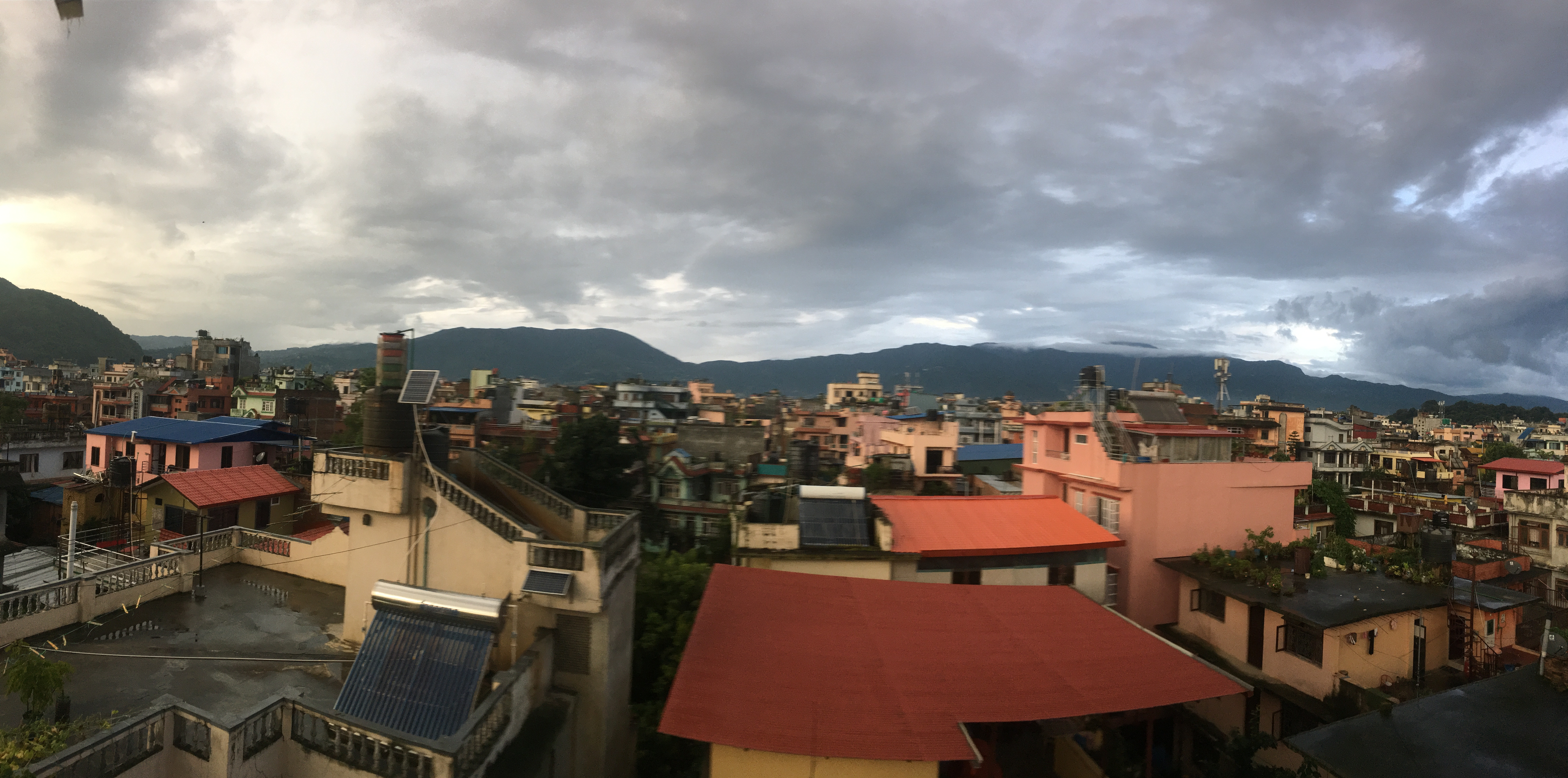
Samakhushi

Samakhushi is an urban city in Nepal located within Kathmandu. It is roughly 10 minutes from Golkopakha, Thamel. It is about 2km from the Kathmandu city center.

Samakhushi is one of the cities within Kathmandu which is viewed as a peaceful area. Its neighbouring cities are Ranibari to the east, Gangabu to the north, Balaju to the west and Golkopakha (towards Thamel) to the south. Samakhushi has always been a commuting road for people from Tokha, Nuwakot, Jhor, Kakani to go centre of Kathamndu, Kastamandap.

The tourist attractions include Shankhadhar Park, Kathmandu Durbar Square, Pashupatinath Temple, and Swayambhunath Stupa.

The low-lying areas are affected by urban floods during monsoons.

== Coordinates ==
Its latitude and longitude coordinates are: 27.7732445 and 85.317497.
