= Davis Falls =

Waterfall in Nepal

- पातालको छाँगो (Paatal Ko Chango)
- Devi's Fall, David's Falls
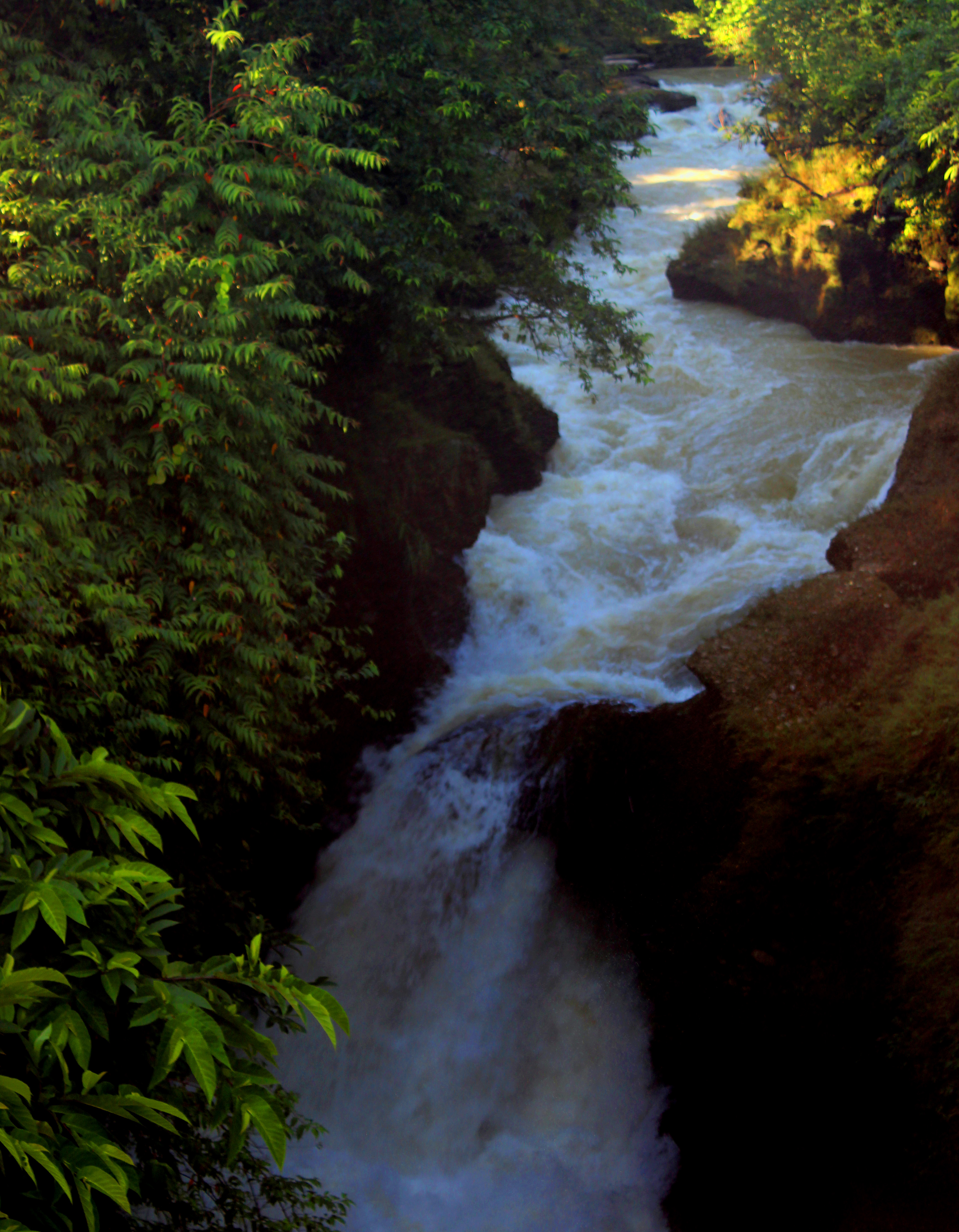
- Devi's Fall during the monsoon season.
- Interactive map of Davis Falls
- Location: Pokhara, Kaski, Nepal
- Coordinates: 28.19°N 83.96°E
- Type: Plunge
- Number of drops: 1

Davis Falls (Nepali: पाताले छाँगो) also known as David's Falls or Devi's Falls in English and known in Nepali पातालको छाँगो (Paatal Ko Chango) literally meaning “Underworld’s Waterfall” is a waterfall located in Pokhara in Kaski District, Nepal. The water forms a tunnel after reaching the bottom. This tunnel is approximately 500 feet (150 m) long and runs 100 feet (30 m) below ground level. On 31 July 1961, a Swiss couple went swimming but the woman drowned in the pit because of the overflow. Her body was recovered three days later in the river Phusre with great effort. Her father wished to name it "David's Fall" after his daughter. This is one of the most visited places in Nepal.

After exiting the tunnel, the water passes through a cave called Gupteshwor Mahadev Cave or "cave beneath the ground". The Phewa Lake dam is the water source of this falls. The cave is a tourist site because it has complex designs and people even forget the way which is inside the cave.

== Tourism ==
Thousands of Nepalis visit for recreation and enjoyment. Visitors can try their luck on the luck pond constructed there by throwing and placing the coin on the statue of God. Likewise, one can find a model of traditional typical Nepali house and a series of statue of Nepali people wearing traditional dresses where visitors can click photo.

== Gallery ==
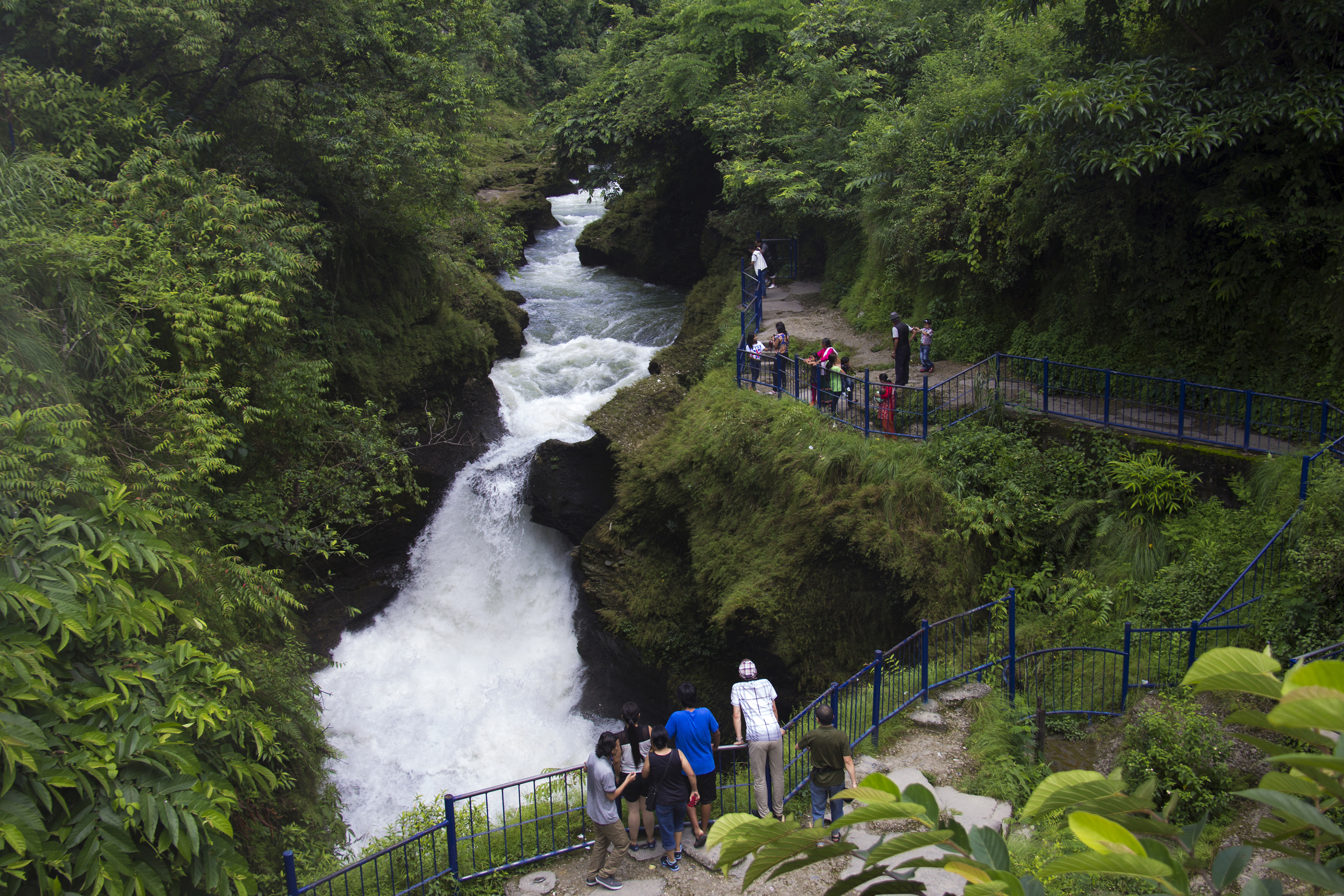
Davis Falls and the visitors

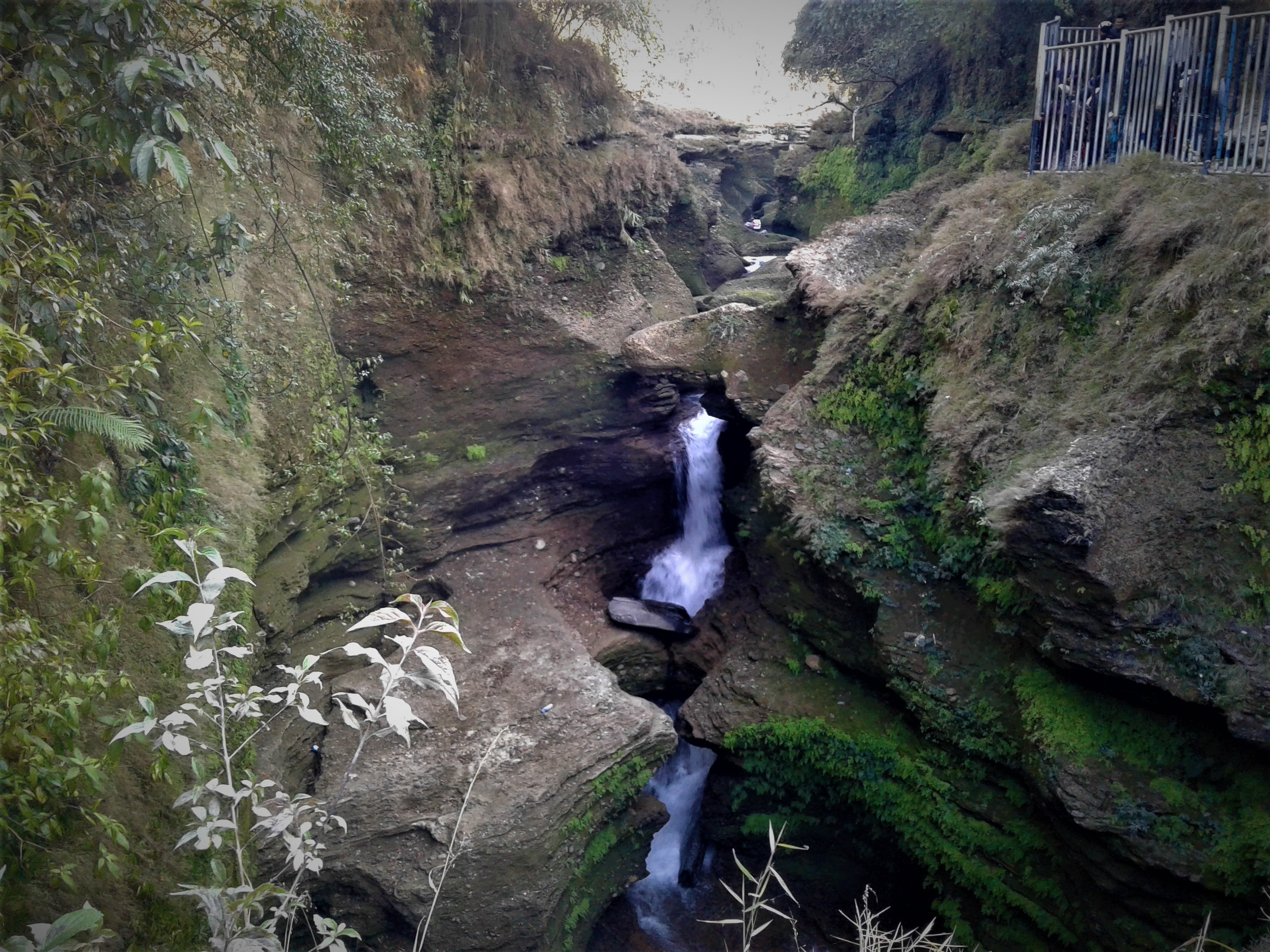
Davis Fall Pokhara

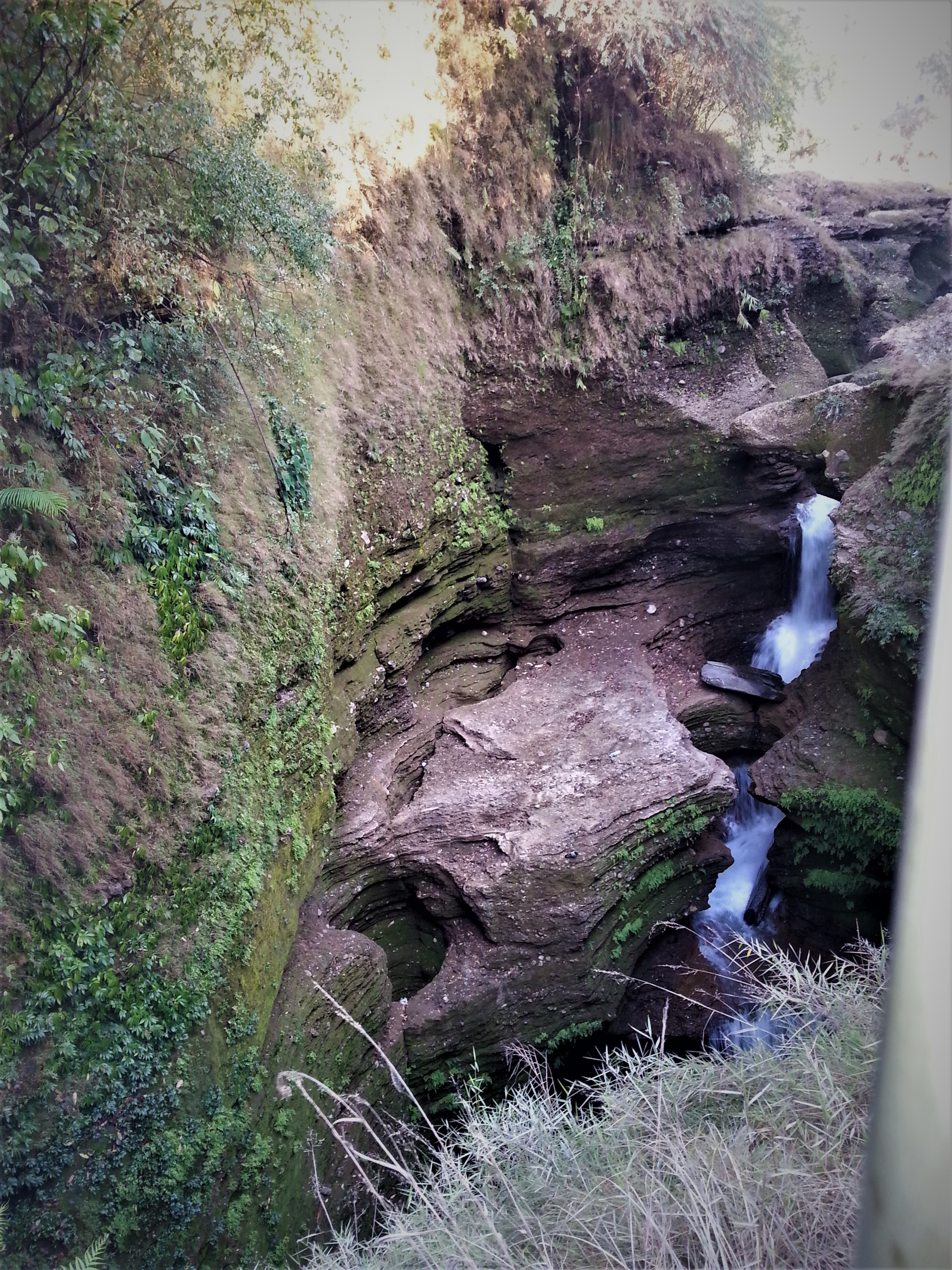
Davis Fall Pokhara

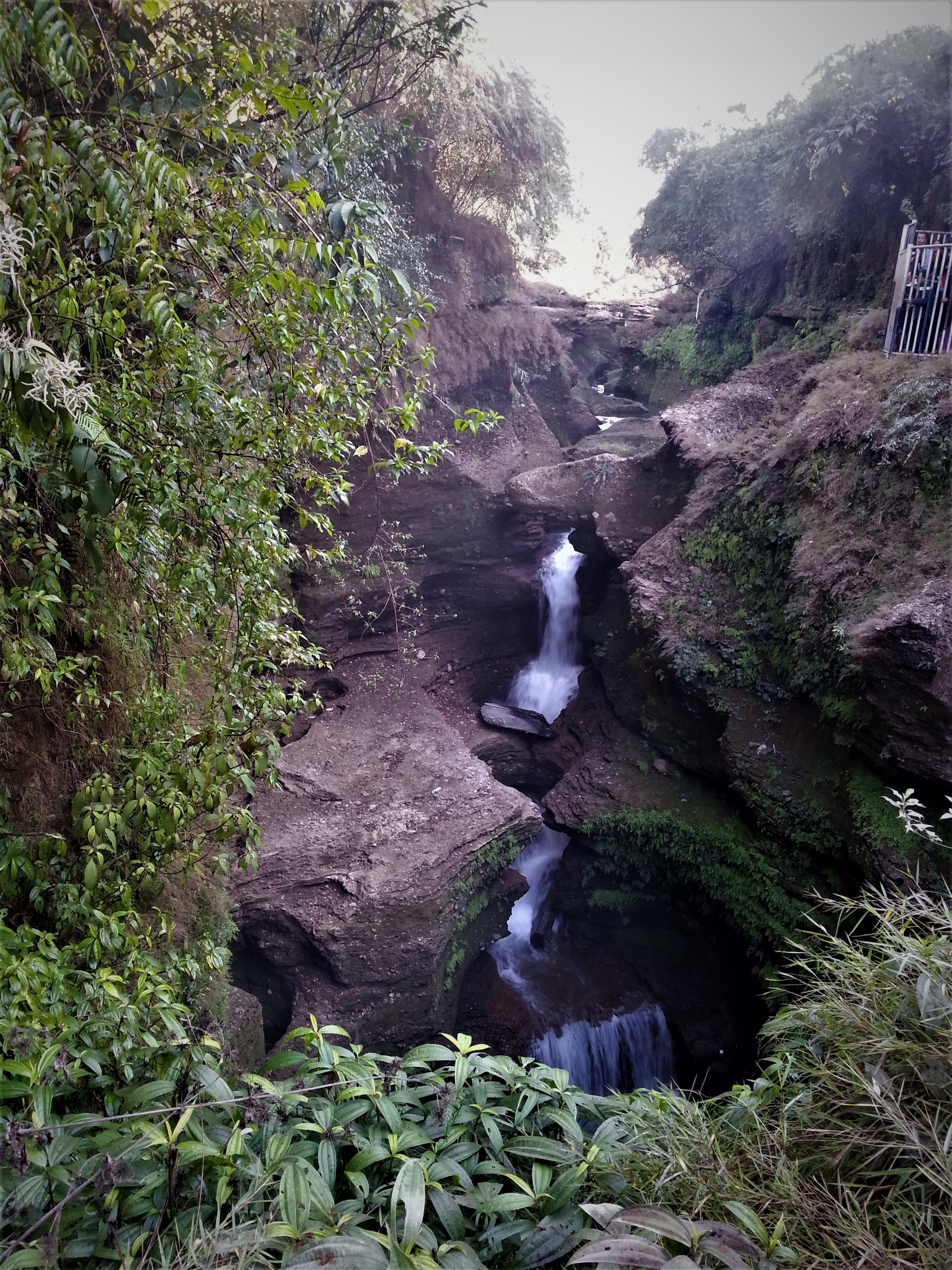
Davis Fall Pokhara

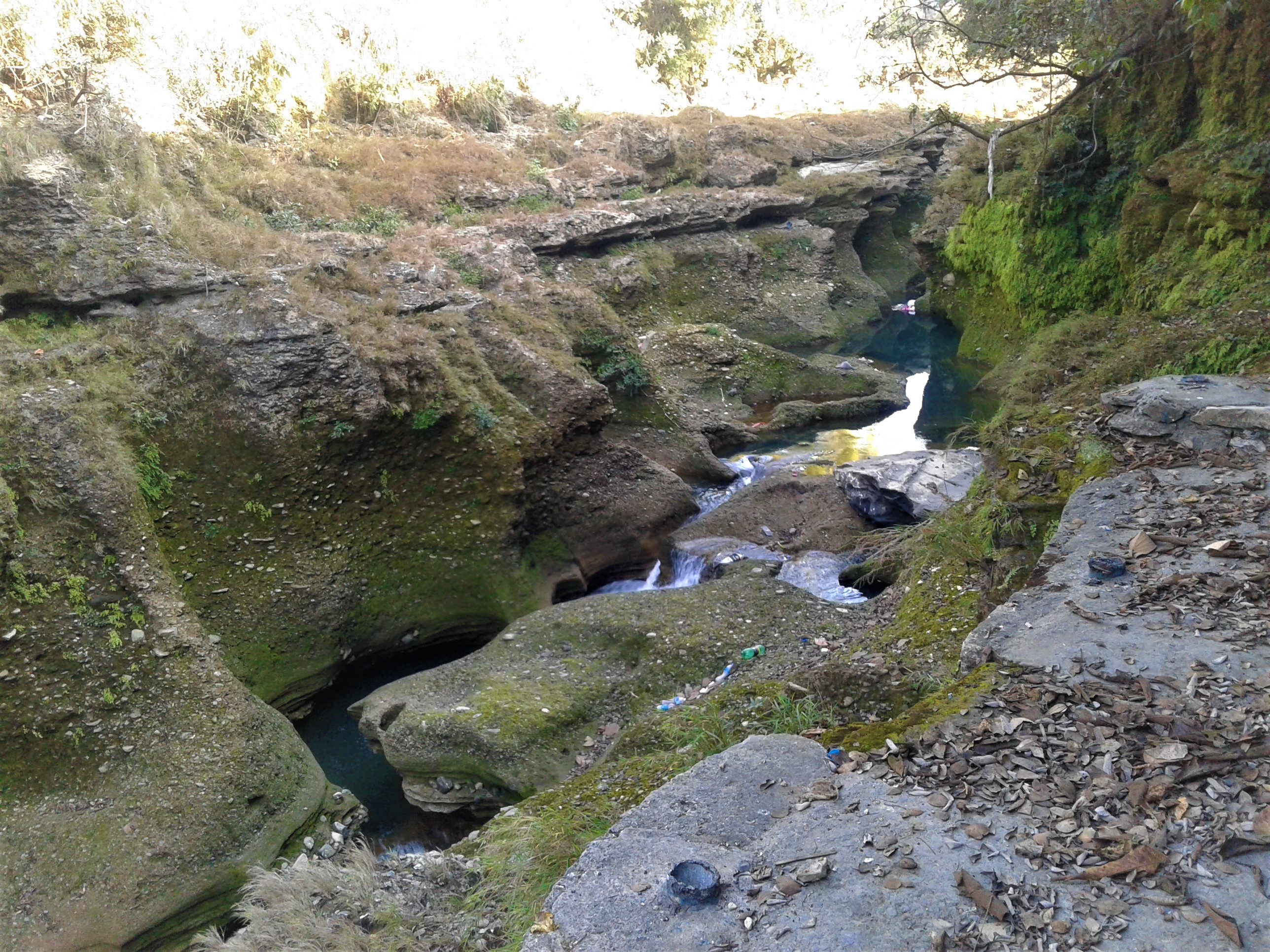
Davis Fall

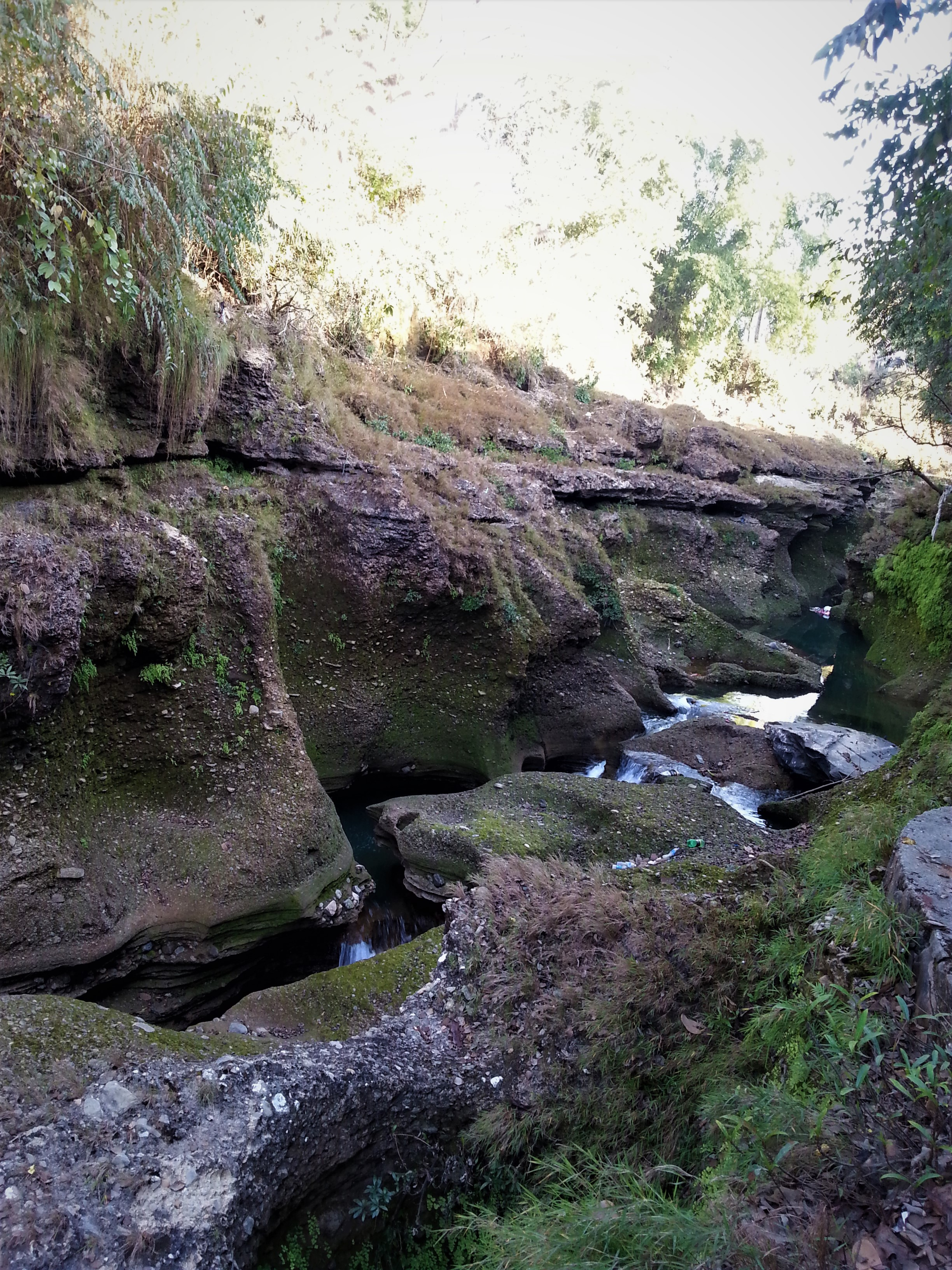
Davis Fall Pokhara

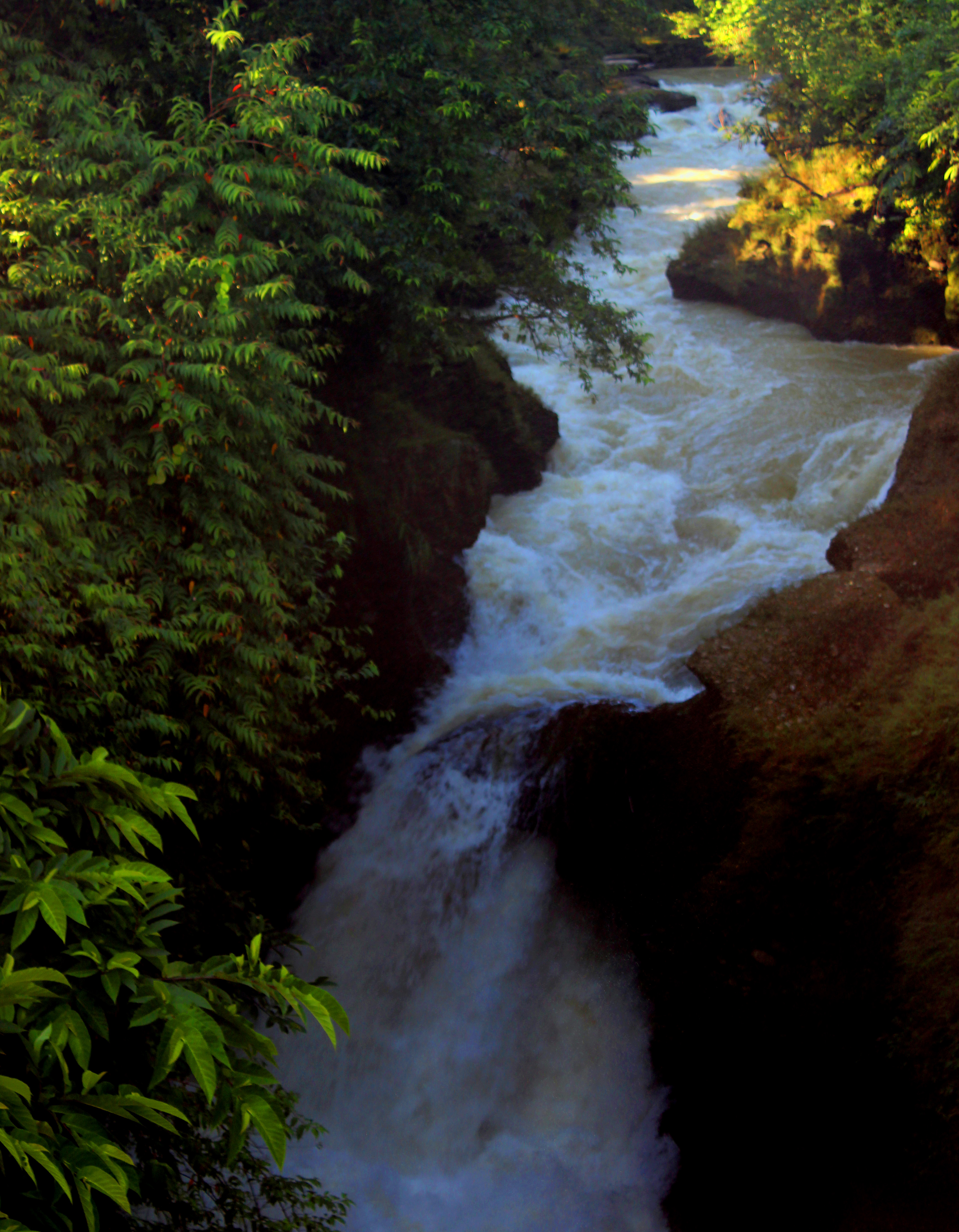
Davis Fall in full flow

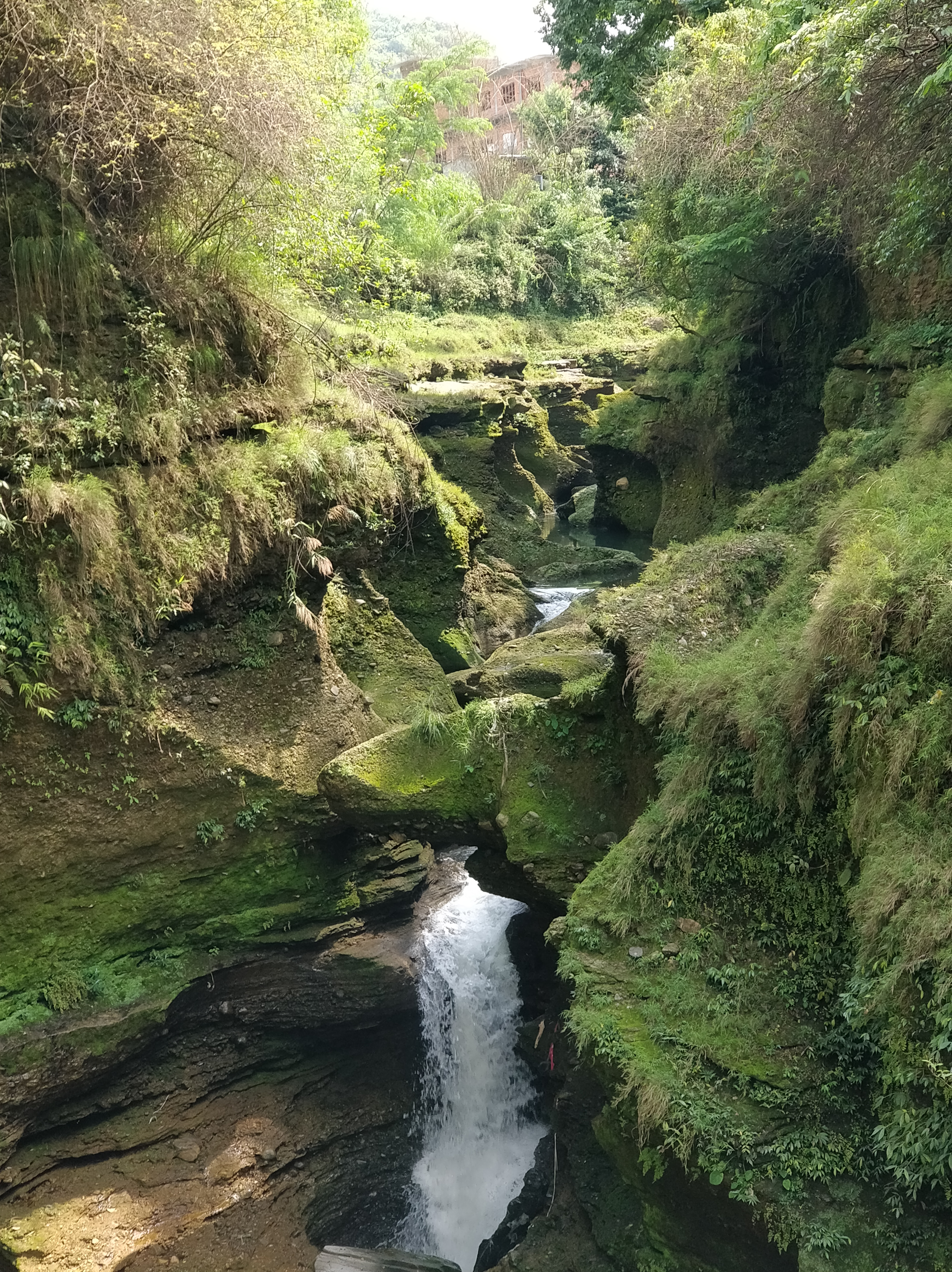
Davis Fall in full flow

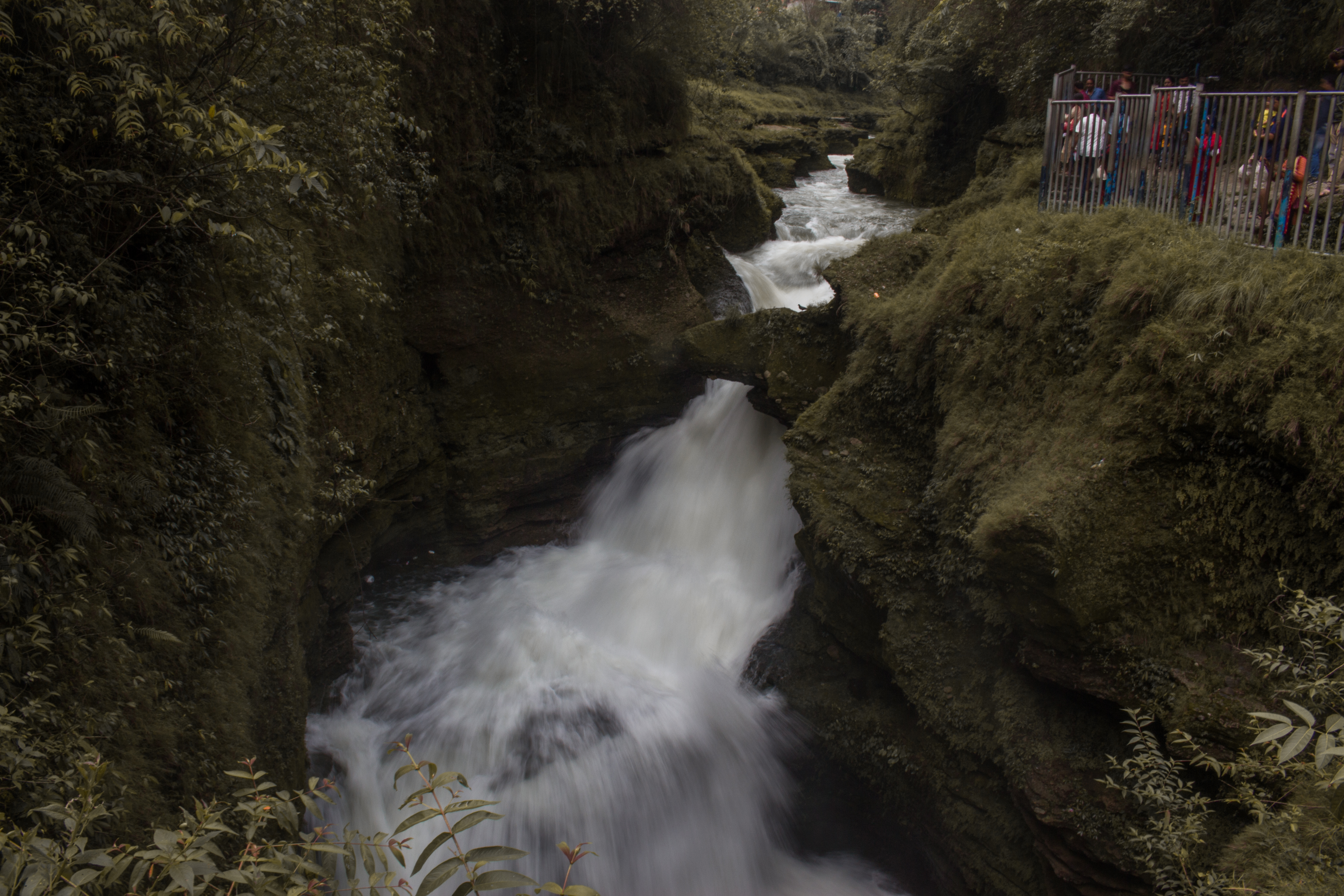
Davis Fall in full flow

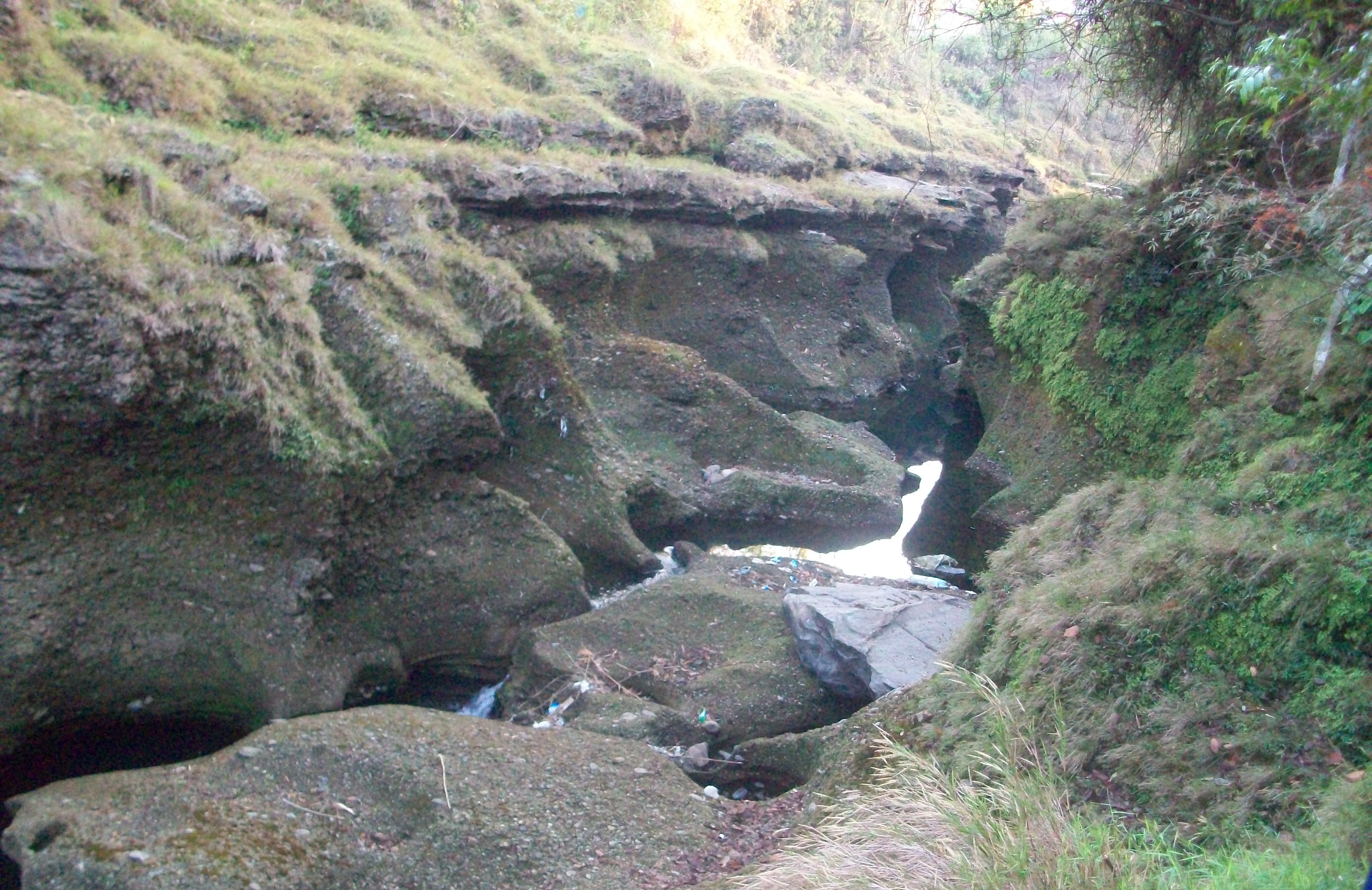
Davis Fall in full flow

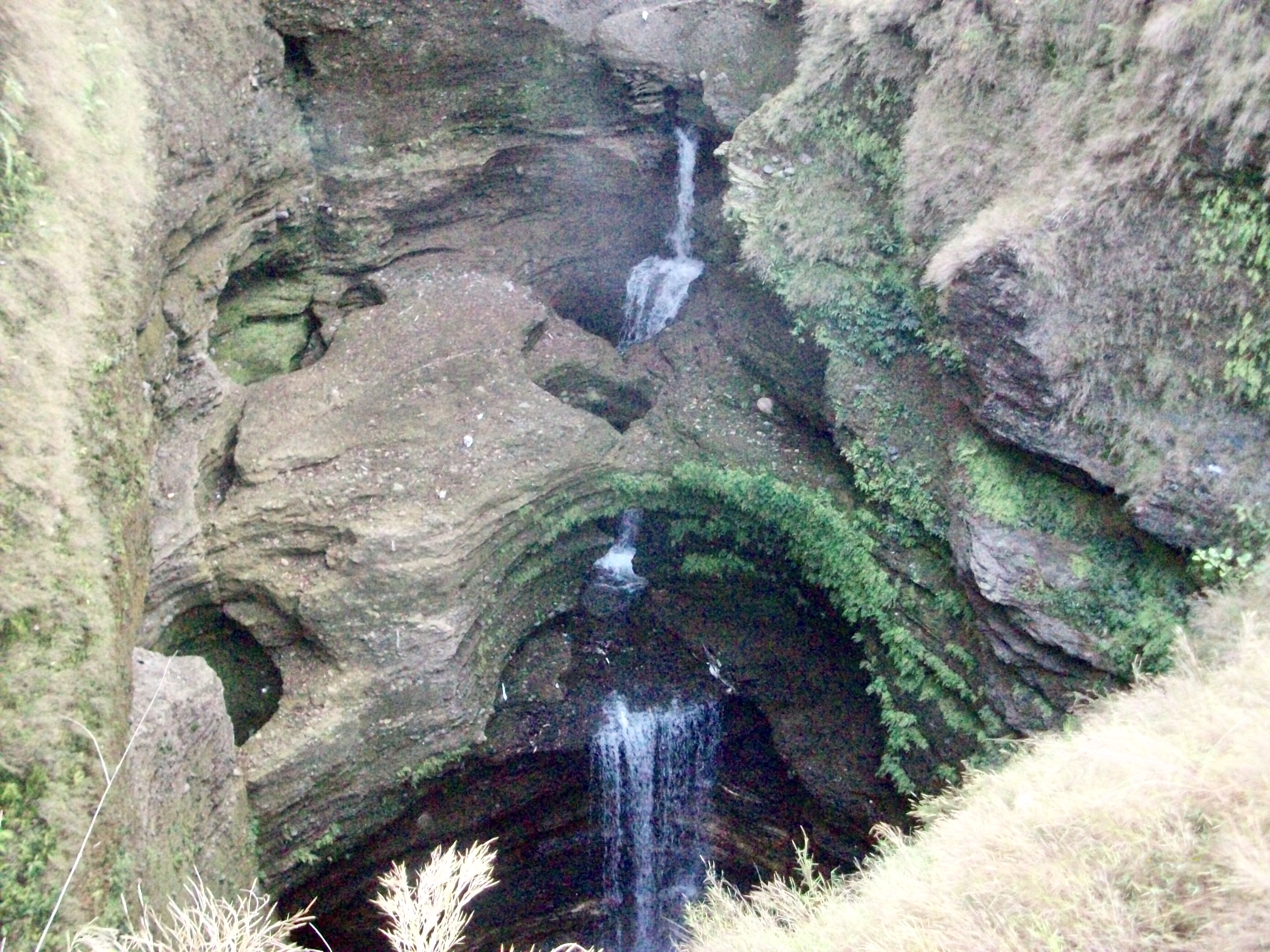
Davis Fall in full flow

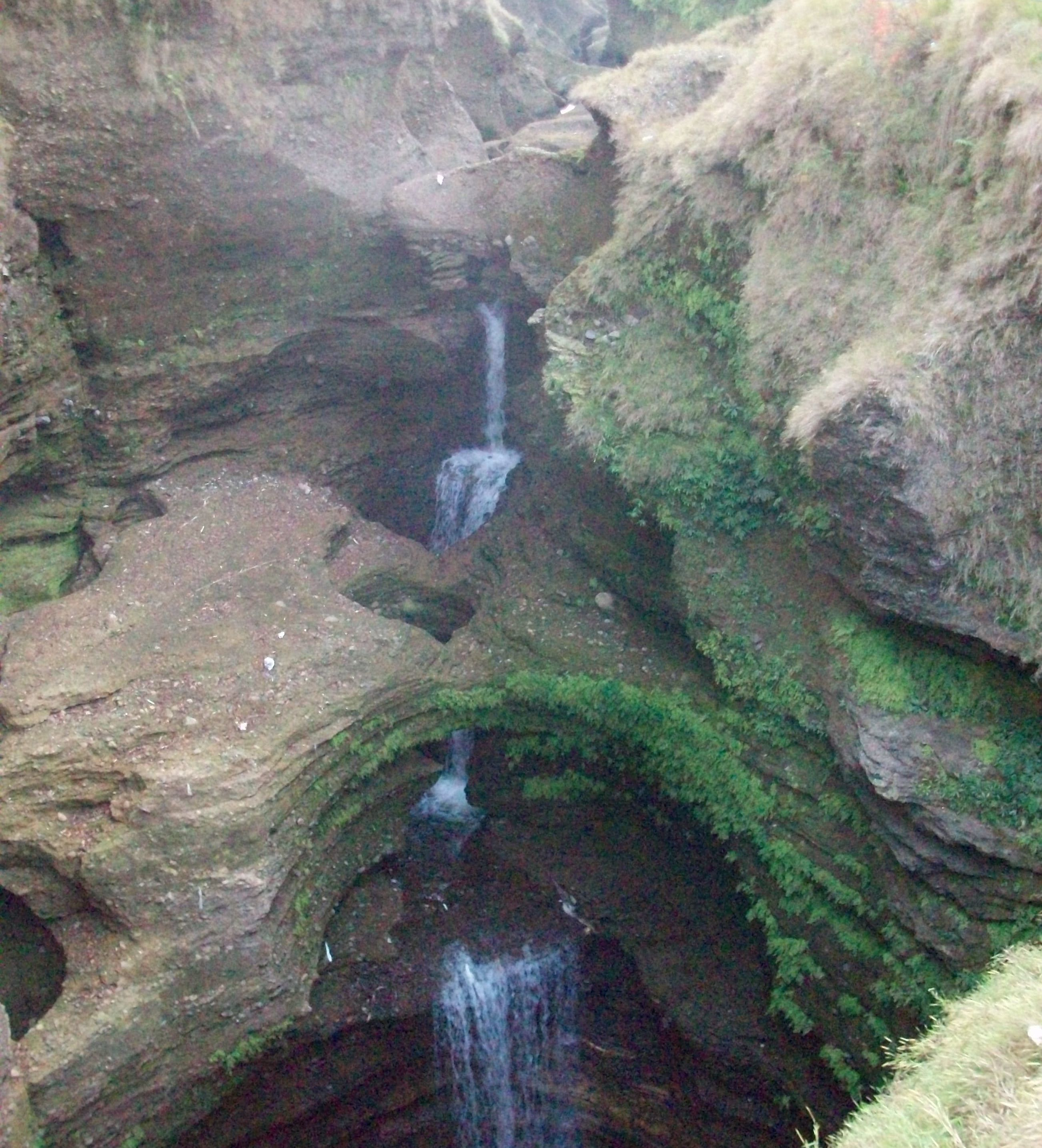
Davis Fall in full flow

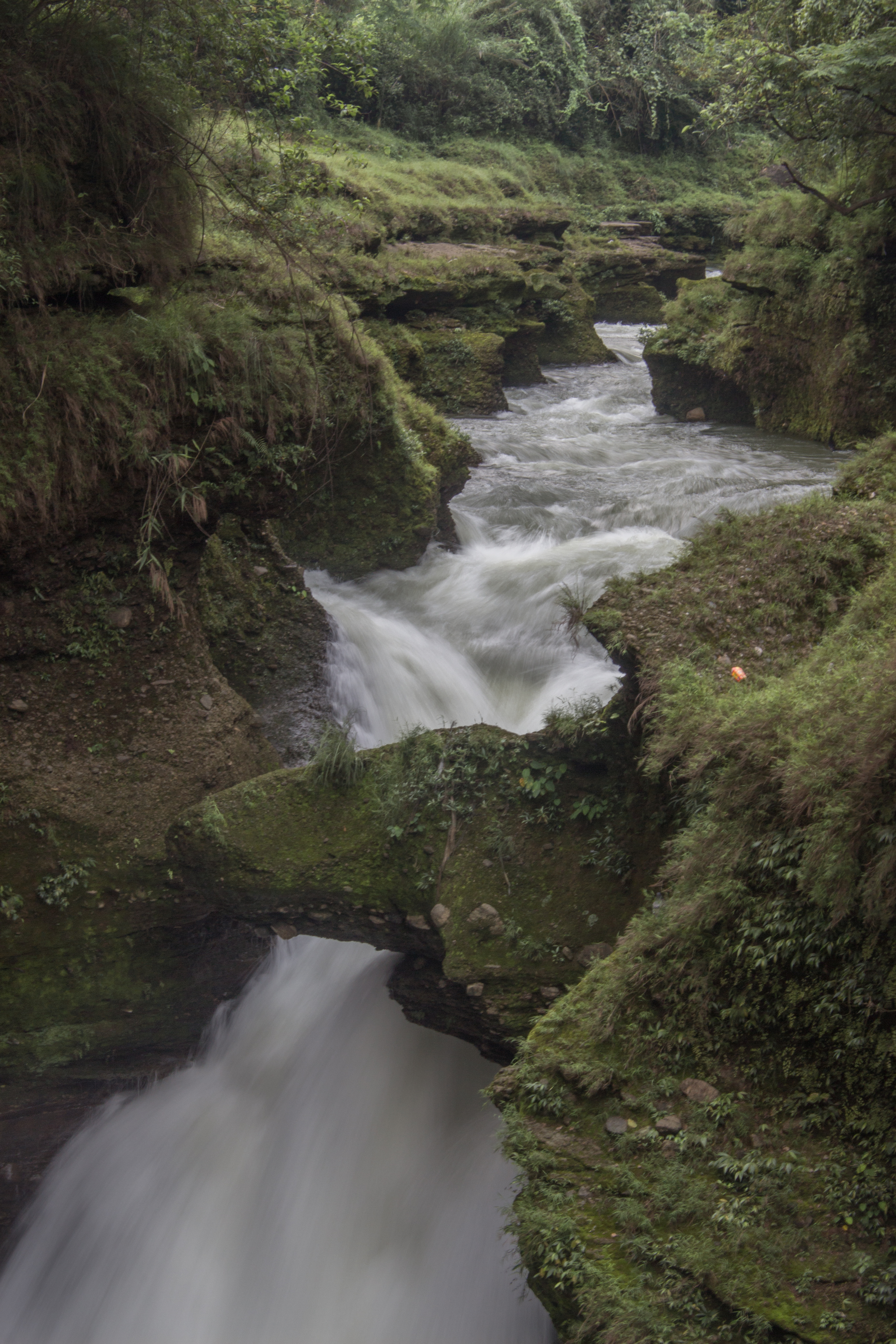
Davis Fall in full flow

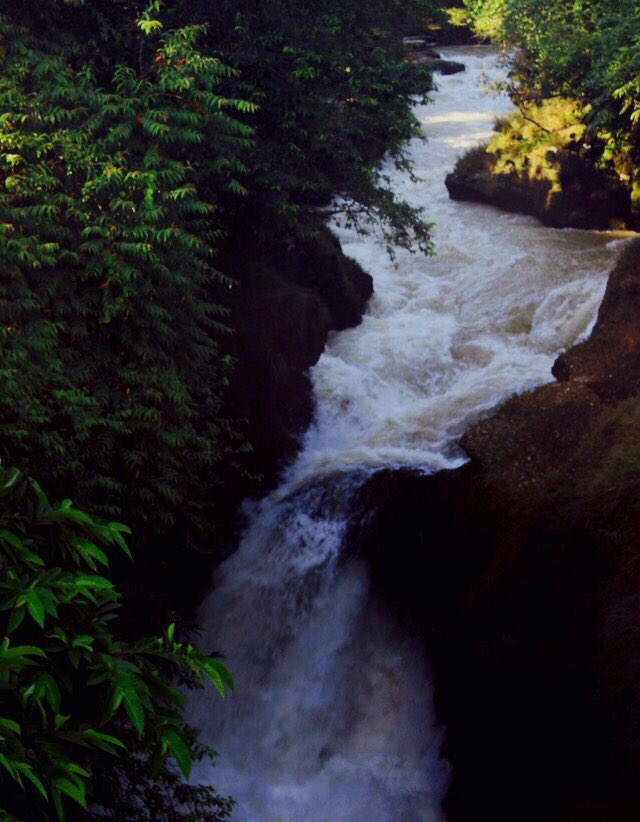

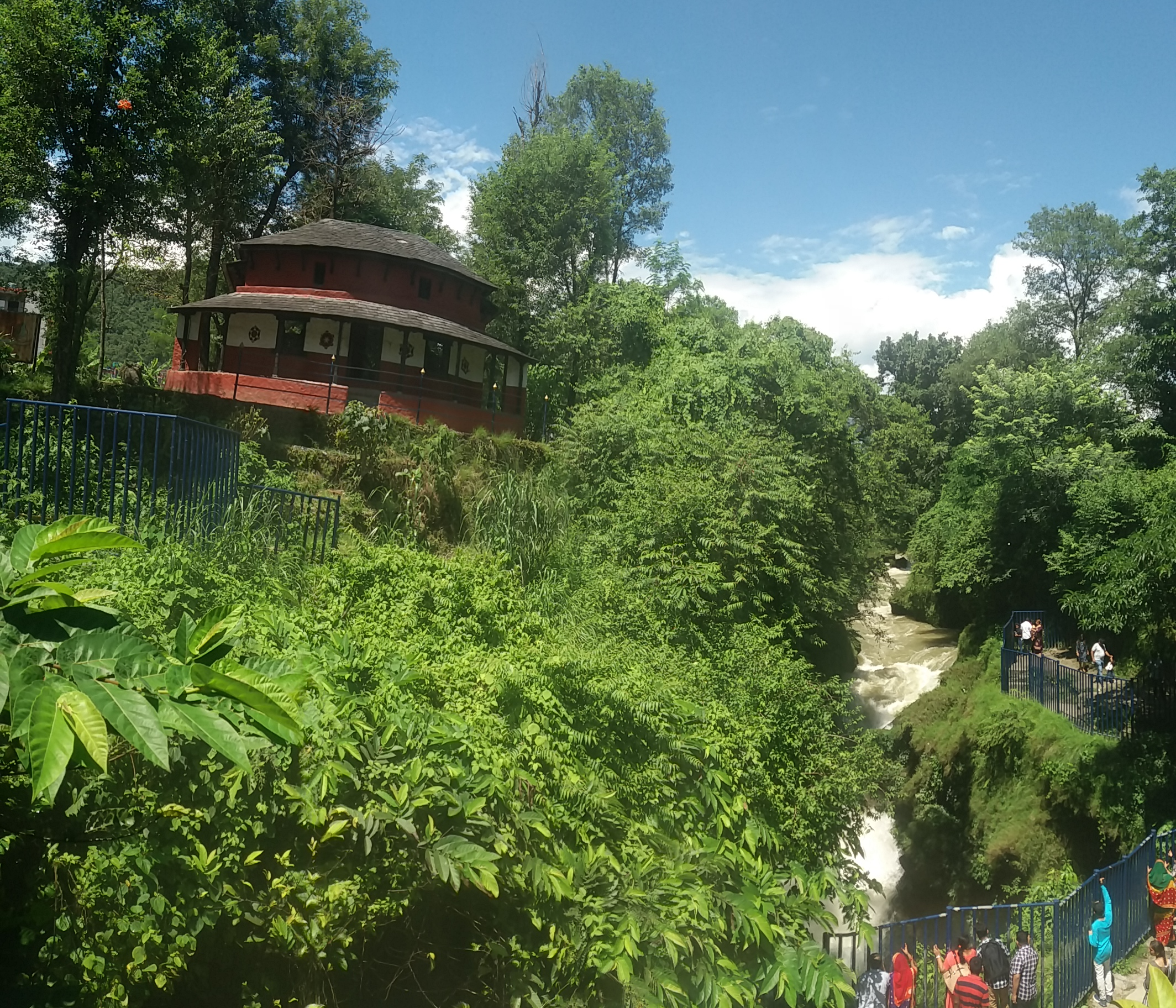

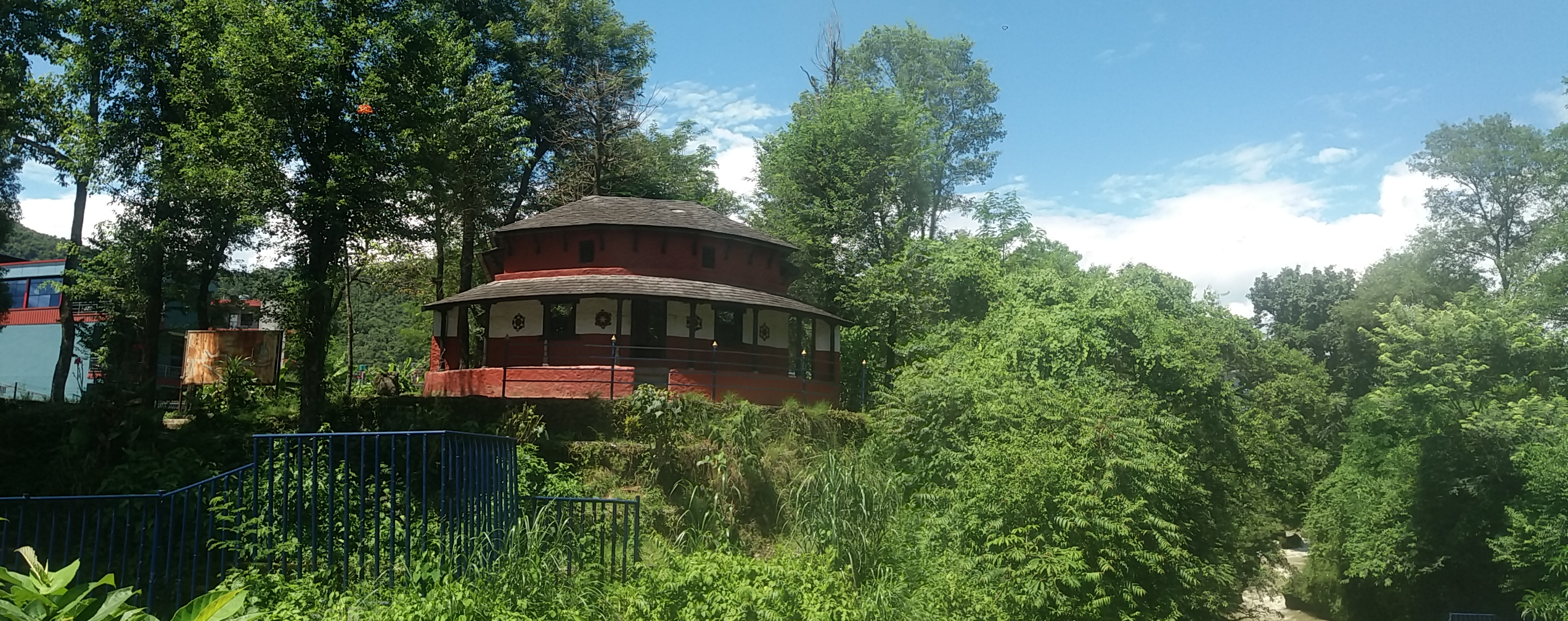

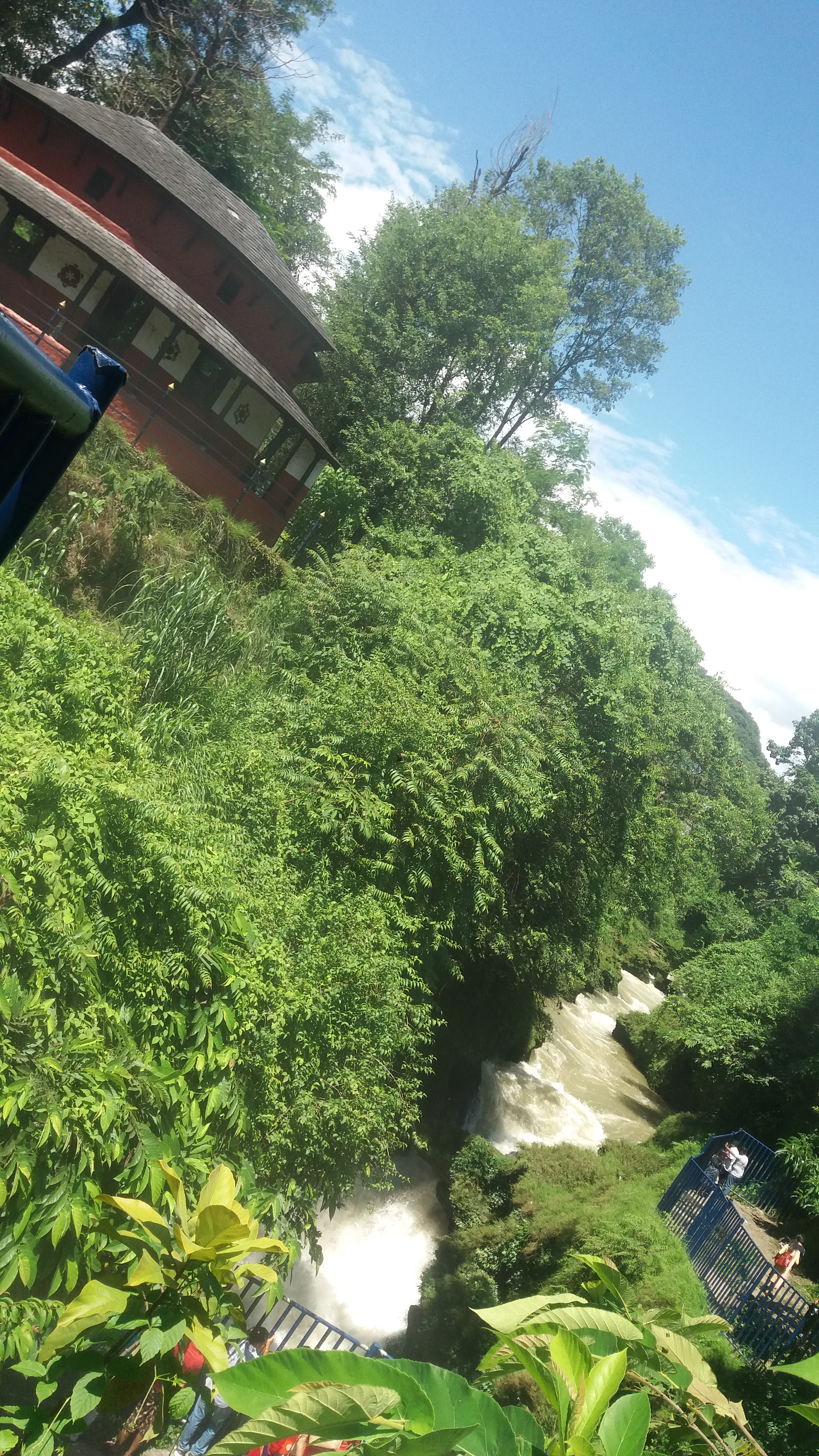

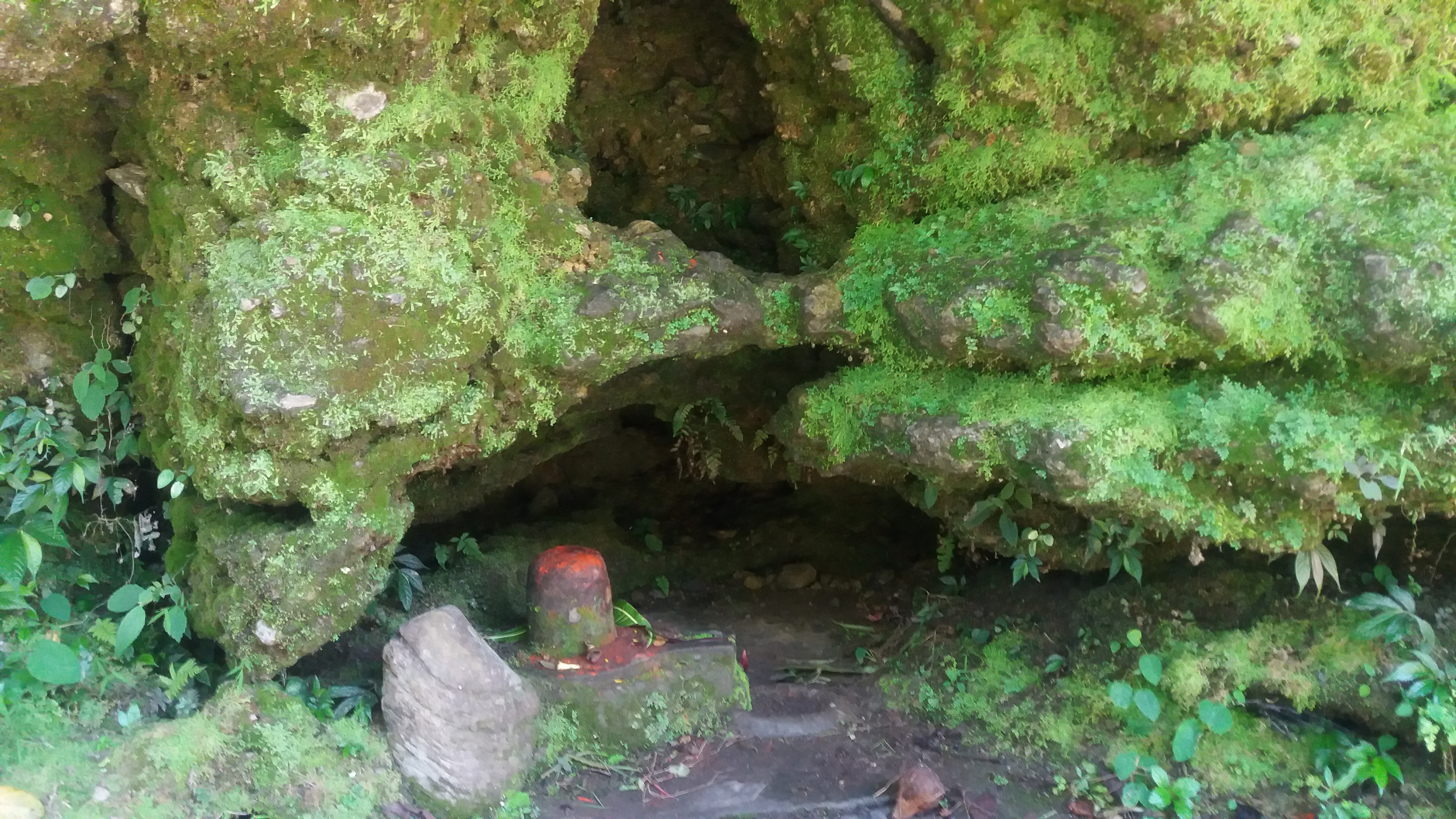

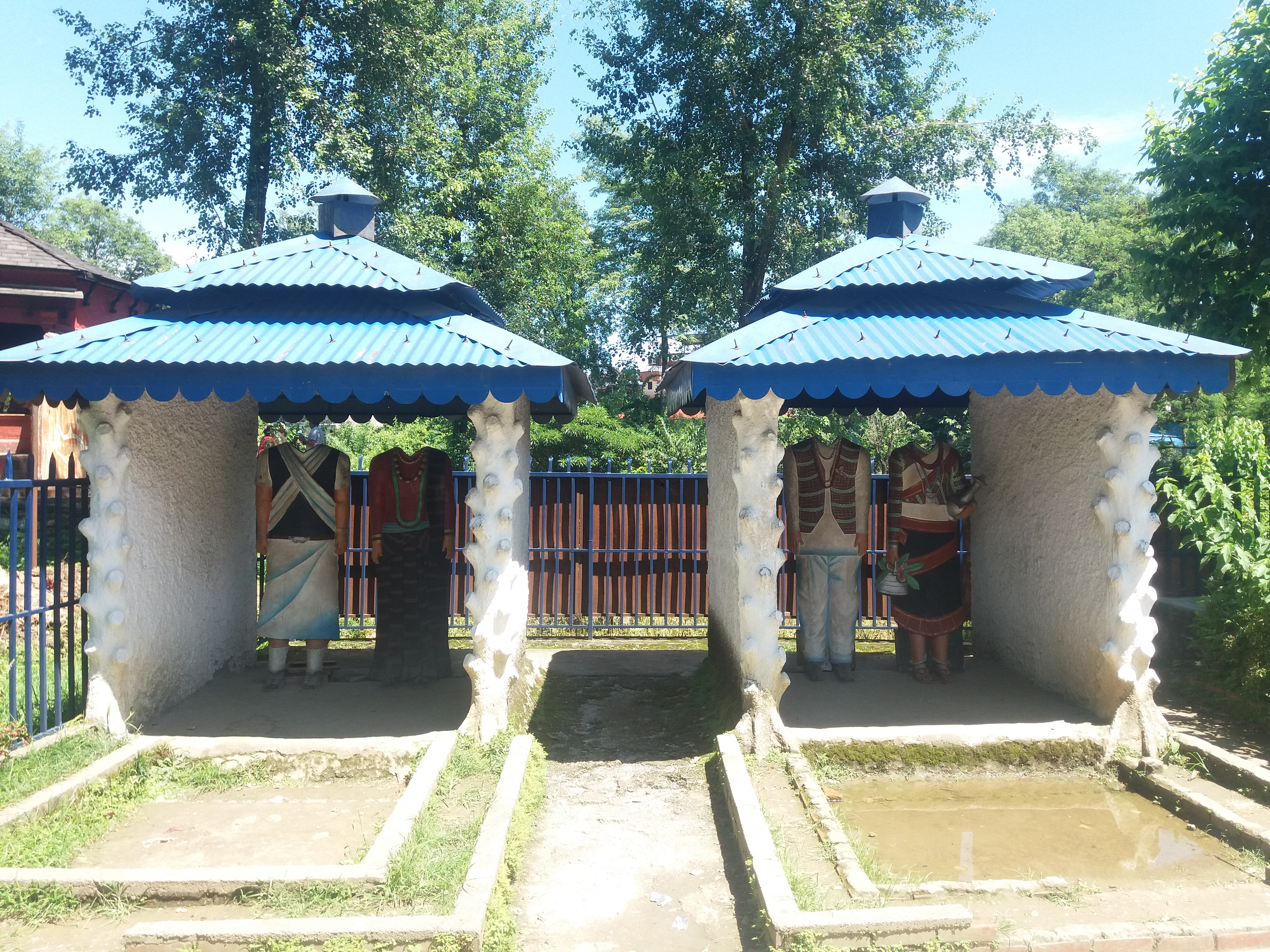

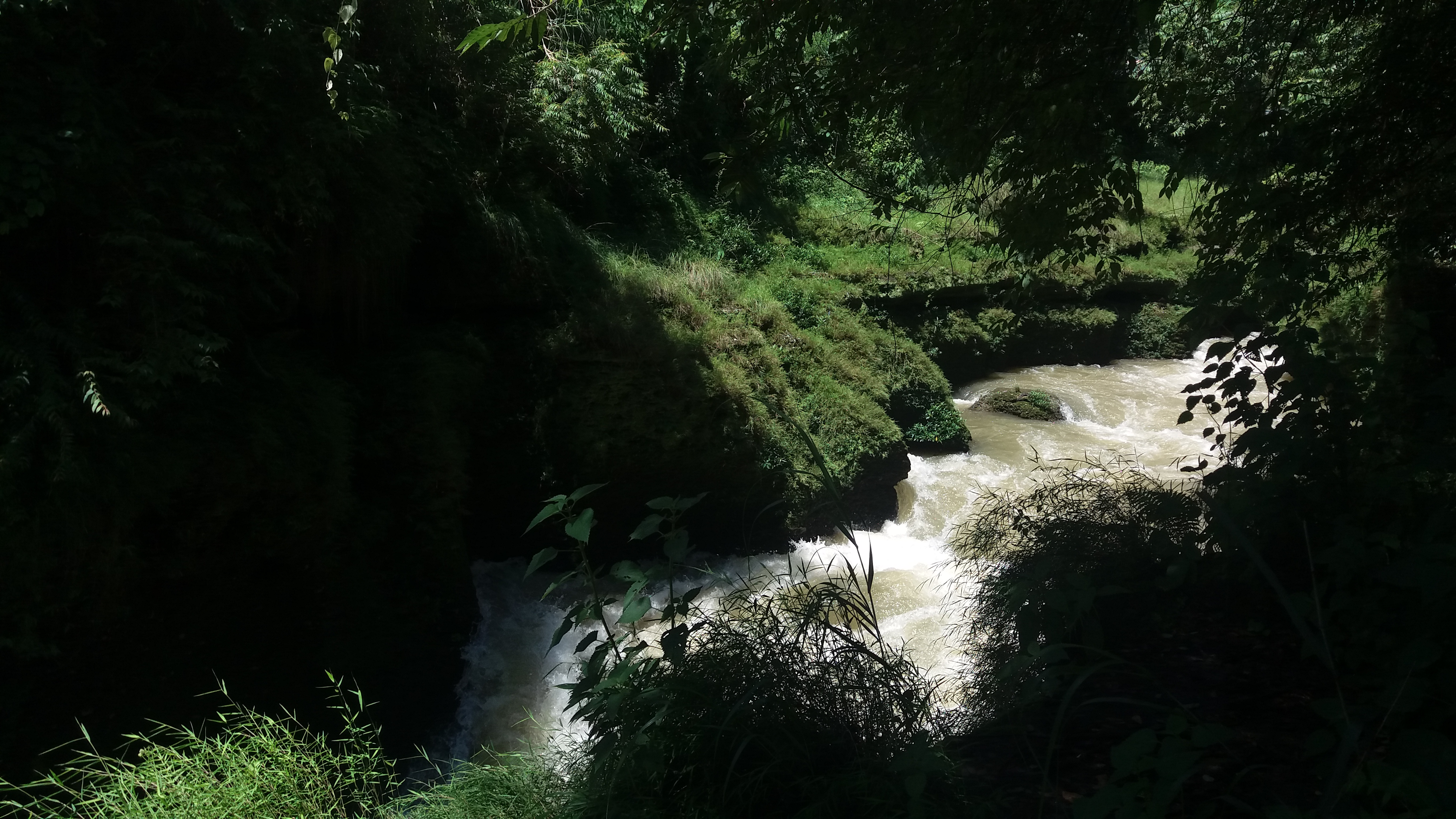

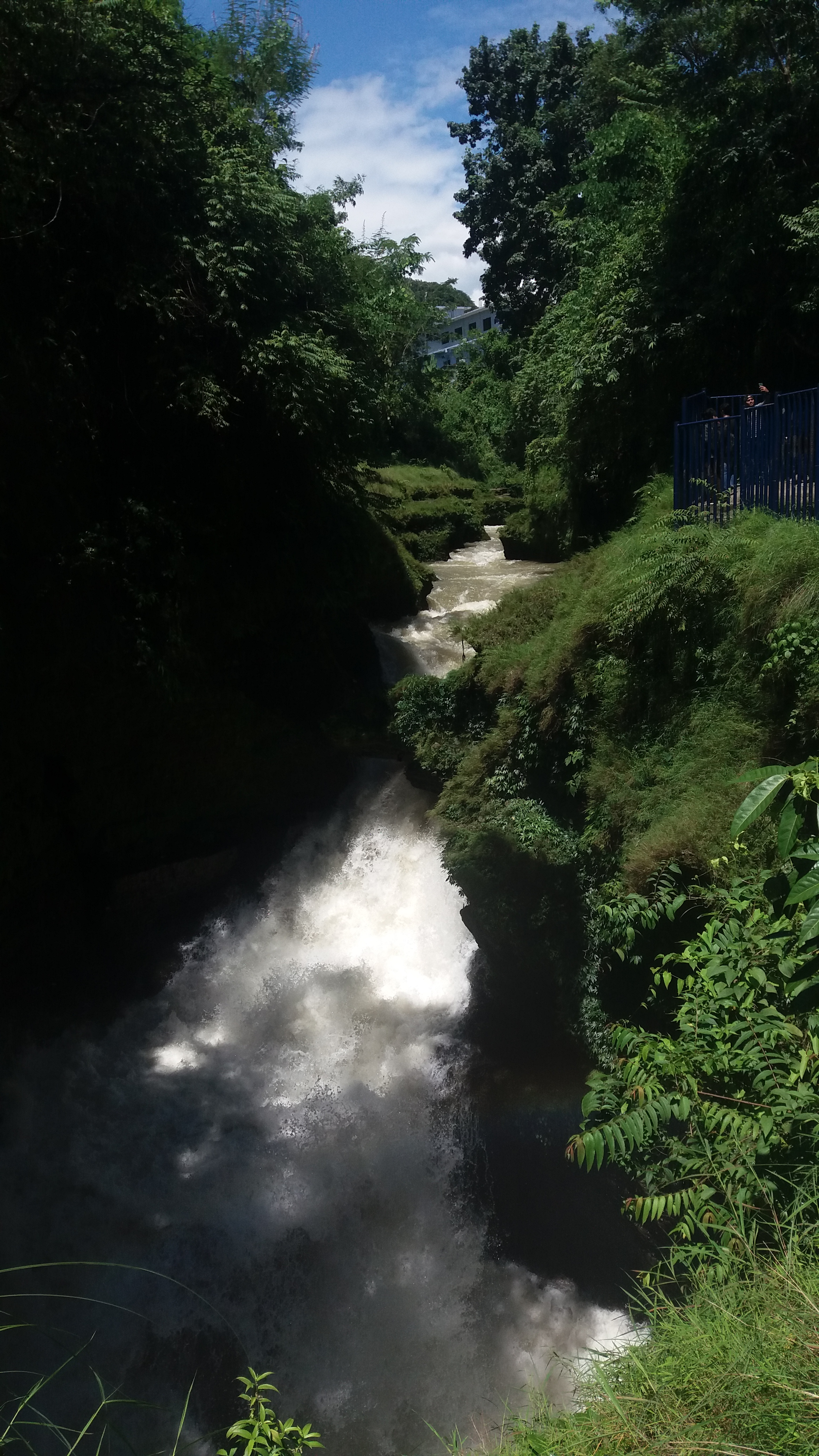

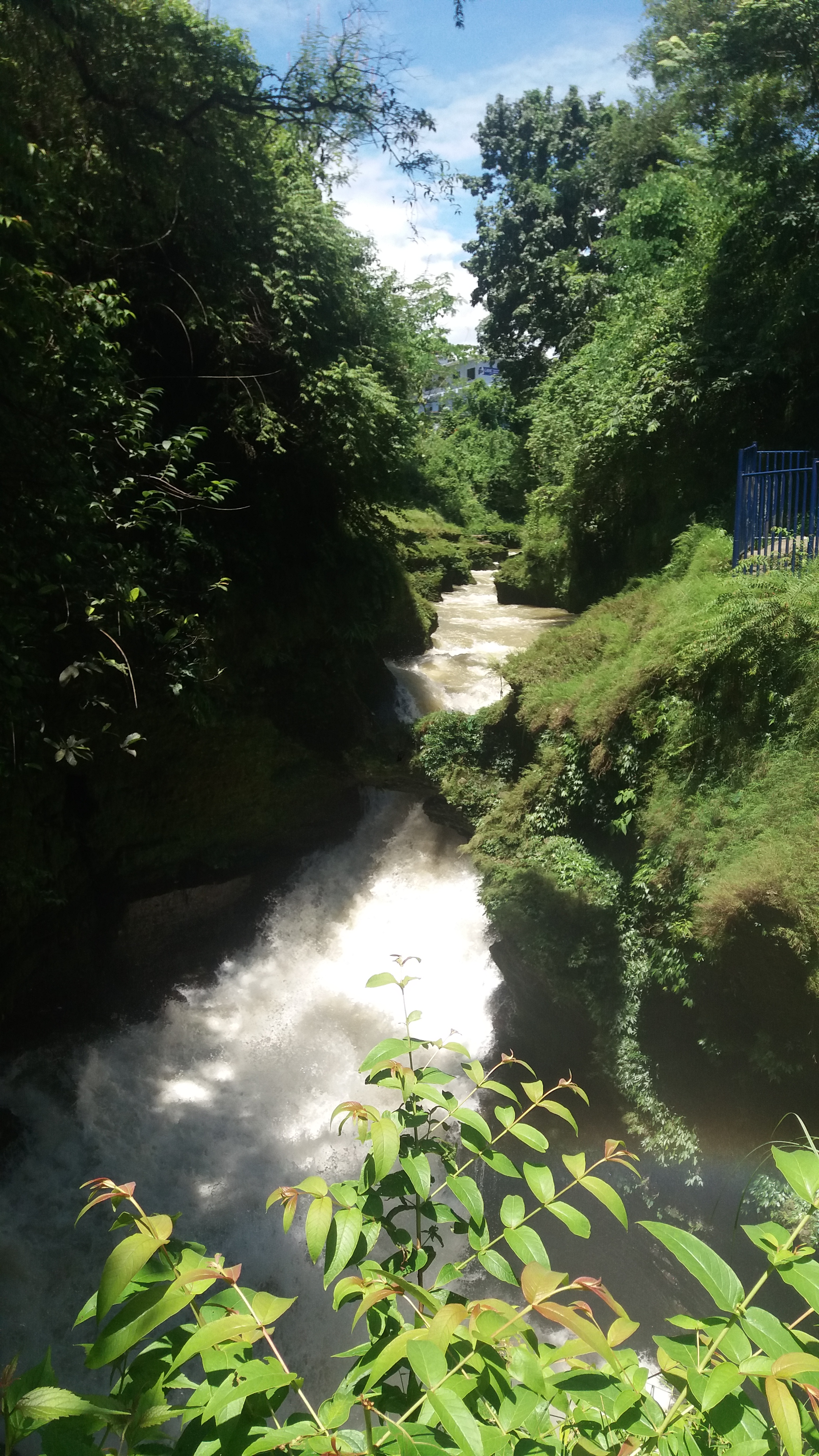

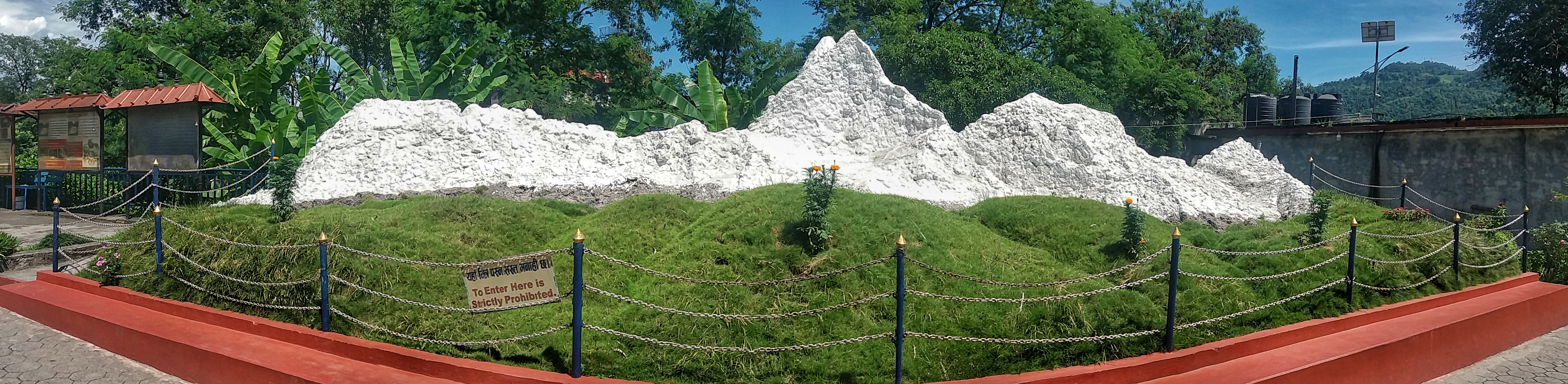

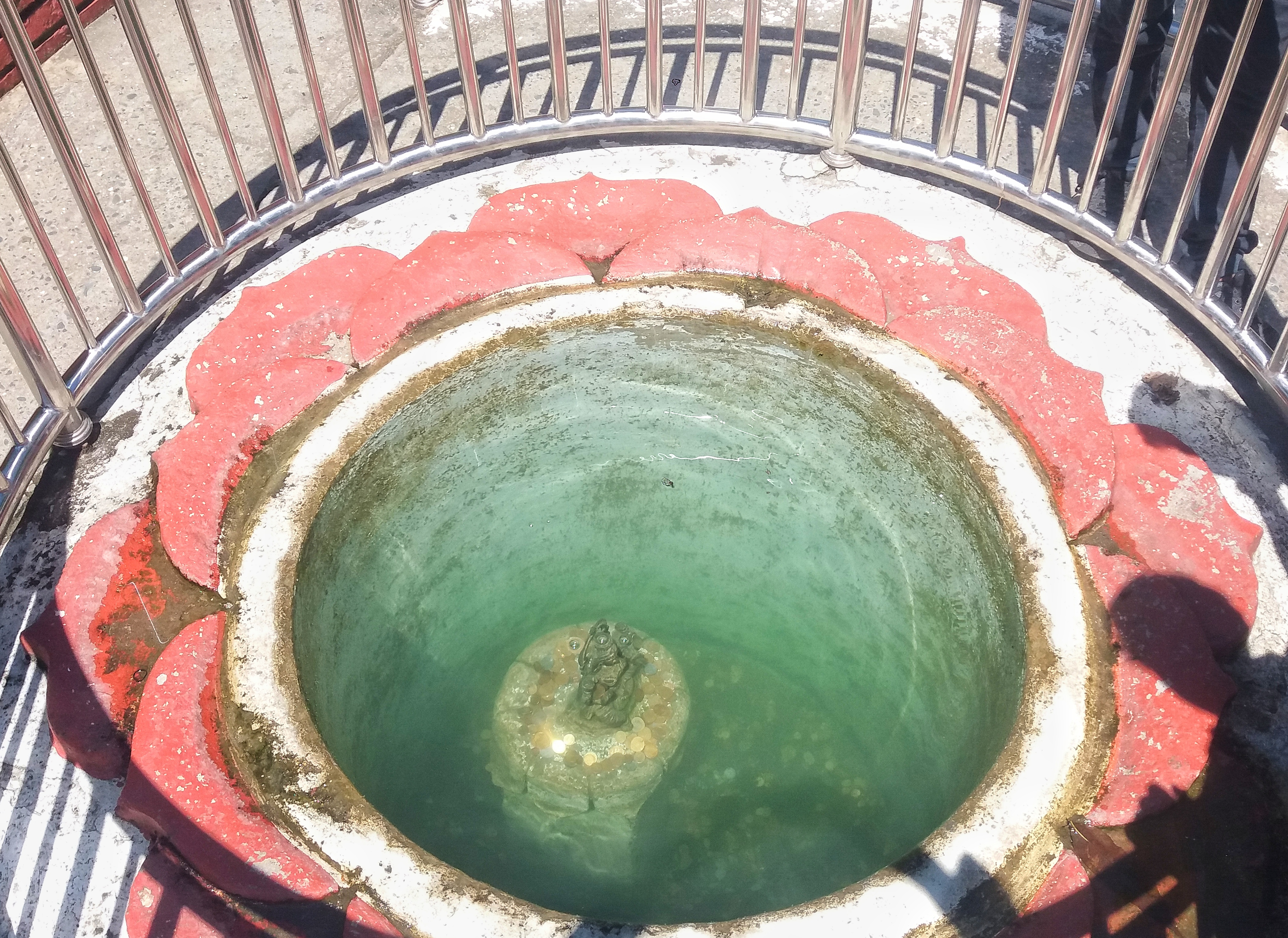

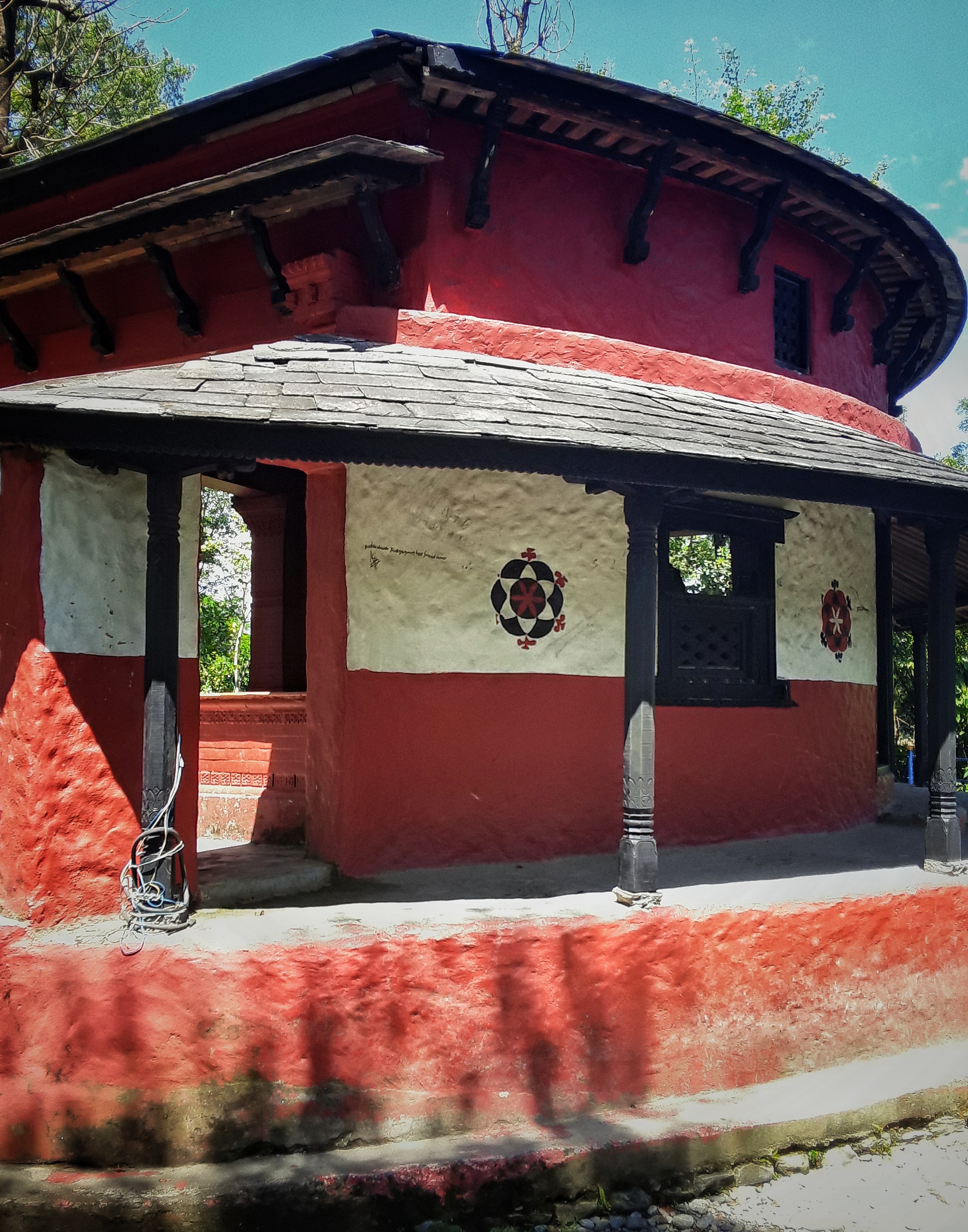

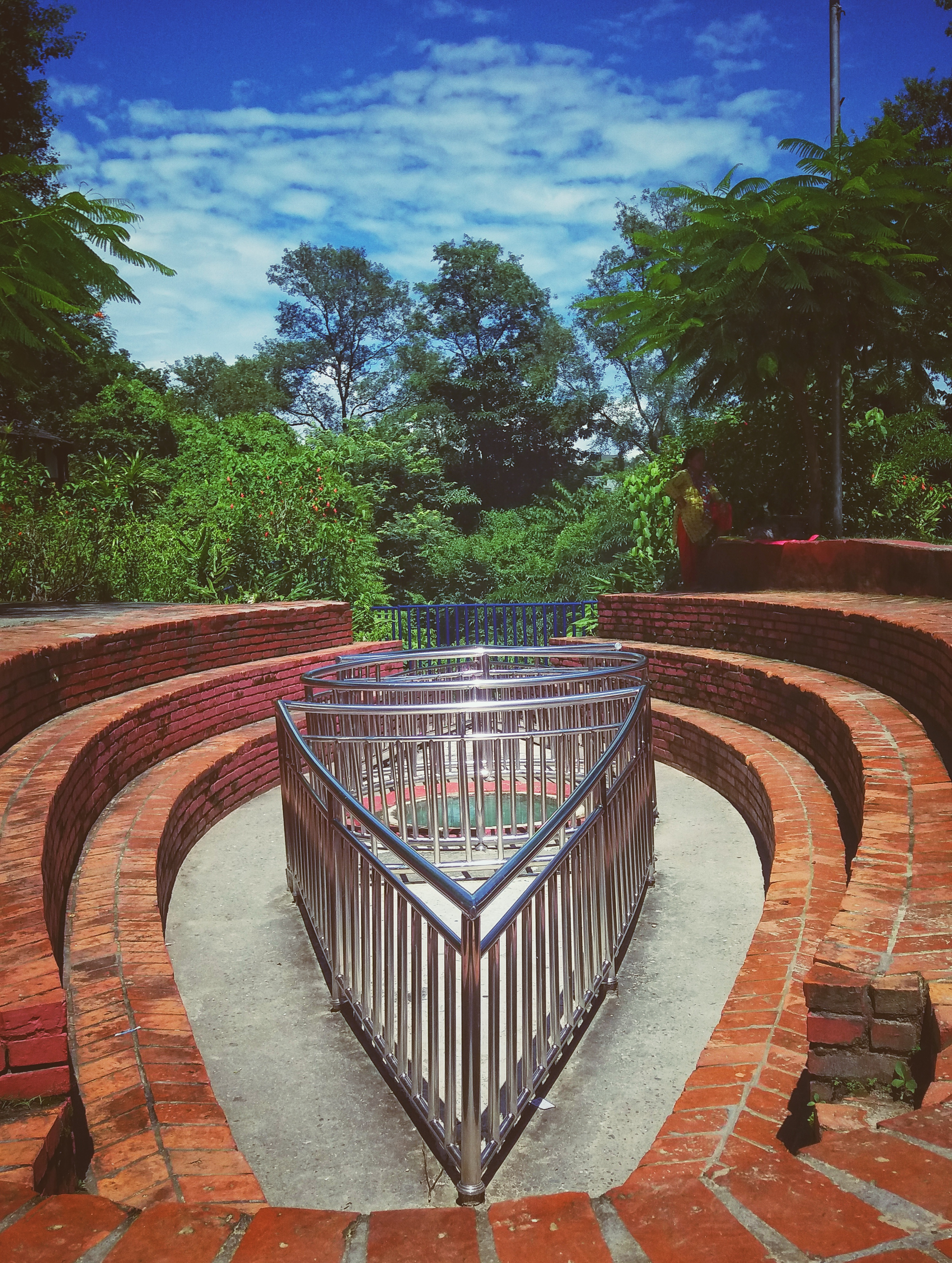

== See also ==
- List of waterfalls
- List of waterfalls of Nepal
