= Gupteshwor Mahadev Cave =

Cave in Nepal

- गुप्तेश्वर महादेव गुफा
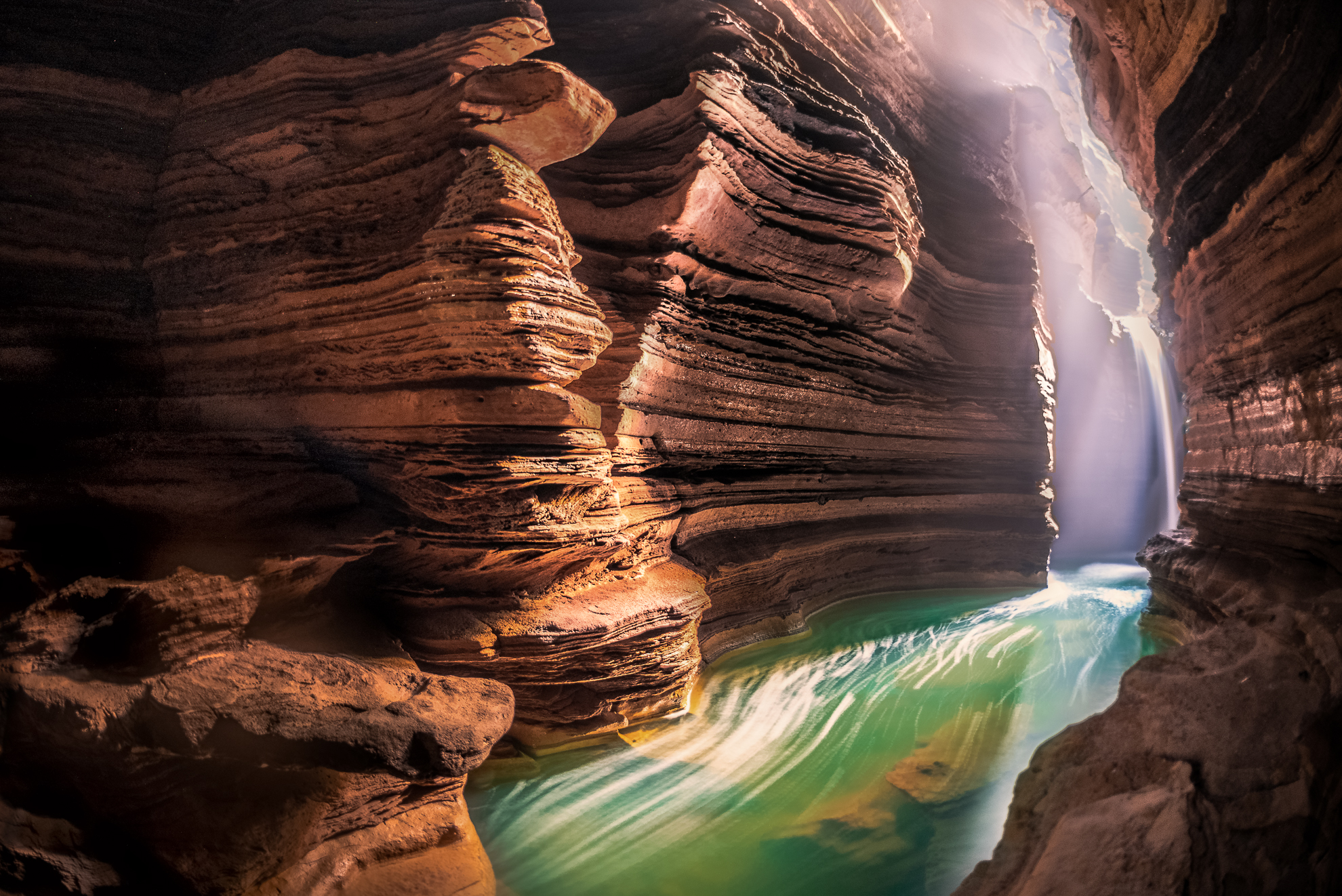
- Gupteshwor Mahadev Cave

- Location within Gandaki Province
- Location: Chhorepatan, Pokhara, Nepal
- Coordinates: 28°11′22″N 83°57′28″E
- Length: 2,057 m (6,749 ft)
- Entrances: 1
- Website: https://gupteshworcave.com.np/

Gupteshwor Mahadev Cave (Nepali गुप्तेश्वर महादेव गुफा) is a cave located in Pokhara-17, Chhorepatan, Kaski district, opposite to Davis Fall, the water from Davis fall passes through this cave. Gupteshwor Mahadev cave is one of the major attractions of Pokhara. Pokhara, Nepal.

The cave was first surveyed by Tony Waltham and colleagues who travelled overland to India and Nepal as part of the British Karst Research Expedition to the Himalaya although they erroneously called this the Harpan River Cave whereas the river that drains the Phewa Tal flows through the cave is the Pardi Khola. In 1976 a second British scientific expedition visited the cave to catalogue the animals living inside. These include Great Himalayan leaf-nosed bats, Hipposideros armiger, fruit bats Rousettus leschenaultia and minute collembola Troglopedetes nepalensis and Sinella sp.

The cave is one of the best places to visit in Pokhara, Nepal.

== Gallery ==
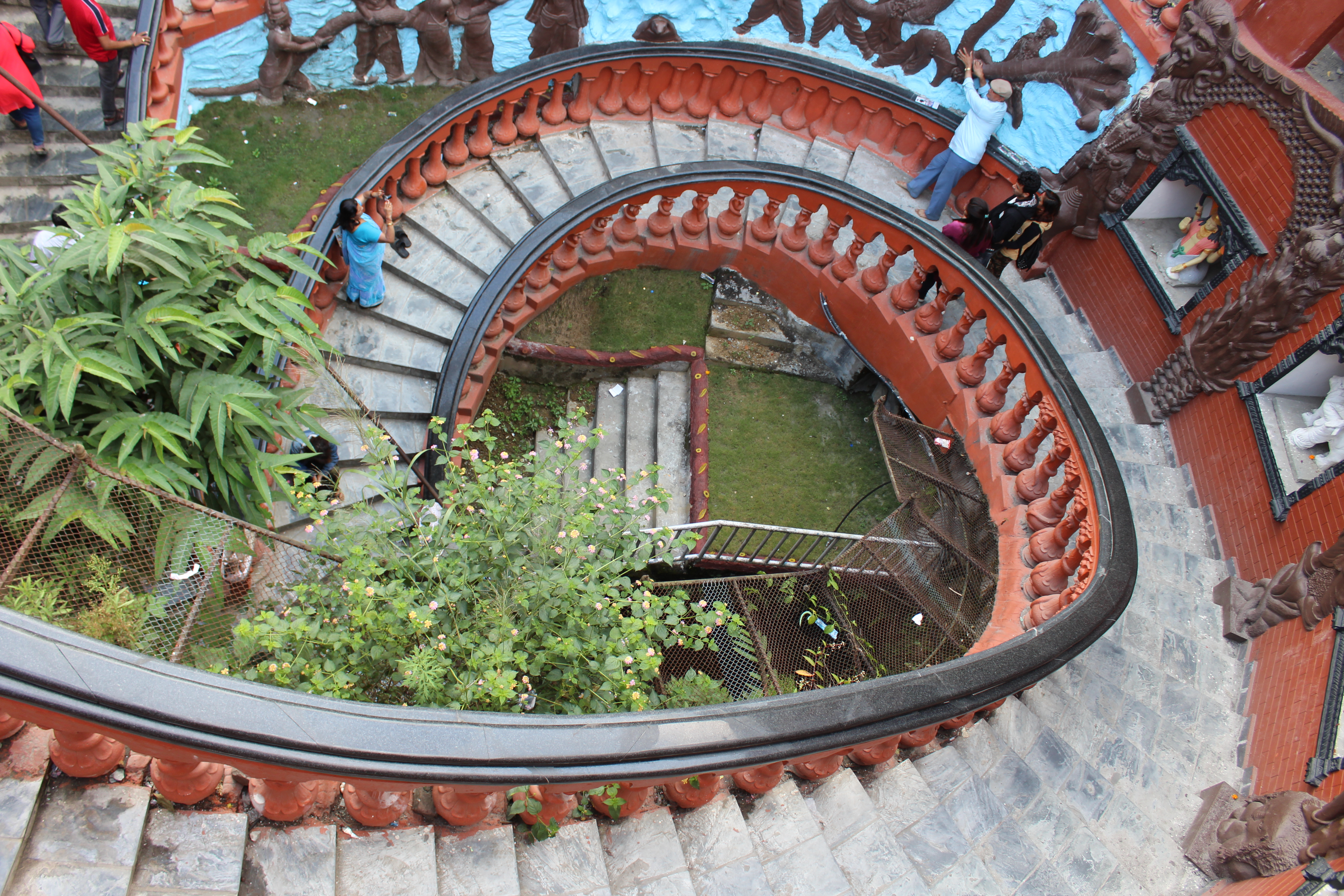

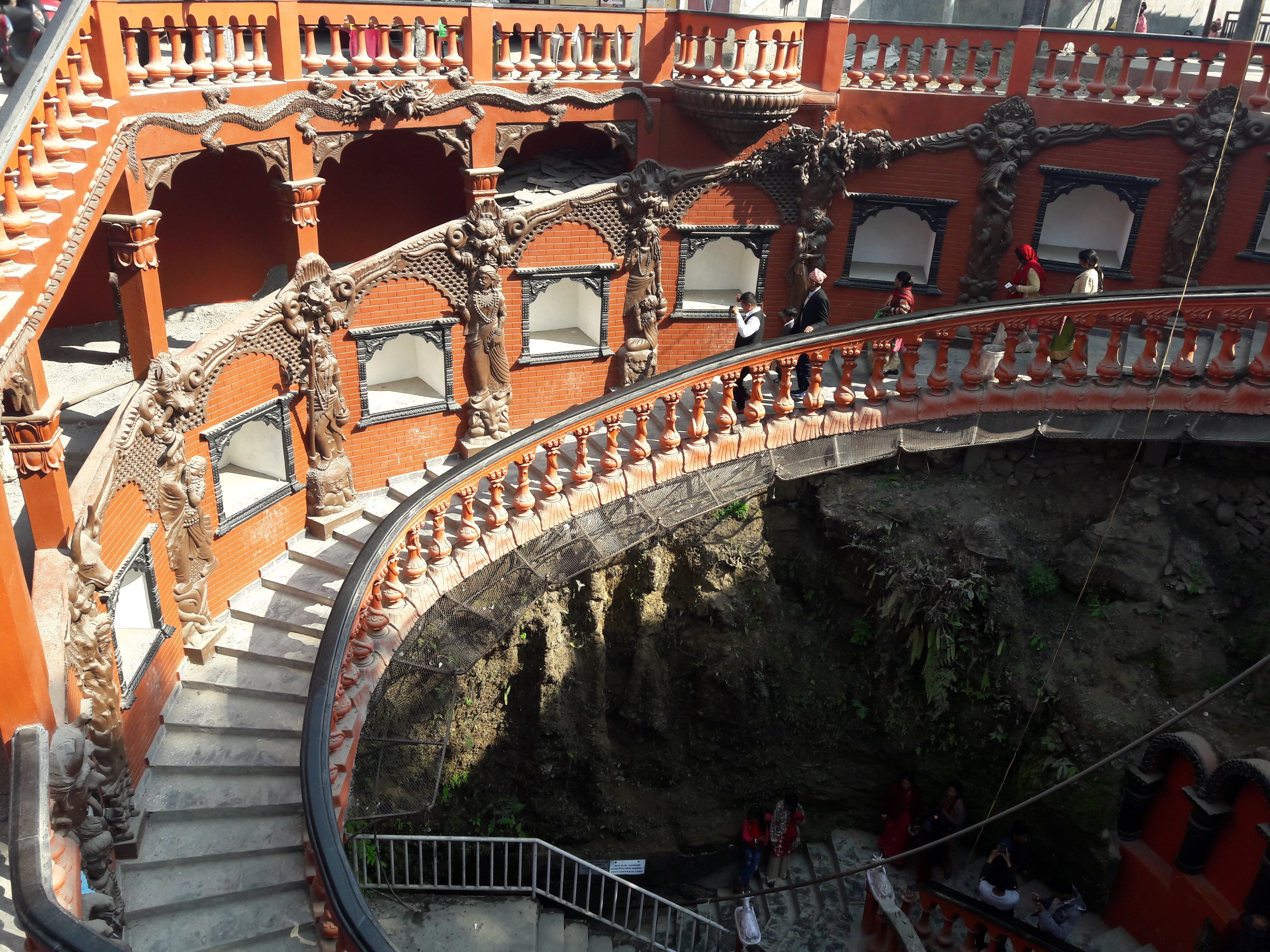

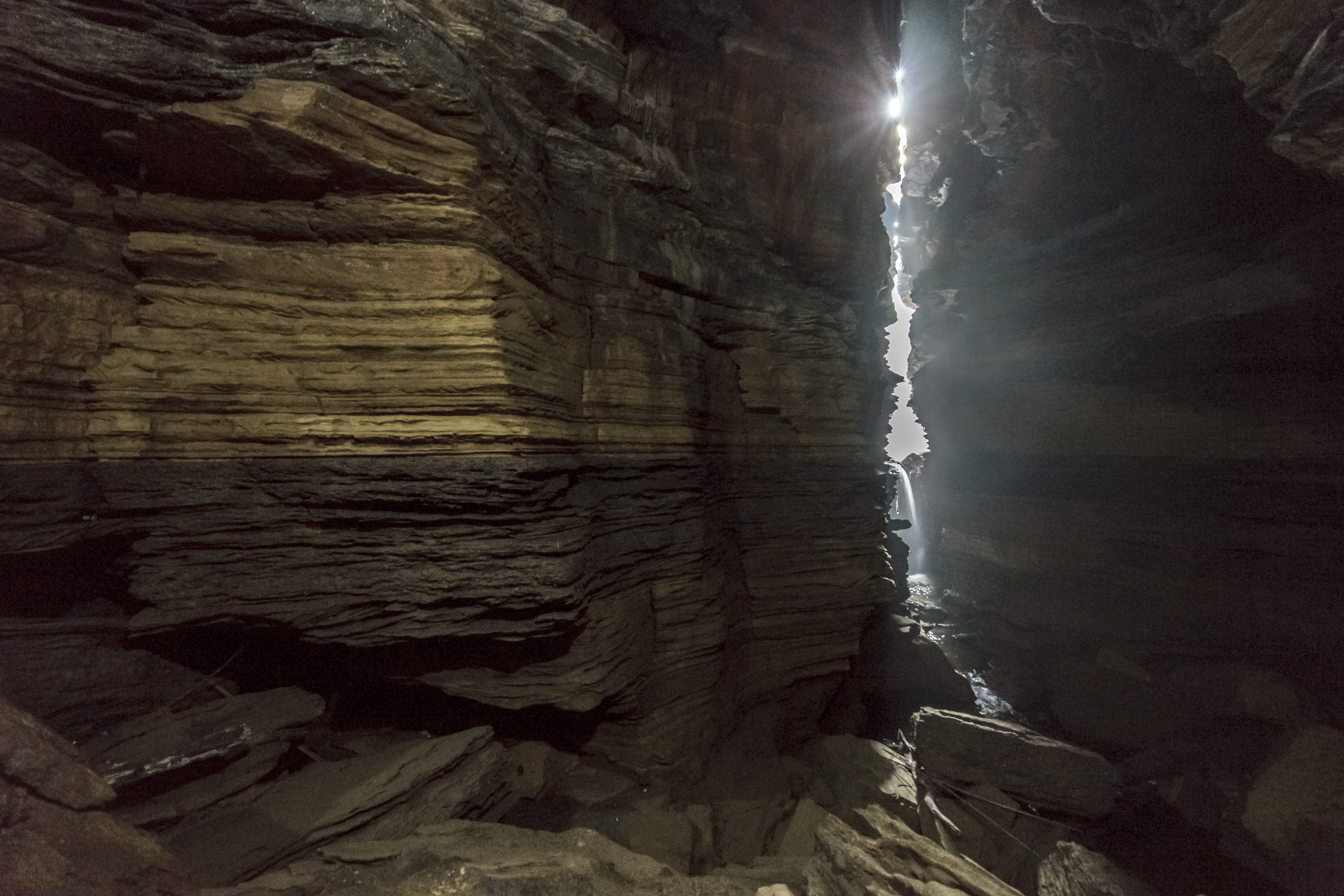

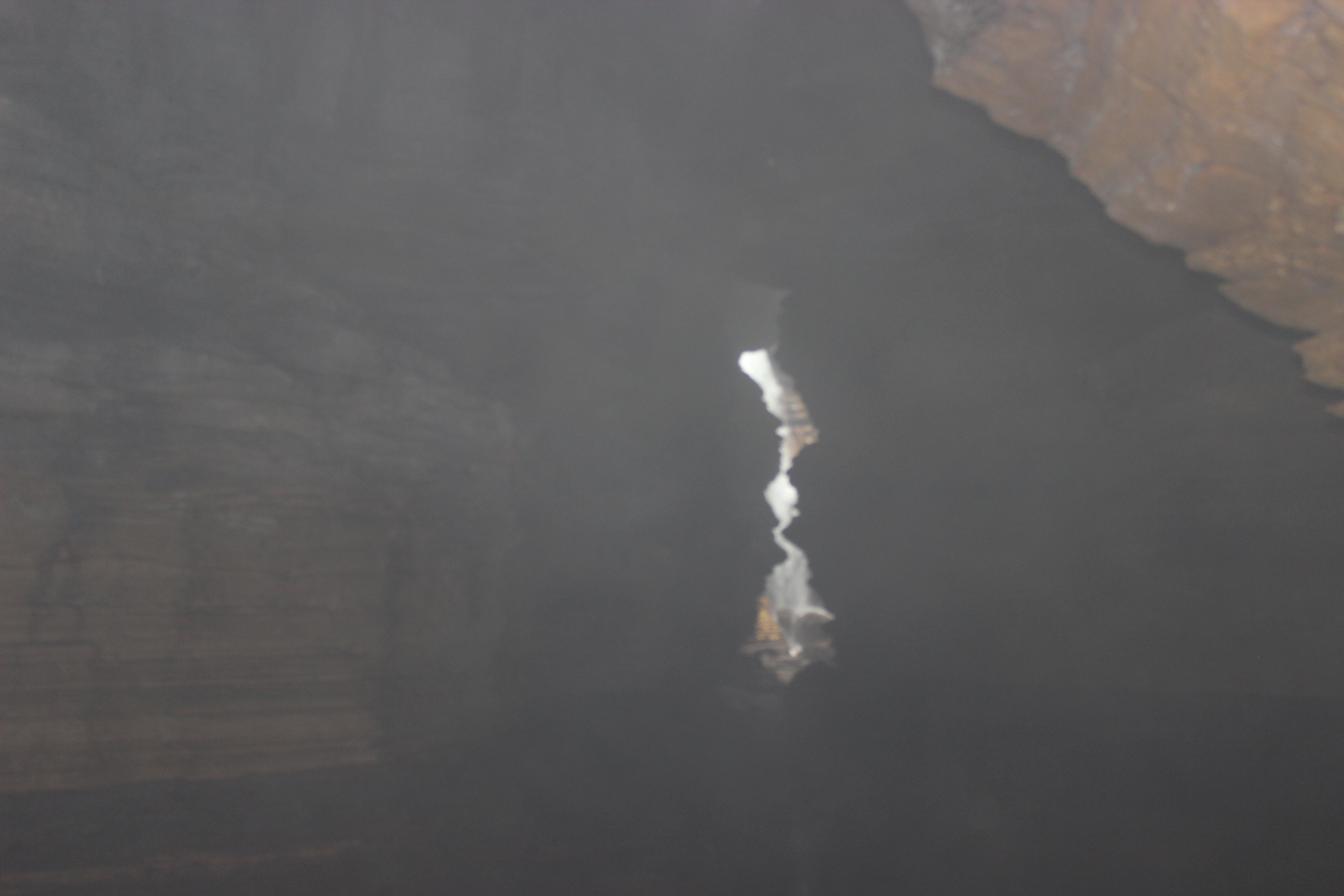

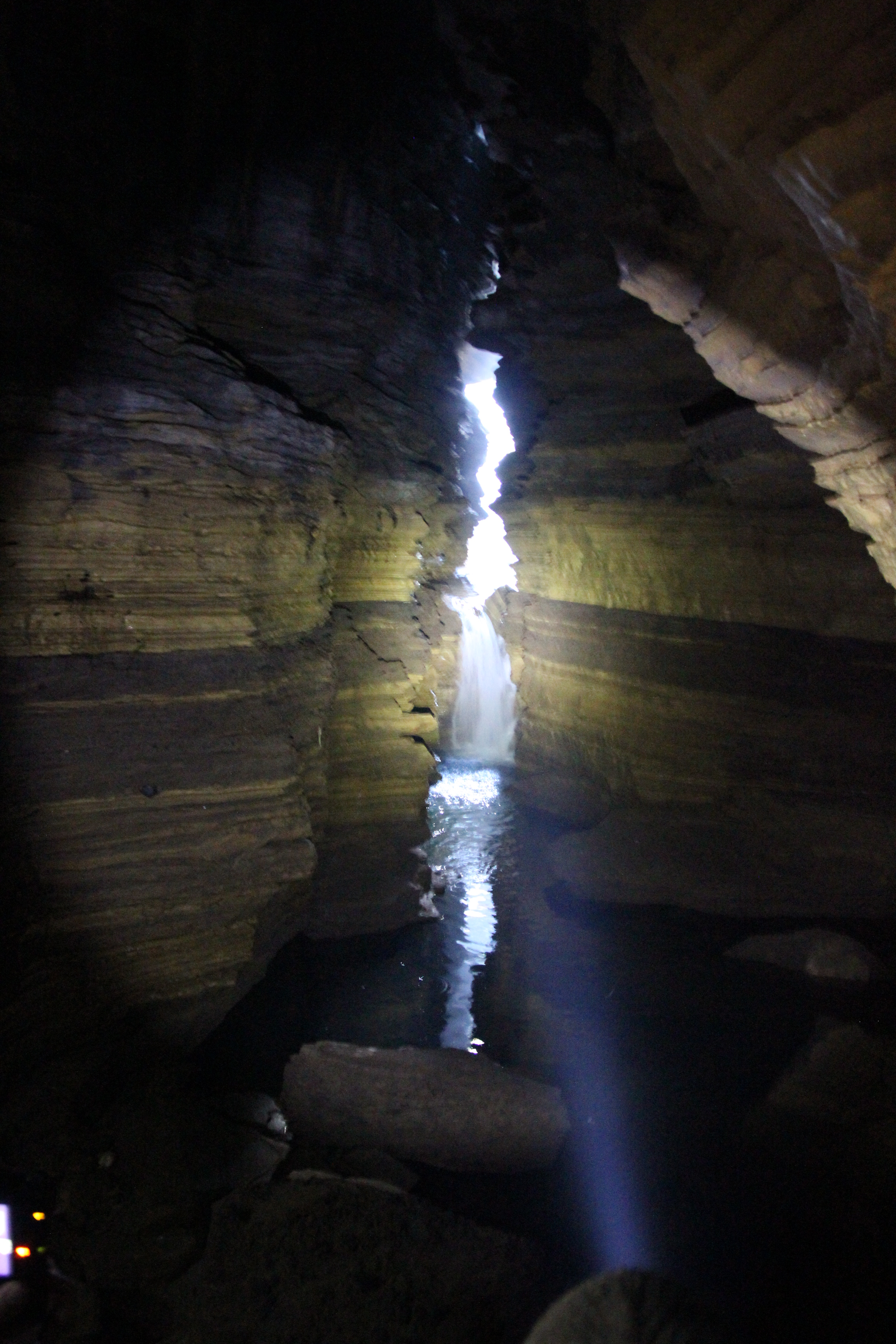
