= Tenaru Falls =

Waterfall in the rainforest of Guadalcanal, Solomon Islands

Coordinates: 9°45′S 160°0′E

Tenaru Falls is a waterfall in the rainforest of Guadalcanal, Solomon Islands. With a height of 63 meters and pouring into the Chea River, the falls are about two kilometers from a small village.

== See also ==
- List of waterfalls
