= Driva, Trøndelag =

Village in Oppdal Municipality, Norway

Driva
- Village
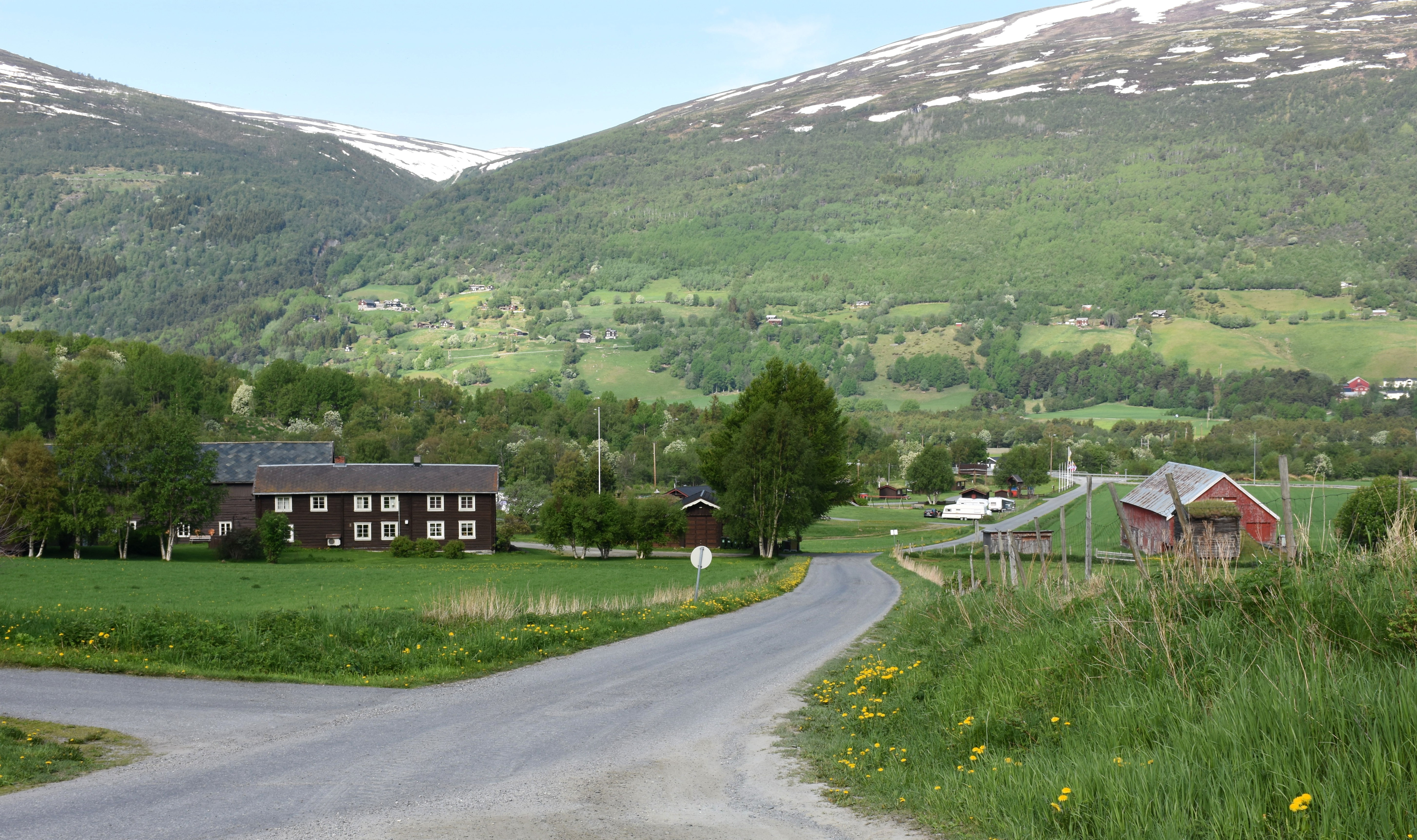
- View of the village
- Interactive map of Driva
- Location within Trøndelag Location within Norway
- Coordinates: 62.53333°N 9.63227°E
- Country: Norway
- Region: Central Norway
- County: Trøndelag
- District: Dovre
- Municipality: Oppdal Municipality
- Elevation: 555 m (1,821 ft)
- Time zone: UTC+01:00 (CET)
  - Summer (DST): UTC+02:00 (CEST)
- Post Code: 7345 Drivdalen

Driva is a village in Oppdal Municipality in Trøndelag county, Norway. It is located along the European route E6 highway and along the river Driva at the northern end of the Drivdalen valley. It is about 7.5 kilometres (4.7 mi) south of the municipal center of Oppdal and about 25 kilometres (16 mi) north of the small village of Kongsvoll.

The western part of the village is the site of the Holan farm, the Lo farm area is in the north, and the Risan farm area in the south. St. Mikael's Chapel is located a short distance south of the village area. The Drivdalen Adult Education Center is located in the village. The E6 highway and the Dovrebanen railway both pass through the village, but Driva station is no longer a functioning railway stop. Just south of the village, the smaller Vinstradalen valley branches off the main Drivdalen valley.
