= NTNU University Museum =

Coordinates: 63°25′45″N 10°23′15″E

- NTNU Vitenskapmuseet
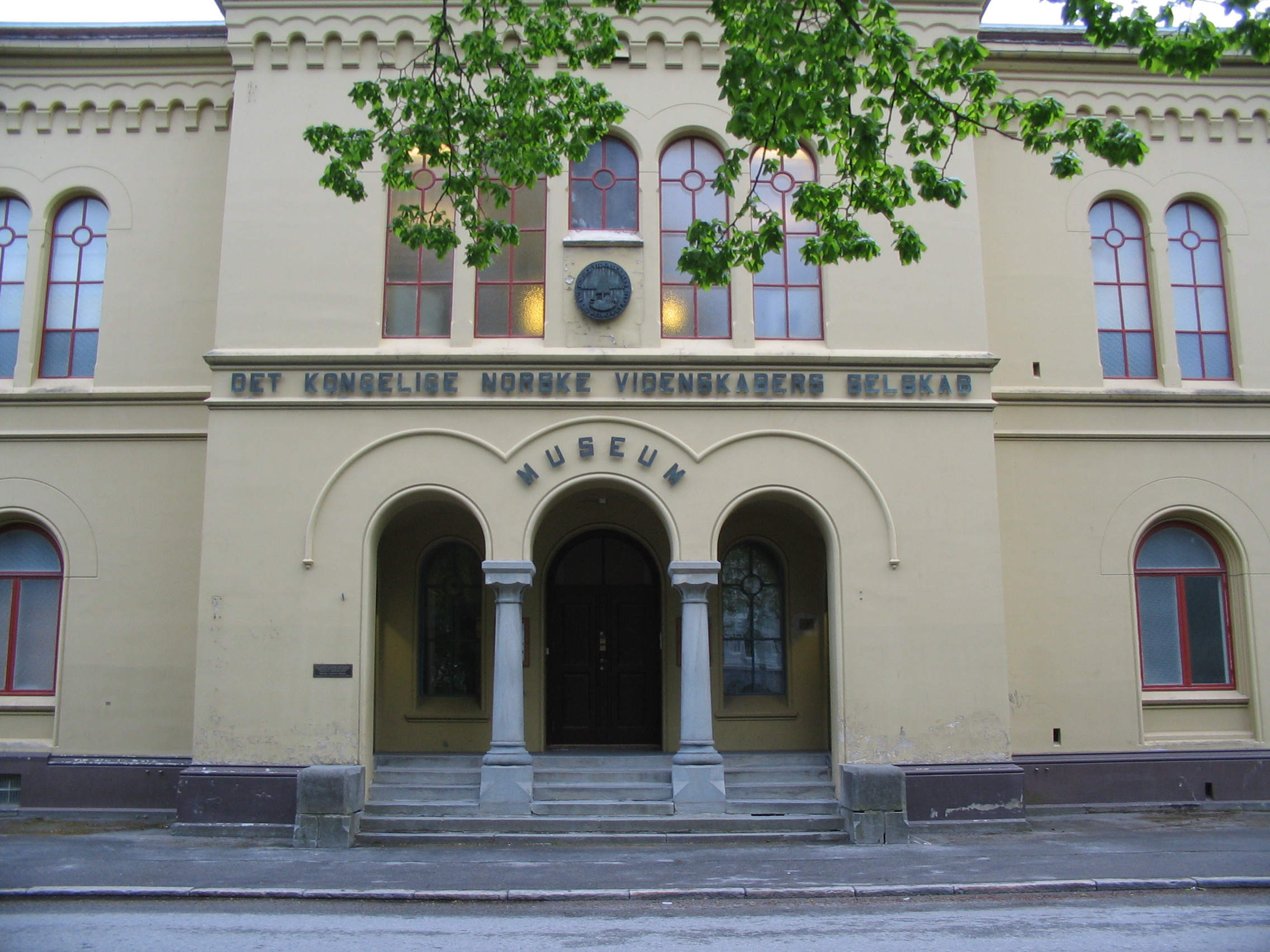
- The former main entrance to the museum
- Established: 1760
- Location: Trondheim, Norway
- Type: University museum, Natural history museum
- Director: Hans K. Stenøien
- Website: www.ntnu.no/vitenskapsmuseet

The NTNU University Museum (Norwegian: Vitenskapsmuseet) in Trondheim is one of seven Norwegian university museums with natural and cultural history collections and exhibits. The museum has research and administrative responsibility over archaeology and biology in Central Norway. Additionally, the museum operates comprehensive community outreach programs and has exhibits in wooden buildings in Kalvskinnet.

The Ringve Botanical Garden in Lade in Trondheim Municipality as well as Kongsvoll Alpine Garden in Dovre Municipality are also under the jurisdiction of the NTNU University Museum.

The museum has its roots in the Royal Norwegian Society of Sciences and Letters (Norwegian: Det Kongelige Norske Videnskabers Selskab, DKNVS, formerly "The Trondheim Society", Norwegian: Det Trondheimske Selskab) since 1760. Since 1968, the museum was closely affiliated with the University of Trondheim, then with NTNU since 1996.

In addition to managing archives and producing exhibits, the museum participates in larger research projects and cooperates with other university museums in digitizing collected works and building databases.

Norway's Museum Union (Norwegian: Norges museumsforbund) named the NTNU University Museum "Norway's Museum of the Year" in 2010.

== History ==
The museum's history can be traced to 1760, when two Norwegians, bishop Johan Ernst Gunnerus and historian and rector Gerhard Schøning, and the Danish historian Peter Frederik Suhm established Det Trondhiemske Selskab. In 1767, the society received royal confirmation of its statutes, and the Royal Norwegian Society of Sciences and Letters (DKNVS) was officially formed. DKNVS then began the process of collecting archaeological and natural history materials, which eventually became the organization's main task.

In 1926, the DKNVS was reorganized and split into an academy and museum, and the DKNVS Museum has since then operated independently. With the establishment of the University in Trondheim in 1968, the museum merged with the university.

A new reorganization effective January 1, 1996 lead to the establishment of the Norwegian University of Sciences and Technology (NTNU). From this point, the museum was officially referred to as the NTNU University Museum.

In 2005, the museum was elevated to the same title as the faculties within NTNU and became a semi-independent entity within the university, placed directly under the jurisdiction of the university leadership like any other faculty.

== Role in society ==
The museum is tasked with developing and conveying knowledge about nature and culture. It is also responsible for protecting and preserving scientific collections, as well as making them available for research, development, and propagation.

The Cultural Heritage Act defines the tasks and scopes of such work in paragraph 1:

Cultural heritage items and cultural heritage environments in distinctive and varied nature shall be protected both as a part of our cultural heritage and identity as a layer in a larger environmental and resource management effort. It is a national responsibility to protect these resources as scientific resources and as a sustainable basis for the experiences, self-understanding, enjoyment, and being of current and future generations.

The museum's geographic jurisdictions is outlined in the Act's second paragraph:

The Sør-Trøndelag and Nord-Trøndelag counties, the municipalities Molde, Kristiansund, Vestnes, Rauma, Nesset, Midsund, Sandøy, Aukra, Fræna, Eide, Averøy, Frei, Gjemnes, Tingvoll, Sunndal, Surnadal, Rindal, Aure, Halsa, Tustna, and Smøla in the Møre og Romsdal counties, along with the municipalities Bindal, Sømna, Brønnøy, Vega, Vevelstad, Herøy, Alstahaug, Leirfjord, Vefsn, Grane, Hattfjelldal, Dønna, Nesna, Hemnes, and Rana in the Nordland county.

== The museum's organization from January 1, 2017 ==
The merger between NTNU, Gjørvik University College, Sør-Trøndelag University College (HiST), and Ålesund University College took effect on January 1, 2016. The activities of each faculty in NTNU continued as usually with small changes in 2016, while preparations were made in different areas in regards to study plans, professional and administrative organizing, and quality control in all areas in anticipation of January 1, 2017, the official completion of the merger.

As a part of the merger between NTNU and the three colleges, the museum's own organization was changed, such that the professional divisions were clarified:

- The section for natural history became the Institute of Natural History
- The section for archaeology and cultural history became the Institute for Archaeology and Cultural History

The other two sections are mainly service providers and were organized into the museum administration virtually unaltered:

- The section for development changed its name to the Section for Public Exhibitions
- The National Laboratory for Dating has not changed its name.

The Institute of Natural History deals with research within biogeography, biosystems, and ecology, with an emphasis on preservation biology. Within NTNU, the institute has had the special responsibility of building and maintain scientific collections of objects and long-term data series. The institute also operates a taxidermy laboratory, two botanical gardens, and provides training and student advising within its professional scope.

The Institute of Archaeology and Cultural History deals with research in pre-historic, historic, and Sami archaeology and operates the laboratory for preservation technology. The institute has had the special responsibility for implementing archaeological surveys and excavations in Trøndelag, Nordmøre, Romsdal, and Helgeland. The institute has a conservation laboratory, and is responsible for the cultural history collections. The institute also provides training for profession-oriented archaeology.

The Section for Public Exhibitions is responsible for the museum's exhibition business. This includes the production and operations of the exhibitions, sometimes on contract from external partners, as well as activities and events, educational programs, hosting programs, and the museum gift shop. This section also cooperates with the NTNU Communications Department to coordinate the lecture series "NTNU Night".

The National Laboratory for Dating uses natural scientific measuring methods to date archaeological, natural historic, and geological materials. The laboratory for carbon-14 dating is the only laboratory in Norway that performs dating measurements of archaeological and natural scientific samples of organic materials. The laboratory also dates lumber by means of rings via dendrochronology.

== Research ==
The museum's main areas of research are taxonomy, biological systematics, and evolutionary history; ecological processes and species development; human-nature interactions; cultural materials and forms of culture on a long-term scale; archaeology and advanced technologies alongside dating methods and the development of chronologies.

The museum is involved in a number of research projects including DNA barcoding and the Applied Underwater Robotics Laboratory (AUR Lab). DNA barcoding uses similarities in the genetic material of organisms to identify species. The AUR Lab is a part of NTNU's efforts within ocean research within the Ocean Space Science and Technology department. In December 2011, the museum took over the coordination of the Norwegian Barcode of Life (NorBOL) project, which is Norway's contribution to The International Barcode of Life project (iBOL).

=== Laboratories ===
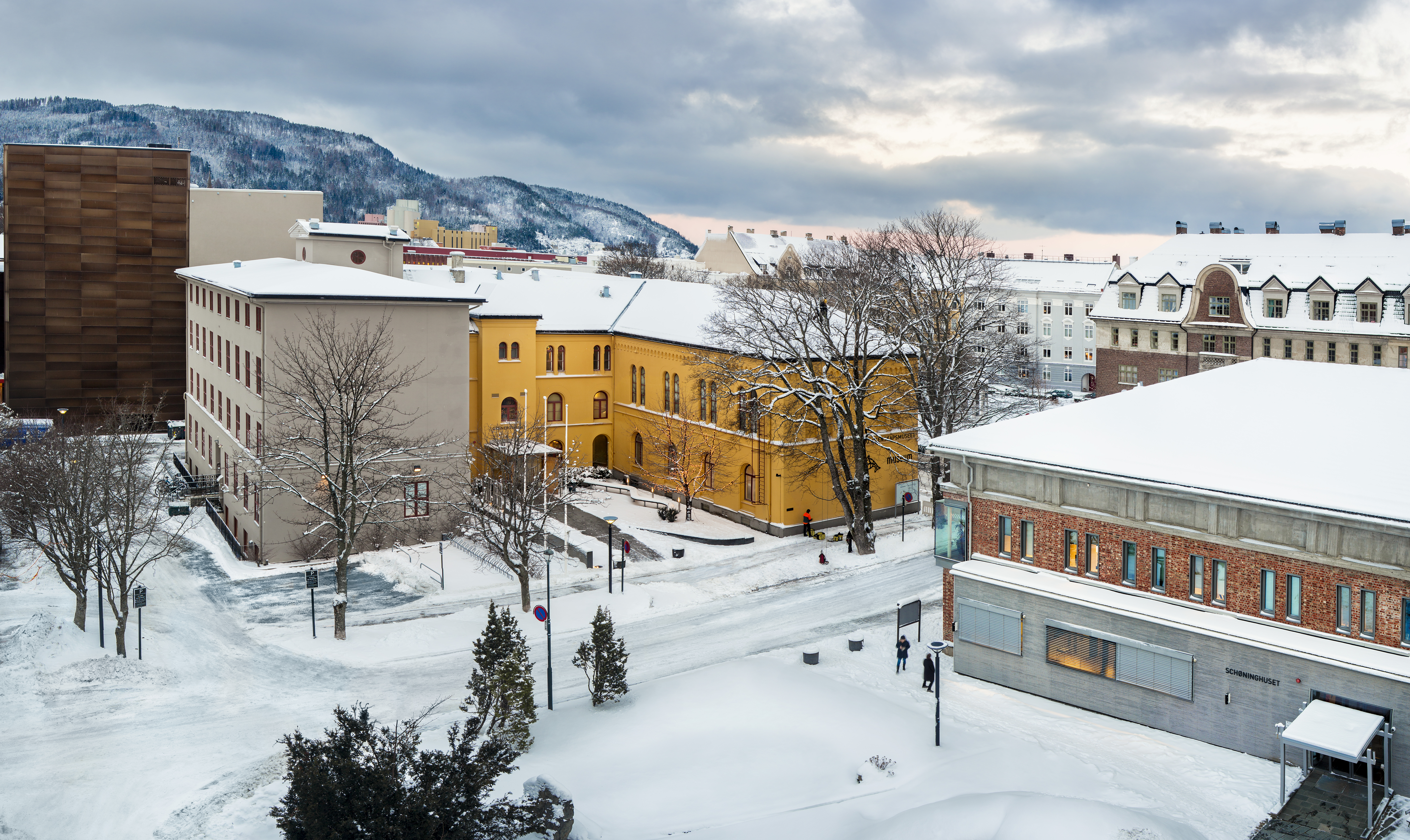
The main entrance to the Science Museum Photo: Trond Sverre Kristiansen - NTNU Science Museum

The museum has several laboratories in addition to the National Laboratory for Dating.

The Conversation Laboratory is responsible for managing the museum's collections. This includes both biological and cultural-historical objects stored in special magazines and/or exhibitions, along with the preservation of findings that cannot be moved to other locations (like rock art). The laboratory arranges magazines for the collections, carries responsibility for the climate control of the exhibitions, and protects and conserves art.

The Taxidermy Workshop prepares animals for exhibitions or research projects. The museum receives animals that have died as a result of hunting, traffic collisions, or natural causes. The workshop will accept animals from private individuals, the Norwegian Environmental Agency, through research projects, and from the environmental protection departments of the region's various county governors. The workshop is also responsible for restoring older stuffed animals, and takes samples for DNA or environmental analyses.

The Molecular Laboratory extracts DNA from all types of organisms. It has equipment for duplicating DNA fragments, measuring DNA concentrations, electrophoresis studies, and the preparation of samples for DNA sequencing. This work is central for the research projects involving NorBOL, whereby a registry of species using short, standardized pieces of genetic material (DNA Barcoding) is made available.

== Collections ==
The museum has scientific collections within cultural history, zoology, botany, and geology. Since it is not possible to display all of its objects within their buildings, the museum works with other Norwegian university museums to digitize collections/pictures of each item. In 2007, the museum established the University Museums' IT Organization (Norwegian: Universitetsmuseenes IT-organisasjon), which makes these digitized collections available through the university museums' collective access points.

=== Cultural History Collections ===
These collections date back to the 1760s, when DKVNS began collecting natural history and cultural history materials.

==== Prehistoric archaeological collection ====
This collection contains objects from the past 11,000 years, i.e. from roughly 8000 BCE until the present date. The types of objects vary from small fragments of flint to gold jewelry. The collection also contains everyday tools and stones and metal weapons and jewelry crafted from metal, animal horns, and wood. The prehistoric exhibition has placed some of these objects on display.

==== Church collection ====
This collection contains church art and equipment from the 12th century until the 19th century, particularly church equipment that was replaced in the latter half of the 19th century. Most of these objects had a liturgical function and were received by the museum as gifts or through sales. The collection is not open to the public, but is used for studies.

==== Coin collection ====
The museum's coin collection was established around 1840 and contains approximately 50,000 coins, medallions, bank notes, and chips. The most important part of the collection contains coins from the Viking Age and the Middle Ages, discovered at archaeological excavations, along with some incidental finds in Romsdal, Nord-Møre, Trøndelag, and the southern parts of Nordland. The collection also contains donations, like the Arne E. Holm's collection of Greek, Roman, and Byzantium coins and Anton Røstad's collection of European coins and bank notes from the 18th, 19th, and 20th centuries. The collection even contains German bank notes from the 1920s, including the 50 billion mark.

==== Trondheim archaeological collection ====
This collection contains more than 200,000 items that were found in the massive excavation in the city's center. A few of these findings date back to before the city's foundation at Nidarneset, but most of them are from the 11th century or more recent. The Middle Ages exhibition displays findings from the city archaeological collection.

=== Zoological collection ===
This collection contains around 906,000 objects, from insects to stuffed animals. Some of these items are over 200 years old, but the most represented are from the 20th century. A particularly well-preserved collection is the "Type Collection", which consists of specimens that were used to define and describe new species. Around 90% of the collection is registered in the museum's own database, ZOOTRON.

=== Botanical collections ===
The main part of the botanical collection contains dried plants in herbaria. The collection also contains objects, tissue samples, and DNA extracts stored in frozen states and other dry-storage object collections. Most of the herbaria materials are registered in national databases. Occurrence data can also be found in the mapping service Artskart and GBIF-Norge, the Norwegian counterpart in the Global Biodiversity Information Facility (GBIF).

In addition to the dry samples, the museum's collections also contains living plants in the botanical gardens in Ringve and Kongsvoll.

=== Geological collections ===
The museum's collections of minerals, rocks, and fossils are among the earliest collected objects in Norway's museums. The collection contains around 8000 objects, where roughly 30 minerals are from the museum's first catalog in 1779. None of the items in the geological collection are placed on display today.

== Exhibitions ==
The museum has both fixed, permanent exhibitions, as well as temporary exhibitions. These are partially arranged by the museum itself, while others are organized by guest exhibitions produced by other institutions or organizations, or in collaboration with the museum and other entities.

The exhibitions are shown in three buildings in Kalvskinnet in Trondheim:

In the building Gunnerushuset, archaeological exhibits from the Stone, Bronze, and Iron ages, along with the Viking Age in Central Norway are placed on display. The building also houses other exhibits, like the "1760 - Science at the Edge of the World" exhibition. This exhibition addresses the history of the Royal Norwegian Society of Sciences and Letters and a few items from the museum's very first collections. The Institute for Archaeology and Cultural History, along with the Section for Public Exhibitions have administrative offices in this building.

In the building Suhmhuset, the museum runs the "Middle Ages in Trondheim" exhibition, which was nominated for the European Museum of the Year Award in 1997. This building also houses the "Who Owns History" exhibit containing southern Sami archaeological items.

Schøninghuset contains the museum's administration, the offices for the Institute of Natural History, and several magazines.

As of April 2017, the museum has been in the process of a reorganization due to the large exhibit, "BODY WORLDS Vital", which was displayed in Gunnerhuset between June 8 and October 8, 2017. Several of the museum's exhibits were removed to make room for BODY WORLDS Vital. Several were replaced again, either entirely or partially after October 2017.

The following exhibits remained during "BODY WORLDS Vital":

Middle Ages in Trondheim

This exhibit is permanent. It primarily focuses on recreating life in Trondheim during the Catholic Middle Ages, circa 1010–1537, through a simulated image created from objects and building ruins found underneath Trondheim streets. Norway's oldest wooden constructions were found in Trondheim, and these buildings have been reconstructed based on the results of archaeological findings.

Who owns history?

This exhibit opened on February 5, 2017, and remained on displayed throughout the year. It was produced in conjunction with Tråante 2017 and in collaboration with collaboration with the Saemien Sijte Southern Sámi museum, the Rørosmuseet museum, and the Lesja Village Museum. The exhibit includes finds that show the Sámi presence in Southern Norway far earlier than previously thought.

1760 - Science at the Edge of the World

The exhibit depicts the 18th century as a transition period between the Middle Age church-dominated worldview and the start of the modern era - the Enlightenment Era and the Scientific Revolution. It offers an image of Trondheim in the 18th century, the early learning environment and the conditions for the establishment of DKNVS. The exhibition deals with astronomy and science, technological advancements, and societal upheaval, the DKNVS's operations and exhibition business. Books and publications play an important role in the exhibit, alongside the original printings and illustrations.

Central Norway's prehistory

The exhibit regarding Central Norway's prehistory covers a span of 10,000 years, from the early Stone Age until the 11th century BCE. It contains tools of flint, quartz, and slate from the Stone Age. From the Bronze Age, the exhibit contains jewelry, weapons, and tools from bronze from abroad. Findings from the early Iron Age reflect tapestry-weaving, goldsmithing, blacksmithing, and imports from the Roman Empire.

The exhibition is the only preserved "classical" archaeological exhibit in Norway. Human tools, jewelry, and weapons are exhibited in the manner in which they were found, without an attempt to reconstruct living environments or objects.

These exhibits were deconstructed or closed during BODY WORLDS, but were partially replaced in October 2017.

Polar Night

This exhibit covers light, plans, and animals in the Arctic Ocean.

Deadly Business

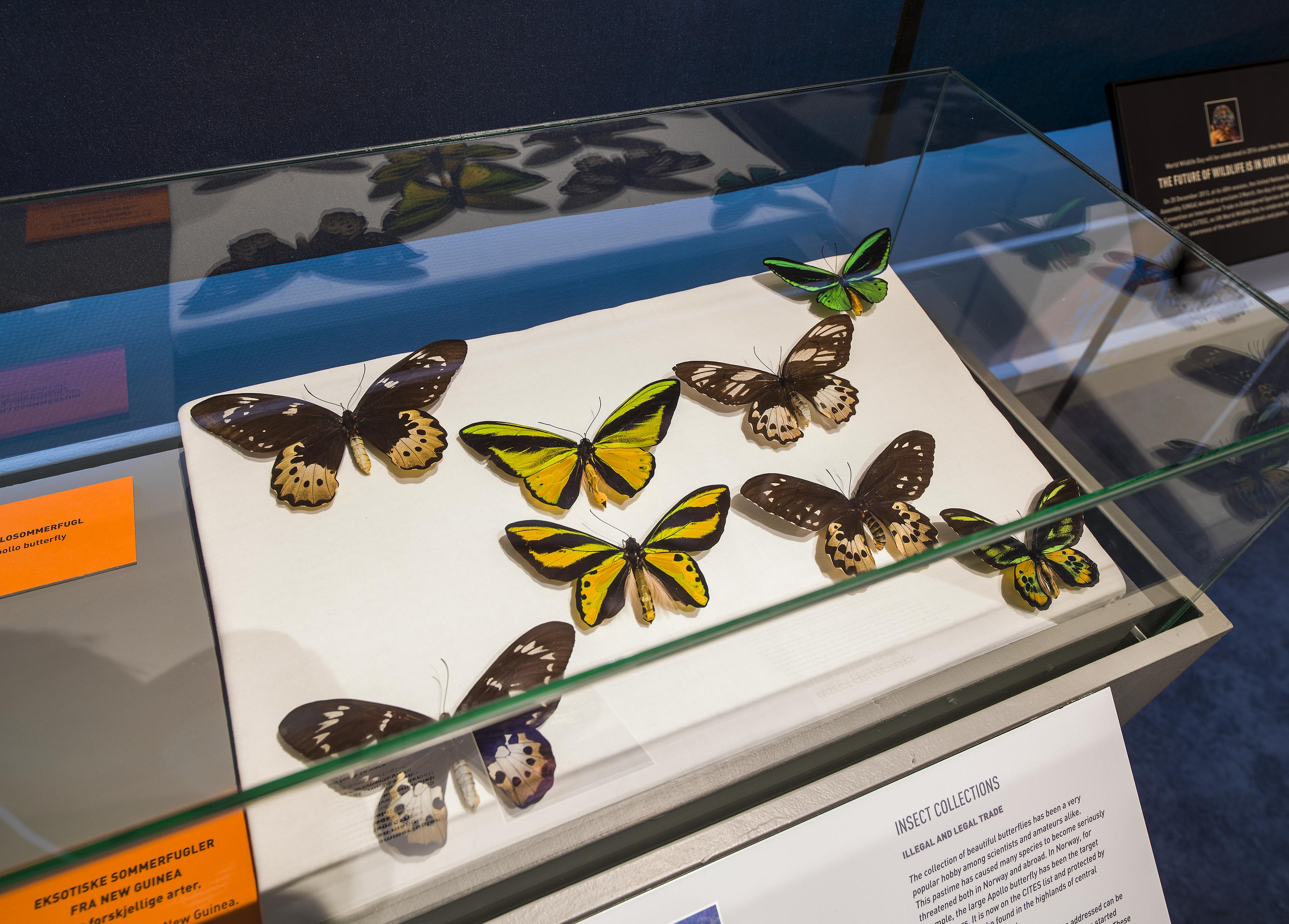
Butterflies in the Exhibition on Illegal Trade Photo: Trond Sverre Kristiansen/NTNU Vitenskapsmuseet

This exhibit shows how illegal businesses threaten the existence of certain species.

Nature/Environment

This exhibition displays the typical Norwegian nature biomes from coasts to mountains, including Mixed coniferous forest and temperate broadleaf forests, swamps, lakes, rivers and streams, beaches, islets, and reefs. The lifelike constructions of these environments feature a large portion of Norway's plants and birds. This exhibit includes low-hanging plants, moss, and other vascular plant.

Internet exhibits

The museum produces both its own internet exhibitions in connection with their physical exhibits, as well as standalone exhibits. These can show parts of the collections: the museum's history, along with collections and items placed in context with each other.

== New dissemination methods ==
The museum has been involved in projects for spreading knowledge and scientific interest in new ways and through other media. The museum has cooperated with "TV-Adessa" in a network television series entitled "Dead animals in the archive". Several million objects can be found in the museum's magazines and only a small portion of these are ever exhibited to the public at any given time. Through "Dead animals in the archive", viewers were able to experience some of the diverse animal species in the museum's magazines.

In cooperation with students at the Institute for Information Technology at NTNU, the museum developed the "Science Game", a virtual reconstruction of Trondheim in the Middle Ages. Through animation and video game technology, they created short films that depicted how the Middle Ages in Trondheim may have looked.

The Science Game is an app for smart phones that is designed for use while at the museum's exhibit. The app represents a new way of becoming familiar with and using the exhibits.

== Botanical gardens ==
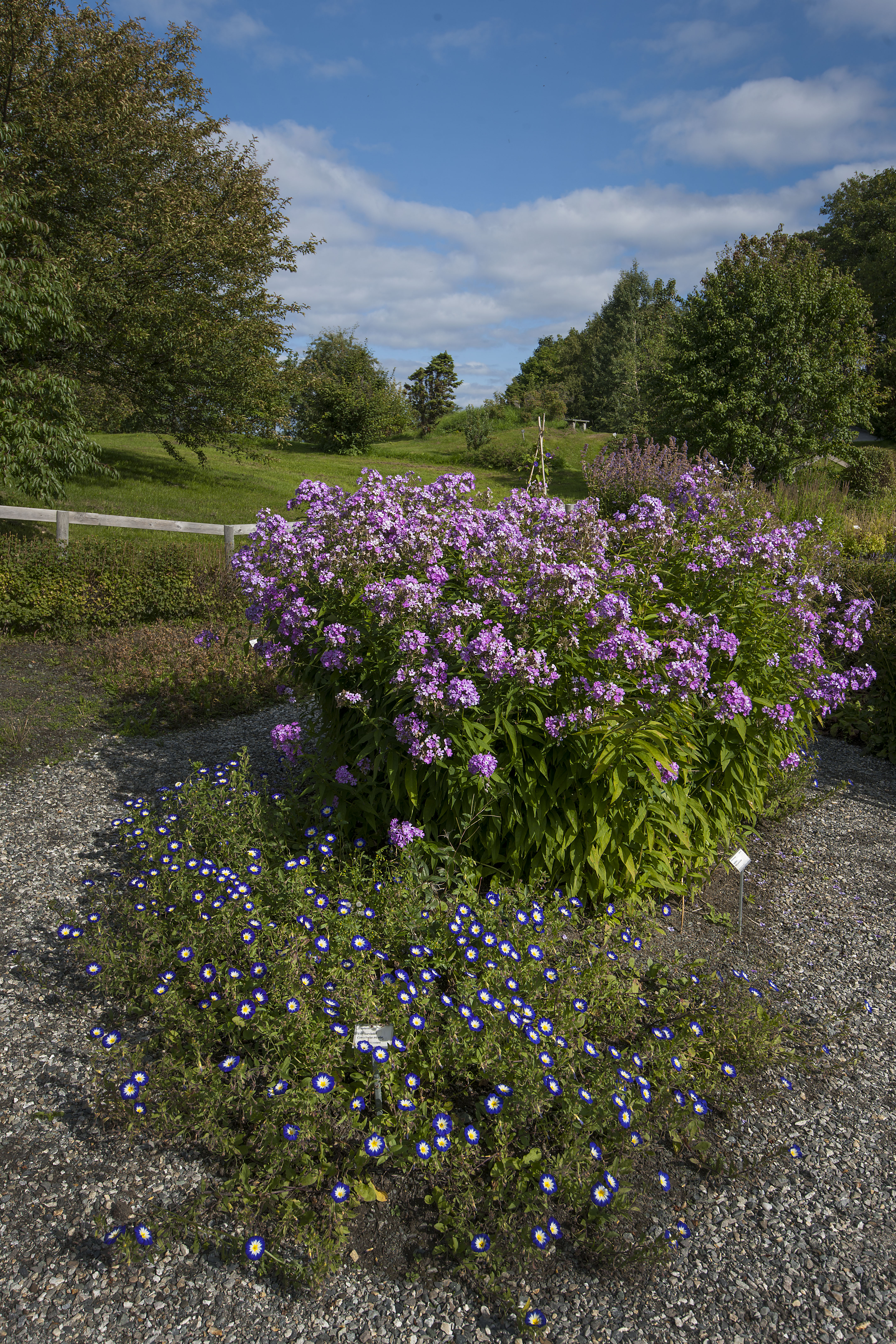
From the Ringve Botanical Garden Photo: Åge Hojem/Vitenskapsmuseet

=== Ringve Botanical Garden ===
The botanical garden encircles the Ringve Music Museum at Lade, east of Trondheim, roughly three kilometers from the city's center. The botanical garden's most important task is to take care of and develop the plant collections that are used for research and teaching, to spread knowledge about botanical diversity, and to contribute to the conservation of endangered species.

The garden comprises roughly 130 acres and is divided into several discrete areas: the Arboretum containing bushes and trees from the Northern Hemisphere; the "Old Garden" with traditional garden plants from Central Norway; the "Park", which is the old courtyard that used to serve as a farmhouse; the "Renaissance Garden", an herb garden that contains plants that were first sown in Trondheim in the 17th century; and the "Plant System", a systematic garden constructed to display the familial relationships between plants and their developmental history.

=== Kongsvoll Mountain Garden ===
The mountain garden covers 8 acres in an area situated 805 meters above sea level at the Kongsvoll mountain lodge in Dovre Municipality. It is a natural garden containing local flora and vegetation. The mountain garden is the only botanical mountain garden in Scandinavia. The garden contains most of the typical vascular plants that grow in the mountain regions in Southern Norway. In addition, the garden contains a few uncommon plants, emphasizing the particular characteristics of the rich flora of Dovrefjell.

The mountain garden was established in 1992 by Simen Bretten, who was then the leader of the Kongsvoll biological station. The new infrastructure that was established replaced an earlier mountain garden that was established in 1924 by the botanist Thekla Resvoll, which was situated at Kongsvoll Station.

=== See also ===
- Gunnerus Library
