= Hjerkinn Station =

Railway station in Dovre, Norway

Hjerkinn
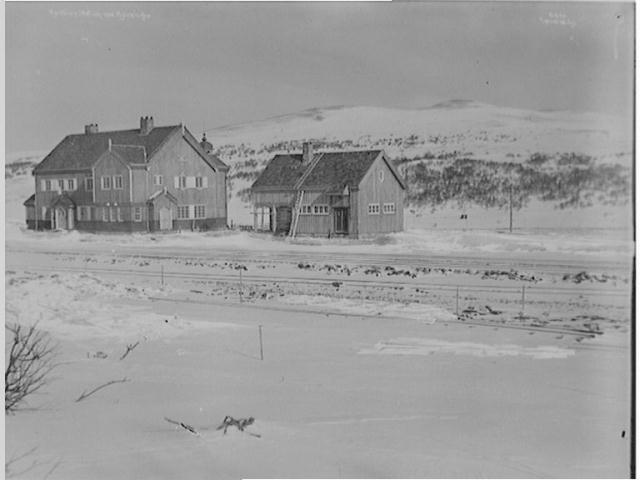
- March 8, 1921

General information
- Location: Hjerkinn, Dovre Municipality; Norway
- Coordinates: 63°13′12″N 9°32′27″E
- Elevation: 1,017.0 m (3,336.6 ft) AMSL
- Owner: Bane NOR
- Operator: SJ Norge
- Line: Dovre Line
- Distance: 381.74 km (237.20 mi)
- Platforms: 2
- Bus routes: To Folldal

Other information
- Station code: HJN

History
- Opened: 1921
Location

Hjerkinn Station (IATA: YVH) is a railway station located at Hjerkinn in Dovre Municipality in Innlandet county, Norway. The station is located on the Dovre Line and served by four daily express trains each direction to Oslo and Trondheim. There is no settlement at Hjerkinn, though there is an army base as well as the nearby Dovre National Park.

== History ==
The station was opened in 1921 as part of the Dovre Line when it was extended from Dombås to Trondheim. The station building, designed by Erik Glosimodt, was finished in 1918. It has been preserved as a cultural heritage site. The highest point of the Dovre Line, at 1024 meters, is about one kilometer north of the station.

== See also ==
- Media related to Hjerkinn stasjon at Wikimedia Commons
- Nidareid train disaster

| Preceding station | Express trains | Following station |
|---|---|---|
| Dombås towards Oslo S | F6 | Kongsvoll towards Trondheim S |
