= St. Mikael's Chapel =

Church in Trøndelag, Norway

St. Michael's Chapel
- St. Mikaels kapell
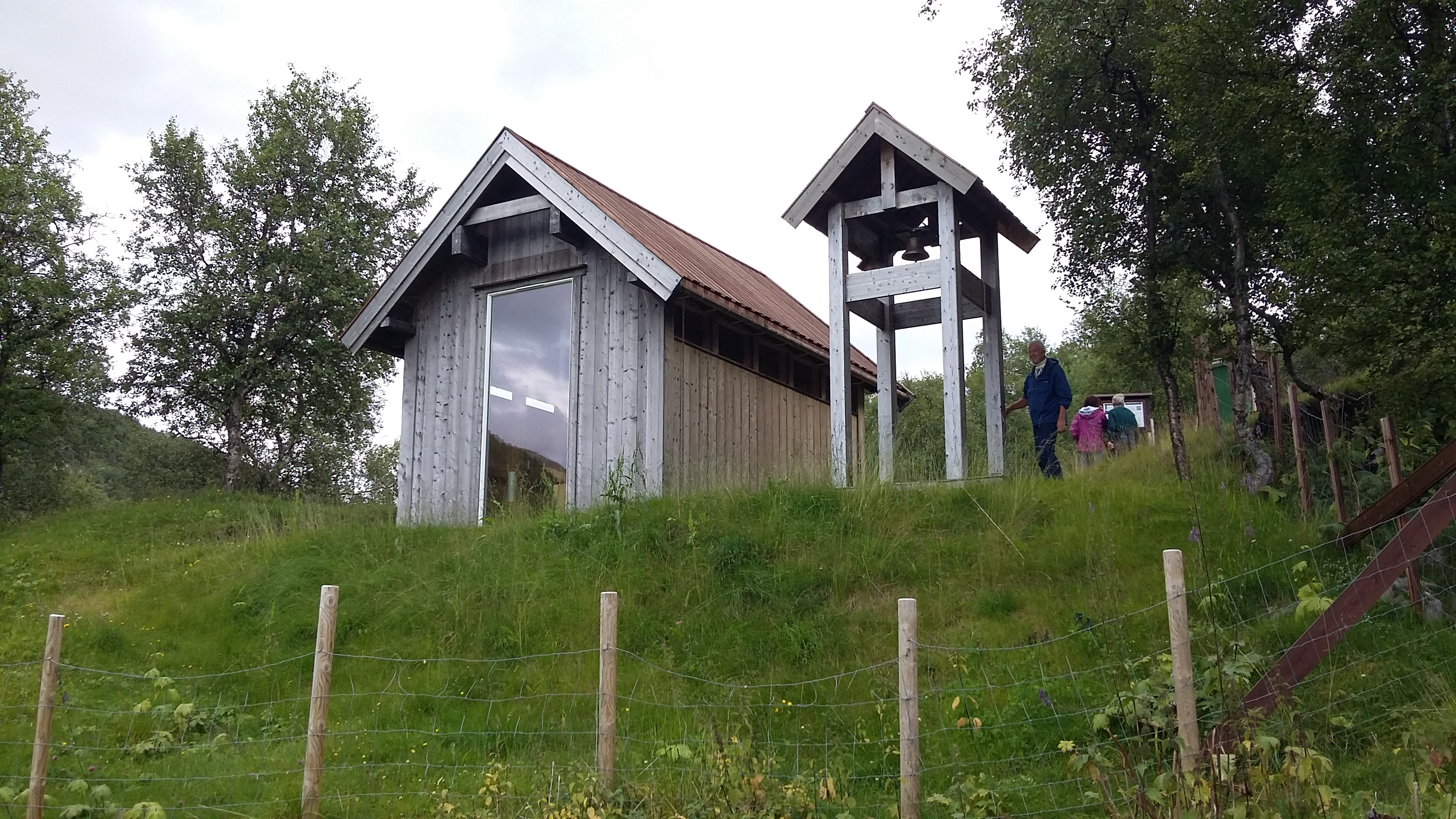
- View of the chapel
- St. Michael's Chapel
- 62.517316171°N 09.6307198405°E
- Location: Oppdal Municipality, Trøndelag
- Country: Norway
- Denomination: Church of Norway
- Churchmanship: Evangelical Lutheran

History
- Status: Chapel
- Founded: 2012
- Consecrated: 26 September 2012

Architecture
- Functional status: Active
- Architect: Yngvild Wathne Sæther
- Architectural type: Long church
- Completed: 2012 (14 years ago)

Specifications
- Capacity: 50
- Materials: Wood

Administration
- Diocese: Nidaros bispedømme
- Deanery: Gauldal prosti
- Parish: Oppdal

St. Michael's Chapel (Norwegian: St. Mikaels kapell) is a parish church of the Church of Norway in Oppdal Municipality in Trøndelag county, Norway. It is located in the Drivdalen valley, just south of the village of Driva, about 10 kilometres (6.2 mi) south of the village of Oppdal. It is a small annex chapel in the Oppdal parish which is part of the Gauldal prosti (deanery) in the Diocese of Nidaros. The small wooden chapel was built in a long church style in 2012 using plans drawn up by the architect Yngvild Wathne Sæther. The church seats about 50 people, but it is sometimes used as the backdrop for outdoor services.

== History ==
The building was planned by the Tourism Drivdalen working group, the result of some planning for the future that was organized in the winter of 2010. The idea of a church with a connection to The Pilgrims Path over the Dovrefjell Mountains, comes from the fact that during the Middle Ages there was a church called Loskirka (The Church of Loe) in the Drivdalen valley, located at one of the farms in Losgrenda. The parish priest, Arne Aspeland, contributed to the work in designing the chapel interior. The church has no graveyard.

The chapel was built on a voluntary basis with financial support from a number of local companies including Holtermann's Endowment managed by the Oppdal church council (the endowment ended in 2012). The building was consecrated on Michaelmas, 29 September 2012, with the parish priest Arne Aspeland, Bishop Tor Singsaas, Dean Øystein Flø, and Pastor Øyvind Vognild present at the ceremony. Aspeland had the honor of leading the first Mass that was held in conjunction with the consecration. The chapel got a church bell during the summer of 2013 and it was used first time 19 July the same year.

== See also ==
- List of churches in Nidaros
