= Drivdalen =

Valley in Trøndelag, Norway

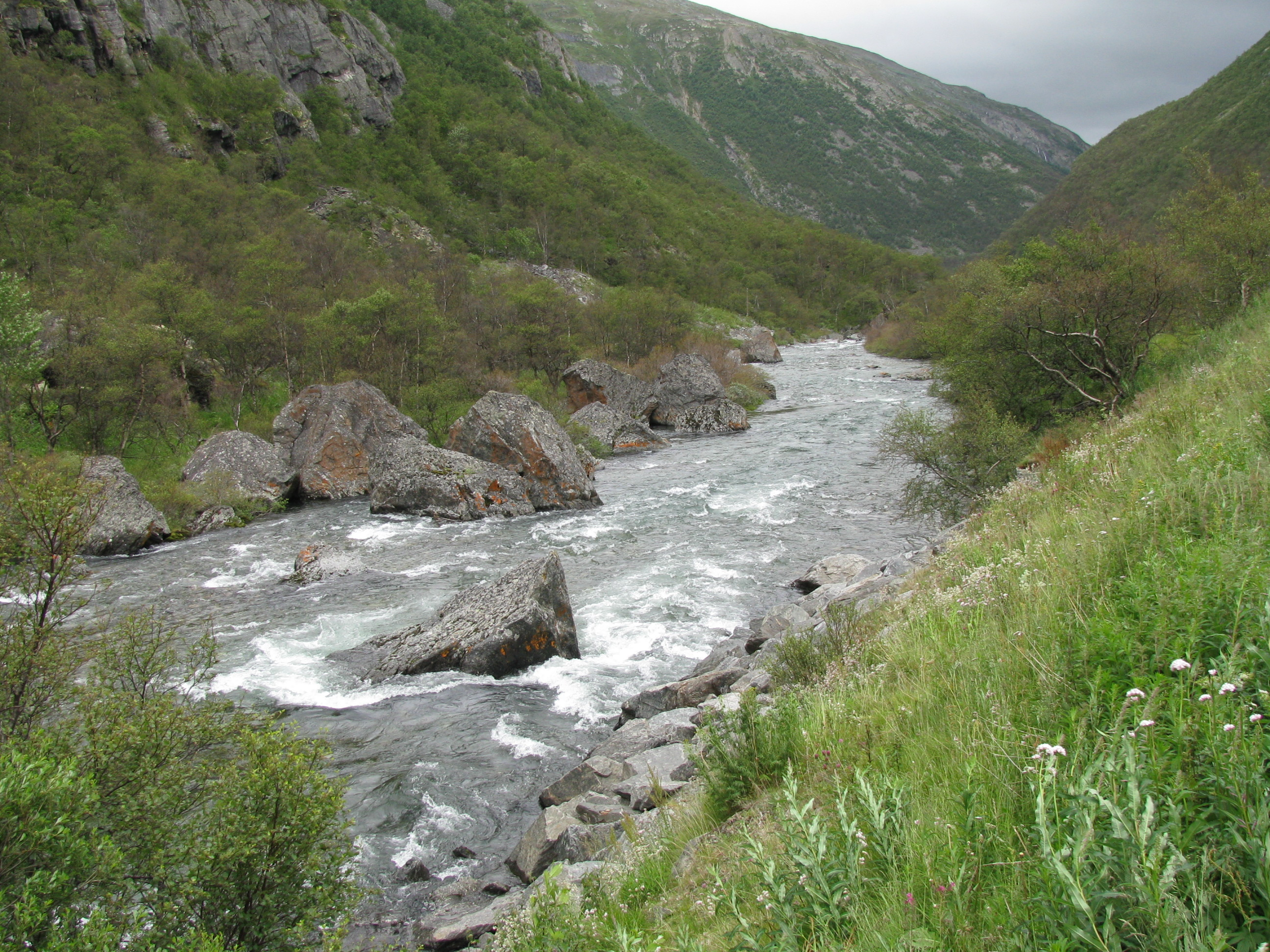
- Drivdalen (Driv valley) with the river Driva going northwards from Dovrefjell. The E6 road follows this valley.
- Length: 35 kilometres (22 mi); N-S, then E-W
- Width: 2.5 kilometres (1.6 mi)

Geology
- Type: River valley

Geography
- Location: Trøndelag, Norway
- Population centers: Oppdal
- Coordinates: 62.4326°N 09.5983°E
- Rivers: Driva river

Location
- Interactive map of the valley

Drivdalen is a river valley located in Oppdal Municipality in Trøndelag county, Norway. The valley surrounds the river Driva. The European route E6 and the Dovre Line follow the river through much of the valley. The valley is the site of the "Old Kings' Road" (Norwegian: Vårstigen) with Kongsvoll being one stop along the road.

The valley runs north through Oppdal Municipality, and then at the mountain Allmannberget and the village of Oppdal, the valley (and river) turns west and heads into the neighboring Sunndal Municipality (in Møre og Romsdal county), where it becomes the Sunndalen valley. The Dovrefjell–Sunndalsfjella National Park lies southwest and east of the valley. The Vinstradalen is a smaller side valley that branches off the main Drivdalen valley, just south of the village of Driva.

Drivdalen is known for its lush vegetation and is of special botanical importance with a number of rare species and varieties. In the southernmost part, where the valley starts at Dovrefjell is found the Kongsvoll Alpine Garden of the NTNU University Museum.

== See also ==
- List of rivers in Norway
