= Kongsvoll Alpine Garden =

Botanical garden in Norway

Coordinates: 62.30207°N 9.60386°E

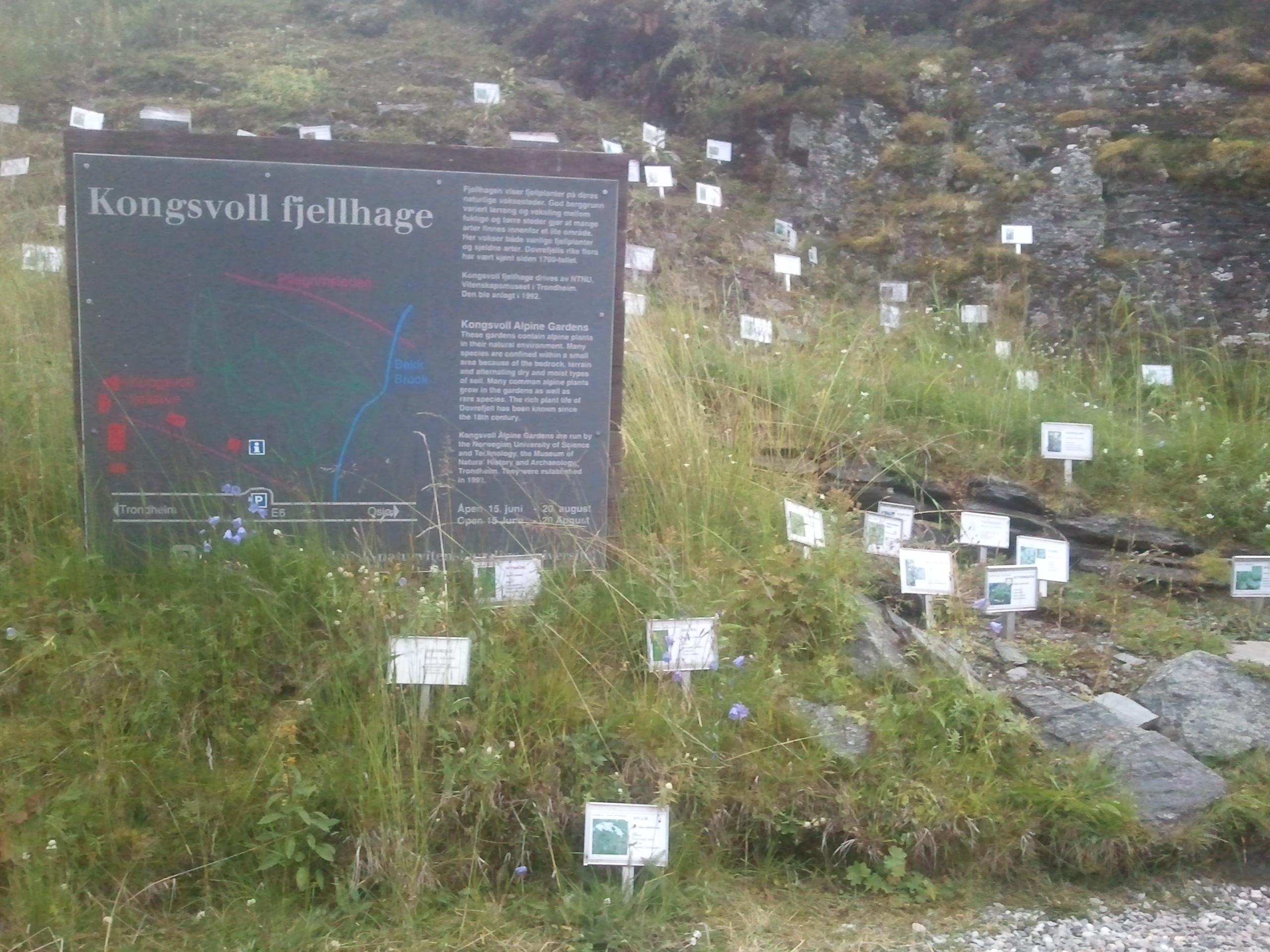
Kongsvoll Alpine Garden information board

Kongsvoll Alpine Garden (Kongsvoll fjellhage) is a small botanical garden for alpine plants situated at Kongsvold Fjeldstue, 890 masl at Dovrefjell in Central Norway. Most of the plants are local to Dovrefjell and adjacent mountain ranges in Trøndelag and Møre og Romsdal. The garden is administered by the NTNU University Museum.

It is the only alpine botanical garden in Scandinavia. Apart from local flora, the garden also displays the most common vascular plants from mountain ranges in central and southern Norway. It contains about 420 species of vascular plants, and in addition a number of mosses and lichens.

The garden was created in 1992 by Simen Bretten, manager of the Kongsvoll Biolocial Station. It replaces an older garden established in 1924 by the botanist Thekla Resvoll at the then Kongsvoll Station. The older garden was originally administered by University of Oslo until 1975, and later by NTNU.
