= Peter Frederik Suhm =

Danish historian (1728–1798)

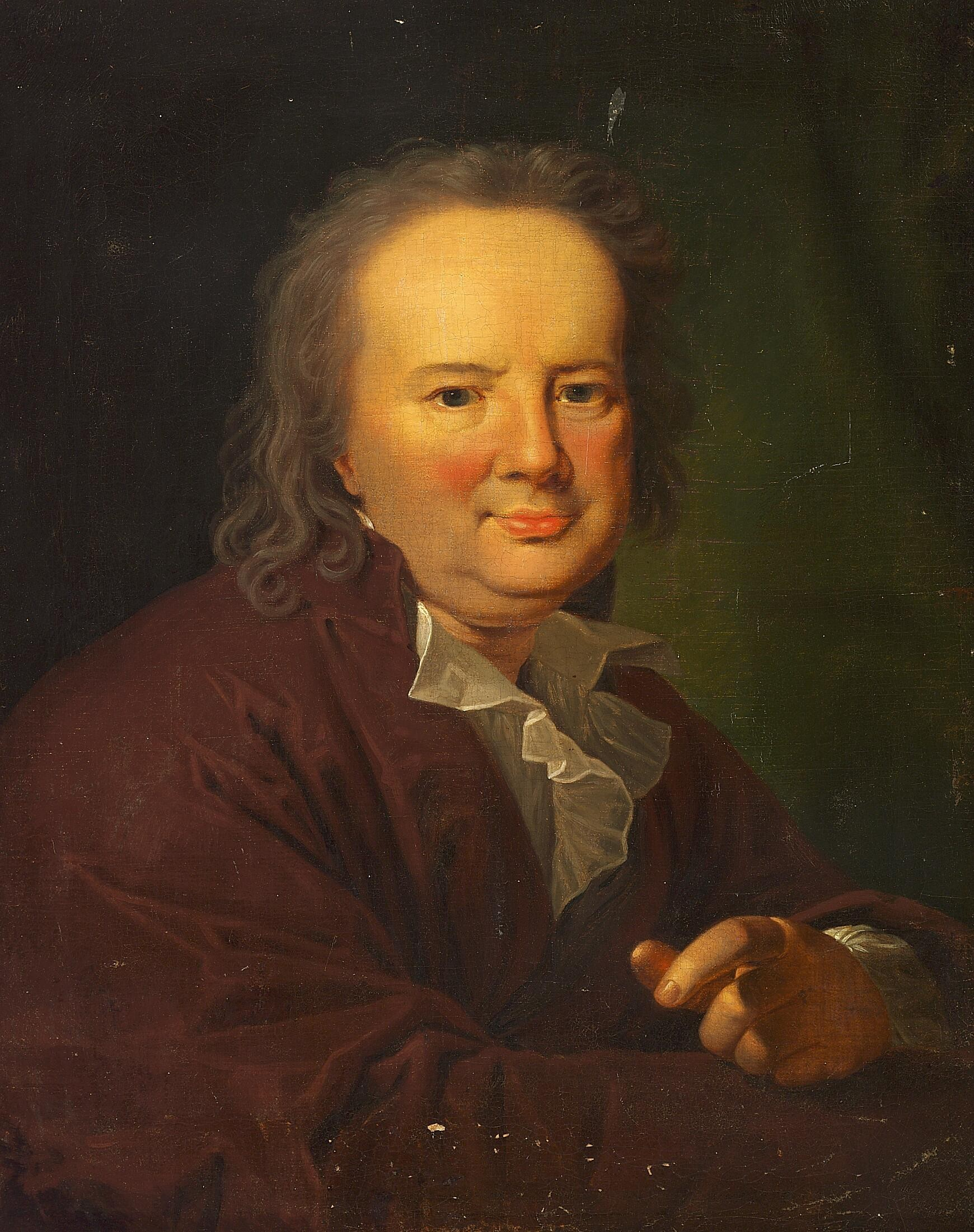
- Portrait of Peter Frederik Suhm by Jens Juel
- Born: 18 October 1728; Copenhagen, Denmark
- Died: 7 September 1798 (aged 69); Copenhagen, Denmark
- Resting place: 1213
- Education: University of Copenhagen
- Occupation: Historian

Peter Frederik Suhm (18 October 1728 – 7 September 1798), was a Danish historian.

== Biography ==
Suhm studied at the University of Copenhagen from 1746 to 1751, and one of his teachers was Ludvig Holberg. In 1749 he translated a comedy of Plautus and a French theatrical piece.

In 1751 he traveled to Trondheim together with the Danish historian Gerhard Schøning, with whom he continued to collaborate over the following years. Together they produced Forbedringer til den gamle danske og norske Historie (Improvements to the old Danish-Norwegian History) in 1757. In Trondheim he married Karen Angell (1732–1788) 19 April 1752. She was the daughter and only inheritor of a wealthy Norwegian merchant Lorentz Angell who had died the previous year. Karen Angell's mother accepted the marriage on the condition that they stayed in Trondheim for the remainder of her life. Suhm accepted, and stayed on in Trondheim, with a short interval in Copenhagen in 1755, for the next nine years, where she died and Suhm and his wife moved back to Copenhagen. The inherited wealth (300,000 riksdaler) allowed Suhm to enjoy a life devoted to the sciences and his book collection.

Schöning and Suhm, together with Johan Ernst Gunnerus, founded the Royal Norwegian Society of Sciences and Letters in 1760 under the name Det Trondhiemske Selskab (the Trondheim Society). From 1761 it published academic papers in a series titled Skrifter. It was the northernmost scientific society in the world.

Suhm published Trondhjemske samlinger (five volumes) from 1761 to 1765. In 1771 he published Udsigt over videnskabernes og de skjønne kunsters tilstand i Danmark og Norge. Udtog af Danmarks, Norges og Holsteins historie (1776) was used in the 19th century as a handbook of history. From 1782 to 1793 he published the first seven volumes of his detailed history of Denmark (Historie af Danmark).

Suhm was a chairman of the Danish Academy of Sciences. In 1779 he became a member of the Royal Swedish Academy of Sciences.

In October 1788 he made second marriage with Christiane Becker (1764–1799), daughter of Johann Gottfried Becker (1723–1790) and Anna Christina Torm (1738–1809).

Suhm was also a book collector. His collection was comprised about 100 000 volumes. In 1775 he opened his library for the public use. In 1796 Moldenhawer purchased his collection for the Royal Danish Library on the condition that the payment would continue in the form of an annuity for Suhm and his wife, but both died shortly after the purchase was completed.

He is buried in the crypt of the Christian's Church in Copenhagen. Suhmsgade in Copenhagen is named after him.

== Legacy ==
Suhmsgade in Copenhagen is named after him, along with Suhms gate in Oslo, Suhms gate in Trondheim, and Suhmhuset in Trondheim, part of NTNU University Museum.
