= NSB Class 30 =

Class of Norwegian steam locomotives

NSB class 30
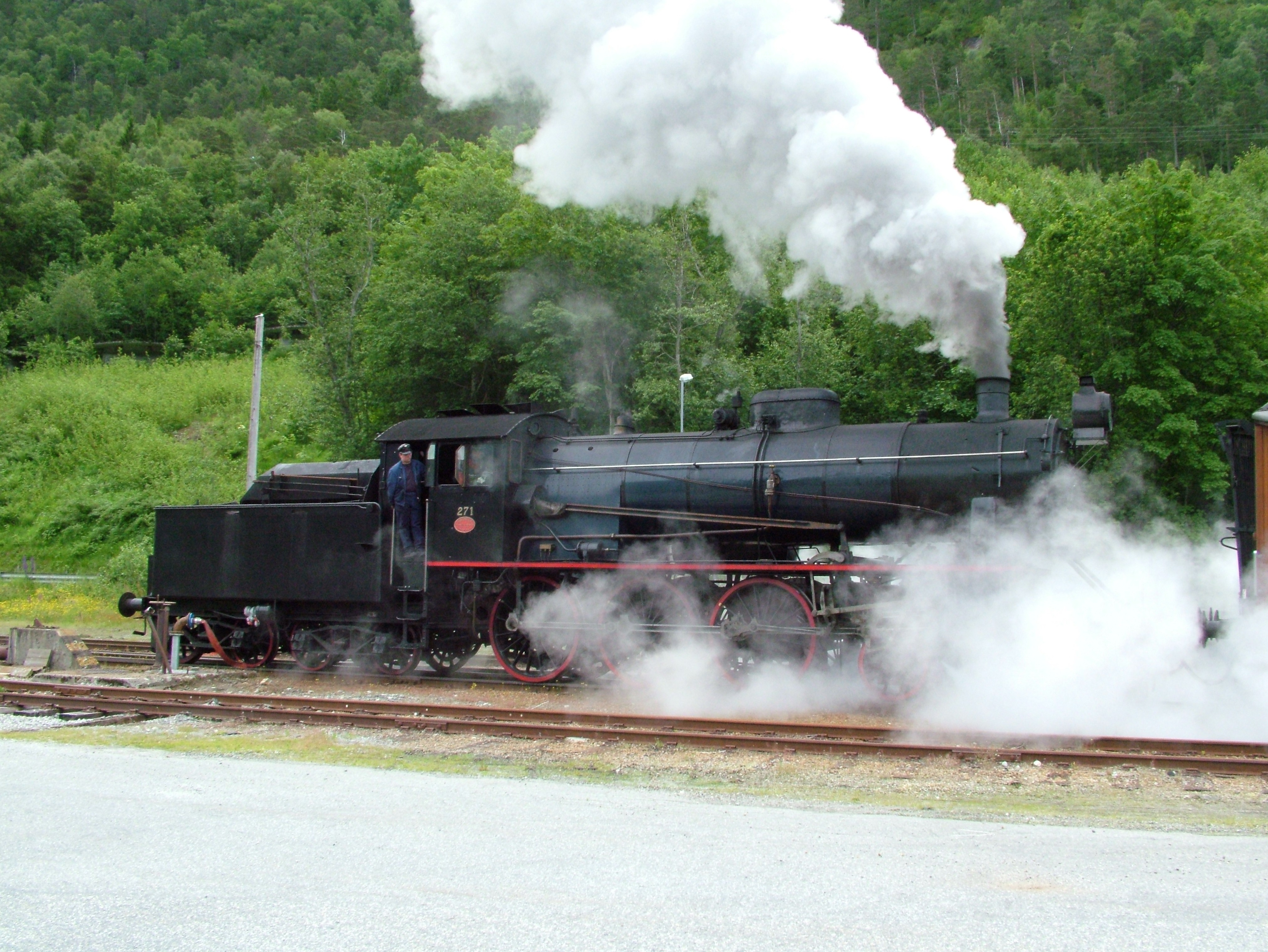
- The preserved engine no. 271 on the Rauma Line
Type and origin
- Power type: Steam
- Builder: Thune (22), NMI (23)
- Build date: 1914–1916, 1919–1921, 1938–1939
- Total produced: 45
Specifications
- Gauge: 1,435 mm (4 ft 8 1/2 in)
- Driver dia.: 1,600 mm (63.0 in)
- Length: 17.51 m (57 ft 5 in)
- Adhesive weight: 30a: 41.1 tonnes (40.5 long tons; 45.3 short tons), 30b: 42.9 tonnes (42.2 long tons; 47.3 short tons), 30c: 43.9 tonnes (43.2 long tons; 48.4 short tons)
- Total weight: 30a: 95.8 tonnes (94.3 long tons; 105.6 short tons), 30b: 100.5 tonnes (98.9 long tons; 110.8 short tons), 30c: 109.5 tonnes (107.8 long tons; 120.7 short tons)
- Cylinders: 30a: Four (simple), 30b/c: Four: 2 HP, 2 LP
- Cylinder size: 30a: 390 mm × 600 mm (15.35 in × 23.62 in)
- High-pressure cylinder: 30b/c: 390 mm × 600 mm (15.35 in × 23.62 in)
- Low-pressure cylinder: 30b/c: 585 mm × 600 mm (23.03 in × 23.62 in)
Performance figures
- Maximum speed: Forwards: 90 km/h (56 mph), Backwards: 50 km/h (31 mph)

The NSB class 30 was a 4-6-0 tender steam locomotive formerly used in Norway by Norwegian State Railways. The class 30 engines were an upsized version of the NSB Class 45 engines. Class 30 locomotives were originally intended for use on the Dovre Line, but they were employed throughout the Norwegian rail network. The first of these engines were produced in 1914, the last in 1939.

A total of 45 type 30 engines were completed by Thune which produced 22 engines, and NMI which produced 23 engines. The type 30 was produced in three versions. Class 30a had four cylinder high pressure engine, while class 30b and 30c were compound engines. 18 units were made of the lightest version the 30a (numbered 256-258, 271-282, and 316-318), there were 23 units of the 30b (numbered 346-368), while 4 units were made of the heaviest version, the 30c (numbered 466 to 469). The last class 30 engines were withdrawn from service in 1969. However, engine no. 271 was preserved by the Norwegian Railway Club, and has been used by their department Norsk Museumstog for heritage trains on lines like the Rauma Line.

== Incident ==
- Two NSB class 30b engines, no. 364 and no. 365, double-headed to haul one of the trains involved in the Nidareid train disaster in 1921.
