= Nidareid train disaster =

1921 railway incident in Norway

Coordinates: 63°25′45″N 10°22′22″E

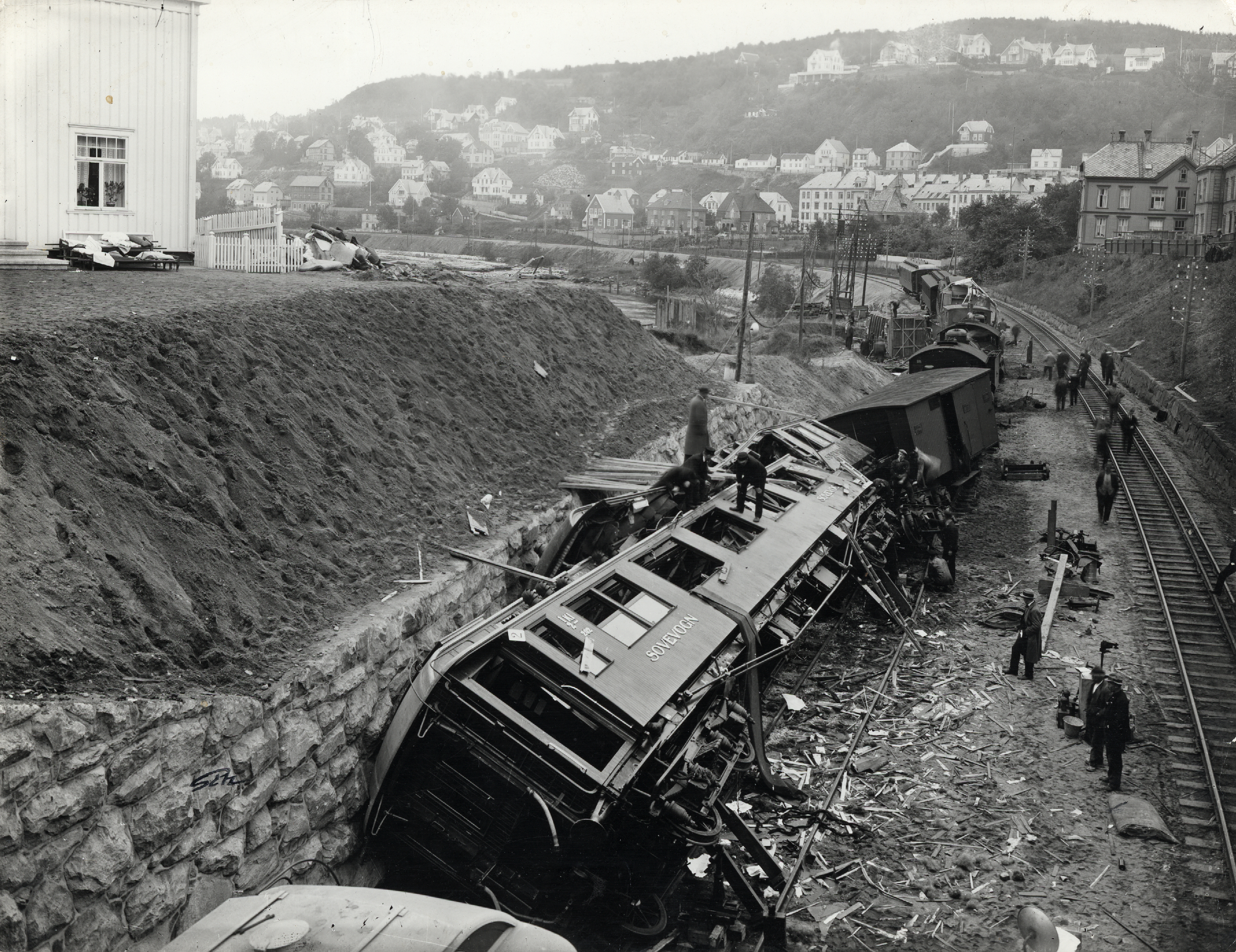
Photo of the train accident at Nidareid 1921

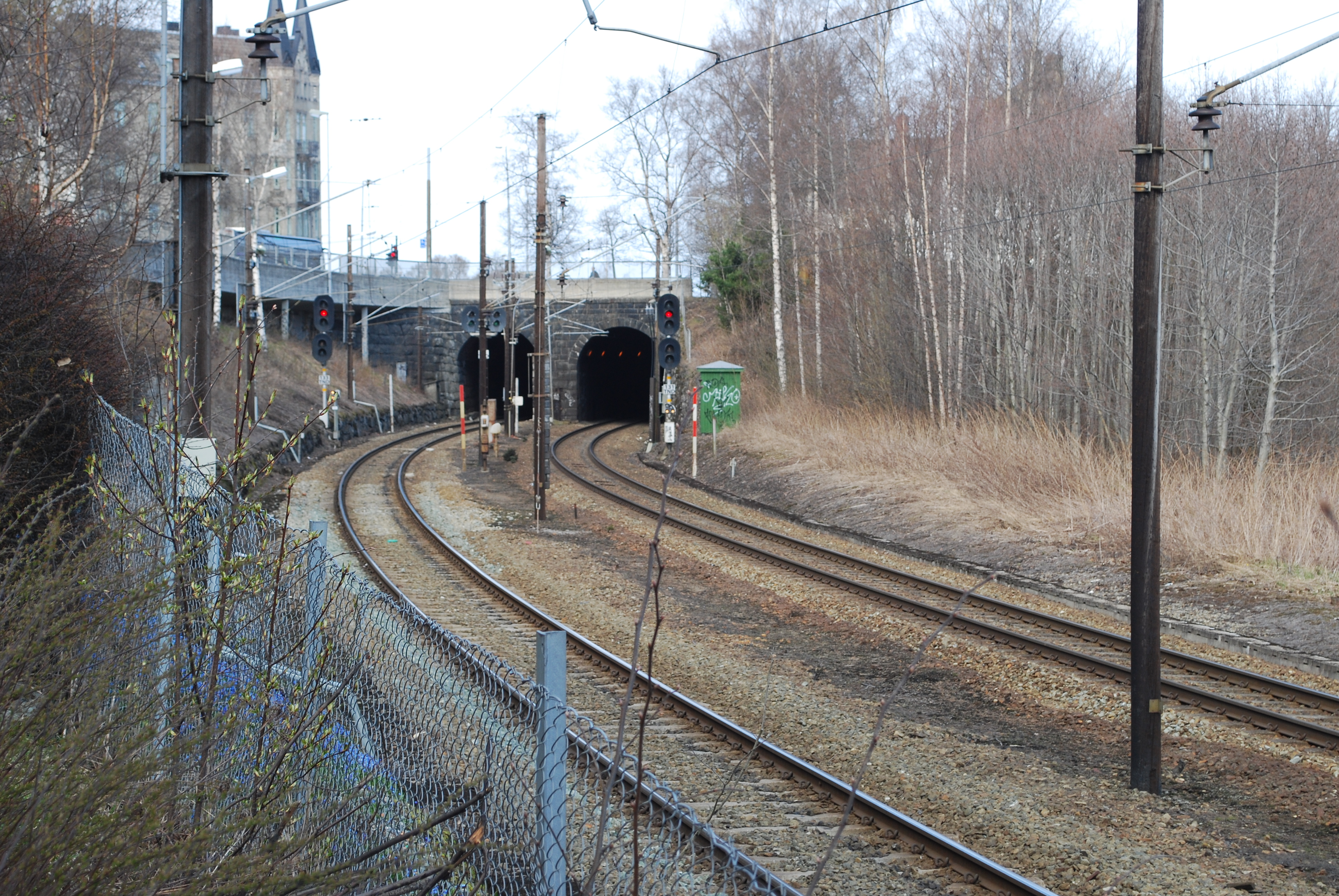
The Nidareid train disaster took place on the right hand track in this photo.

The Nidareid train disaster was a train collision on 18 September 1921 on the Trondhjem–Støren Line railway line, between the stations of Marienborg and Skansen in Trondheim, Norway. The accident occurred the day after the inauguration of the new line to Trondheim, Dovre Line, and one of the trains involved was the inaugural train returning from the celebrations in Trondheim. Six people (all prominent Norwegians) were killed in the crash, the first serious passenger train accident in Norway.

== Inaugural train ==
The inaugural train had on 17 September transported King Haakon VII and a retinue of followers including prominent politicians from the Norwegian government. The official opening had taken place at Hjerkinn Station which was the highest station on the line. Between there and Trondheim the inaugural train stopped at every station to give the king an opportunity to greet visitors and well-wishers. The train pulled into Trondheim that evening amidst great celebrations, and on Sunday, 18 September the celebrations continued.

== Extra train for the return ==
Although the king would spend a few days in Trondheim, most of the participants at the festivities had business and duties to attend to in Kristiania (now Oslo). An extra night train called "Litra D" was arranged for them. The local rail district wanted to schedule this train to depart Trondheim at midnight, just after a scheduled day train (no. 361) was set to arrive after a journey on the Røros Line. In order to get the honored guests home a few minutes earlier, the schedule was altered slightly, leaving Trondheim at 23:45, with the intention of meeting and passing no. 361 at Marienborg station.

The extra train consisted of six sleeping cars, sandwiched between a luggage car at the front and the conductor's car at the end. These had also been used in the inaugural train and had doubled as wardrobes for the guests at the line's inauguration. The train was hauled by two NSB Class 30b engines, 364 and 365. A total of 96 passengers were on board this train.

The train left Trondheim at 23:54, a few minutes behind schedule. It received an all clear signal as the train passed through Skansen station on its way back to Kristiania.

== Train no. 361 ==
The northbound train no. 361 was on a short hop from Støren to Trondheim. It was carrying passengers who had arrived on the 1,067 mm (3 ft 6 in) narrow-gauge Røros Line and changed trains for the final, 1,435 mm (4 ft 8 1/2 in) standard gauge, leg into Trondheim. This train was pulled by engine 182, an NSB Class 21a engine, at the front, and four carriages (a luggage car, a brake van, and two sitting carriages).

The crew of no. 361 had boarded at Tynset and been given briefings to inform them of trains which the northbound trains would be meeting en route during the coming week. Among these was an extra train, scheduled for "night to Monday the 19th", which all the crew assumed meant Monday night, that is, the next night.

Moving all the passengers over to the next train had delayed no. 361, and it was 20 minutes behind schedule when it pulled out of Støren, but with the improved track the driver hoped to make up the lost time. By the time the train reached Selsbak, where they were scheduled to meet southbound train no. 448, they were on schedule. As the train continued northwards the driver kept a lookout for signals on the left side, while the firemen was to look out for signals to the right.

== Marienborg ==
Marienborg Station was little more than a short stretch of double track to allow trains to pass each other (the facilities for passenger service was not opened before 1999). The only building at the location was a guards' cabin where the man in charge was to set the points and signal the trains in and out. Usually, there were two men stationed at Marienborg for the scheduled meetings which could be quite hectic for a single person to handle on his own, but on this night, only one person, Peter Wiig, was manning Marienborg for the meeting of trains Litra D and no. 361.

Wiig set the points to let no. 361 enter the passing loop, and set the signal there at danger, then set the points so that Litra D could pass through without trouble. Hoping to make the meeting as quick and clean as possible, and realizing that no. 361 might have trouble seeing all the signals and semaphores in the darkness, Wiig used his hand-held signal light to make sure that no. 361 would see an all-clear signal all the way into Marienborg, so that it would not stop prematurely outside the station and delay the meeting.

Train no. 361 slowed as it entered Marienborg, but then to Wiig's horror, the train passed the stop signal, continued through the station and exited on the north end without stopping. In the darkness, the crew on no. 361 had not realized that the green signal which would have marked an "all clear" out of Marienborg was missing, and that the semaphore had been set at "danger". The firemen had been distracted by a problem with the engines lubricator, and missed that they did not have "all clear" signals through Marienborg. The train manager in the first carriage was also supposed to look out for a manual signal by the station guard as they passed through Marienborg, but he had some trouble with opening and closing the window, and in the seconds lost fumbling with it, he failed to notice that there was no guardsman there. The driver did notice a jolt as the train drove against the points as they left the station, and slowed slightly to figure out what was going on.

Wiig desperately called the next station 900 m to the north, Skansen, ordering them to stop the extra train Litra D, but this train had already passed that station. Collision was now inevitable.

== Collision ==
The driver on no. 361 was the first to realize that they were on a collision course as he saw the lights of Litra D emerging from the tunnel. The driver of Litra D realized the same only a few seconds before impact. Litra D was in a tunnel and the headlight on the incoming train no. 361 was not particularly bright. When the driver of Litra D noticed what was happening, he also pulled the brakes to slow his train down. At 23:57, the two trains collided just after Litra D had emerged from the tunnel.

The large and heavy engines were damaged, but mostly in one piece, engine 182 which had hauled train no. 361 was the most severely damaged of these which sustained a destroyed cylinder. Behind no. 182, the conductor's carriage had been seriously damaged and the train manager was wounded. The great losses took place in the extra train Litra D. The luggage car running behind the two engines was tossed aside, but the second and third cars, sleeping carriages, had been crushed as they bored into one another and tipped over. Crushing of these two cars had dissipated most of the energy, and behind this the wreckage of these two cars, the train was mostly unharmed.

The collision had happened next to Hammer's villa, which was used as a temporary hospital for the injured during the night. The King, who remained in Trondheim and also visited the site that night, stayed there until half past four the following morning.

== Victims ==
The victims who died in the crash were all prominent guests to the inauguration of the Dovre Line.

- Captain Thoralf Bjørnstad was in the main board of Norwegian State Railways.
- Thomas Heftye who was a former Liberal Minister of Defence.
- Erik Glosimodt who was a railway architect who drew a number of the Norwegian railway stations, including the station building at Hjerkinn where the Dovre Line was officially opened.
- Railway engineer H.G. Hammer.
- Nils Johannes Sejersted was the director of "Norges Geografiske Oppmåling", now Statens kartverk, the official Norwegian map agency.
- Major N.C Ræder.

== Aftermath, investigation and trials ==
The line was cleared and reopened within the week. In the meantime, trains could use the old track which ran alongside the new track where the accident happened.

It was quickly determined that train no. 361 was supposed to wait at Marienborg for Litra D, and a question was then raised why the driver had not done so. Questions were also raised about the wisdom of putting so many important people on a single train, and of adding an extra train meeting on the schedule by pushing the departure time fifteen minutes forward.

Four people were charged with the accident and put on trial. These were the train manager Halvor Skott, engineer Martin Øien and fireman Karl Stuevold of train no. 361, as well as Peter Wiig who had manned Marienborg station and was supposed to manage the meeting of the trains there.

During the trial, some exonerating factors were presented. Although the crew of no. 361 were informed in the bulletin briefings at Tynset that there was an extra train scheduled to leave Trondheim, the wording used was "night to Monday". Although this phrasing is common in Norway today (it means "night between Sunday and Monday"), the term was new and rather unusual in 1921, and had never been used for trains leaving before midnight. The crew misinterpreted it, thinking that the bulletin was informing them of an extra train the following night.

All the four defendants from the Nidareid disaster were acquitted in February 1922. All of them continued to work on the railway, indeed Wiig who manned Marienborg was promoted to station master at another station and fireman Stuevold became a locomotive engineer a few years later.

The passengers on the extra train were generally well-insured and most of them eventually received compensation from their insurance companies. In a series of civil trials from 1924 to 1927, NSB was ordered to reimburse the insurance companies since the accident was due to mistakes from the railway company.

All the material involved, including the crushed sleeping carriages were eventually rebuilt. An enhanced security system was implemented at Marienborg in 1926.

The accident led to additional safety rules to reduce the amount of confusion which might happen. Many of the survivors of the crash were members of the Norwegian parliament (Stortinget), and were more than willing to grant funding for improved safety. The train engineer and train manager now had to have a conference about the upcoming journey. The rail schedule provided to the crew started to include the normal track which the train would enter.
