= Nils Johannes Sejersted =

Norwegian military officer

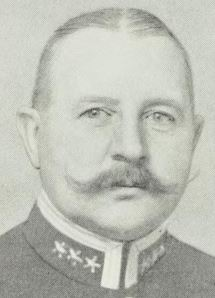
Nils J. Sejersted

Nils Johannes Sejersted (17 October 1865 – 19 September 1921) was a Norwegian military officer and director.

He was a son of Fredrik Christian Sejersted (1833–1882), Lieutenant Colonel and director of the Norwegian Mapping and Cadastre Authority (then known as Norges Geografiske Oppmåling). Himself, Nils Johannes Sejersted became director of Mapping and Cadastre Authority too, and held the military rank of colonel. He died in the Nidareid train disaster.

He was a grandfather of Francis Sejersted.
