= Christian's Church, Copenhagen =

Christians kirke
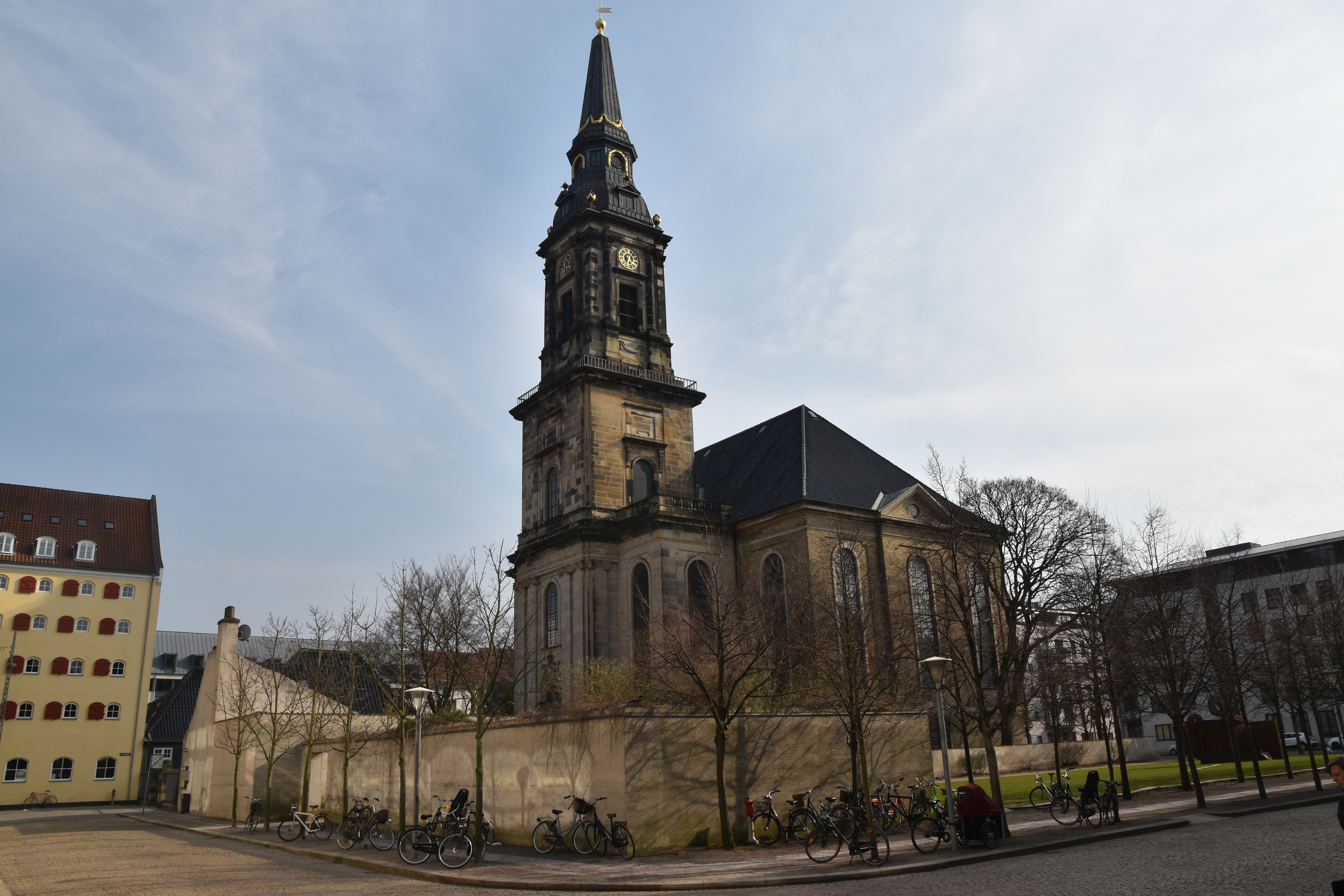
- Christian's Church
- Christians kirke
- 55°40′20.5″N 12°35′14″E
- Location: Christianshavn, Copenhagen
- Country: Denmark
- Denomination: Church of Denmark

History
- Status: Church

Architecture
- Architect: Nicolai Eigtved
- Architectural type: church
- Style: Rococo
- Completed: 1758

Specifications
- Height: 70 m (229 ft 8 in)
- Materials: Brick

Administration
- Diocese: Diocese of Copenhagen

Christians kirke (English: Christian's church) is a Rococo church in the Christianshavn district of Copenhagen, Denmark. Designed by Nicolai Eigtved, it was built between 1754 and 1759.

Formerly Frederiks tyske kirke (English: Frederiks German church), it was built by the German community as a church for their large community at Christianshavn, serving until the end of the 19th century. It then became a regular parish church for Christian's Parish within the Danish National Church. Its name is a reference to King Christian IV, who founded the Christianshavn district in 1611.

== History ==
=== Origins ===
After Christian IV founded Christianshavn in 1617 as a town specially for merchants, a large community of German traders and craftsmen settled there. Although Christianshavn had been incorporated into Copenhagen prior to 1674, they did not attend St. Peter's Church like the rest of the city's German community but preferred to worship at the local Church of Our Saviour. This lasted until they finally asked King Christian VI for permission to build their own church. The King approved the plans and contributed with a lot, a former saltern, located at the end of Strandgade in the southern part of the neighbourhood. He also granted permission for a lottery to be held to cover the project's financing; the finished church used to be colloquially known as the Lottery Church.

=== Construction phase ===
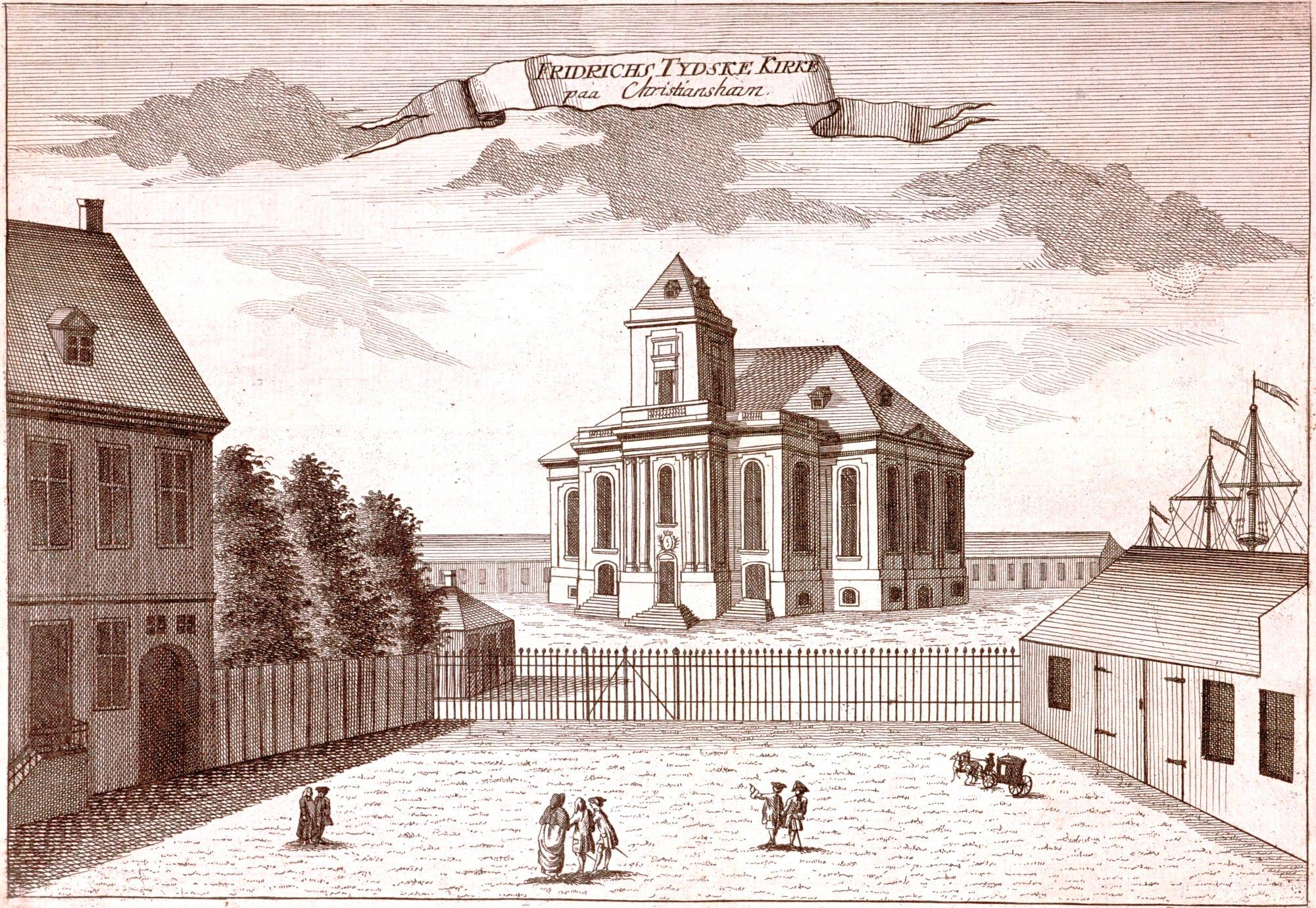
Frederich's Tydske Kirke paa Christianshavn

In return for his approval and donation of the lot, the king laid down very specific guidelines for the placement and design of the church building.

Nicolai Eigtved, the king's preferred architect at the time, was charged with the design of the new church but died in 1754, before construction started. His son-in-law, Royal Master Builder Georg David Anthon, was entrusted with supervising the construction of the church, which was completed in 1759. Anthon also designed the spire, an addition from 1769.

=== Frederick's German Church ===
The church was originally called Frederiks tyske kirke (English: Frederik's German church), and served its original purpose as a church for the German congregation until it was dissolved in 1886.

=== Later history ===
In 1901 the name of the church was changed to the current Christians kirke to complement and avoid confusion with Frederiks kirke in Frederiksstaden on the other side of the harbour, as well as to commemorate Christian IV, the founder of the Christianshavn area.

Since 1991 it has been a regular parish church for Christian's parish, which includes part of Christianshavn and Slotsholmen.

== Architecture ==
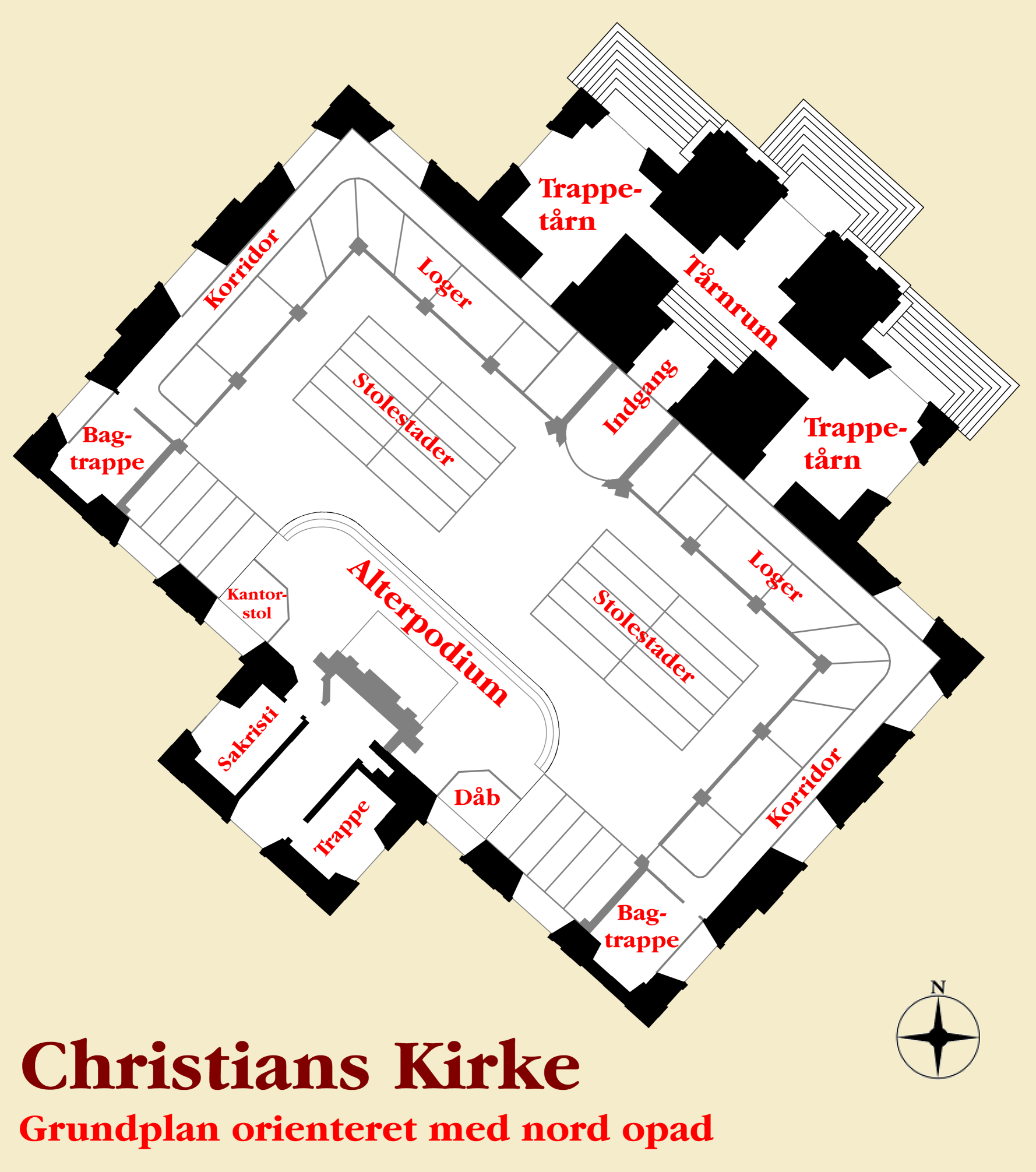
The unusual layout

The church has a rectangular layout, the nave occupying the space between the shorter rather than the longer sides of the rectangle, giving it exceptional width.

Standing on a granite plinth, the church is a yellow brick (Flensborg sten) building with sandstone finishing for the portal and tower. Ionic pilasters decorate the portal and the round-arched windows are tall and slender. The tower stands 70 metres high. Designed by Eigtved's son-in-law D. G. Anthon, the spire was added in 1769.

The tower is positioned at the centre of the northern side which serves as the main facade. It stands 70 metres high.

== Interior ==
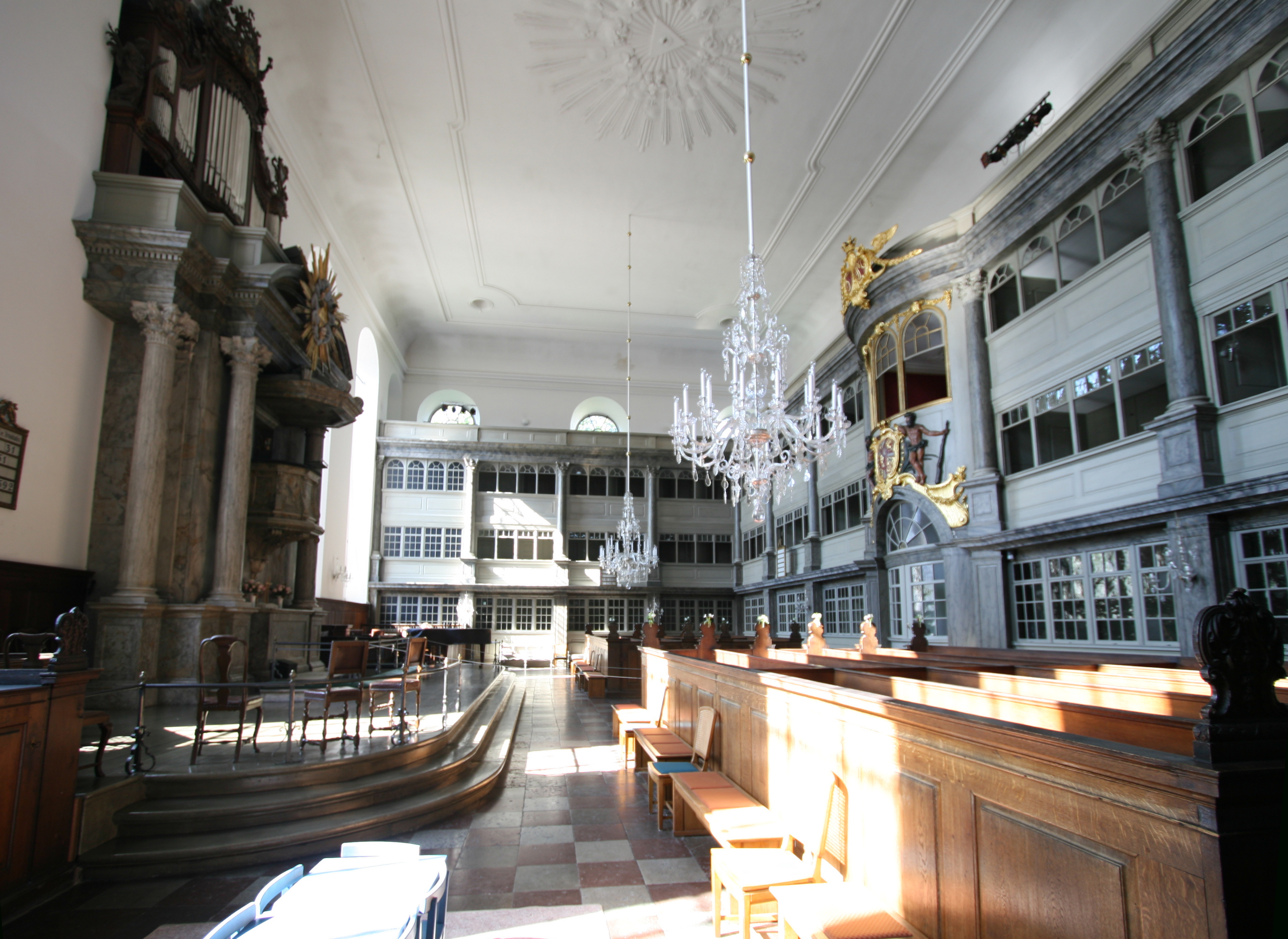
The church's interior, wider than it is long

The unusual interior of Christian's Church is reminiscent of a theatre. In addition to the benches on either side of the nave, three tiers of galleries complete with boxes rise the full height of the building on the northern, western and southern sides. They are all arranged to provide the congregation with an excellent view of the podium on the eastern side, which is reminiscent of a stage. It is dominated by the tall slender altarpiece, which consists not only of the altar table but also of the pulpit above it, and the organ at the very top. The ornate entrance, topped by the royal box, is opposite the altar and under the tower on the western side.

The organ stands in the integrated altarpiece above a clock face in the medieval tradition. The original instrument was built in 1759 by the leading authority of the day, Hartvig Jochum Müller. In 1917, I. Starup built a new pneumatic instrument on Müllers facade, and in 1976 the church acquired today's organ designed by P.-G. Andersen.

== The crypt ==
The church also has a large crypt covering the full area of the nave above. Divided into 48 burial chapels, it has been used for burials ever since the church's consecration in 1759 and is still in use today. The grave of Danish historian Peter Frederik Suhm is located there, alongside the graves of Karen Angell Suhm and their son, Ulrik. The rock and roll guitarist Link Wray was buried there in 2005.

=== Burials ===
- Peter Ascanius (1723–1803), naturalist
- Johan Christian Just vong Berger (1723–1791), physician
- Vigilius Eriksen (1722–1782), painter
- Carl Emil Fenger (1814–1884), physician and politician
- Carl Ludvig Carlach (1832–1893), composer, opera singer and educator
- Leocadie Gerlach (1826–1919), opera singer
- Julie Hansen (1835–1895), actress
- Peter Nicolai Heering (1838–1924), businessman
- Jacob Holm (1770–1845), businessman
- Simon Hooglant (1712–1789), vice admiral
- Knud Schroeder (1977–1955), sculptor and professor
- Simon Carl Stanley (1703–1776), sculptor
- Peter Frederik Suhm (1728–1798), historian and collector
- Cleophas Svenningsen (1801–1853), educator
- Anker Sørensen (1926–2010), filmmaker
- Johan Friederich Wewer (1699–1759), merchant and ship-owner (moved from Church of Holmen)
- Link Wray (1929–2005), singer, songwriter and guitarist
- Johann Ludvig Zinn (1734–1802), merchant

== The "Theatre Church" ==
As a result of its design, the church has often been called the Theatre Church. It has lived up to this name, as it can house up to a thousand people, not just for church services but for the many concerts and other artistic arrangements which have been held there in recent years. One of the advantages of its design is that it does not look empty even if only a few people attend such events.

== Gallery ==
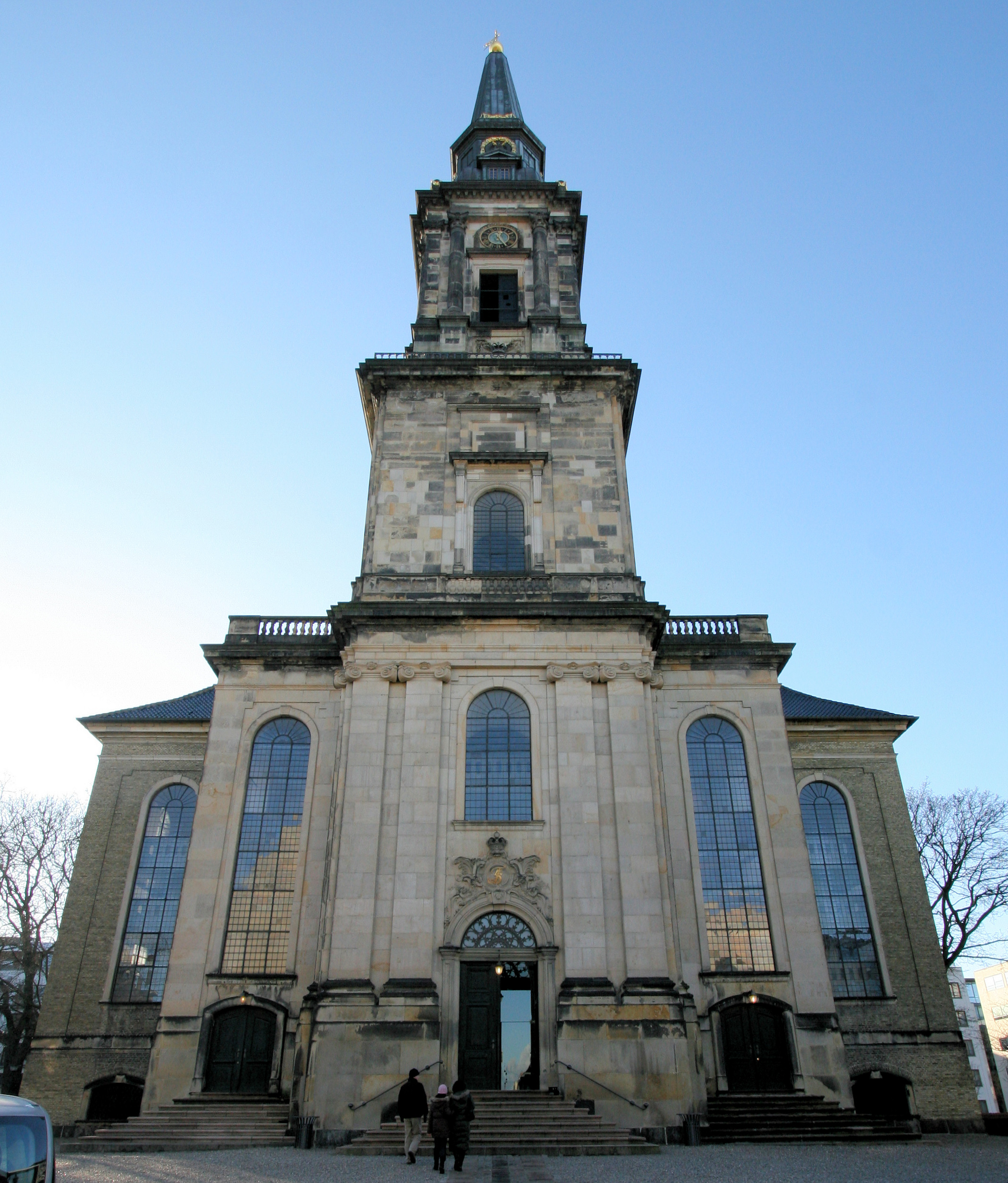
Main facade on the western side

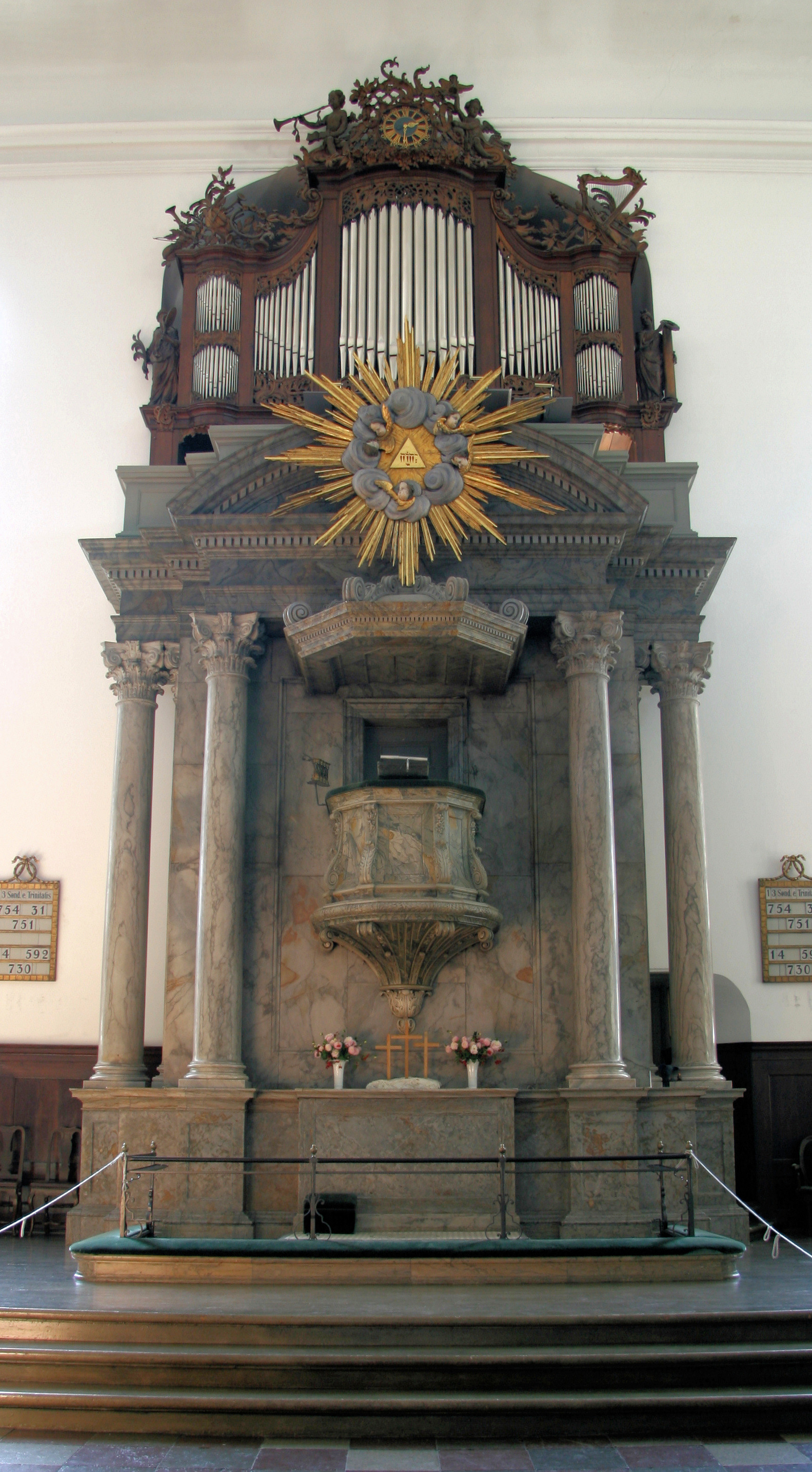
The altar topped by the pulpit and organ

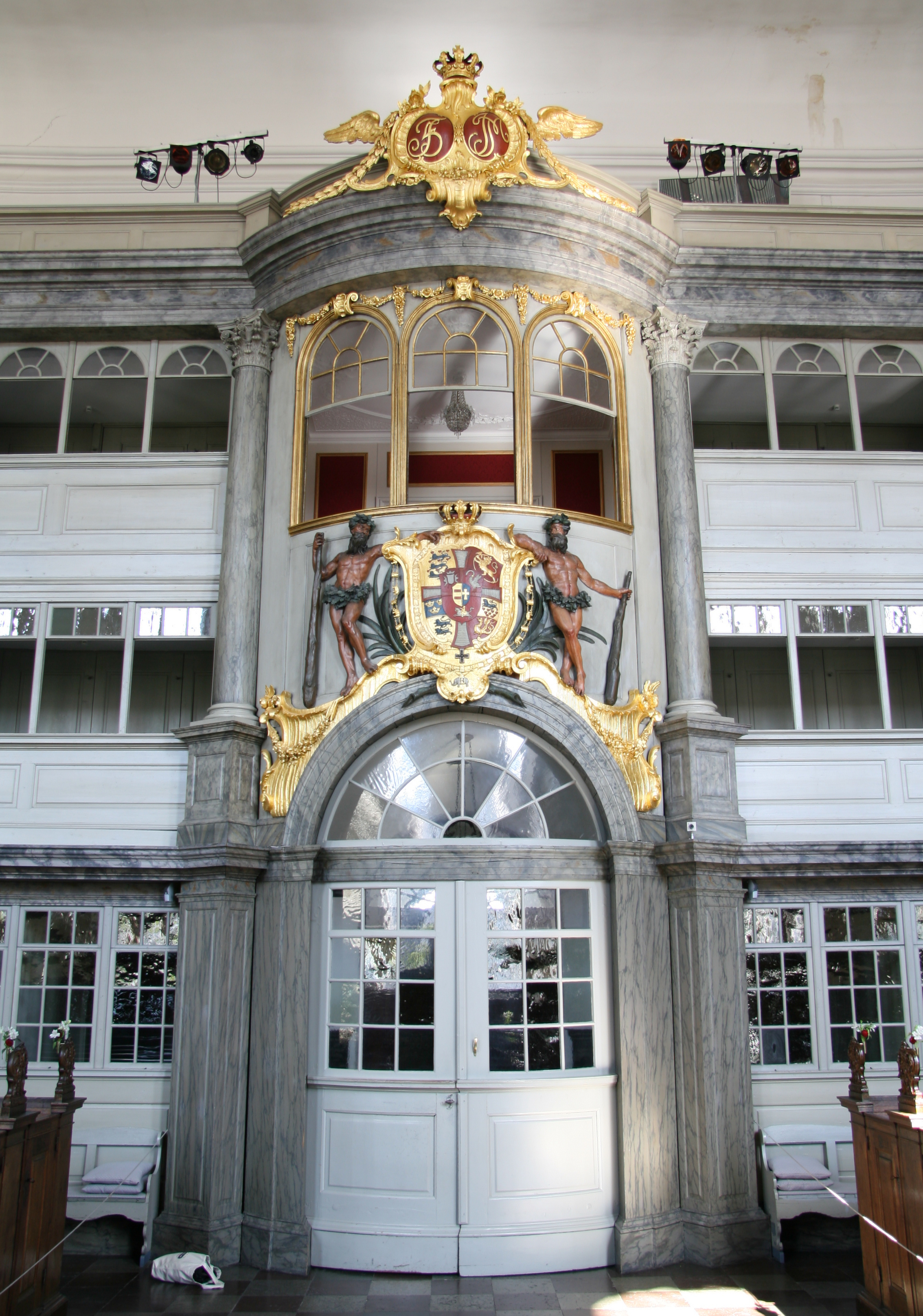
Entrance and royal box

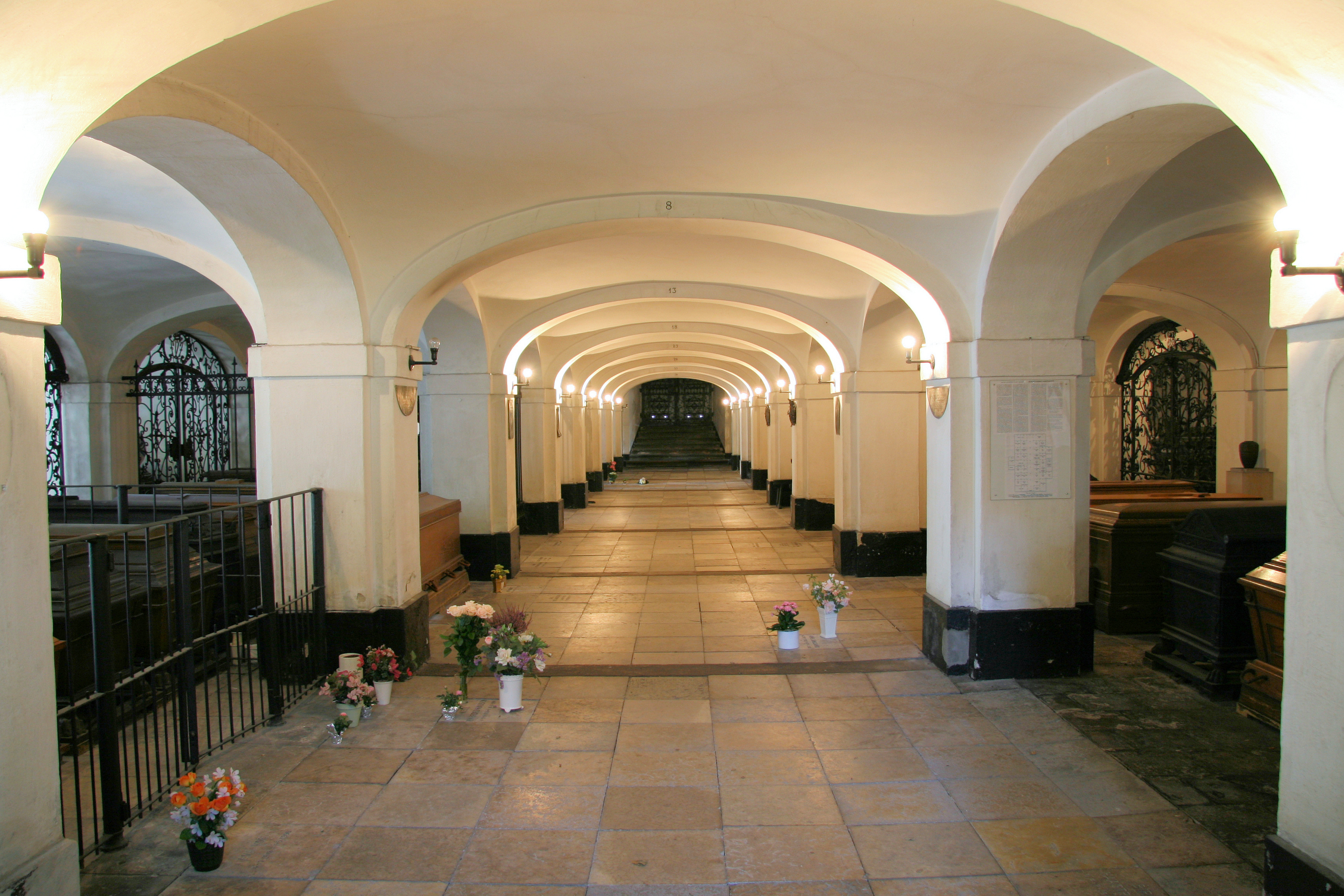
The crypt
