= Vinstradalen =

Valley in Trøndelag, Norway

Geology
- Type: River valley

Geography
- Location: Trøndelag, Norway
- Coordinates: 62.45547°N 9.66868°E

Location
- Interactive map of the valley

Vinstradalen is a river valley in Oppdal Municipality in Trøndelag county, Norway. The valley branches off the main Drivdalen valley, just south of the village of Driva.
