= Karen Angell =

Norwegian heiress, writer (1732–1788)

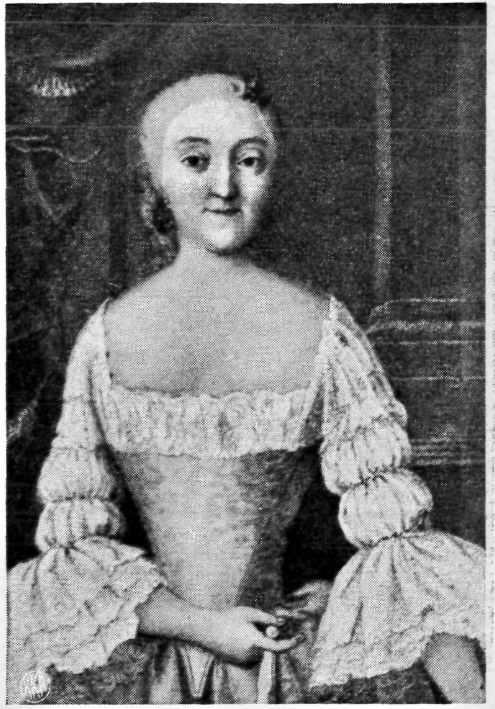
- Angell (1909)
- Born: Trondheim, Norway; 16 May 1732
- Died: 11 July 1788 (aged 56); Øverød, Denmark
- Burial place: Christian's Church, Copenhagen, Denmark
- Spouse: Peter Frederik Suhm
- Children: 1

Karen Angell (1732 – 1788) was the daughter of a Norwegian merchant, an influential heiress and the richest woman in the city of Trondheim. Her crypt is featured in Christian's Church, Copenhagen, Denmark.

== Biography ==
Karen Angell was born 16 May 1732 in Trondheim, Norway, the daughter of the merchant and government councilor Lorentz Angell (1692–1751) and his wife Sara Collet (1702–1756). Her father's brother was the wealthy merchant Thomas Angell who ran a profitable business with Lorentz.

Karen was her parents' only surviving child (her sister Sara had died at a young age) and was raised in Trondheim. She learned German and French, played the harpsichord and danced, but above all, she was raised to lead a reverent and Christian life.

=== The city's rich daughter ===
Her parents' wealth attracted many suitors for Karen. On 29 July 1751, after her father had died, she became engaged to a distant relative, Peter Frederik Suhm from Copenhagen, Denmark. The wedding took place on 19 April 1752. The marriage was allowed on the condition that Karen and Peter Suhm would live in Trondheim until the death of Karen's mother, which Peter Suhm was obligated to do in order to be able to access his wife's dowry. After her mother's death, Karen became the sole heir of 300,000 riksdaler.

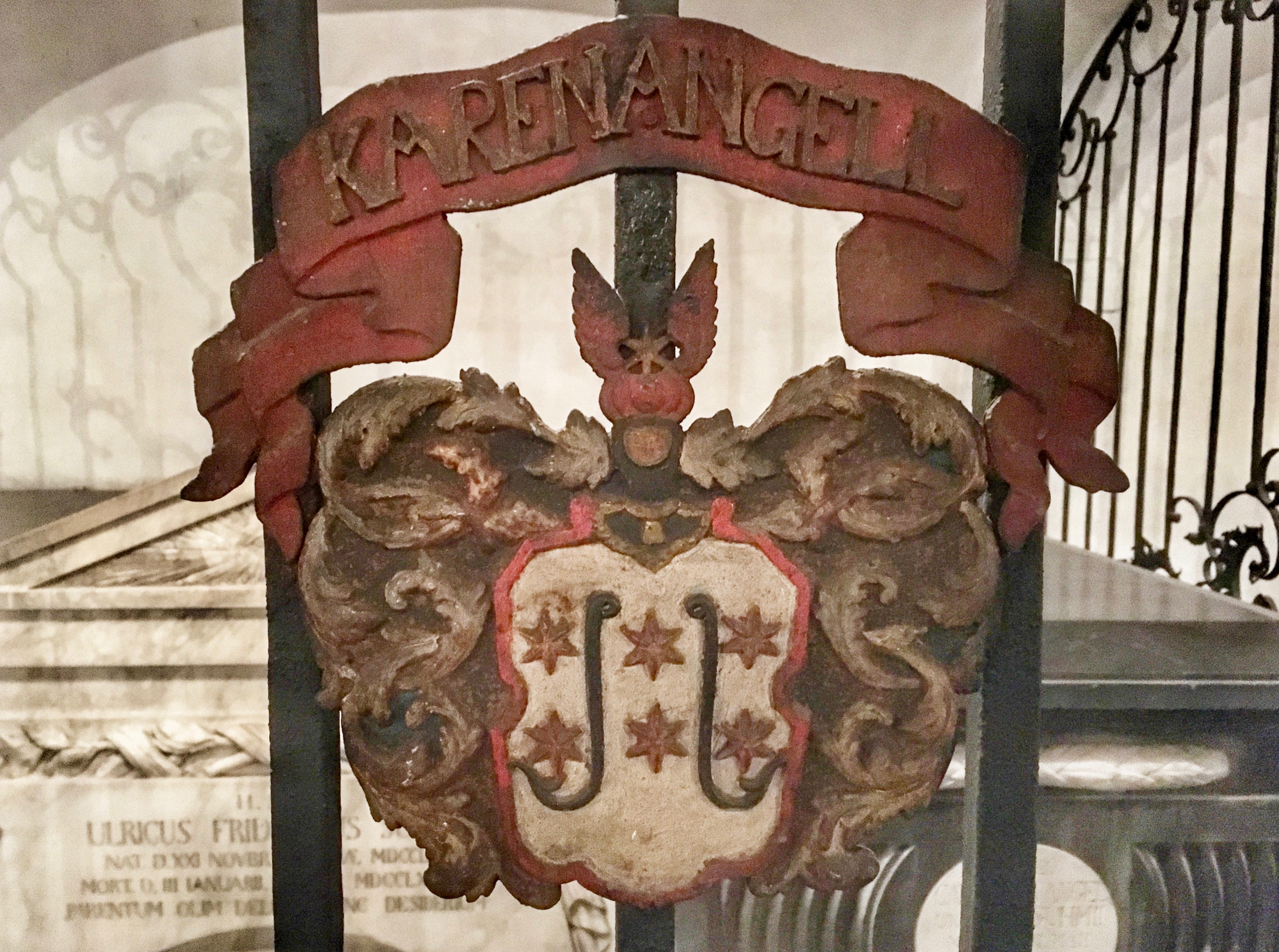
Angell's coat of arms showing two fish hooks.

Karen Suhm became the richest woman in the city, and the couple had a large house in the city and a stately farm in the country. The couple had hoped that Karen would also inherit a significant amount from her father's very wealthy brother Thomas Angell, but for his own reasons, Thomas chose to donate large parts of that estate to social causes instead.

Peter became an acclaimed historian and continued his pursuit of science and, in 1760, co-founded the Royal Norwegian Society of Sciences and Letters in Trondheim. In the autumn of 1761, their son Ulrik Frederik Suhm was born. In 1765, the small family moved to Copenhagen, where Peter Suhm was able to collect more books and publish his writings. Karen Suhm enjoyed reading in several languages, including religious and moral as well as humorous and witty literature. Outside the city in Øverød, they bought a large house and kept a country estate. Karen was a serious homeowner and took care of most of the household, even when buildings needed to be erected, "to the great joy of her husband, who, instead of practical chores, could devote all his time to his studies."

In 1778, Karen and Peter were grief-stricken when their teenage son died unexpectedly after a cold. Karen eventually lost the desire to pursue her daily activities. She died ten years later at 56, on 11 July 1788. Her epitaph was written by her husband: "Unusual and manly courage, tireless hard work and with unparalleled order in all things."

=== Legacy ===
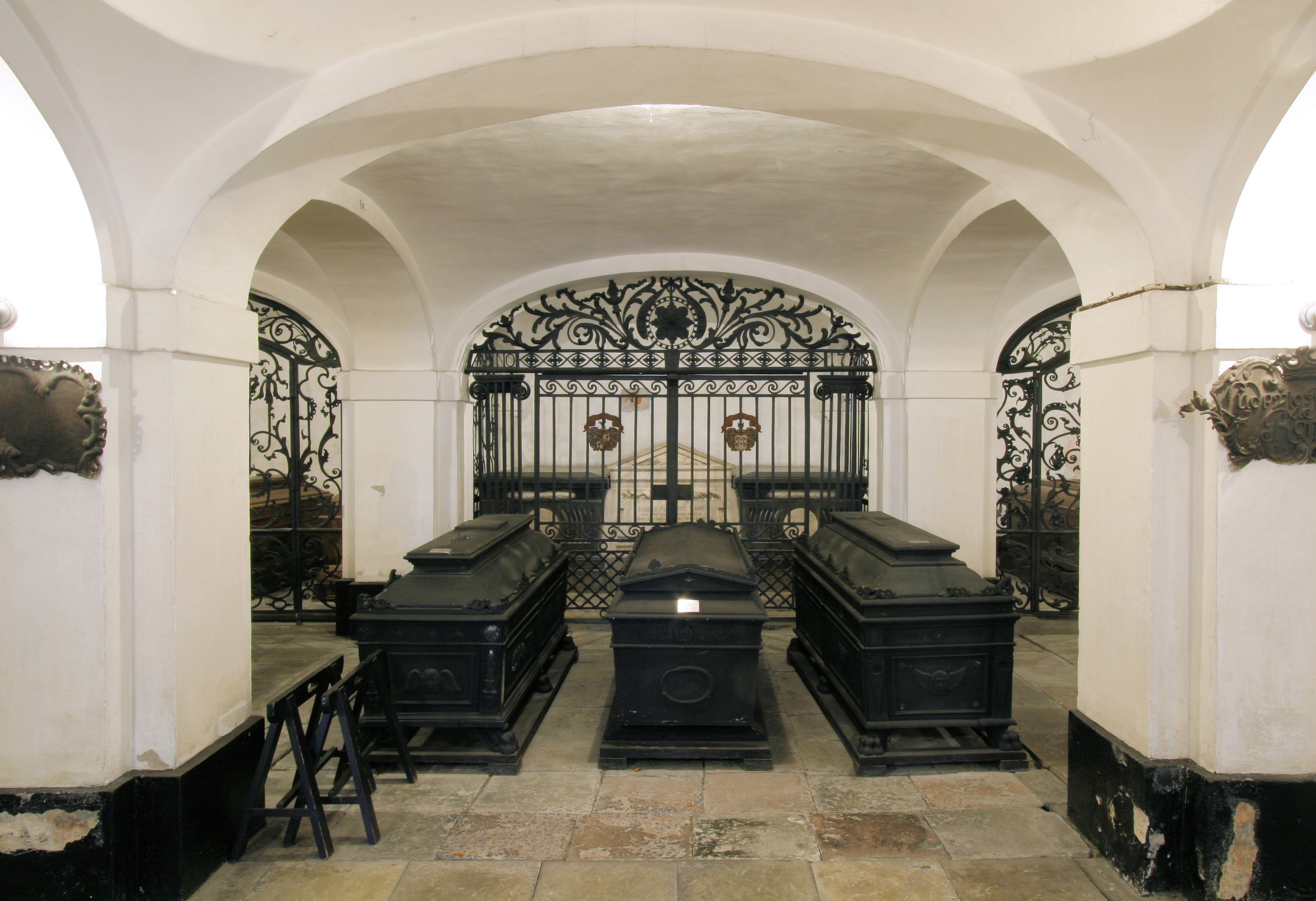
Suhm family crypt under Christian's Church holding the remains of Karen, Peter and son Ulrik between them.

Peter Suhm arranged for their burial in the crypt under Christian's Church, Copenhagen. There, the couple lie in black marble coffins on either side of their son's coffin, behind wrought iron grilles with the couple's coat of arms. An accompanying display showing three portrait reliefs, made of Gjellebæk marble and Italian white marble, has since been moved up into the church. Suhm also had the medalist Daniel Adzer carve a medal with his wife's features in profile and minted 40 copies in silver and two in gold. Suhm later distributed the commemorative medals to his friends at Christmas and New Year.

The Royal Library in Copenhagen keeps on restricted loan a handcrafted cookbook manuscript, written by Karen Suhm.
