= Kongsvoll Station =

Railway station in Oppdal, Norway

Kongsvoll
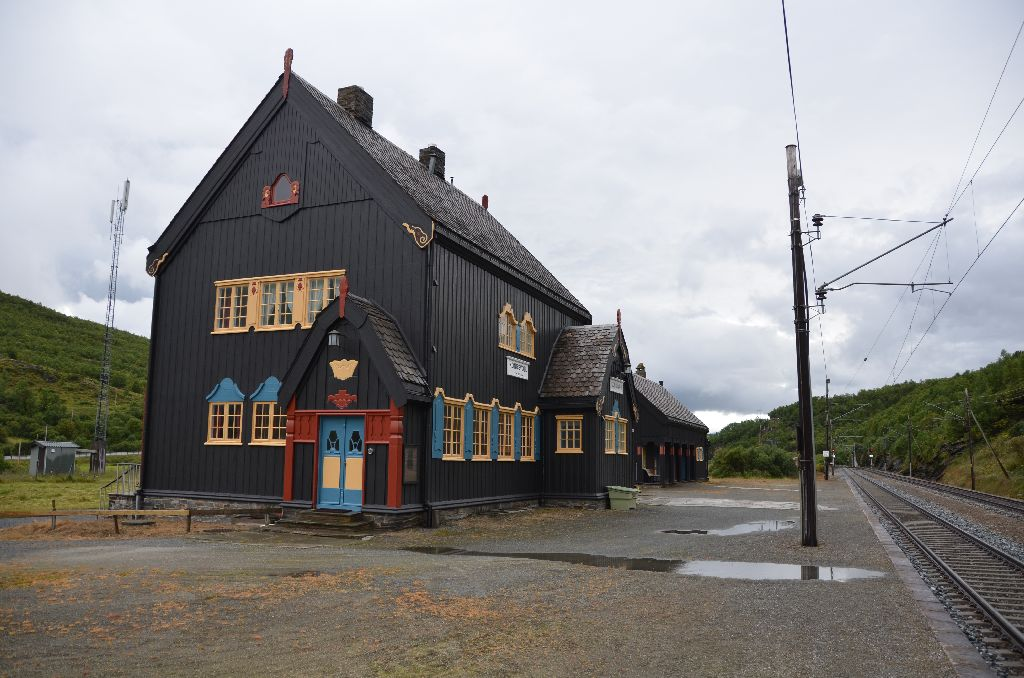
- View of the station

General information
- Location: Kongsvoll; Oppdal Municipality, Trøndelag; Norway
- Coordinates: 62.3070°N 09.6062°E
- Elevation: 886.5 m (2,908 ft)
- System: Railway station
- Owner: Bane NOR
- Operator: SJ Norge
- Line: Dovrebanen
- Distance: 393.23 km (244.34 mi)
- Platforms: 1

Construction
- Architect: Erik Glosimodt

History
- Opened: 1921
Location
- Location within Trøndelag Location within Norway

Kongsvoll Station (Norwegian: Kongsvoll stasjon) is a railway station located at Kongsvoll in Oppdal Municipality in Trøndelag county, Norway. It's located in the Drivdalen valley, along the Driva river and the European route E06 highway.

The station is located along the Dovre Line and is served by four daily express trains to Oslo and Trondheim. The unstaffed station is located in the mountains, outside of civilization, with no permanent population close by. The station is used to access the mountain hiking and skiing areas around, as well as the Kongsvoll hotel.

== History ==
The station was designed by Erik Glosimodt and opened in 1921 as part of the Dovre Line when it was extended from Dombås to Trondheim. The wooden station was preserved as a cultural heritage in 1997.

Preceding station	Express trains	Following station
Hjerkinn towards Oslo S	F6	Oppdal towards Trondheim S
