= Erik Glosimodt =

Norwegian architect (1881–1921)

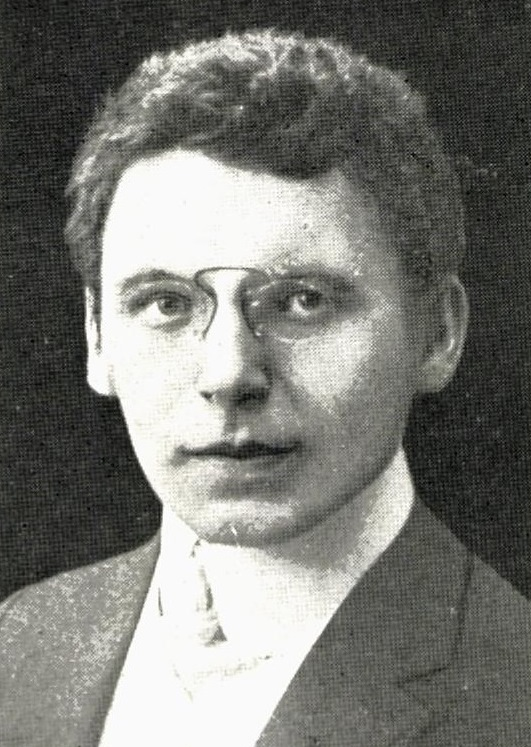
- Born: Erik Waldemar Glosimodt; 19 December 1881; Oslo, Norway
- Died: 18 September 1921 (aged 39); Trondheim, Norway
- Occupation: Architect

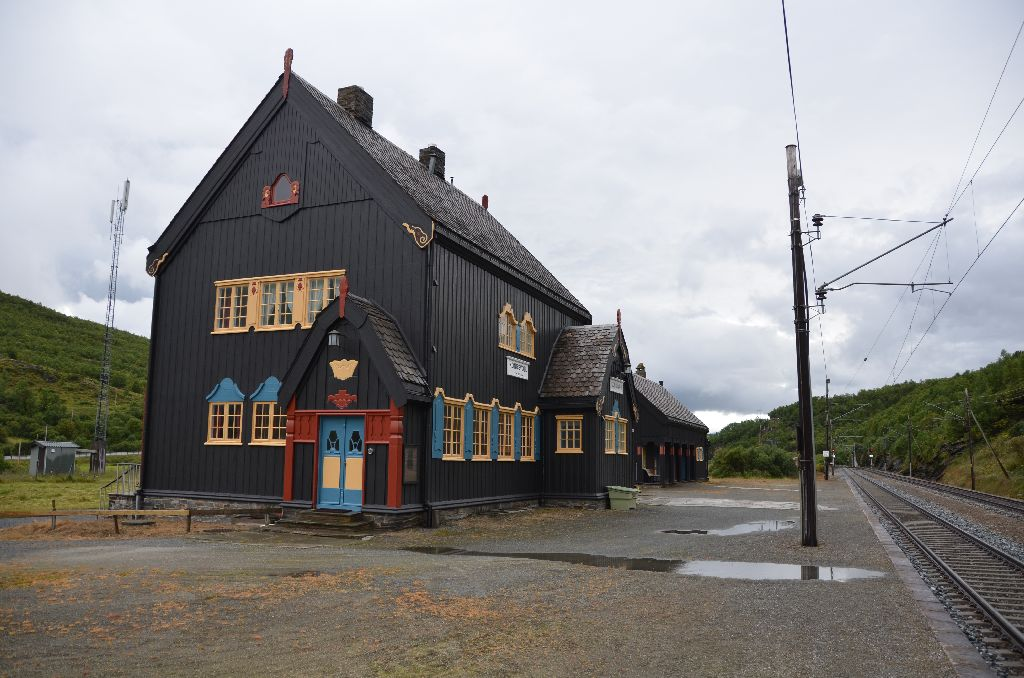
Kongsvoll Station

Erik Waldemar Glosimodt (19 December 1881 – 18 September 1921) was a Norwegian architect. He is best known for drawing many railway stations, among others the preserved Kongsvoll Station.

Glosimodt was born in Oslo, Norway. He studied under Herman Major Schirmer at The Royal School in Christiania (now Oslo). He further his architectural education at the Art Academy in Copenhagen under professor Martin Nyrop. As a trained architect, Glosimodt worked with Ole Sverre (1865–1952) from 1904 to 1907. In 1911, he established his own practice in Christiania. Glosimodt died in the Nidareid train disaster (Nidareid-ulykken) at the age of 39.
