= Kongsvoll =

Mountain lodge in Trøndelag, Norway

Coordinates: 62°18′11″N 09°36′21″E

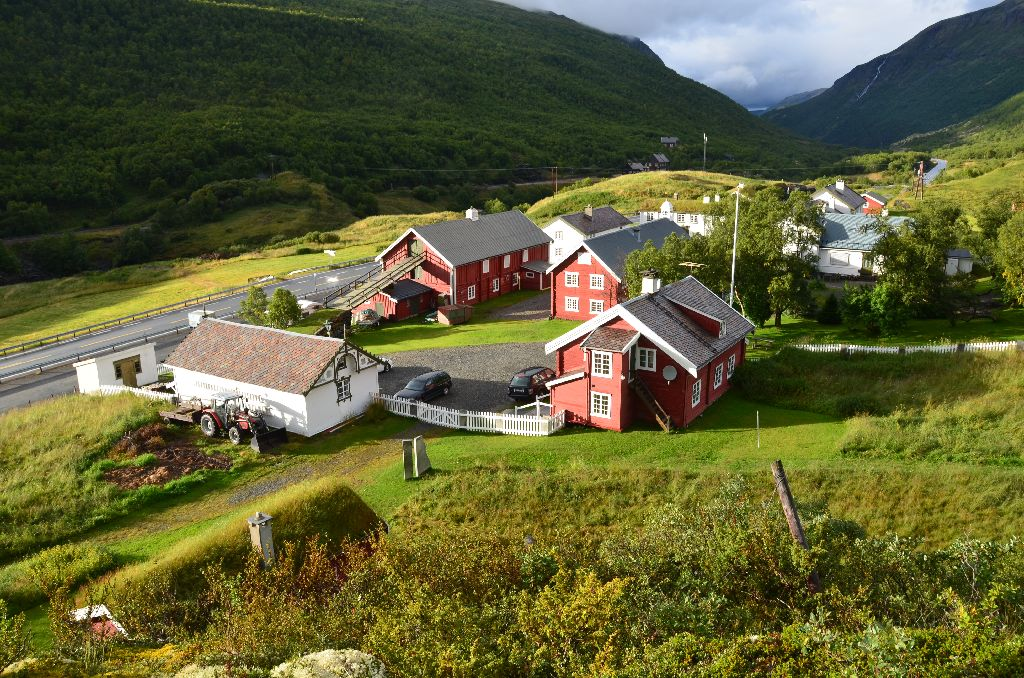
Kongsvold Fjeldstue

Kongsvoll (historic: Kongsvold Fjeldstue) is a historic mountain lodge built on the site of a former inn located in the Drivdalen valley in Oppdal Municipality in Trøndelag county, Norway. The original inn dated to the 12th century. The oldest buildings of the present mountain lodge date from the 18th century.

Nearby is found the Kongsvoll Alpine Garden of NTNU.

== Background ==
Kongsvold Fjeldstue is located along the Pilgrim´s Route (Norwegian: Pilegrimsleden) and Old Kings' Road (Norwegian: Kongeveien) between the cities of Oslo and Trondheim. During his reign, King Eystein I of Norway ordered the construction of mountain stations (Norwegian: fjellstue) along the route that pilgrims followed in visiting the shrine of St. Olav in Trondheim. These stations, including Kongsvoll, were inns where pilgrims crossing the mountain passes could find food and shelter. This one was built along the Driva river in what is now Oppdal Municipality.

The oldest buildings presently at the site date from 1720. The original inn was located about 2 kilometres (1.2 mi) from where the lodge is now located. In 1701, a landslide damaged the inn. This resulted in a decision to move Kongsvold to the current location. In 1712, construction of the new Kongsvold lodge was started, but during the Great Northern War, Kongsvold and the other mountain lodges in the Dovre Region were burned. Reconstruction of the lodge began in 1720.

During the period 1979–1990, there was major restoration work completed on the historic lodge. The lodge has an exhibition about the history of the area and a collection of historical artifacts from the operation of the former inn. The Kongsvoll railway station is located 500 metres (1,600 ft) from Kongsvoll.
