= Hauser Plads 16 =

Listed building in Copenhagen

- Hauser Plads 16
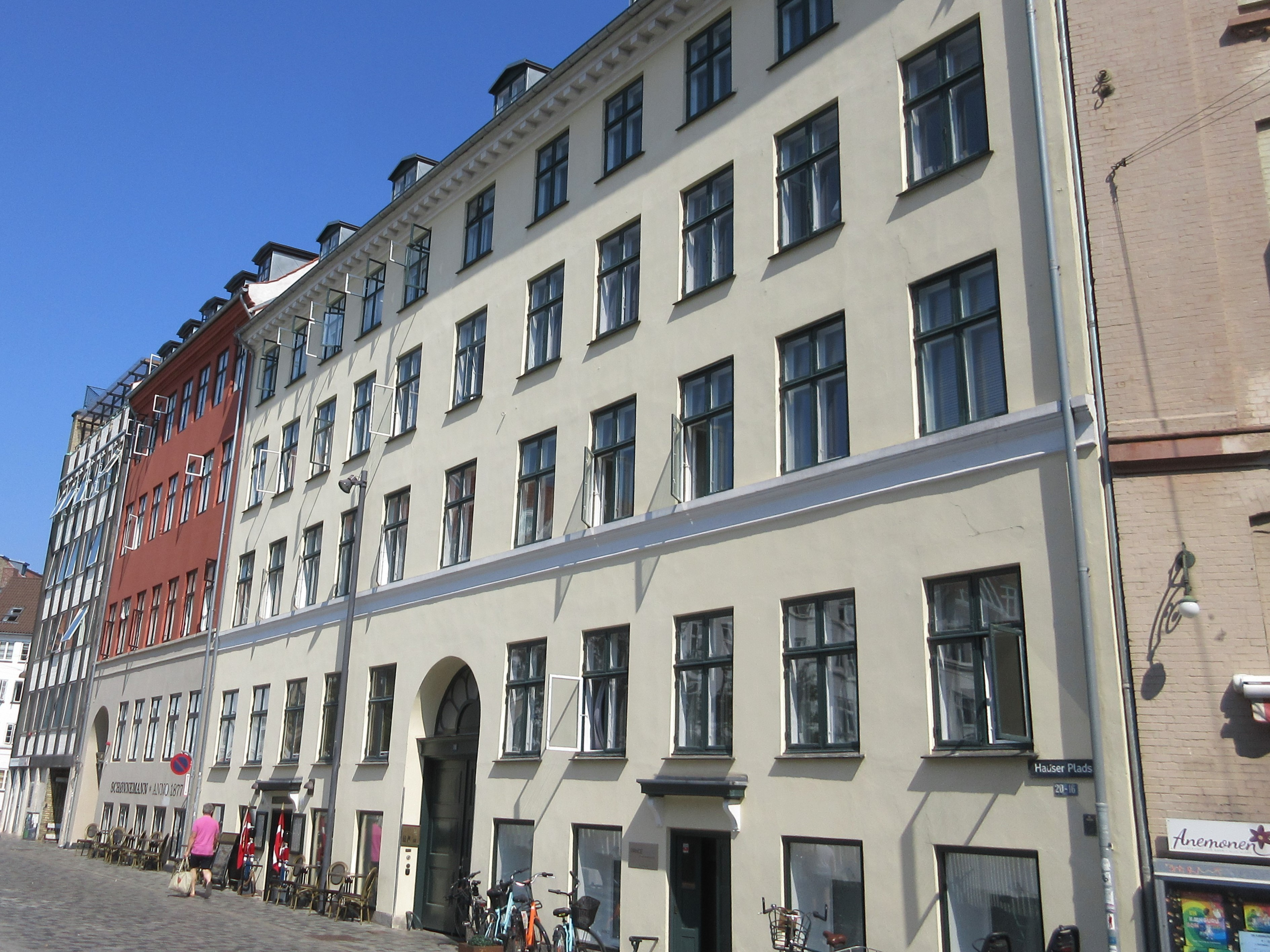
- Hauser Plads 16 in August 2022.
- Interactive map of the Hauser Plads 16 area

General information
- Location: Copenhagen, Denmark
- Coordinates: 55°40′57.86″N 12°34′34″E
- Completed: 1739

Hauser Plads 16 is an 11-bays-wide, mid 19th-century building situated on the east side of Hauser Plads in the Old Town of Copenhagen, Denmark. The building was listed in the Danish registry of protected buildings and places in 1945. Notable former residents include writer and educator Harald Valdemar Rasmussen (1821–1891) and painter Julius Exner. Restaurant Schønnemann, one of Copenhagen's oldest traditional lunch restaurants, known for its smørrebrød and large selection of Snaps, has been located in the basement since 1901.

== History ==
=== Early history ===
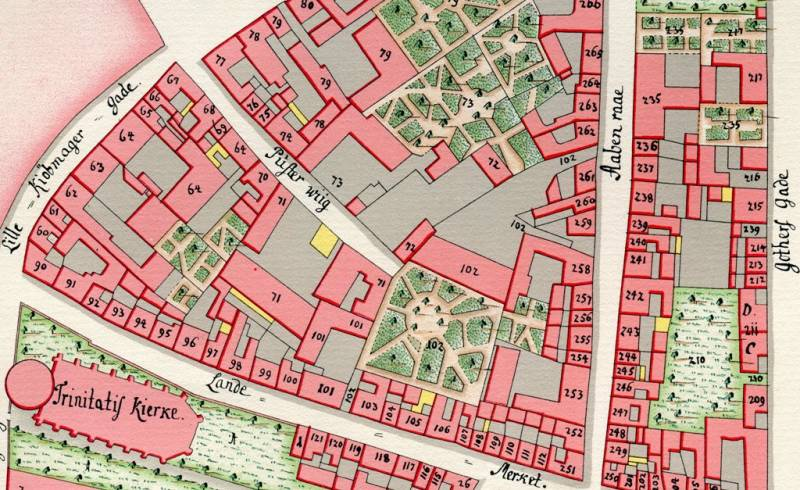
No. 102 seen on a detail from Gedde's map of Rosenborg Quarter, 1757.

The site was formerly part of a much larger property, listed in Copenhagen's first cadastre of 1689 as No. 113 in Rosenborg Quarter and owned by stiftsskriver Claus Toft at that time. The property was listed in the new cadastre of 1756 as No. 102 and was then owned by merchant Just Fabritius.

The property was listed in the new cadastre of 1806 as No. 221, It was owned by Franz Nachtegall at that time. His property was the following year destroyed in the British bombardment of the city. In 1818, No. 221 was divided into No. 221A and No. 221B. In 1825, No. 221V was again divided into No. 221B and No. 221C. In 1830, No. 221C was divided into No. 221 C and No. 221D. No. 221D is the property now known as Hauser Plads 16. The present building was constructed for distiller Ole Møller in 1830.

=== 1845 census ===
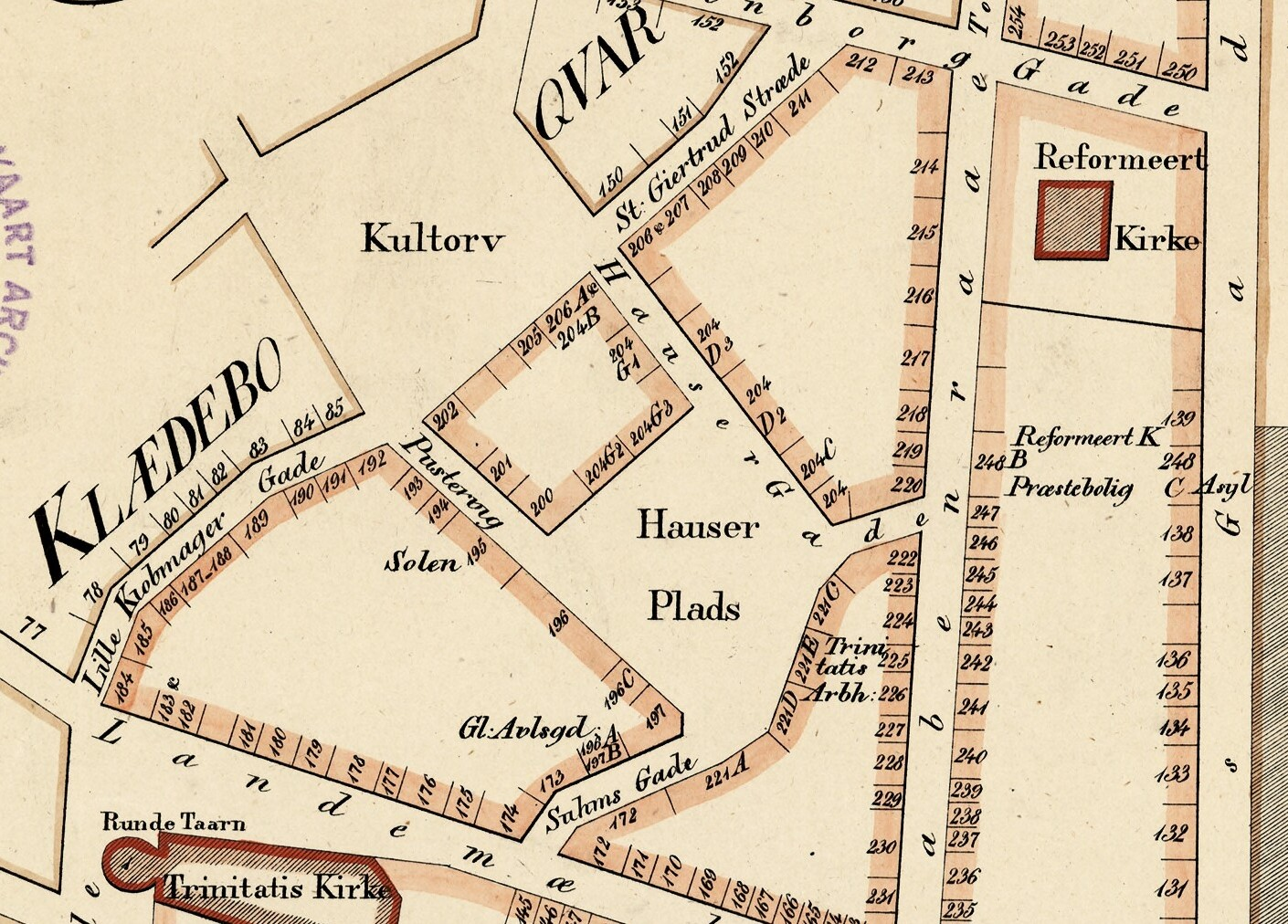
No. 221D seen on a detail from a cadastral map of Rosenborg Quarter, 1841..

The property was home to a total of 84 residents at the time of the 1845 census. Abigael Henriette Rønne (née HackI, widow of Chancery secretary Christian Frederik Rønne, resided in the ground floor apartment to the left with the sistersElisa Clemmensen and Margaritha Clemmensen (aged 26 and 19, lodgers) and one maid. Andreas Thomsen, a 65-year-old widower, resided on the ground floor to the right with one maid and three lodgers. Hans Frederik von Antzée, a retired military officer, resided in one of the first floor apartments with his wife Christiane Antzée (née Møller) and one maid. Ane Dorthea Barner (née van der Maase), a 57-year-old widow, resided in the other first floor apartment with the brothers Rasmus Christian Rasmussen (22, theology student) and Carl Wilhelm Rasmussen (17, clerk), one maid and one lodger. Harald Waldemar Rasmussen (1821-1891), a later professor of theology, shared one of the third floor apartments with the sailor Rudolph Emmerich Arnold Rasmussen, Christiane Thrane (née Møller) and her two foster children (named Thrane, aged 11 and 13) and one maid. Johan Larsen, a joiner, resided in one of the two second floor apartments with his wife Marie Nicoline Larsen and their three children (aged four to six). Frederikke Koch, a 51-year-old widow with a pension, resided in the other second floor apartment with one maid. Agnes Keck, a widow supplementing her pension with needlework, resided on the third floor to the left with her two children (aged seven and nine), four lodgers and one maid. Morten Andersen, the proprietor of a tavern in the basement, resided in the associated dwelling with his wife Maren Christensen, their 13-year-old daughter and three lodgers.

=== 20th century ===
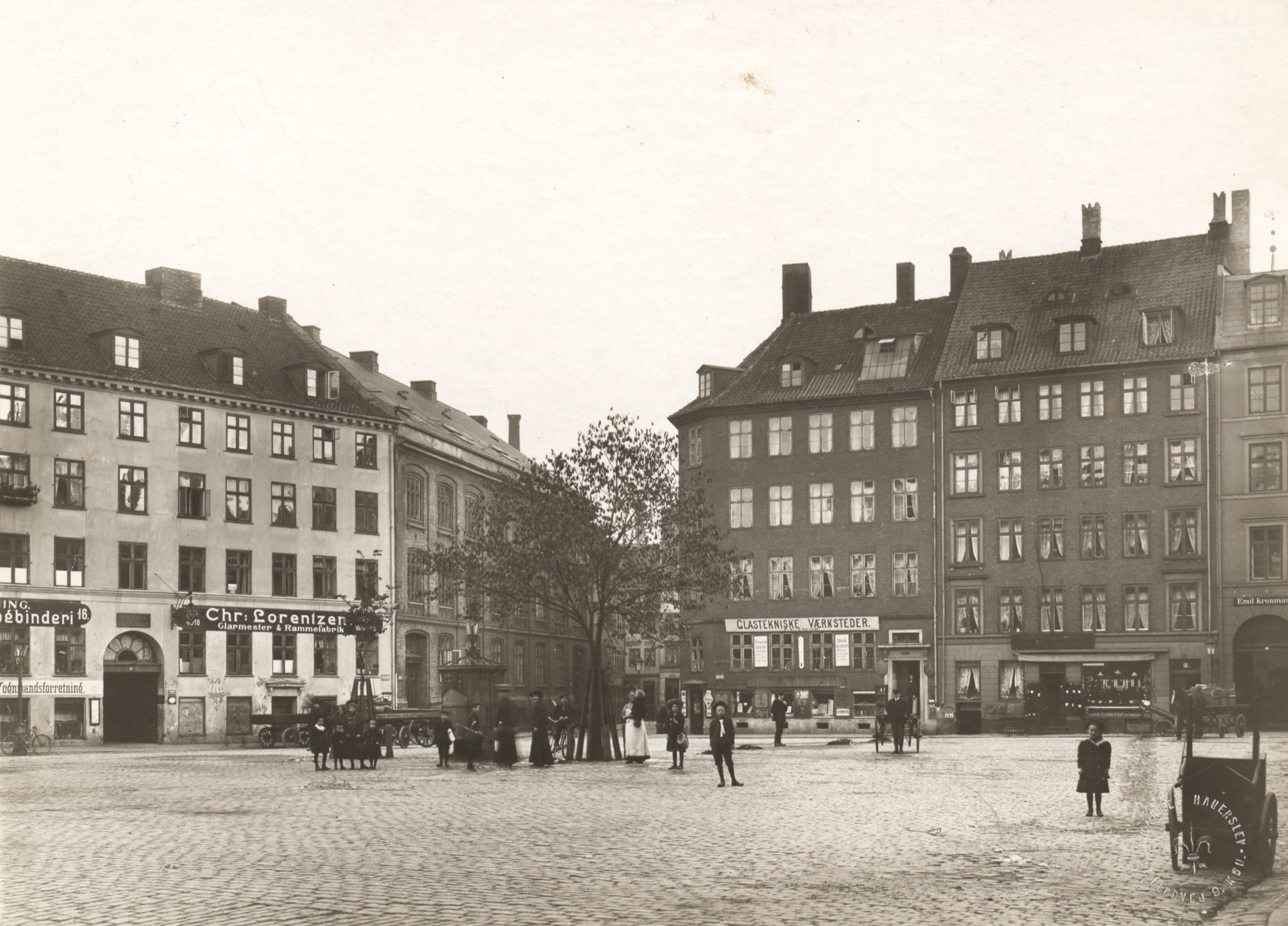
No. 16 viewed to the left on a photo by Hohannes Hauerslev from the 1910s.

A haulier's business in the building was around the turn of the century taken over by Peter Frederiksen. In 1901, he and his wife Augusta opened a restaurant in the basement. The restaurant—which was then called Café Hauser Plads—had been founded by his parents Frederik and Marie Henriksen on the other side of the square (in the basement of No 11, now demolished) back in 1877. Peter Frederiksen had returned to Hauser Plads to assist his mother in the restaurant after his father's death in the early 1880s. The restaurant catered to the many farmers and coalers who visited the city on market day to sell their produce and charcoal on nearby Kultorvet and the city's other marketplaces, leaving their carriages and horses on Hauser Plads.

The property was home to 43 residents at the time of the 1906 census. Peter and Augusta Frederiksen resided on the first floor with their six children (aged five to 16), two maids and one lodger (stablemaster). Their apartment was located above the restaurant. A spiral staircase, disguised as a cupboard, provided direct access between the restaurant and the apartment. Carl Levisohn (1857-1938), owner of a leather business founded by his father in 1867 (the company was as I. & O. Lisfeldt based at Gammel Mønt 39 in 1950), resided in the building with his wife Martha Ingeborg Levisohn, their two-year-old son Jens Bernhard Vilhelm Levisohn and one maid. Hans Jørgen Jensen, a master tailor, resided in the building with his wife Henriette Andrea Jensen, their four sons (aged 12 to 20). Jens Peter Rasmussen, a klein smith, resided in the building with his wife Kathrine Anna Rasmussen and their five-year-old son. Niels Einar Jørgensen Ferslev, a pharmacist, resided in the building with his wife Minna Emilie Caroline Ferslev and one maid. Gydda van Deurs (née Lund, 1871–1939), who had recently divorced Charles Christian Wilson Van Deurs, resided in the building with her four sons (aged seven to 15). Petra Cathrine Foss, a widow book printer, resided in the building on her own. Peter Christian Jensen, a workman, resided in the building with his wife Ida Vilhelmin Jensen and their five children (aged three to 17). Christian August Sanderhoff, another workman, resided in the building with his wife Ane Kathrine Sanderhoff.

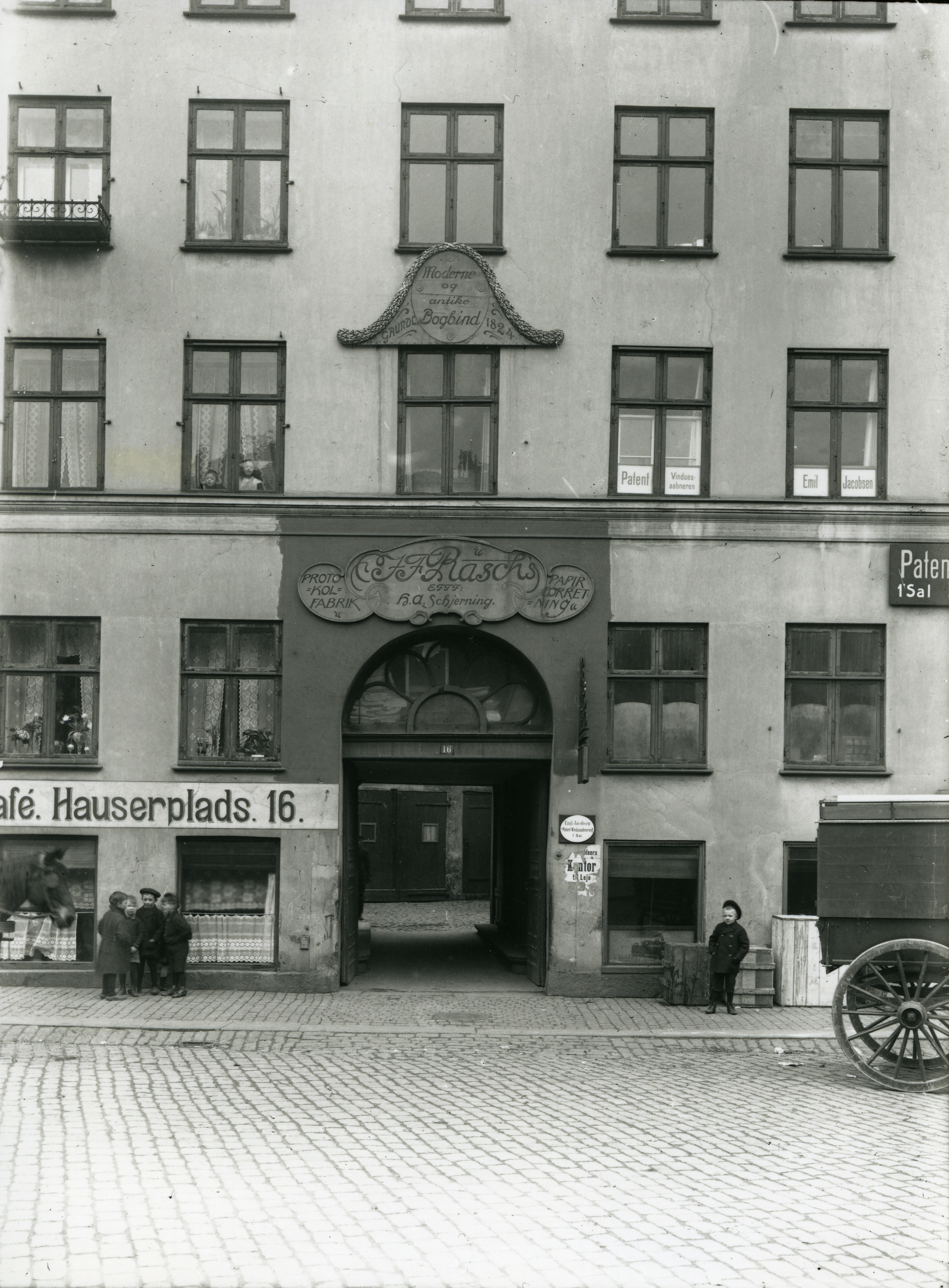
The building in 1916.

Frederiksen's haulier's business closed after his death in 1911. The restaurant was continued by Augusta Frederiksen in partnership with her four children. Three of the children died from the Spanish flu in the late 1910s. The surviving daughter Erna married Petrus Schønnemann, acook from nearbty Suhmsgade. The name of the restaurant was subsequently changed from Café Hauser Plads to Restaurant Schønnemann.

C. J. F. Rasch's Eftf., an almost 100 years old book binding business, now specializing in binding of protocols, relocated to the building in the 1910s. The firm was founded by Christian Johan Rasch back in 1924. It was from 1855 continued by his son Julius Ferdinand Rasch (f1825-1906) and his death by the son's widow Flemine Cecilie Rasch (née Lange). In 1910, it was still located at Gråbrødretorv 5. In 1914, it was taken over by H. A. Schjerning (1882-1949), a long-term employee, who was probably the one who moved the firm to Hauser Plads. He also expanded the operations with a stationery. The firm existed until at least 1950 and was then based at Forhåbningsholms Alle 2–4.

== Architecture ==
Hauser Plads 16 dominates the eastern side of Hauser Plads with its 11 bays wide facade. The building is constructed in brick with four storeys over a walk-out basement. The plastered facade is finished with a belt course above the ground floor and a modillioned cornice. The central gateway provides access to a large courtyard shared with the rest of the block. The two basement entrances, one on each side of the gate, are both topped by hood moulds. Access to the main staircase of the building is through a door in one side of the gateway. The pitched red tile roof features four dormer windows towards the square.

== Today ==
The building contains a restaurant and a shop in the basement and residential apartments on the upper floors. With a history that dates back to 1877, Restaurant Schønnemann is one of the oldest restaunts in Copenhagen. It specialises in smørrebrød.

== Gallery ==
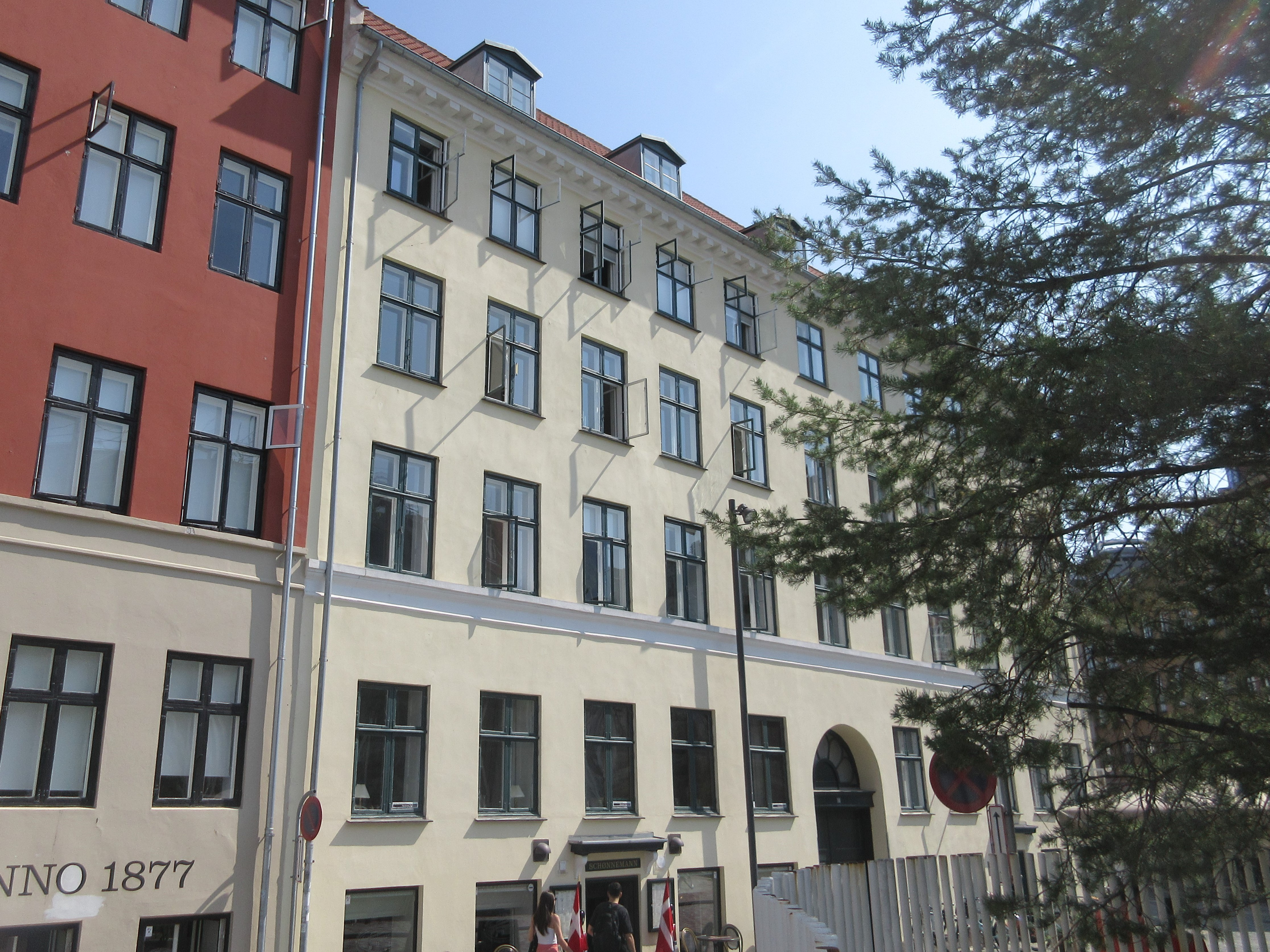

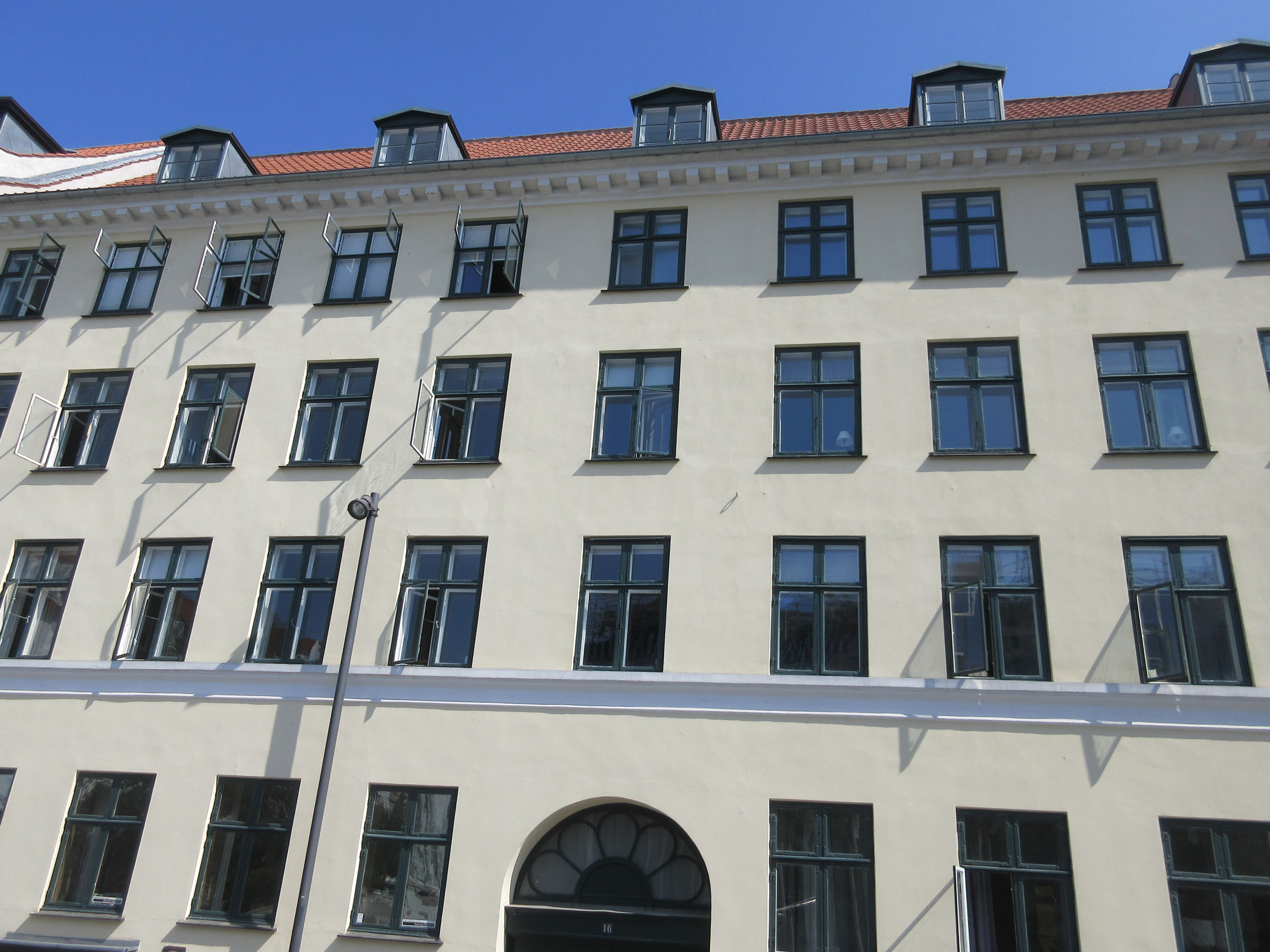

== See also ==
- Hauser Plads 12
- Hauser Plads 14
