= Hauser Plads 14 =

Building in Copenhagen, Denmark

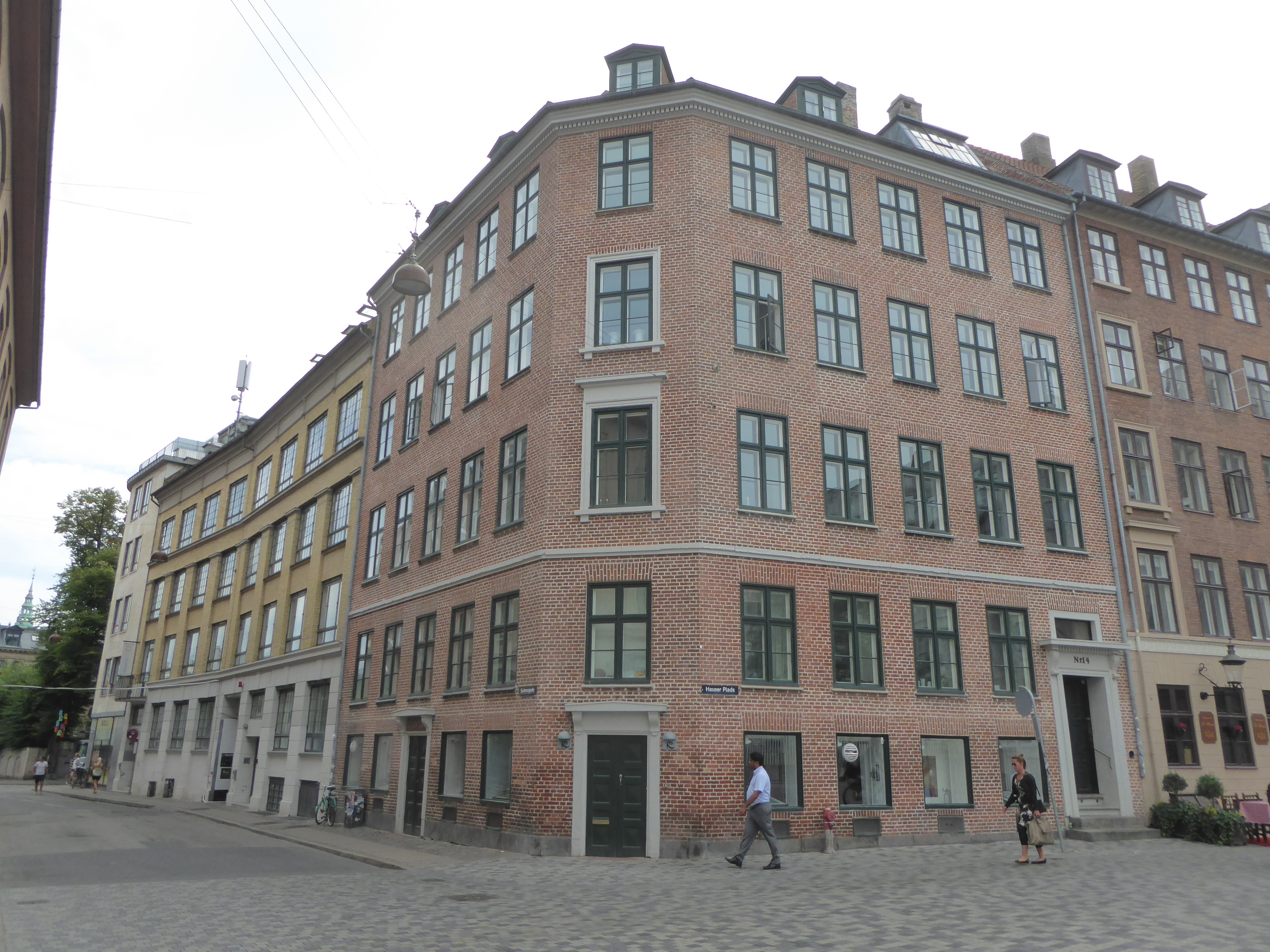
- Interactive map of the Hauser Plads 14 area

General information
- Location: Copenhagen, Denmark
- Coordinates: 55°40′56.82″N 12°34′33.42″E
- Completed: 1836

Hauser Plads 14 is a Neoclassical property situated at the corner of Hauser Plads and Suhmsgade in the Old Town of Copenhagen, Denmark. It was listed in the Danish registry of protected buildings and places in 1945. A large studio window in the roof bears testament to the fact that the painter Julius Exner lived and worked in the building from 1874 until 1888.

== History ==
=== Before the British bombardment of 1807 ===
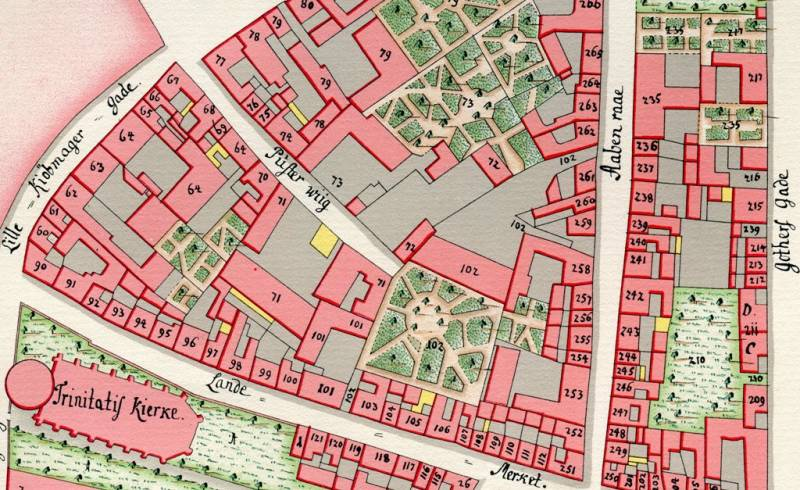
No. 71 seen on a detail from Gedde's map of Rosenborg Quarter, 1757.

The site was in the middle of the 18th century part of a larger property. It was listed as No. 71 in Rosenborg Quarter in the new cadastre of 1756 and was at that time owned by one justitsråd Dreyer. The street Pustervig was at this point still a cul-de-sac.

The property was after the Copenhagen Fire of 1795 divided into two properties. They were listed as No. 196 and No. 197 in the new cadastre of 1806. No. 197 was at that time owned by H. J. Olivarius. No. 196 was owned by tanner Peter Ahlgreen.

=== Mads Schifter Holm and the new building ===
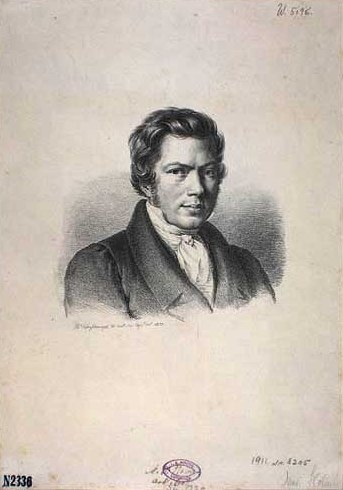
Mads Schifter Holm.

The two properties were again destroyed in the British bombardment of the city in 1807. The area was used for the handling and storage of timber for many years in connection with the rebuilding of the city after the bombardment. The creation of a public square at the site was first proposed by Conrad Hauser in 1819. The site was, with the creation of the new street Suhmsgade the same year, converted into a corner property but it would take another ten years before the plans for the new square were realized. No. 196 was in 1821 divided into No. 196 and No. 106 A. The eastern part of No. 196 A was as No. 196 C merged with No. 197 in 1830. No. 197 was acquired by the master builder Mads Schifter Holm in c. 1834. He had just completed his first independent building at Nørregade 18. He constructed the building at the corner of Hauser Plads and Suhmsgade in 1835–1836.

=== Later history ===
At the time of the 1840 census, No. 197 was home to 33 residents in five households. Hans Dalberg (1798–1860), a customs officer, resided on the ground floor with his wife Emilie Dalberg, their six children (aged two to 12) and two maids. Johannes Ephraim Larsen (1799–1856), professor of law at the University of Copenhagen, resided on the first floor with his wife Caroline Hvem, their two-year-old son Knud Sophus J. Larsen, the 67-year-old widow Marie Hvem and one maid. Mary Anne Ogilvie, widow of J. Olivierus, resided on the second floor with her daughter Mary Alian Ogilvie, five lodgers and two maids. Henrik Sternbach, a naval officer with the rank of first lieutenant, resided on the second floor with his wife Elisabeth Wilhelmine Albertine Steenbach, their one-year-old son Henrik Charles Stirnbach and two maids. Waldemar Schiødt, a grocer (urtekræmmer), resided in the basement with his wife Signe Schiødt, a 16-year-old apprentice and a maid.

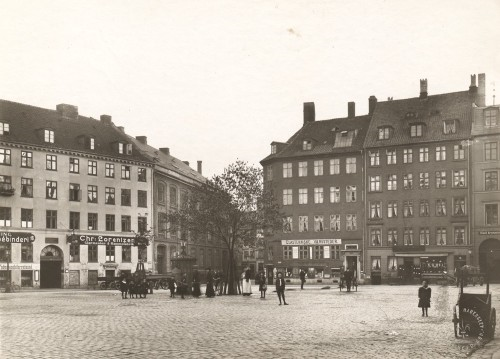
The building seen to the right on a photo from the 1900s.

Hans Dahlerup (1790–1872), a naval officer with the rank of commander captain, was among the residents of the building in 1841–1842. Harakd Kayser (1817–1895), later a master carpenter and politician, was among the residents in around 1844.

Painter Julius Exner (1825–1910) resided in one of the apartments from 1874 to 1888. He was appointed professor at the Royal Danish Academy of Fine Arts in 1876. His studio was most likely located in the garret.

== Architecture ==
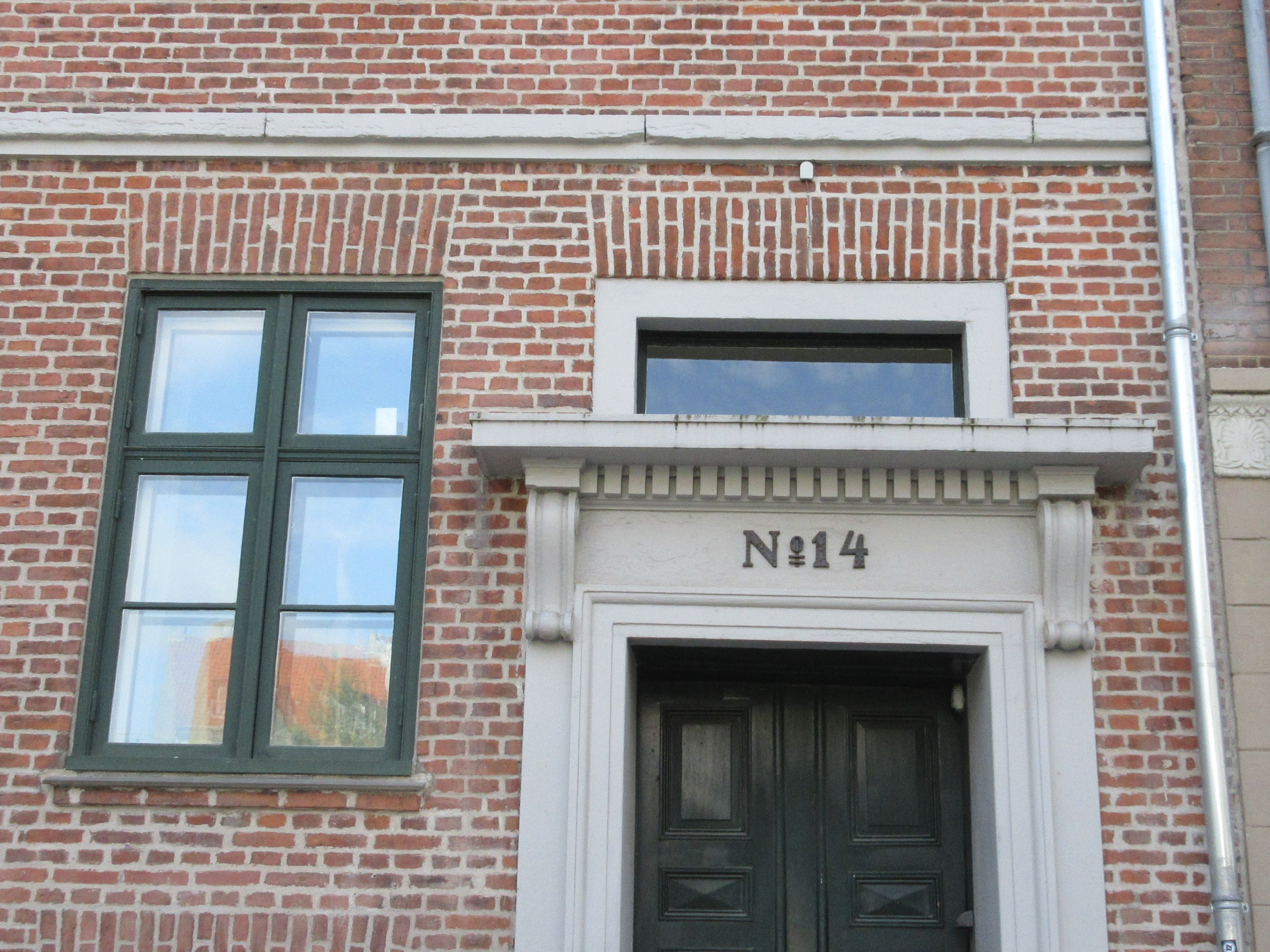
Detail of the hood mould above the main entrance.

Hauser Plads 14 is constructed with four storeys over a walk-out basement. It is built of dark red brick on a granite plinth with five bays towards Hauser Plads, five bays towards Suhmsgade and a chamfered corner. The latter was dictated for all corner buildings by Jørgen Henrich Rawert's and Peter Meyn's guidelines for the rebuilding of the city after the Great Fire of 1795 so that the fire department's long ladder companies could navigate the streets more easily. The facade is finished with a sandstone band between the first and second floor and a dentillated cornice. The main entrance and the two basement entrances as well as the corner windows on the second and third floors are also accented with sandstone framing. The main entrance is topped by a dentillated hood mould supported by corbels. The two basement entrances are topped by triangular pediments. The pitched roof features four dormer windows and an atelier window towards the street. It is pierced by four chimneys.

== Today ==
Hauser Plads 14 is owned by E/F Hauser Plads 14 (founded 15 July 2010). It contains a hair salon and barber in the basement and a single condominium on each of the upper floors.
