= Hauser Plads 12 =

Listed building in Copenhagen

- Hauser Plads 12
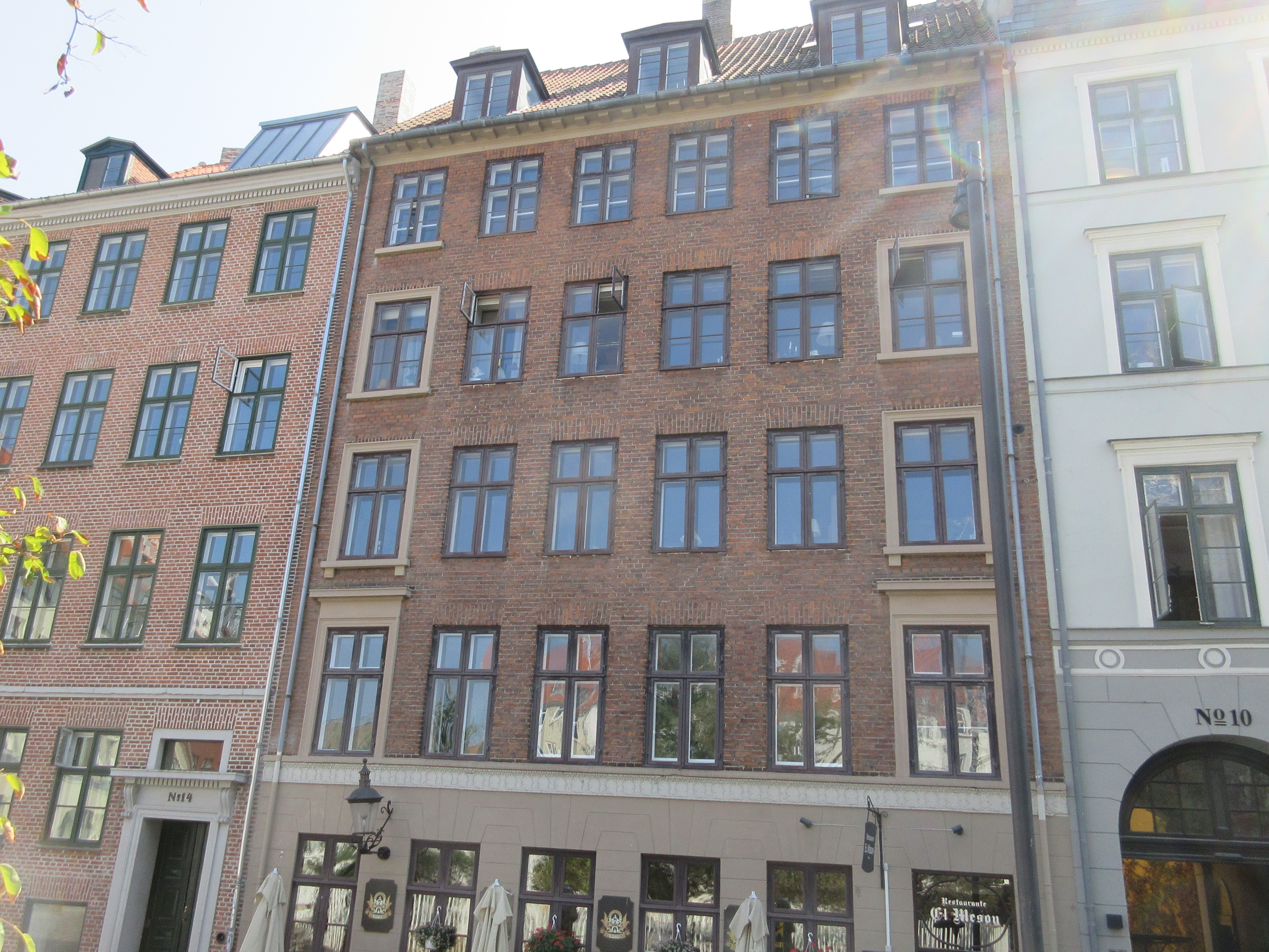
- Interactive map of the Hauser Plads 12 area

General information
- Location: Copenhagen, Denmark
- Coordinates: 55°40′56.68″N 12°34′32.81″E
- Completed: 1837

Hauser Plads 12 is a Neoclassical property situated on the south side of Hauser Plads in the Old Town of Copenhagen, Denmark. It was listed in the Danish registry of protected buildings and places in 1945. Notable former residents include the actor Jørgen Christian Hansen and the film director Carl Theodor Dreyer.

== History ==
=== Before the British bombardment of 1807 ===
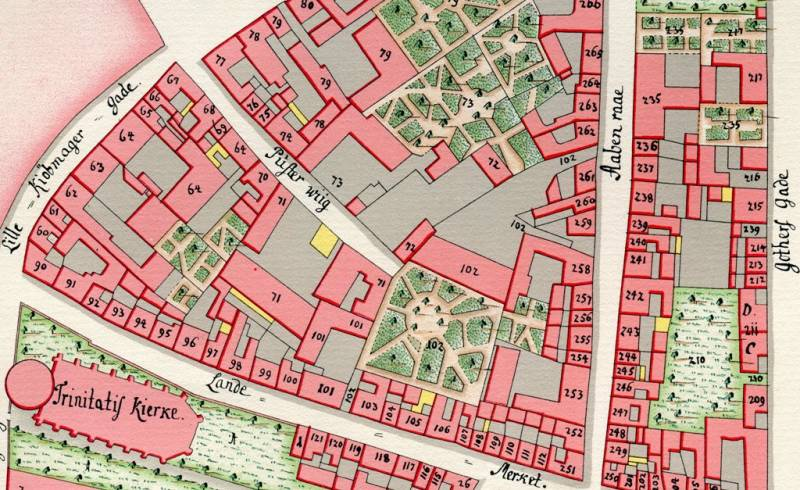
No. 71 seen on a detail from Gedde's map of Rosenborg Quarter, 1757.

The site was in the middle of the 18th century part of a larger property. It was listed as No. 71 in Rosenborg Quarter in the new cadastre of 1756 and was at that time owned by one justitsråd Dreyer. The street Pustervig was at this point still a cul-de-sac.

The property was after the Copenhagen Fire of 1795 divided into two properties. They were listed as No. 196 and No. 197 in the new cadastre of 1806. No. 197 was at that time owned by H. J. Olivarius. No. 196 was owned by tanner Peter Ahlgreen.

=== C. O. Frydensberg and the new building ===
The two properties were again destroyed in the British bombardment of the city in 1807. The area was used for the handling and storage of timber for many years in connection with the rebuilding of the city after the bombardment. The creation of a public square at the site was first proposed by Conrad Hauser in 1819. No. 196 was around the same time divided into No. 196 A and No. 196. In 1830 the eastern part of No. 196A was merged with No. 197 as No. 196C & 197. In 1835, No. 196C and No. 197 was again divided into two separate properties. No. 106C was at this point owned by silk and textile merchant J. H. Holm. In 1836, he started the construction of a new building on the site. It was, however, prior to its completion in 1837, sold to Christian Offer Frydensberg (1797-1861).

Christian Offer Frydensberg worked as a senior clerk (fuldmægtig) for Copenhagen County at the time of the 1840 census. His property was then home to 32 residents in five households. Christian Offer Frydensberg resided on the third floor with his wife Gudrun (née Petersen), their two children (aged one and five), two lodgers, a maid and a wet nurse. Jørgen Christian Hansen, an actor at the Royal Danish Theatre, resided on the second floor with his wife Adolphine Erhardine Hansen, their one-year-old sonCarl Christian Hansen, a still unnamed infant daughter, a housekeeper (husjomfru), a maid and a wet nurse. Jens Hansen Lund, a silk and textile merchant, resided on the first floor with one maid. Jens Nielsen Larsen, a sculptor, resided on the ground floor with his wife Louise Augusta Holtem their six children (aged one to 11) and one maid. Frederikke Conradine Elise Bruun, who ran a scuool (probably in her home), resided on the fourth floor with the teacher Julie Worishøffer. Johan Christian Steinhäuser, a building painter, resided in the garret with his wife Sophie Amalie Steinhäuser and their two children (aged one and four).

The property was again home to 32 residents at the 1845 census. Christian Offer Frydensberg, wjo now worked as a bookkeeper for the University of Copenhagen, resided on the second floor with his wife, three children (aged one to 10) and two maids. Jens Nielsen Larsen was still resident on the ground floor with his wife, their now six children (aged two to 16) and one maid. Jens Hansen Rundt, a silk and textile merchant, resided on the first floor with one servant. Erik Norden Sølling (1802–1879, son of Peter Norden Sølling), a bookkeeper in the State Debt Directorate, resided on the third floor with his wife Mathilde Erasmine Henriette Sølling (née Ammitzbølle), their four children (aged one to five), 18-year-old Ernst Schmidt and two maids. Søren Møller, a secretary and bookkeeper for Sjellands Stifts Brandassuranceforening, resided on the fourth floor with his wife Hansine Vilhelmine Møller (née Trojel), their three-year-old daughter and two maids.

=== Later history ===
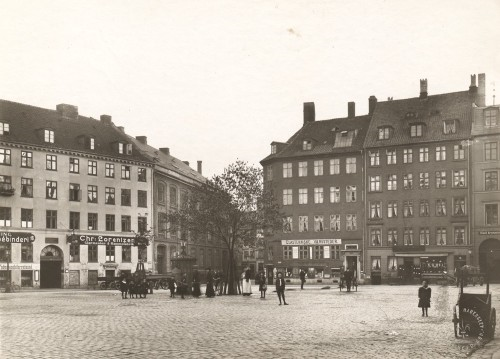
The building seen to the right on a photo from the 1900s.

The property was home to 23 residents at the 1906 census. Lars Peter Andersen, owner of the clothing retailer on the ground floor, resided in the associated dwelling with his wife Karen Andersen and their and their 33-year-old daughter Anna Petra Andersen. Rikke Benjamin, a 95-year-old widow, resided on the first floor with two unmarried daughters (aged 61 and 63) and two lodgers. James F. Grøn, a businessman (grosserer), resided on the second floor with his wife Louise Grøn, his mother-in-law Louise Hamburger and one maid. Moritz Melchior (1854-1935, great-grandson of Moses Marcus Melchior), another businessman, resided alone on the third floor. Jens Jacob Christensen, a manager (forvalter), resided on the fourth floor with his wife Emma Elisabeth Henriette Christensen, their three children (aged eight to 16) and his mother-in-law Simon Christen Christensen. Flora Valborg Chatrine Mortensen, a 48-year-old woman, married but with no mention of her husband, resided aæpne on the fifth floor (garret). Jørgen Mortensen, a cook, resided alone on the fifth floor.

On 1 November 1910, Carl Theodor Dreyer moved from a second floor apartment at Fredericiagade 27 to the fourth floor apartment at Hauser Plads 12. On 1 May 1011, he moved to an apartment on the third floor at Dronningens Tværgade 16.

== Architecture ==
The building is constructed in dark red brick with five storeys over a walk-out basement. The siv-bays wide facade features a palmette frize below the first floor windows and a modillioned cornice. The plastered, lower part of the facade is finished with shadow joints. The outer windows on the first, second and third floor are accented with plastered framing. The outer windows on the fourth floor are accented with projecting sills but no extra framing. The pitched red tile roof features three dormer windows towards the street. The roof ridge is pierced by two chimeneys. A side wing projects from the rear side of the building along one side of a courtyard. The side wing is not part of the heritage listing.

== Today ==
The property is today owned by E/ Hauser Plads 12. El Meson, a tapas restaurant, has occupied the ground floor since 1976. A single condominium is located on each of the upper floors.

== Gallery ==
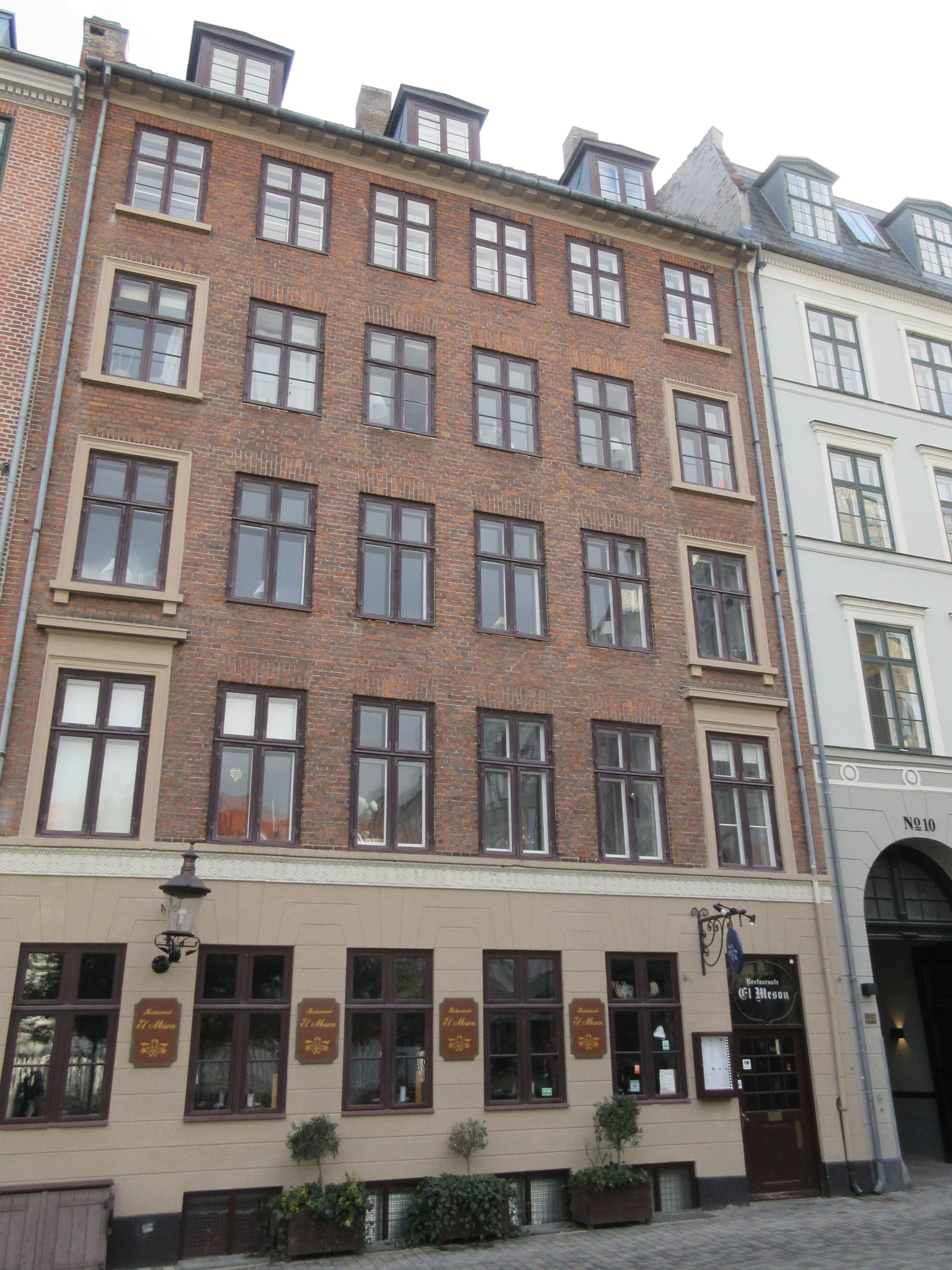
The building viewed from the square.

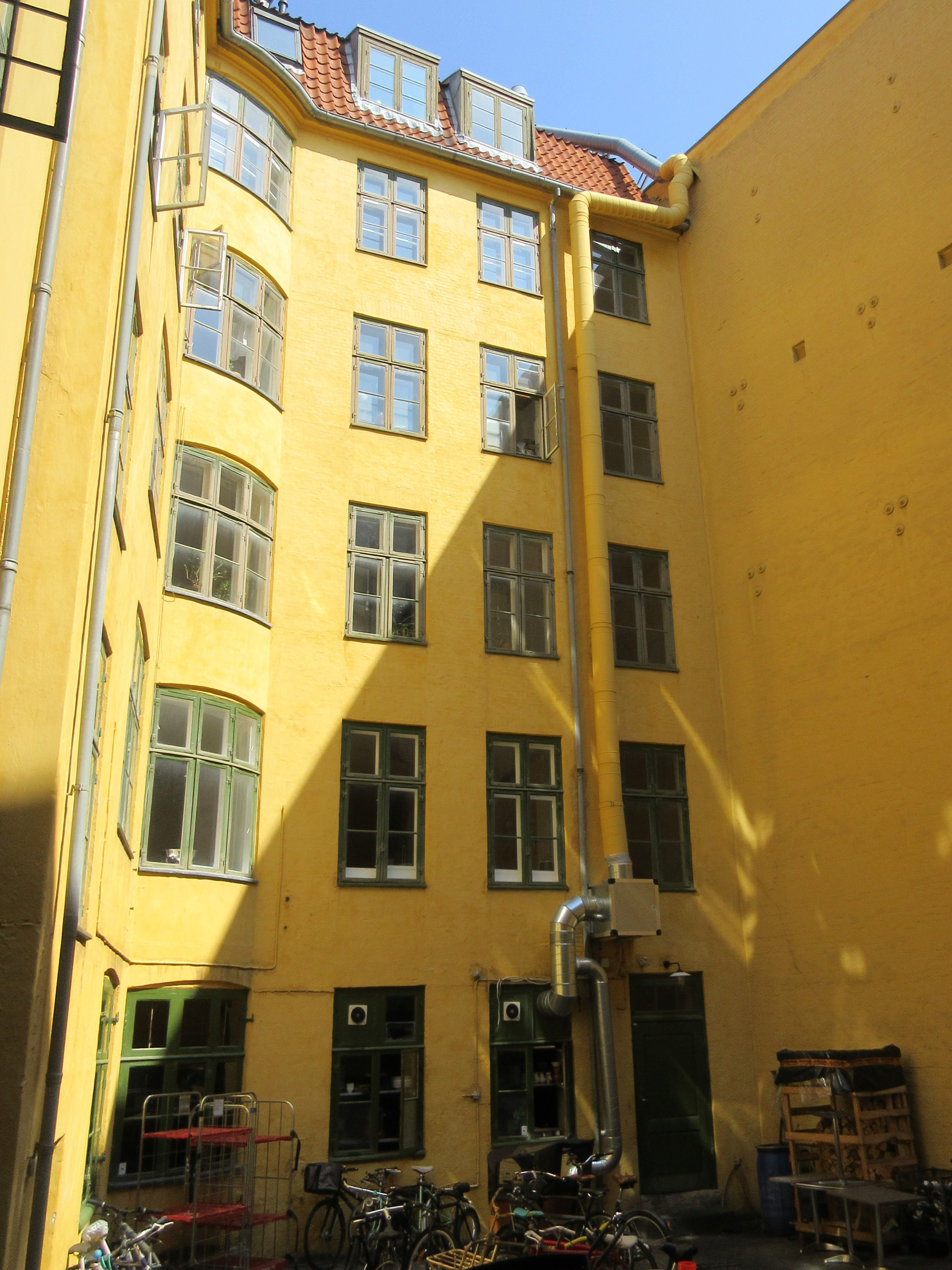
The side wing viewed from the courtyard.

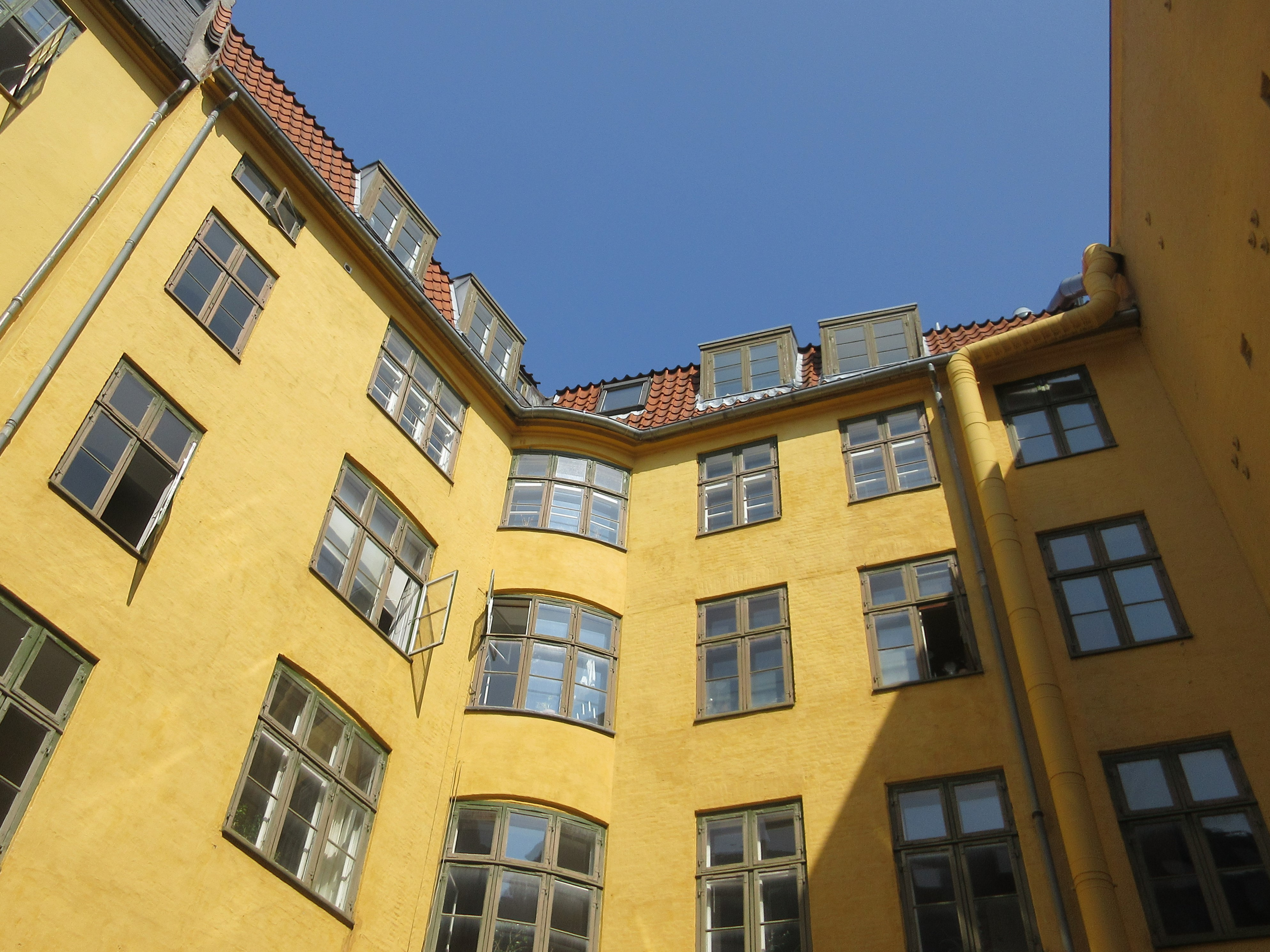
The building viewed from the courtyard.
