= Hauser Plads 24 =

Listed building in Copenhagen

- Hauser Plads 24
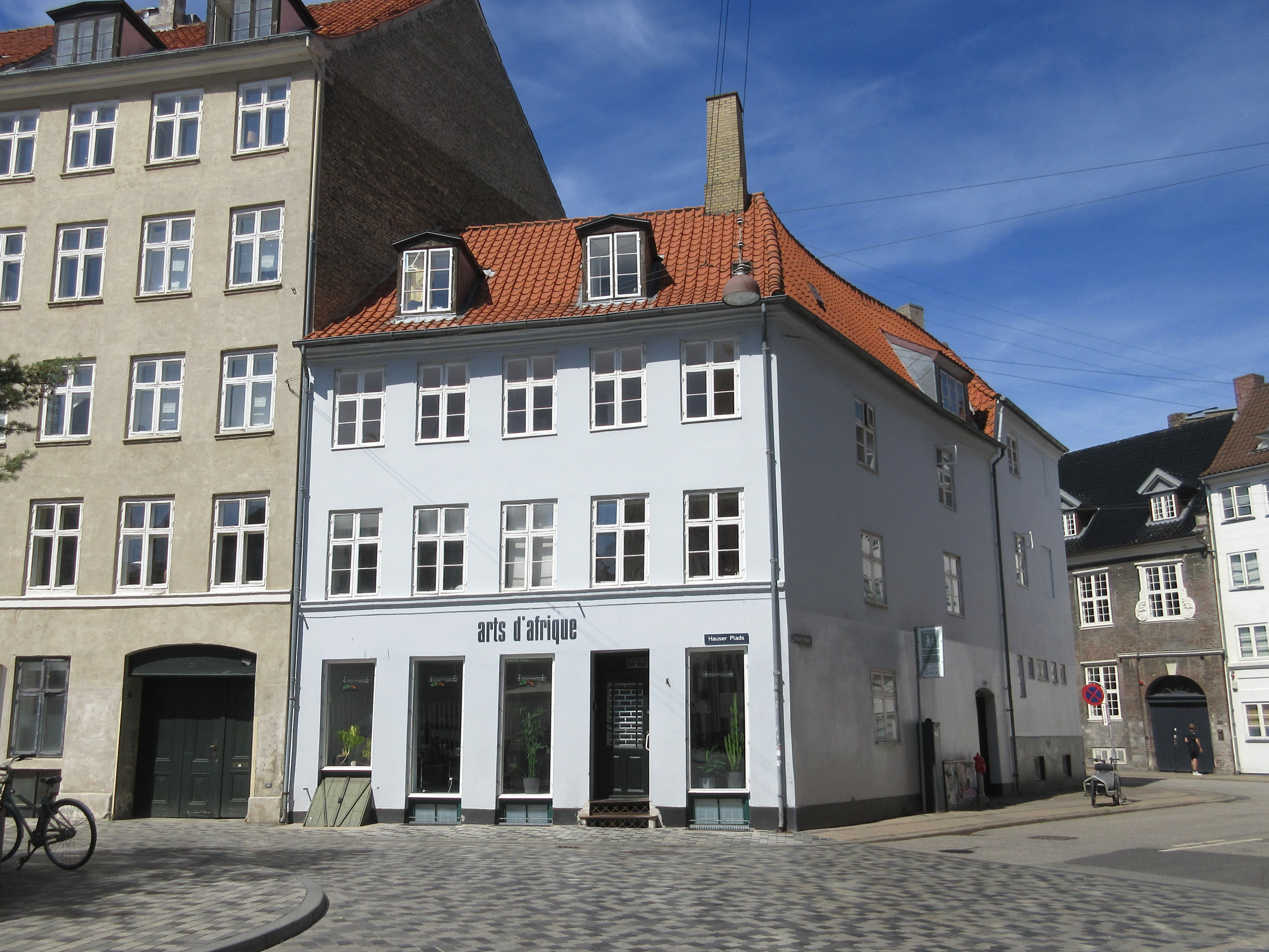
- Interactive map of the Hauser Plads 24 area

General information
- Location: Copenhagen, Denmark
- Coordinates: 55°40′59.3″N 12°34′32.95″E
- Completed: 1733
- Renovated: 1830s, 1839m 1883

Hauser Plads 24/Pbenrå 23 is an 18th-century building complex occupying an irregular corner site between the square Hauser Plads and the street Åbenrå, north of a short unnamed street section linking the square with the street, in the Old Town of Copenhagen, Denmark. It is the only building on the square that dates from the time before the British bombardment in 1807 and the subsequent creation of the square. It was listed in the Danish registry of protected buildings and places in 1945. Niels Frommelt operated an underground printing workshop in the building (Hauser Plads 24) during the German occupation of Denmark in World War II.

== History ==
=== Early history ===
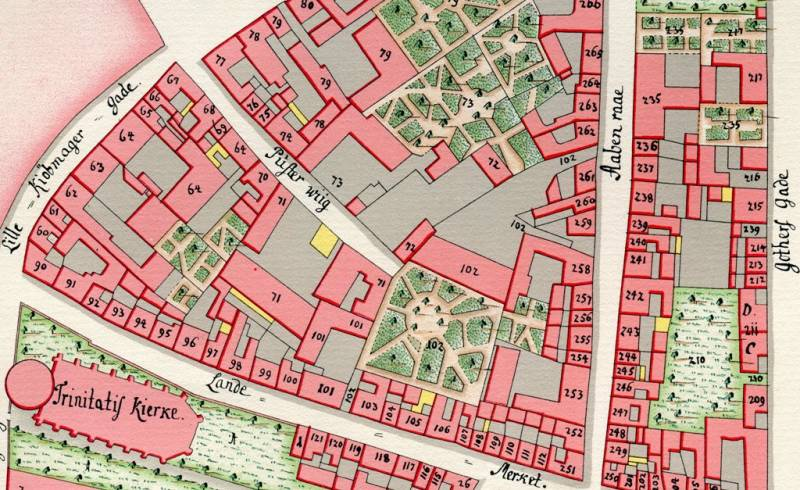
No. 262 seen in a detail from Gedde's map of Rosenborg Quarter, 1757

The property was formerly part of a vast property covering most of what is now Hauser Plads, from Pustervig in the south to Åbenrå in the northeast and Sankt Gertruds Stræde in the west. This property was listed in Copenhagen's first cadastre of 1689 as No. 85 in Rosenborg Quarter and was owned by secretary Johan Seckmann at that time. He was the maternal grandfather of naval officer Johan Seckman Fleischer.

Seckmann's former property was after the Copenhagen Fire of 1728 divided into a number of smaller properties, later listed in the city's new cadastre of 1756 as No. 71–80 and No. 262–267. The property now known as Åbenrå 23/Hauser Plads 24 was listed as No. 262 and belonged to klein smith Claus Gertsen at that time. The present building complex on the site was constructed in 1733. It consisted of a two-storey main wing fronting Aabenraa, a short side wing and a two-storey, half-timbered rear wing facing the garden of No. 79 (now part of Hauser Plads). No. 79 belonged to one kancelliråd Brandt's widow. No. 262 was to the east separated from No. 261 by a narrow driveway which afforded access to the courtyard of No. 102 (owned by Just Fabritius, who also owned No. 72), corresponding to the unnamed street section that now links Hauser Plads with Åbenrå.

=== After the British bombardment of 1807 ===
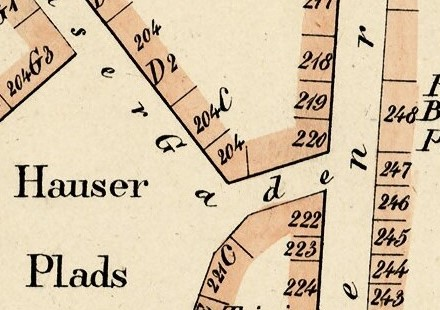
No. 220/204B seen in a detail from a cadestral map of Rosenborg Quarter, 1841

The old No. 262 was listed in the new cadastre of 1806 as No. 220. It was owned by a military officer with rank of colonel lieutenant named von Harboe (or possibly Harbou) at that time. The old No. 79 was listed as No. 204.

No. 220 was one of few buildings in the area that survived the British bombardment of the city in 1807. The property was after the fire expanded with a small section of the garden of No. 204 (No. 204D). The rear wing was subsequently made a little deeper and its facade was in this connection reconstructed in brick.

The property's old rear wing obtained a much more visible location with the creation of Hauser Plads in the 1830s. It was most likely in conjunction with this initiative that the building was heightened. Its ground floor was at the same time adapted for use a retail space.

=== 1840 census ===
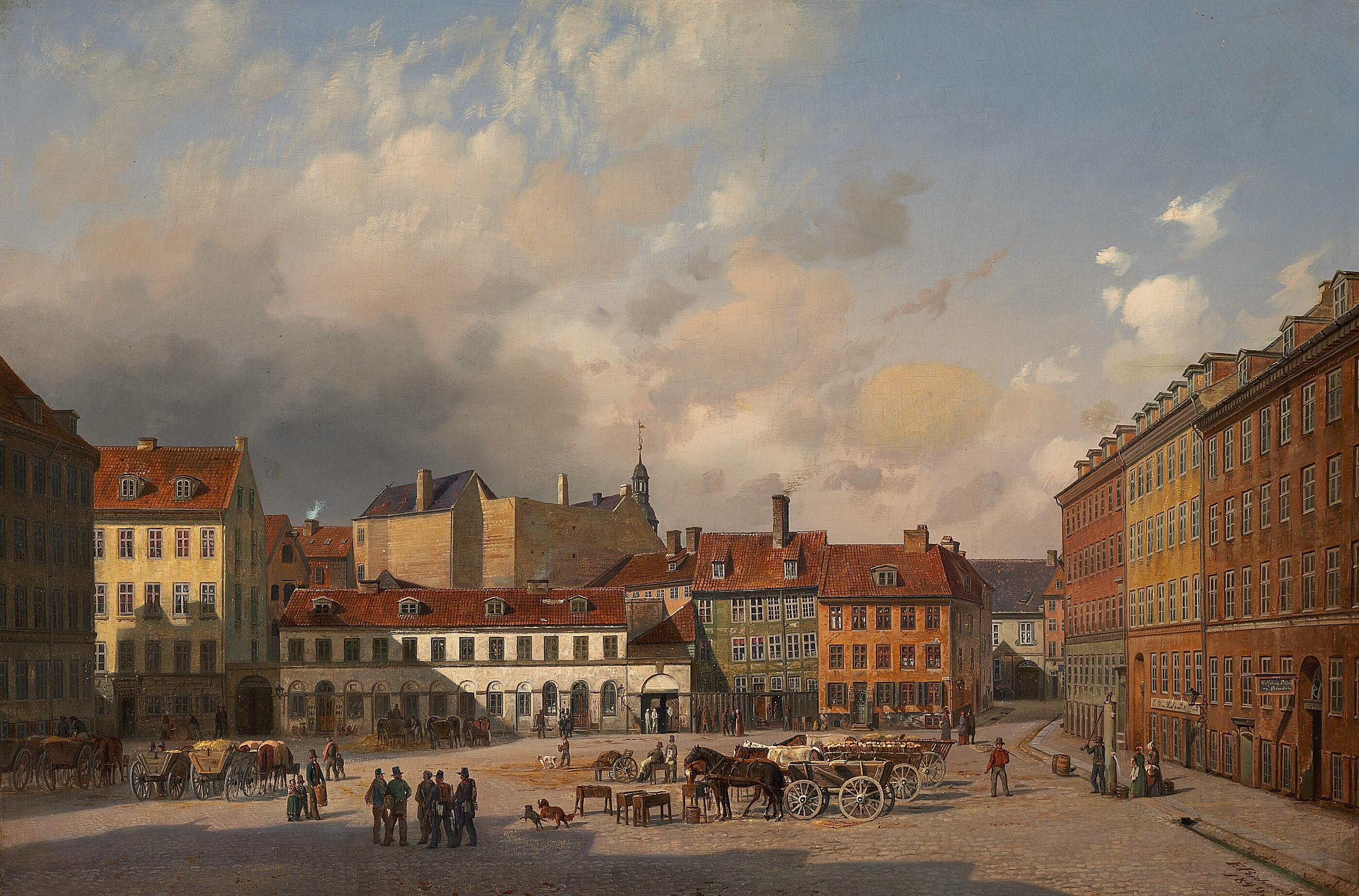
Ferdinand Richardt: Hauser Plads, 1849: Hauser Plad 24 is the house furthest to the right in the central house row.

The property was home to a total of 40 residents in seven households at the time of the 1840 census. Isak Polan, a Jewish manufacturer of barometers, resided on the ground floor towards Aabenraa with his wife Mariane Mose, their six children (aged three to 17), one maid and three lodgers (two weavers and a book printer). Jens Olsen, a watchman, resided on the first floor towards Aabenraa with his wife Ingeborg Olsen, their two-year-old son and two lodgers (porcelain manufacturers). Peder Schmidt, a cotton weaver, resided on the second floor towards Aabenraa with his wife Sophie Schietzing, their four children (aged one to nine), his mother Caroline Bentzen and one maid. Niels Olsen, a carpenter, resided in the basement towards Aabenraa with his wife Mariane Høyer, their two children (aged two and five) and one maid. Cathrine Bjerring, a flour retailer and ryebread baker, resided on the ground floor towards Hauser Plads with two daughters (aged 18 and 27), one maid and one lodger. Secilie Kruse, a 60-year-old widow, resided on the first floor towards Hauser plads with the lodger August von Kettsck (retired officer). Baltoline Krennel, another widow, resided on the second floor towards Hauser Plads with her 24-year-old daughter and one maid.

=== 1845 census ===
The property was home to 21 residents in 1845. Niels Jensen, a master weaver, resided on the ground floor with his wife Concordia Otilia [Jensen], their three children (aged three to nine), two apprentices (aged 18 to 19) and one maid. Marie Elisabeth Storchter, a 52-year-old widow needleworker, resided on the second floor with her 19-year-old daughter Laura Christiane Storchter (tailoring). Andreas Ibsen resided in the basement with his wife Maren Ibsen, their 15-year-old daughter, a cooper (employee) and a workman.

=== Later history ===
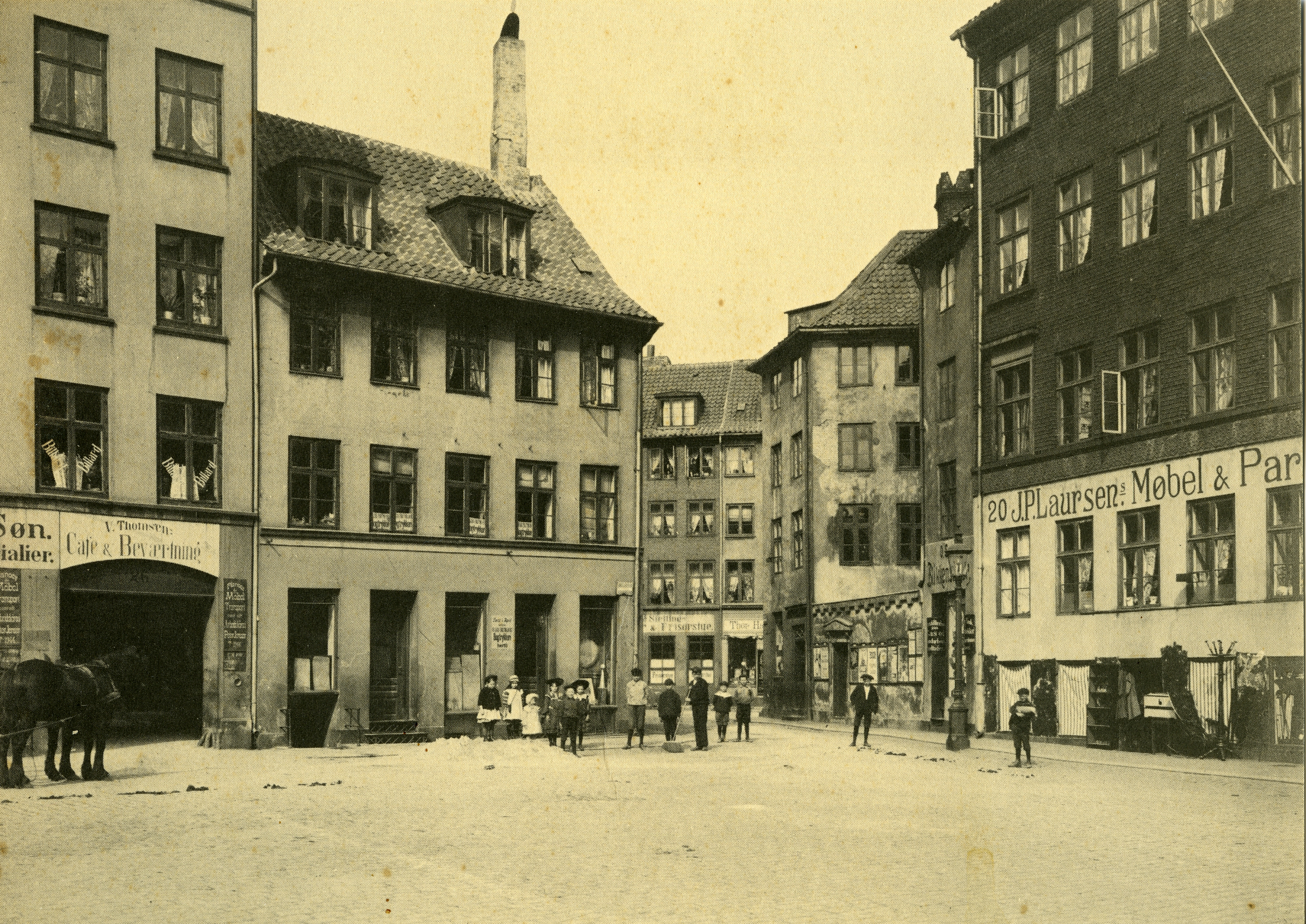
The building in 1905

Lauritz Rasmussen's bronze and zinc foundry was founded in the building in 1853. It relocated to larger premises in Sankt Annæ Gade (No. 36) in 1856.

The ground floor of Hauser Plads 24 was for a while home to a combined tobacco, wine and fruit shop.

The resistance group Studenternes Efterretningstjeneste operated an underground printing business in the building during the German occupation of Denmark in World War II. The operation was headed by Niels Frommelt. He was arrested by the Gestapo in Mikkel Bryggersgade on 27 September 1943.

== Architecture ==
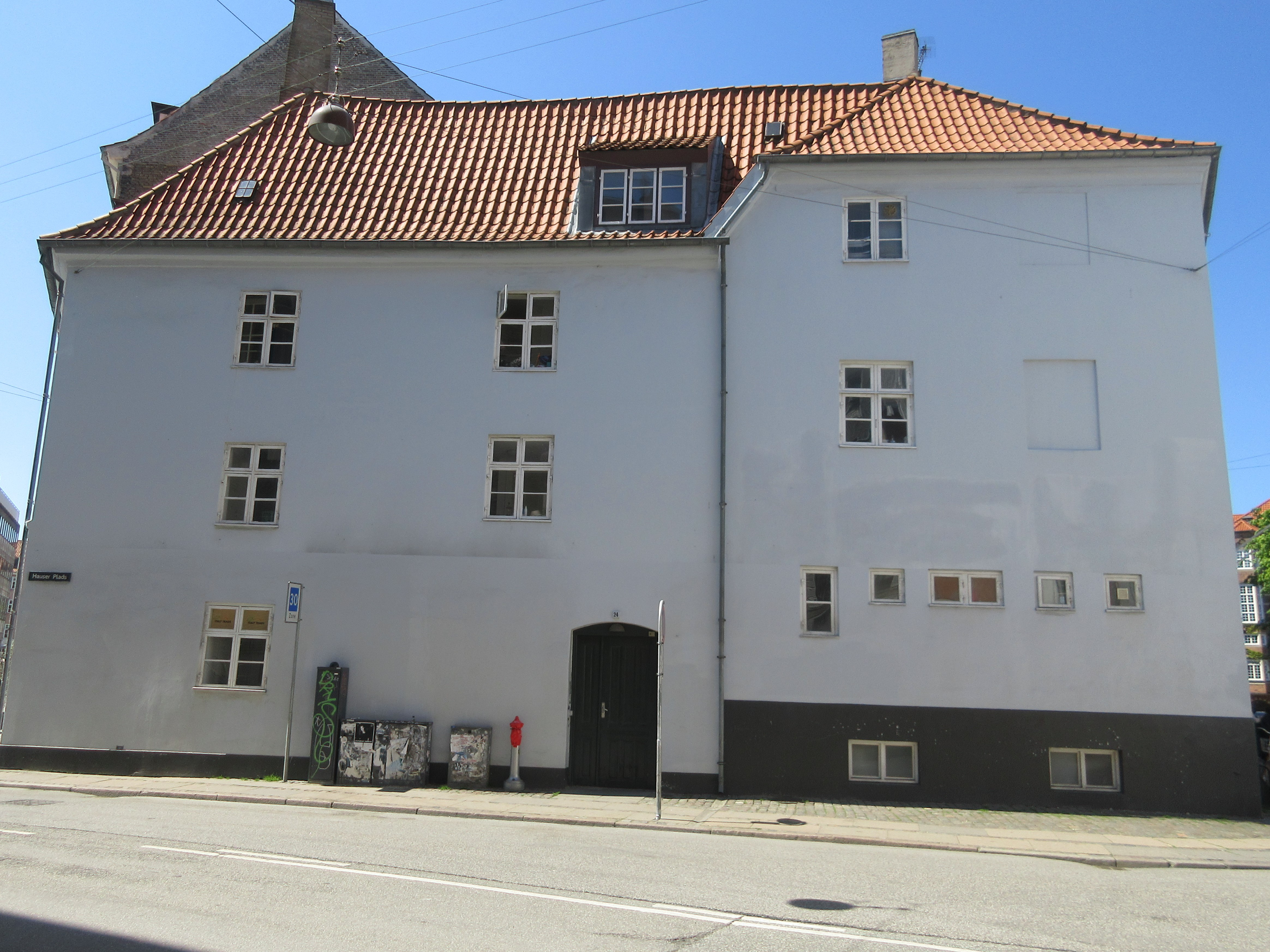
The complex seen from the unnamed street section between Hauser Plads (left) and Åbenrå (right)

The complex consists of two three-storey, obtuse-angled corner buildings, attached to each other by a narrow and just 3.25 m long side wing. The facade is plastered and white-painted towards the street except for the exposed basement level of Åbenrå 22, which is black-painted. The rear side of both buildings (towards the courtyard) are plastered and yellow-painted with green-painted windows towards the central courtyard/lightwell.

Hauser Plads was originally constructed as the half-timbered rear wing of the house in Åbenrå. It was made deeper and its facade was reconstructed in brick after the British bombardment in 1807. Both buildings were heightened in the late 1830s. Hauser Plads 24 was at some point heightened with one storey. Its red tile red tile roof is pierced by a tall brick chimney. In the late 1830s, Åbenrå 23 was also heightened, but only towards the street and without increasing the overall height of the building, leading to an unusually shallow roof pitch on this side of the complex. The side wing was originally constructed with timber framing. Its lower part was not reconstructed in brick until 1859, when it was also heightened to the same height as the main wing towards Hauser Plads. Its rear side was not reconstructed in brick until c. 1884. A door in the side wing affords access to the upper floors of Hauser Plads 24 as well as to the central courtyard.

== Today ==
The building is today owned by A/B Hauser Plads 24. Hauser Plads 24 contains a shop on the ground floor and in the basement and three three residential apartments on the upper floors. Åbenråå contains a shop in the basement and a single apartment on each of the upper floors.
