= Suhmsgade =

Street in Copenhagen, Denmark

Coordinates: 55.6828°N 12.5761°E

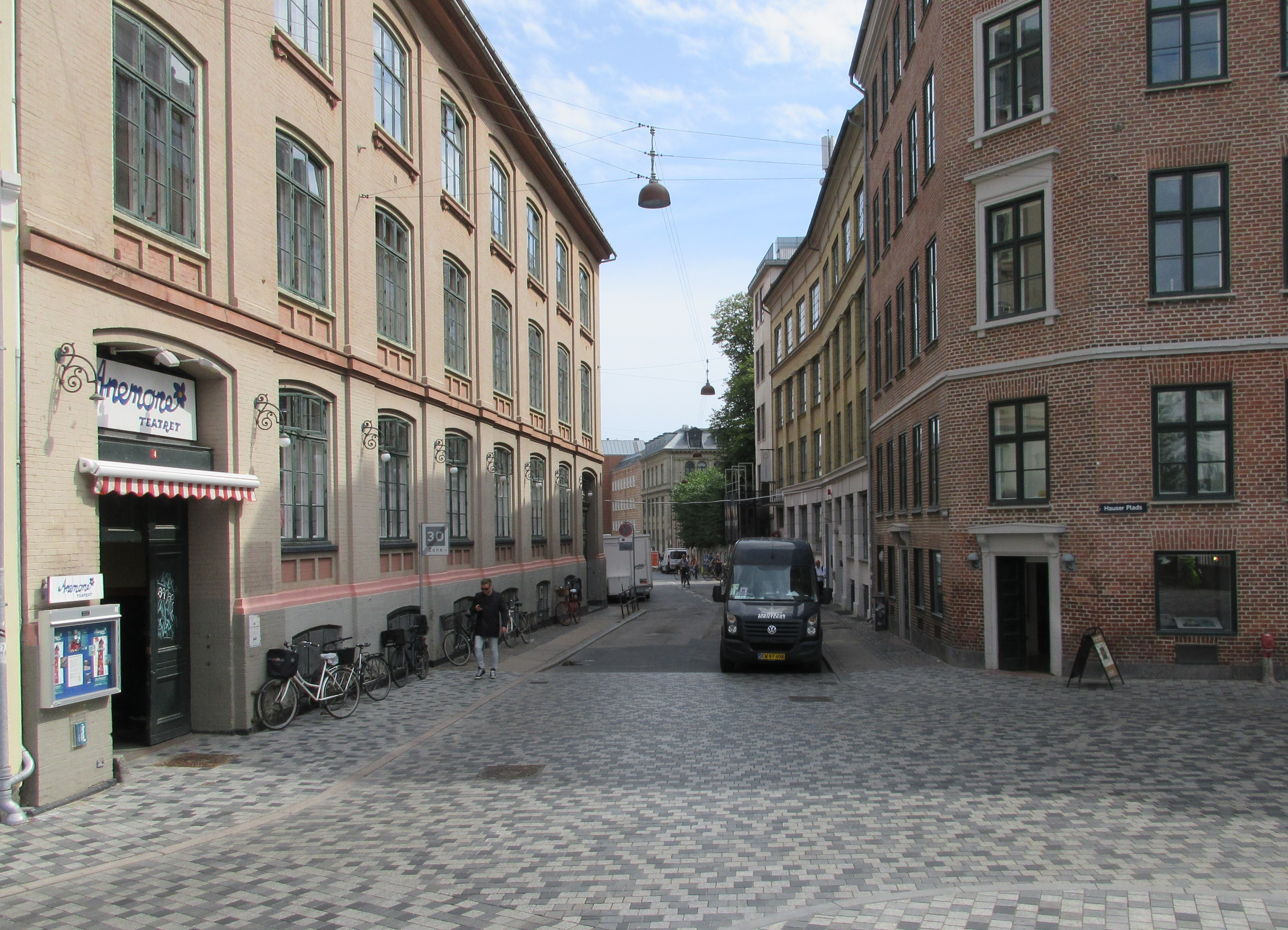
Krystalgade with Trinity Church on Købmagergade visible in the background

Suhmsgade is a street in the Old Town of Copenhagen, Denmark. It runs from Landemærket to Hauser Plads.

== History ==
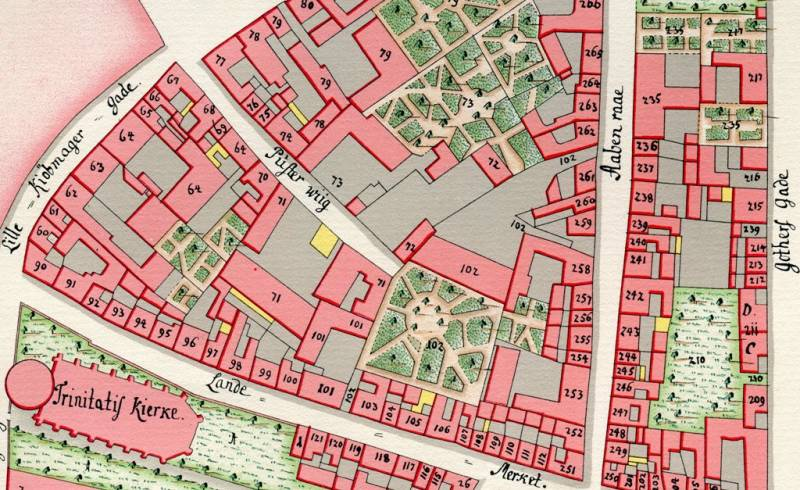
The area where Hauser Plads and Suhmsgade is located as seen on Gedde's district map from c1757

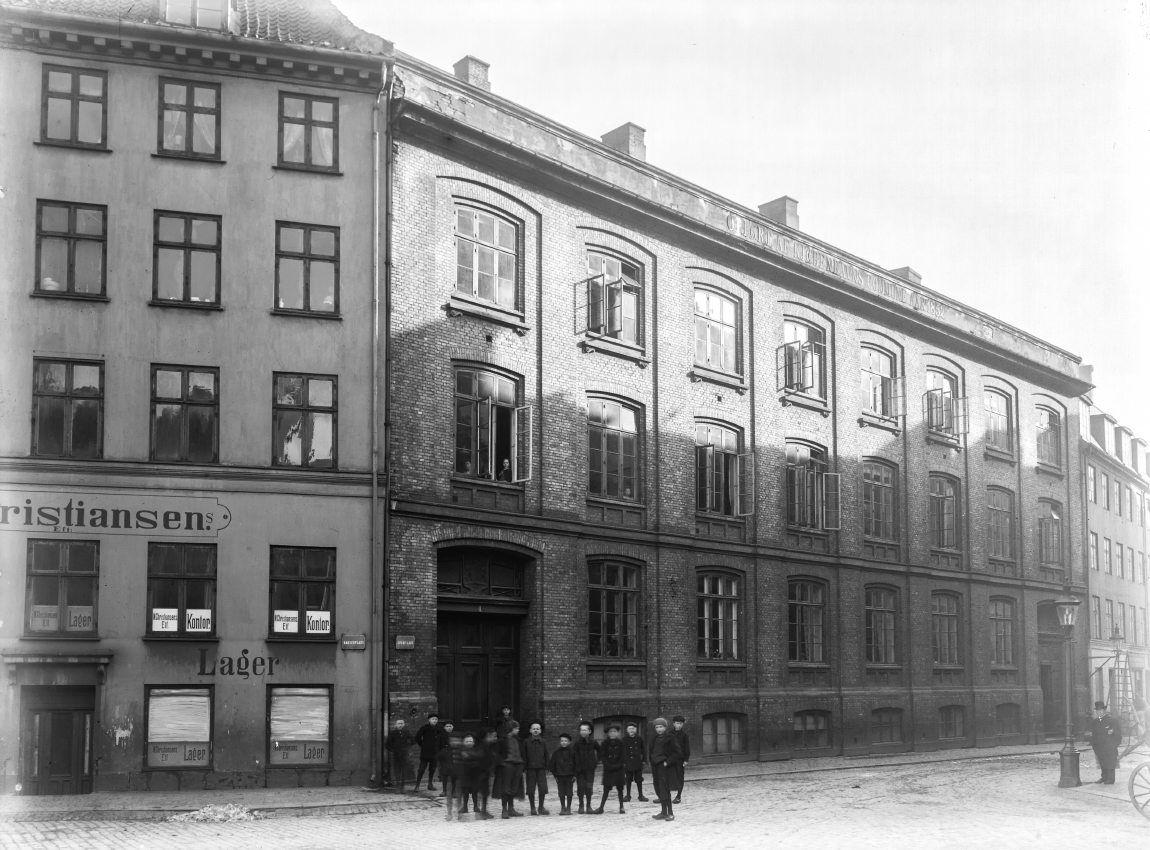
Suhmsgade photographed by Frederik Rii

The street is relatively young. The street Pustervig was originally a cul-de-sac off the east side of Købmagergade. Suhmsgade was created as a link between Landemærket and the new square Hauser Plads following the British bombardment of Copenhagen in 1807 which caused great destruction in the area. It was named after the writer and book collector Peter Frederik Suhm who had lived in a house nearby.

== Notable buildings and residents ==
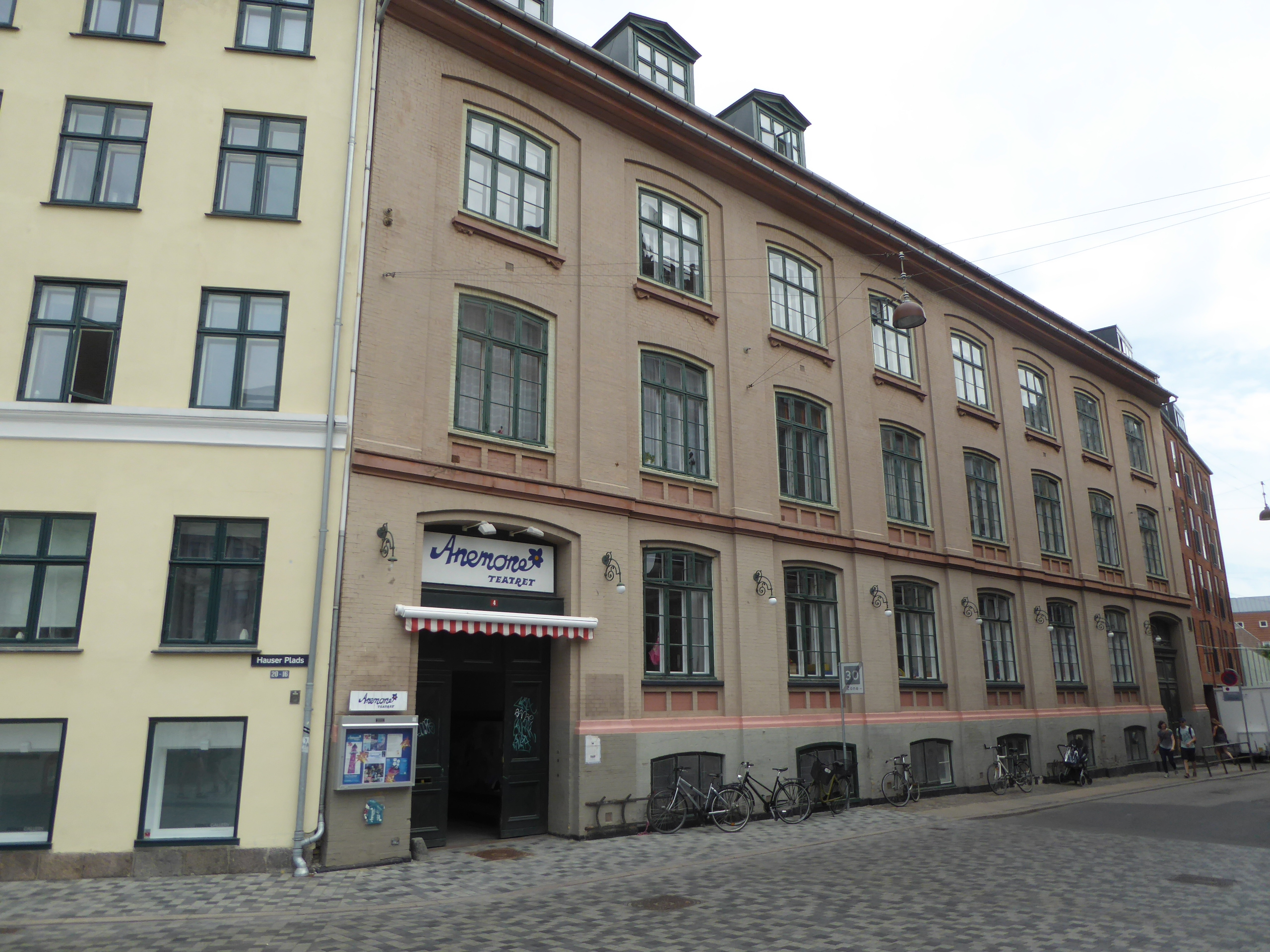
No. 4: Annemone Teatret

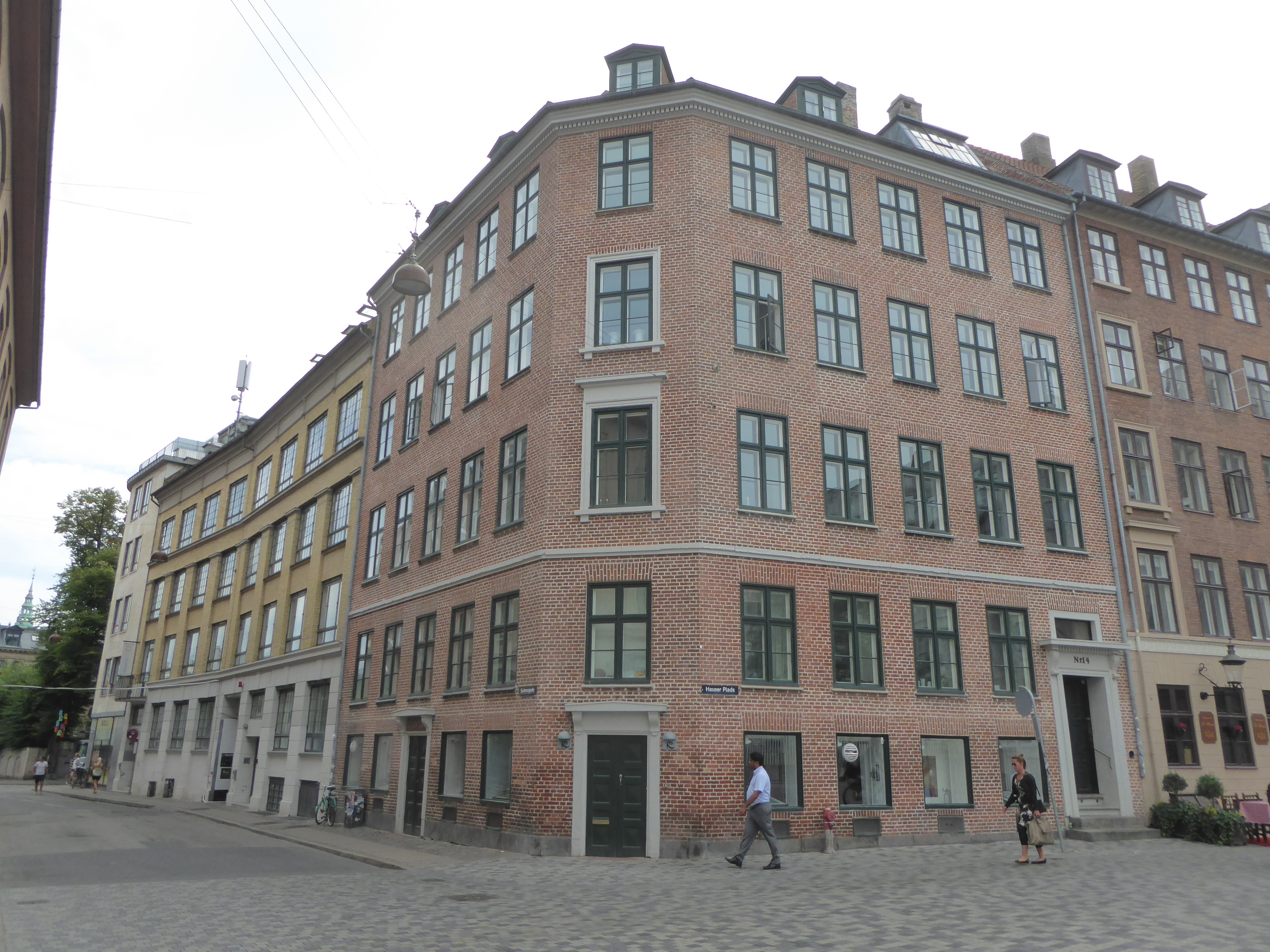
No. 5

No. 4 was built for the school Vestre Betalingsskole in 1852 to design by P.C. Hagemann. The school at previously been located at Nørregade 41. It moved to Vester Voldgade and changed its name to Vester Voldgades Betalingsskole in 1890. The building in Suhmsgade is now home to Annemone Teatret.

The building at the corner with Hauser Plads Suhmsgade 5/Hauser Plads 14) was built in 1855–56 by Mads Schifter Holm and was listed in 1945.

The building at Suhmsgade 1-3-3b-c is from 1884. Suhmsgade 2 / Landemærket 19-25 is from 1966.
