= Conrad Hauser =

Swiss-Danish merchant, developer and philanthropist

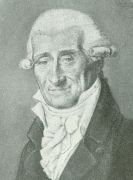
- Conrad Hauser painted by Liepmann Fraenckel in 1816
- Born: 16 February 1743; Basel
- Died: 14 December 1824 (aged 81)
- Occupations: merchant, developer and phillantrophist

Conrad Caspar Hauser (16 February 1743 – 14 December 1824) was a Swiss-Danish merchant, developer and philanthropist. He contributed to the rebuilding of Copenhagen after the British bombardment of the city in 1807, building many of the houses on Hauser Plads which was later named after him. He was director of the Danish Asiatic Company from 1815 to 1824.

== Early life and education ==
Hauser was born in Basel, the son of Rudolph Hauser (died 1766) and Catharina König (1708–1786). At an early age he settled as a merchant in Marseille.

== Career ==
Hauser became acquainted with the Danish envoy in Algier, Andreas Æreboe, and later married his sister. He was of assistance to a number of Danish naval ships stationed in the Mediterranean Sea and in 1776, upon recommendation of admiral Simon Hooglant, he was appointed as Royal Danish Agent with the title of kommerceråd on condition that he would establish a trading house in Kiel. Hauser decided instead to move to Copenhagen where he joined Reinhard Iselin's trading house. Hauser presented Heinrich Carl von Schimmelmann with a plan for the establishment of a Danish West India Company which was established by royal charter on 11 May 1778 with Hauser as managing director.

Hauser lost some of his considerable wealth in connection with the financial crisis of 1813. He was a director of the Danish Asiatic Company from 1815 to 1823.

== Property ==
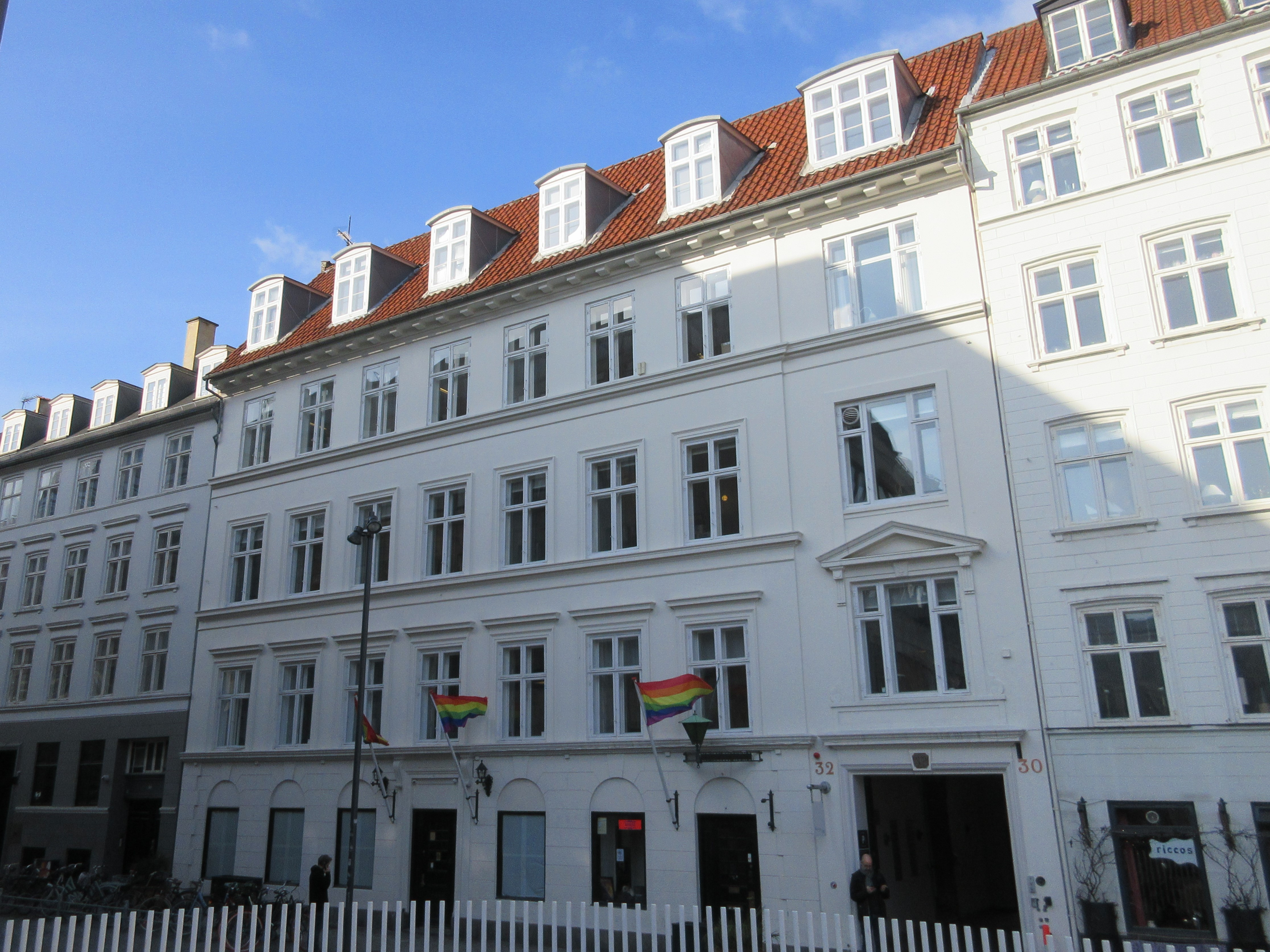
Hauser's former home at Hausers Plads 32

Hauser lived at Åbenrå 41 from 1804 to 1913. After the bombardment of Copenhagen in 1807, Hauser purchased a number of lots with destroyed buildings in the area between Kultorvet and the street Åbenrå. He constructed a new street at the site which was given the name Hausergade after him in 1811. In 1819 he converted an undeveloped site at its eastern end into a new square, naming it Suhms Plads after the historian Peter Frederik Suhm who had lived at the site. The square was colloquially known as Hausers Plads and this name was officially adopted in the 1830s. From 1913, Hauser's own house was the still-existing building at Hausers Plads 32.

== Personal life ==
Hauser was married twice. His first wife was Karen Æreboe (1729–1810), daughter of notarius publicus Rasmus Æreboe (1685–1744) and Catharina M. Aisberg (1706–1754). They married on 6 March 1768 in Marseille. His second wife was Cicilia Marie Ludvigsen (1768–1844), daughter of byfoged of Kalundborg Ulrich Christian Ludvigsen (1725–1800) and Karen Cathrine Dietrichson (1740–1824). They married on 15 August 1813 in the Church of Our Lady in Copenhagen.

Hauser belonged to the German Reformed congregation. He died on 14 December 1824 and is buried at Assistens Cemetery.
