= Hauser Plads =

Public square in Copenhagen, Denmark

Coordinates: 55.6832°N 12.5759°E

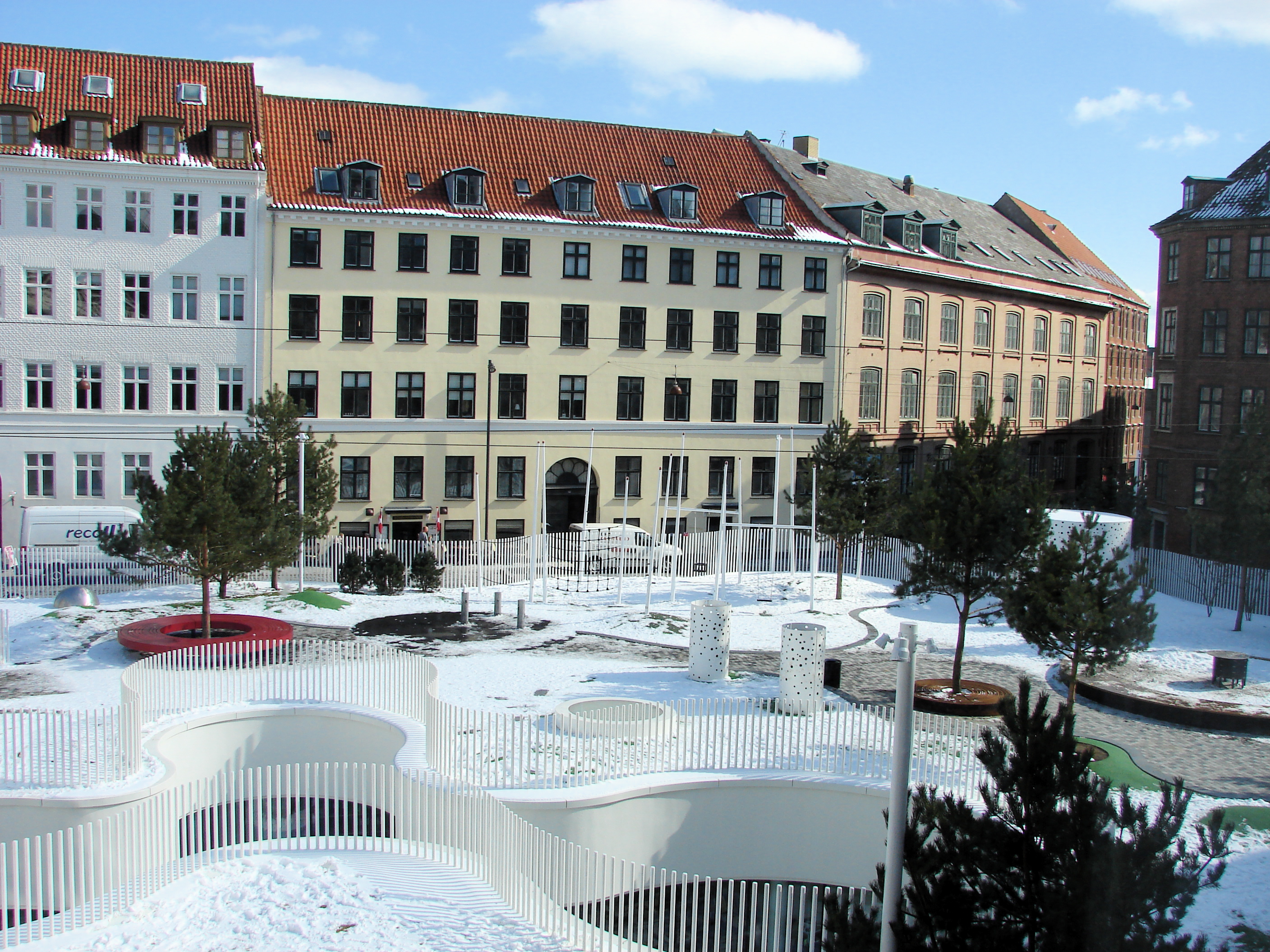
Hauser Plads

Hauser Plads is a public square in the Old Town of Copenhagen, Denmark. It is separated from the larger, more well-known square Kultorvet by the former Copenhagen Central Library Building. A landscaped playground and Copenhagen Municipality's underground Cleaning Facilities Centre occupies most of the site since a renovation in 2011.

Hauser Plads was created as a result of the British bombardment of Copenhagen in 1807, which resulted in large damages on the city centre. The site was then for many years used for handling and storage of timber in connection with the rebuilding of the city. It was not laid out as an official square until the 1840s, making Hauser Plads the youngest public square in the Old Town of Copenhagen.

== History ==
=== Before the British bombardment of 1796 ===
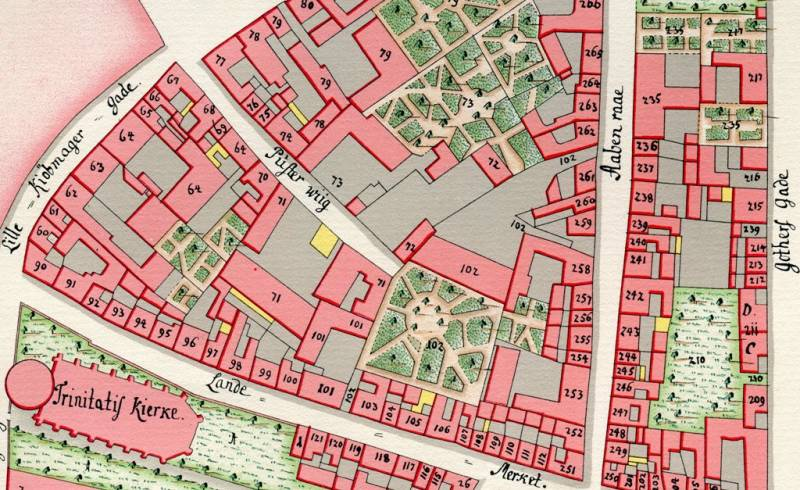
The area where Hauser Plads is located as seen on Gedde's district mak from 1757

St. Gertrud's Cemetery was located at the site in the 16th century but the area was later built over. Bolle Luddorph owned a property at the site. The street Pustervig was then a cul-de-sac.

The area was destroyed in the Copenhagen Fire of 1795. It had largely been rebuilt just five to 10 years later. It was just a few years later again destroyed in the British bombardment of the city in 1807. A workhouse operated by the city's Poor Authority (Fattigvæsnet) had until then been located on the site but it burned during the attack.

=== Creating the square, 1819–1830 ===
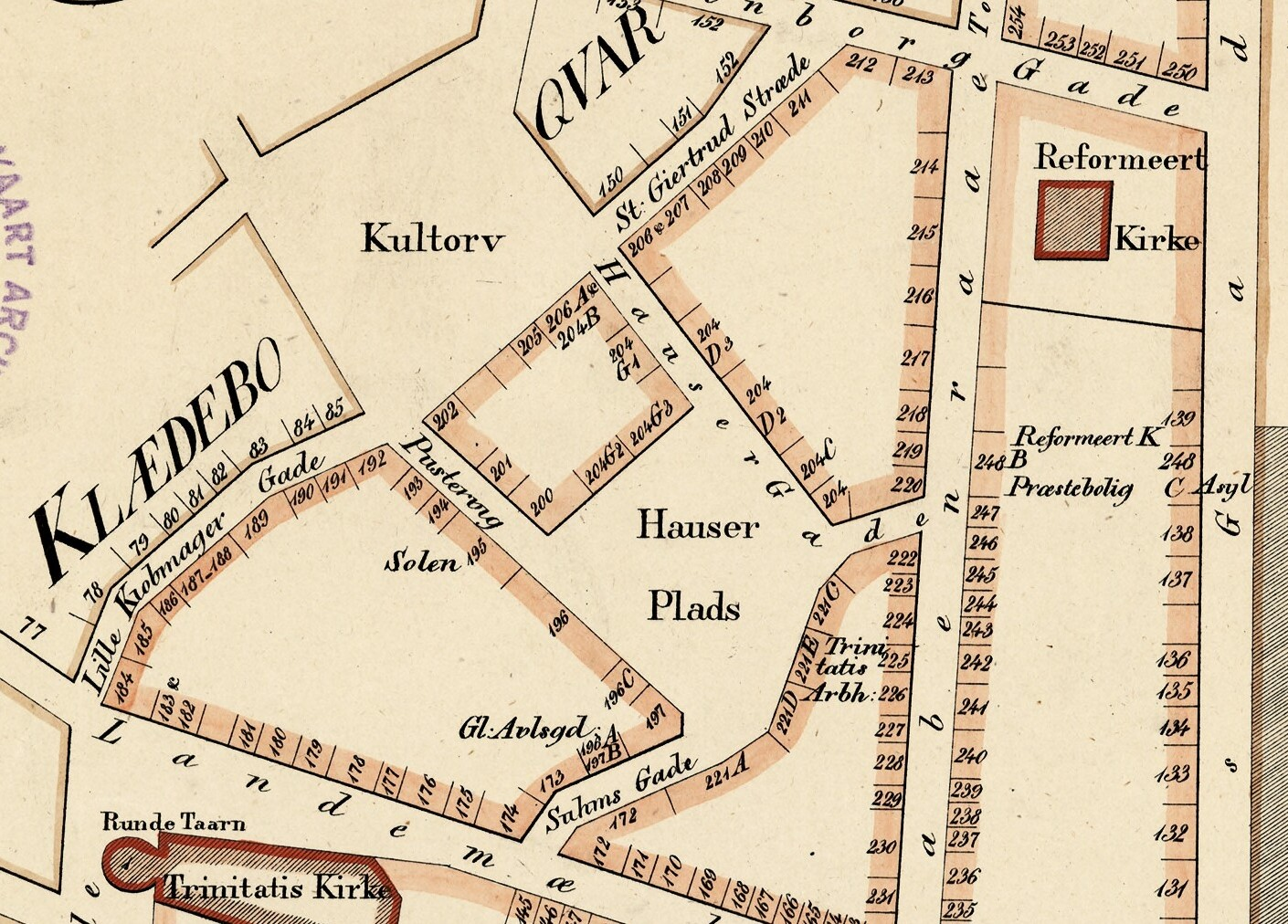
Hauser Plads seen on a detail of a cadestralm ap of Rosenborg Quarterm 1841.

In 1809, Conrad Caspar Hauser purchased some of the empty lots in the area. He was originally from Basel but had moved to Copenhagen after marrying the sister of the Danish ambassador to Algeria. The area where Hauser Plads is now located remained empty and was used for handling and storage of timber by the many craftsmen who worked on rebuilding the surrounding neighbourhood. Hauser's own house was completed in 1811.

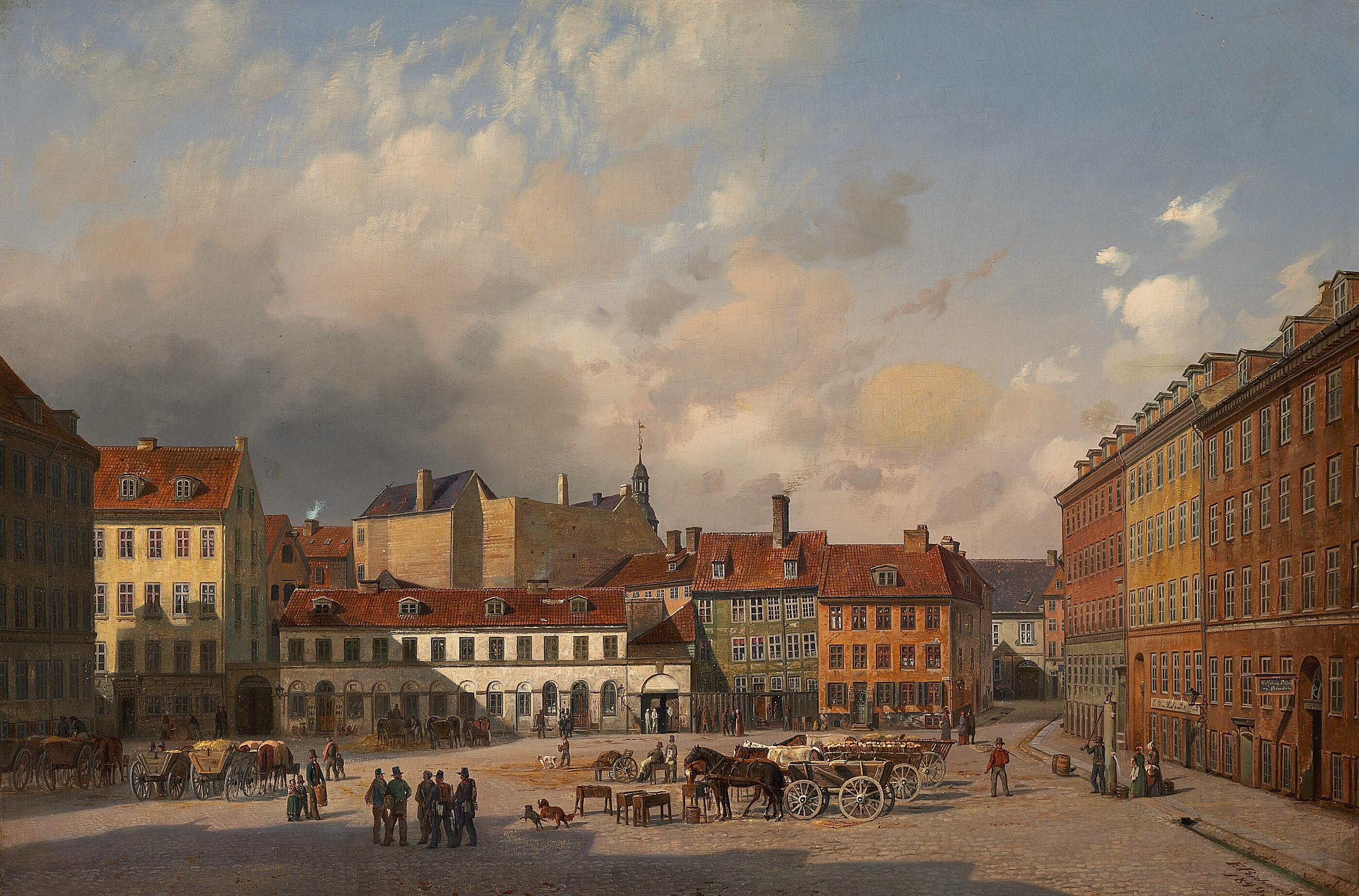
Ferdinand Richardt: Hauser Plads, 1849

It was first proposed to establish a proper square at the site in 1818, mainly to release the pressure on Kultorvet, the city's coal market, which became very busy on market days. City architect Peder Malling created a plan for the area. Hauser proposed that a fountain be included in the plans, an idea which was supported by the fire brigade. City architect Peder Malling made a design proposal for the fountain, featuring a lion's head, but it was never built and it would take until 1939 before the square was completed.

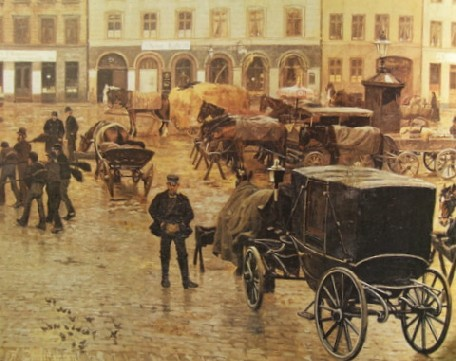
Hauser Plads in 1884, painting by Rasmus Christiansen

The square was formally called Suhrs Plads after the historian Peter Frederik Suhm who had lived at the site until his death in 1798 but this name never gained popularity. The square was instead colloquially known as Hausers Pladsand this name was used when the first street signs was installed.

=== 20th and 21st centuries ===
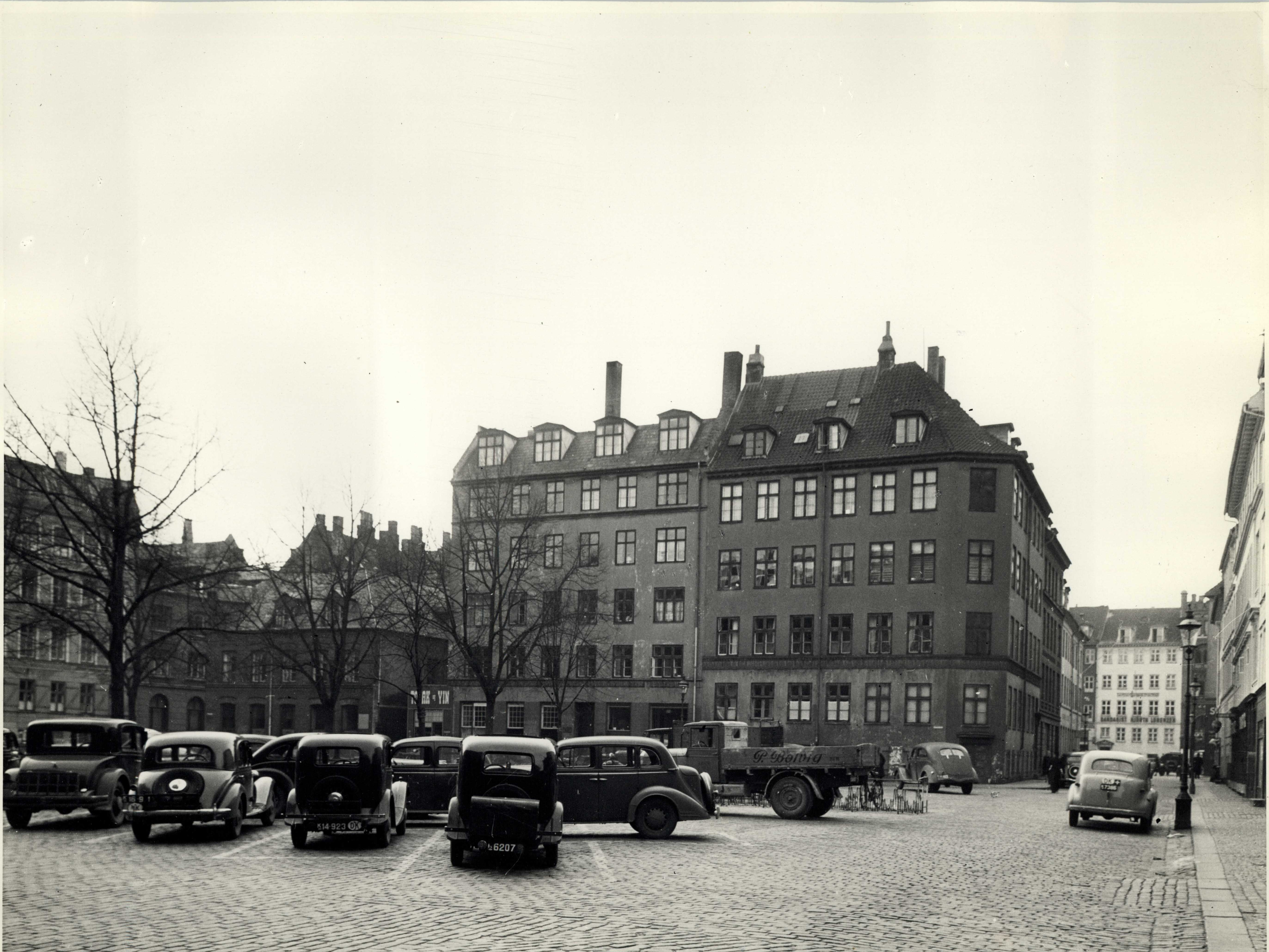
Hauser Plads in the 1910s The buildings that disappeared when the Central Library was built

In the 1950s, the buildings on the west side were demolished to make way for the new Central Library. The buildings that disappeared were a house row from the 1830s. The new building was completed in 1957 to designs by.

The square was renovated in 2011 as part of a project which also included Købmagergade and kultorvet. The design competition was won by Danish architectural firm Polyform in collaboration with Dutch Karres en Brands.

== Current square ==
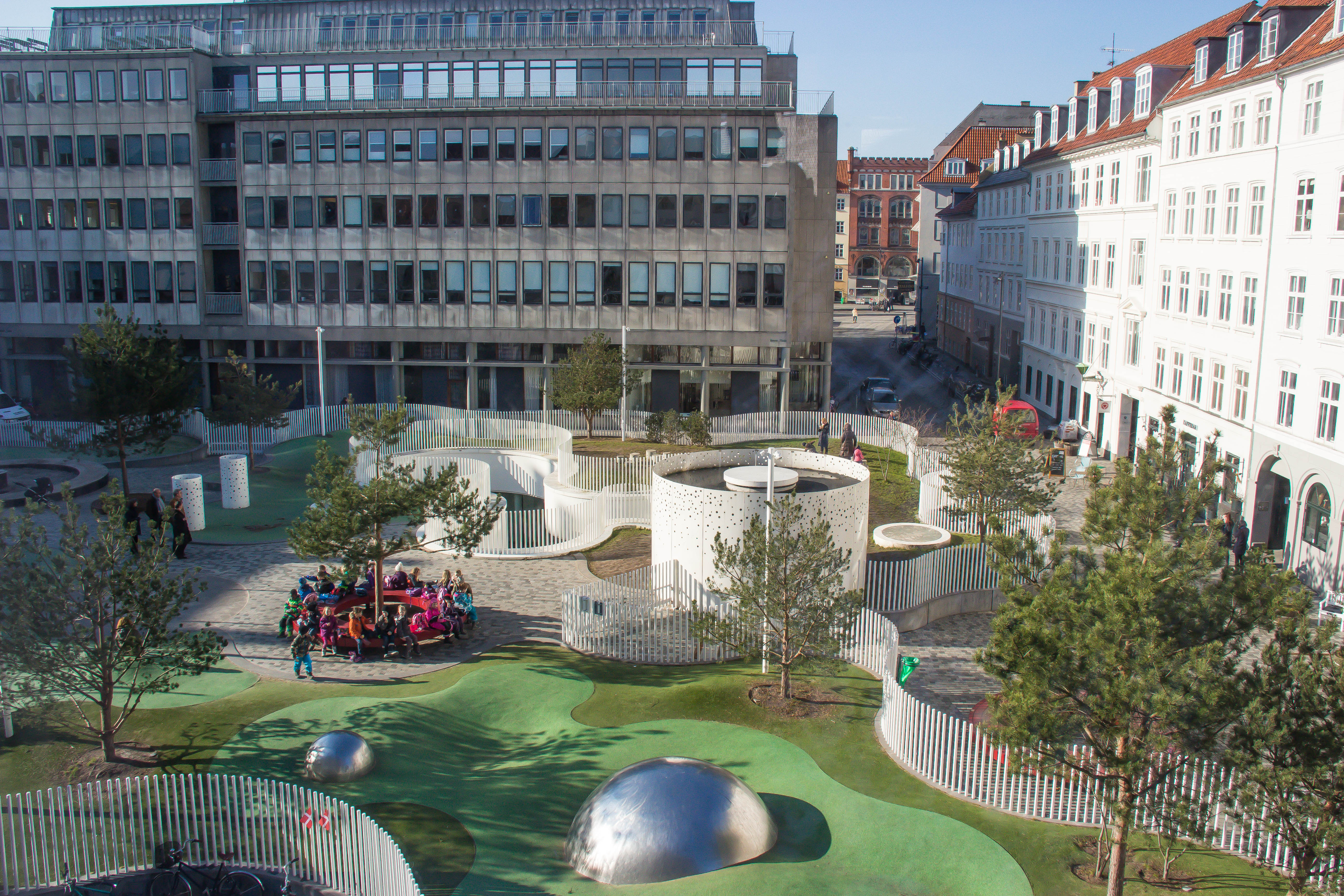
Hauser Plads with Hausergade (right) and the Library Building in the background

The project converted an underground parking facility into a new home for the City's Cleaning Facility Center (Center for Renhold). The premises open to a sunken central courtyard with an amoebic shape that optimize the influx of natural daylight. Facilities include offices, canteen, showers, changing rooms and parking spaces. The courtyard is surrounded by a landscaped playground.

== Notable buildings and residents ==
Namesake Conrad Caspar Hauser's house from 1811 is located at No. 32. He also constructed a warehouse which is located to the rear. The façade on Hauser Plads was altered in about 1870. The buildings were listed together with the neighbouring buildings at No. 28 and No. 30 in 1929/1945.

The only building that dates from the time before the bombardment in 1807 is No. 24, on the corner of Åbenrå, which dates from 1730. The buildings at No. 10–18 and No. 26 all date from the 1820s or 1830s and are listed. Restaurant Schønnemann at No. 16 has existed since 1870 and is one of the oldest smørrebrød restaurants in the city.

The beverage company State Drinks is based at No. 10.

== In culture ==
Hauser Plads is mentioned several times in Søren Kierkegaard's Stages on Life's Way. In Section 3, the narrator explains that he used to visit Hauser Plads every Wednesday at 4 am.

== See also ==
- List of squares in Copenhagen
