= Hans Holtermann =

Norwegian businessman and landowner

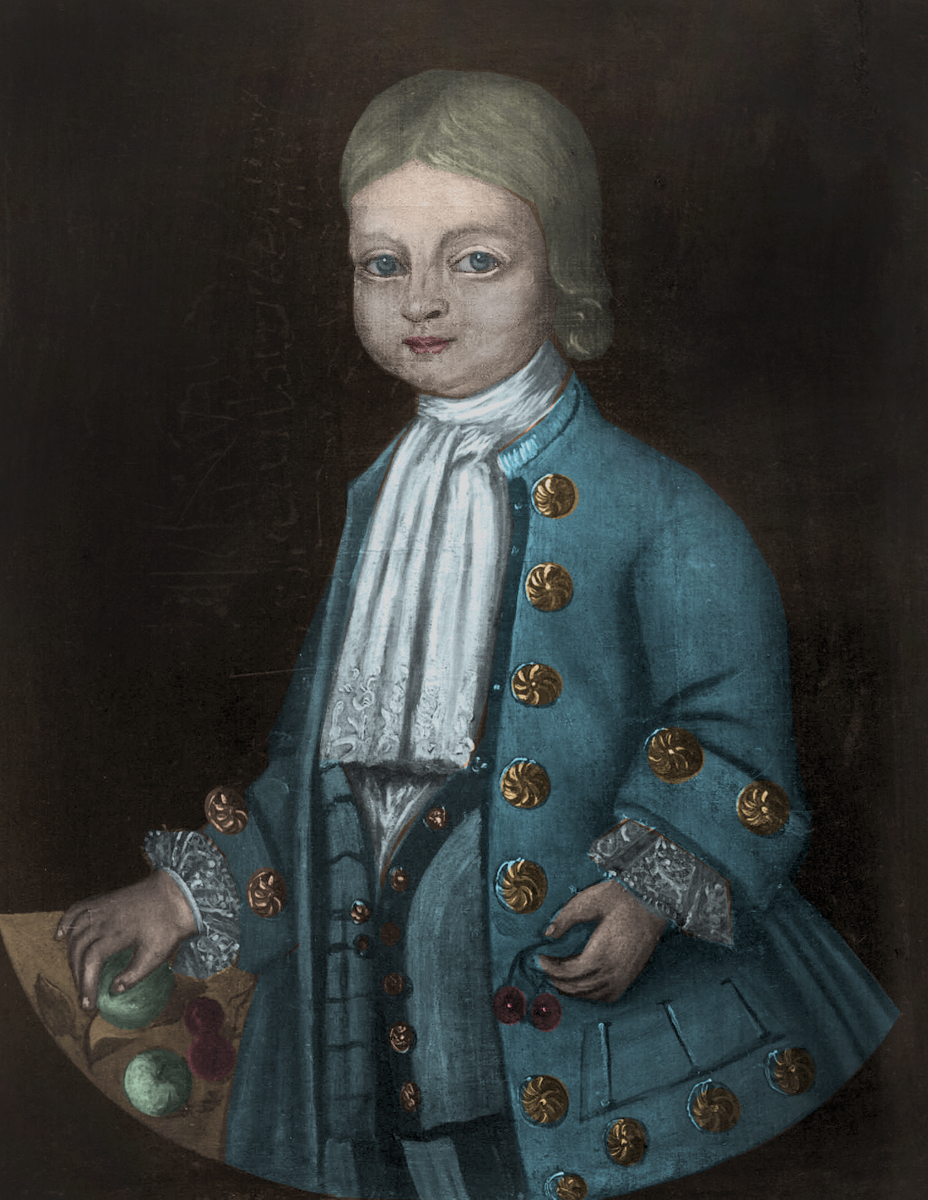
- Born: c. 1709; Denmark–Norway
- Died: 1781 (aged c. 72)
- Children: Knut

Hans Holtermann (c. 1709 – 1781) also known as Hans Henrik Holtermann or Hans Henriksen Holtermann, was a Norwegian businessman and landowner.

== Biography ==
Hans Holtermann was from a family of traders and whole merchants on the west coast of Norway. Holtermann's great-grandfather, Coert Holtermann, is believed to have first immigrated from Rothenburg in Germany to Bergen with his son Henrich Holtermann (1650–1730). They acquired citizenship in 1676 and became involved in trading. Hans Holtermann's father, Henrik Holtermann (1683–1728), acquired trading rights in Bergen. At that time there was no market town (kjøpstad) in Sunnmøre and the Holtermans extended their privileges to Borgund and set up a trading post at Brunholmen that eventually became the nucleus of the town of Ålesund. Hans Holtermann operated as a trader in Molde and later at Vegsund in Borgund (now in Ålesund Municipality). He may also have introduced dried and salted cod (klippfisk) production and trade to the area.

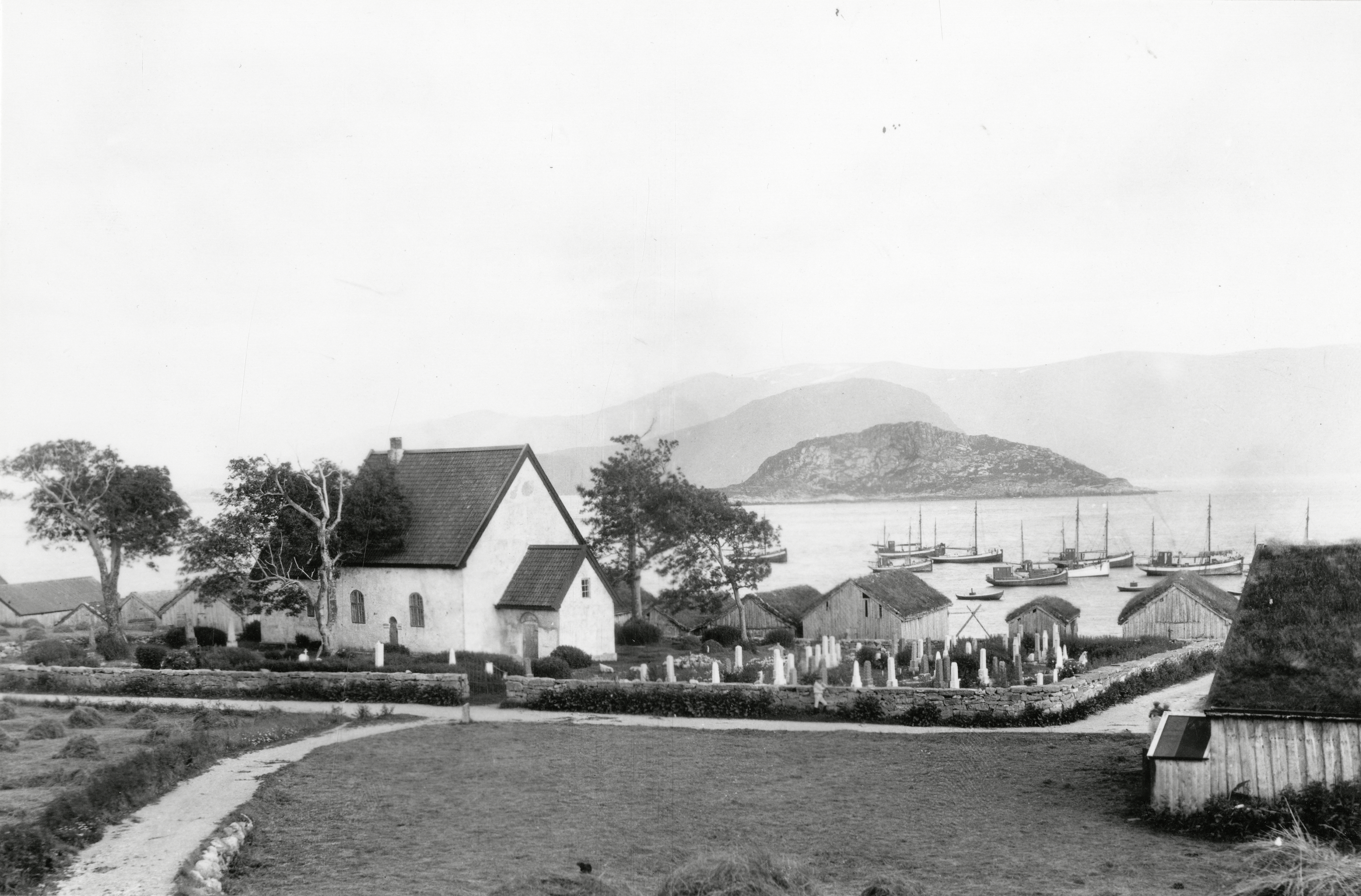
Holtermann was owner of Giske church and he paid for the restoration of the building. Photo by professor Johan Meyer (1860–1940)

His first marriage was to Margaretha Knudsdatter Wiig (from Vik in Ørsta, 1692–1743). His second marriage was to Ingeborg Catharine (a.k.a. Cathrina, Cathrine) Hagerup (August 30, 1730 – 1796), the daughter of Bishop Eiler Hagerup. Holtermann was the brother-in-law of the magistrate Melchior Falch, who was married to a younger daughter of Bishop Hagerup. His son, Knut Holtermann, became a supreme court judge in Copenhagen (the capital of Denmark-Norway).

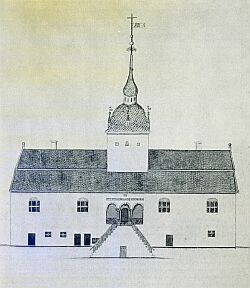
Holtermann purchased the Austrått estate in 1760 and settled there. Drawing by Gerhard Schøning around 1770

Hans Holtermann purchased parts of the Giske estate around 1750, and in 1760, Austrått manor in Ørland. Holtermann is believed to have paid 26,000 riksdaler for Austrått. The Austrått manor also included part or full ownership of a large number of smaller farms in the Ørland region. Hans Holtermann hosted king Christian VI of Denmark-Norway on the King's famous journey through Norway in 1733.

Upon purchasing the Giske estate (Giskegodset), Holtermann had also become the owner of Giske Church, and together with Hans Strøm he carried out a major restoration of the dilapidated building. After the restoration, Hans Strøm had an epitaph written, including the following praise of Holtermann: Sikkert var gudshuset faldt, / glemt som det var alverden, / hadde ei Holtermann faat, / den gjæve eier og værge, / reist dig til fordums magt. / Og kongen har arbeidet bifaldt. / Nu, o kirke, vil du, / frelst kunne synge Guds pris. (Certainly this house of worship fell, / Forgotten by the whole world, / A Holtermann received it, / A princely owner and guardian, / And raised thee to thy former might. / And the king approved of the work. / Now, oh Church, saved, / May you sing God's praises.)
