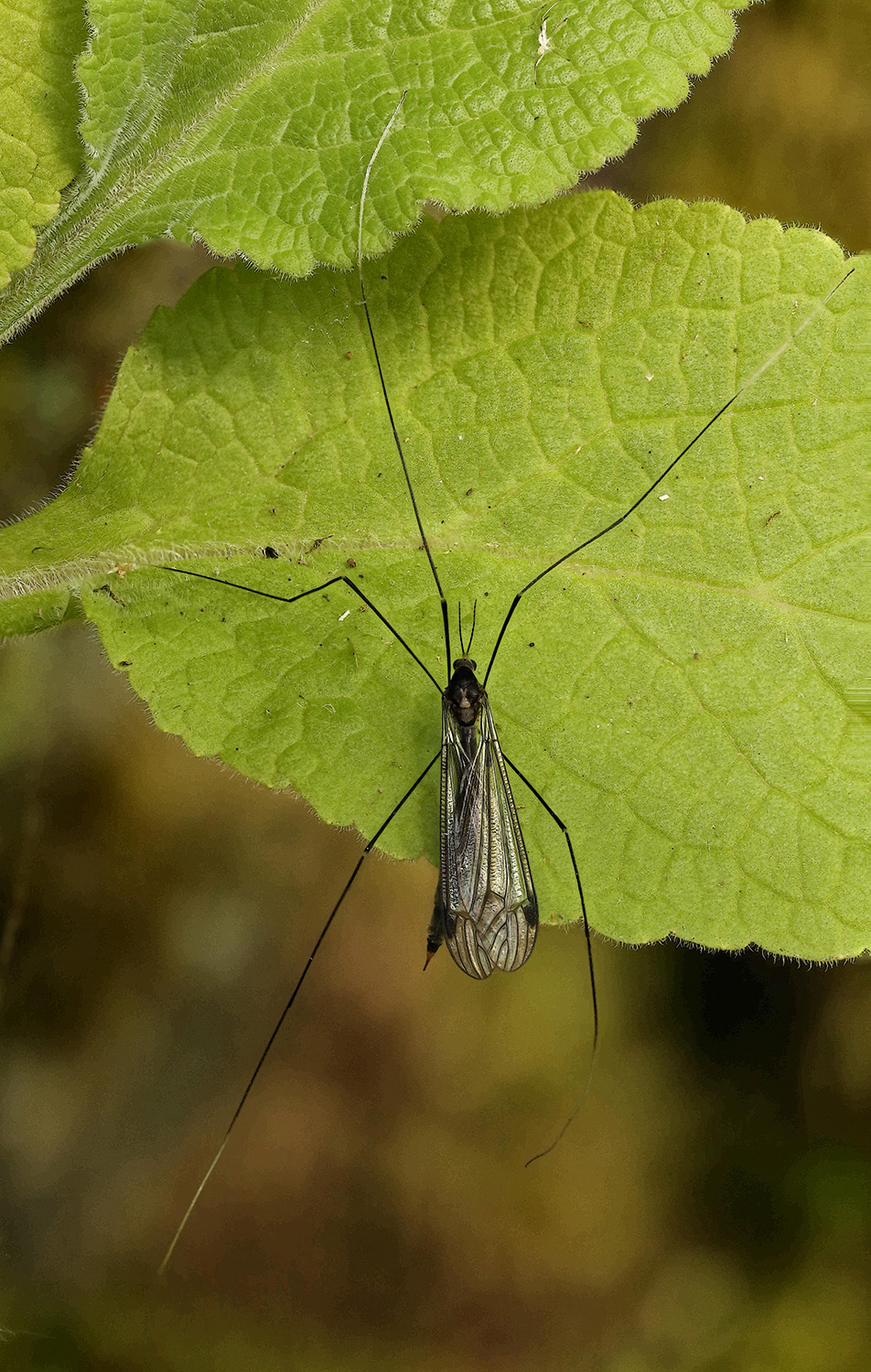
- Dolichopeza albipes

Scientific classification
- Kingdom: Animalia
- Phylum: Arthropoda
- Clade: Pancrustacea
- Class: Insecta
- Order: Diptera
- Family: Tipulidae
- Subfamily: Dolichopezinae; Kertész, 1902

Genera
- See text

= Dolichopezinae =

Subfamily of flies

Dolichopezinae is a subfamily of true crane fly.

== Genus ==
- Dolichopeza Curtis, 1825
- Hovapeza Alexander, 1951
