= Benjamin Dass =

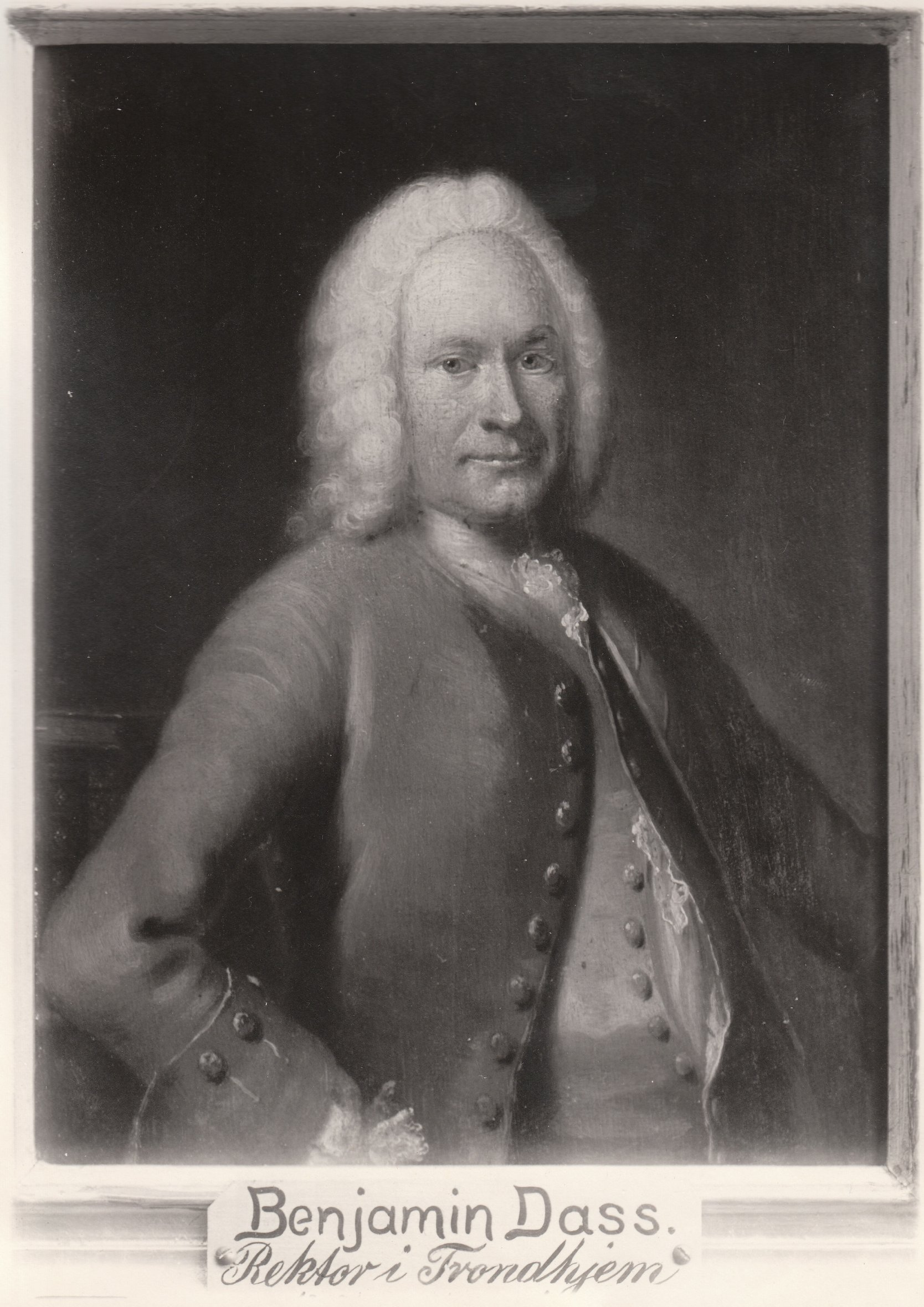
- Picture of Dass
- Born: 15 August 1706; Herøy, Norway
- Died: 5 May 1775 (aged 68)
- Occupations: Educator and scholar

Benjamin Dass (15 August 1706 – 5 May 1775) was a Norwegian educator and scholar who served as Rector of Trondheim Cathedral School.

Dass was born at Skar farm (Skar i Alstahaug) in what is now Herøy Municipality in Nordland county, Norway. He was the son of Jacob Benjaminsson Dass and Maria Volquartz. His father was a nephew of poet-priest Petter Dass (1647–1707). His mother was a sister of Marcus Carstensen Volqvartz (1678–1720) who was a priest in Trondheim. In 1719, Thomas von Westen (1682–1727), who had founded the Seminarium Lapponicum in Trondheim, took an interest in him and had him enrolled at the Trondheim Cathedral School. In 1726, he entered the University of Copenhagen. Towards the end of his nine-year stay in Copenhagen, he was admitted to Borchs Kollegium where he came in contact with Hans Gram (1685–1748) who was manager of the Danish Royal Library and the secretary of the Royal Archives.

In 1734, he was contacted by the Bishop of Trondheim and offered the headmaster position at the Trondheim Cathedral School. In 1735, he took his magister degree with honor and moved to Trondheim. Several of his school reforms were implemented in the 1739 Educational Act (Folkeskoleloven) of King Christian VI of Denmark who had visited Trondheim in 1733. Among other provisions, the law designated compulsory school attendance for children. Dass retired in 1750 and was succeeded as rector by his former student, Gerhard Schøning. In 1753 moved to Copenhagen. From 1757 he began to develop health problems and in 1775 he died in Copenhagen. After his death, parts of his large book collection were donated to the Gunnerus Library (Gunnerusbiblioteket) at the University of Trondheim.
