= Melchior Falch =

Norwegian jurist and civil servant

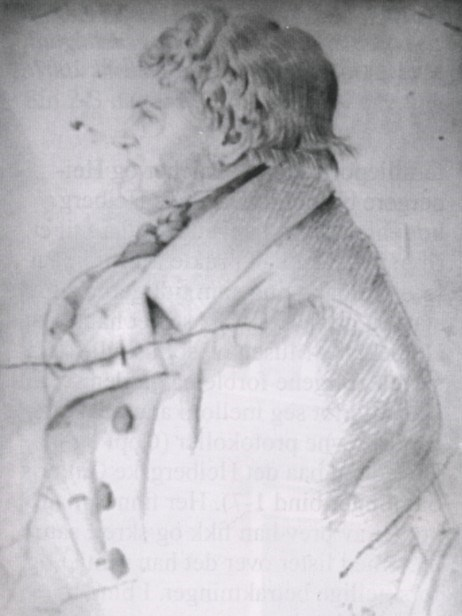
Melchior Falch

Melchior Michaelsen Falch (1720 – September 14, 1791) was a Norwegian jurist and magistrate in Sogndal in Nordre Bergenhus, Norway. He was interested in promoting fisheries, and in 1775 he received an award for a work on Norwegian fisheries.

== Family and education ==
Falch was the son of Michael Melchiorsøn Falch (died 1768) and Mette Marie Heiberg (1699–1766). He received a law degree in Copenhagen in 1747, and on March 19, 1753 he married Anna Sophie Bitsch (1726-1755). He inherited the Heiberg estate of Øvre Amla in the parish of Kaupanger (Amble gaard) from his parents (present-day Sogndal Municipality). The property was rented out from 1754 to 1779, while Falch lived in the village of Borgund. In 1759, Falch acquired the farm Djupvika in Borgund which he operated as a model farm.

On August 25, 1756 he married again, to Christi(a)ne Margrethe Hagerup (1732–1795), and they had the following children: Anna Sophie Falch (1759–1830), Michael Melchiorsen Falch (1762–?), Hans Christian Falch (1764–?), Melchior Falch (1768–1849), and Cathrine Marie Helene Harboe Falch (1770–1854, who married Hans Knagenhjelm Daae). Falch's wife Christine was the daughter of Bishop Eiler Hagerup and she was also the cousin of Hans Strøm. Falch was the brother-in-law of Hans Holtermann, who was married to an older daughter of Bishop Hagerup.

== Career ==
Falch paid for the construction of a school in Bergen known as the Seminarium Fredericianum. In gratitude he was made the district magistrate for Sunnmøre in 1754, a position he would hold for the next twenty five years.

Falch also earned much money for his work in developing the fishing industry. He was also active as a writer and in 1769 he became a member of the Royal Norwegian Society of Sciences and Letters in Trondheim. On November 2, 1773 he co-founded one of Norway's first nonprofit organizations: the Sunnmøre Practical Agricultural Society (Norwegian: Syndmøre practiske Landhuusholdningsselskab). Hans Strøm and other clergy also participated in the work. It was modeled on the Royal Danish Agricultural Society (established in 1769) and similar societies in other European countries. The society's mission was to promote economic development, especially in agriculture. Its main activity was educational, such as handing out pamphlets and useful premiums (2 to 4 riksdaler) to farmers that carried out recommended measures to improve production. The society went into decline when Falch and Strøm left Sunnmøre in 1779.

== Works ==
- Beregning over hvad Træ-Materialier Søndmør aarlig behøver (Calculation of Sunnmøre's Annual Thread Requirement; 1784)
- Om Fyrre- og Gran-Skovene i Norge (Pine and Spruce Forests in Norway; 1784)
- Om Torske Vaar-Fiskeriet paa Sundmøer (The Spring Cod Fishery in Sunnmøre; 1788)
- Afhandling om Fiskerierne i Norge, i Særdeleshed om de søndmørske, og Fiske-Grundene uden for Landet (Thesis on the Fisheries in Norway, Especially That of Sunnmøre and Fishing-Grounds outside the Country; 1790)
