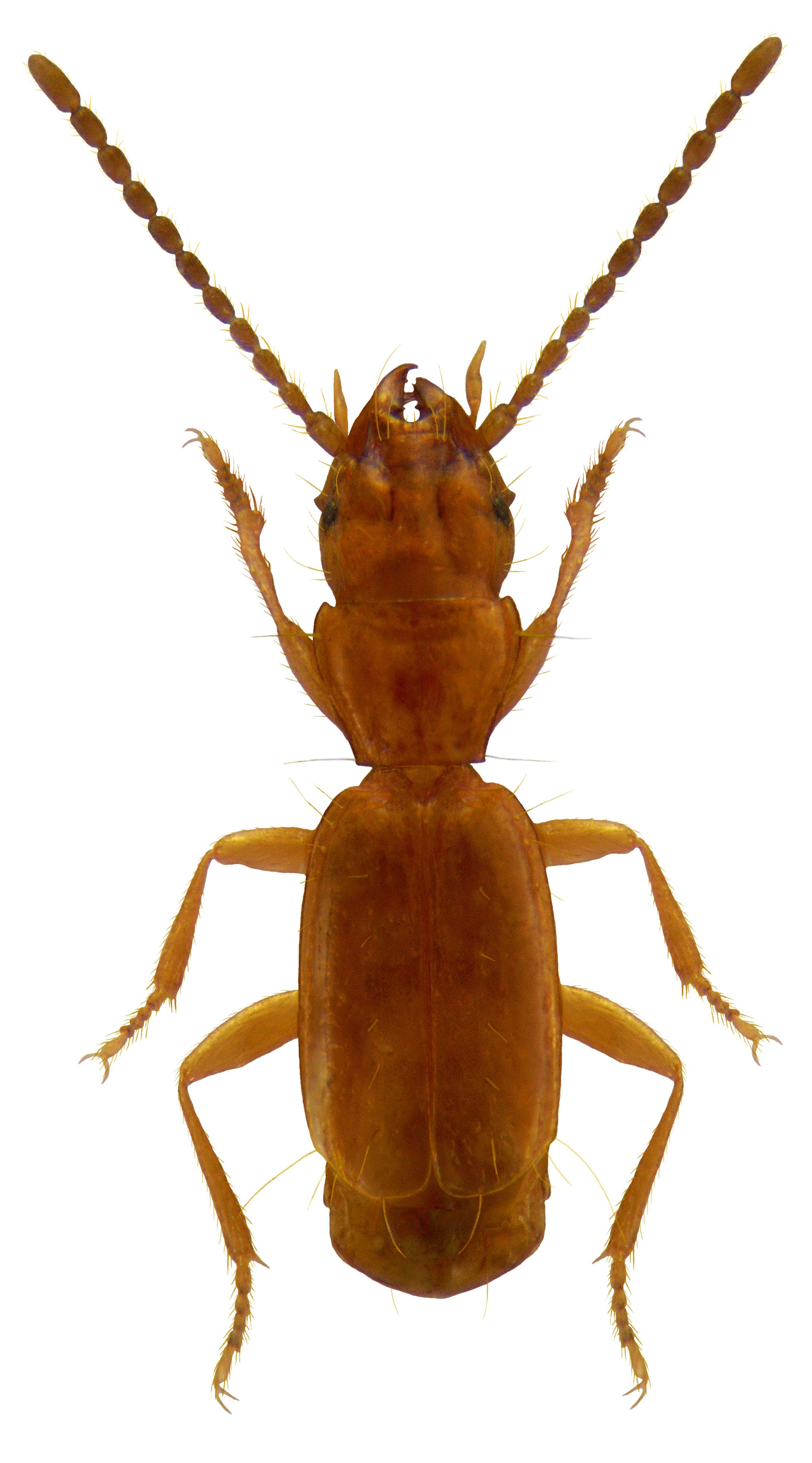

Scientific classification
- Domain: Eukaryota
- Kingdom: Animalia
- Phylum: Arthropoda
- Class: Insecta
- Order: Coleoptera
- Suborder: Adephaga
- Family: Carabidae
- Genus: Aepus
- Species: A. marinus

Binomial name
- Aepus marinus Stroem, 1783

= Aepus marinus =

Species of beetle

Aepus marinus is a species of beetle in the family Carabidae. It is found in the intertidal zone of marine habitats in northwestern Europe where it lives in crevices and under stones. The adult beetle is about 2.5 mm (0.1 in) in length, and is a reddish-yellow colour.

== Description ==
Aepus marinus is a very small beetle, with adults reaching a length of about 2.5 mm (0.1 in). The head is relatively large while the thorax is rather small and shaped like an isosceles triangle, with the base at the front and the apex at the rear. There is a deep furrow in the centre of the dorsal surface of the thorax. The elytra are narrowed at the front and shorter than the abdomen, and are sculptured with indistinct short striae (narrow grooves or channels) and puncture marks. The legs are long, as are the antennae, which are shaped like a string of beads.

== Distribution and habitat ==
The species is found throughout northwestern Europe, in countries such as France, Great Britain, Ireland, Norway and Sweden. It is only found in marine habitats, on beaches between the middle of the intertidal zone and the extreme high water mark reached by spring tides. It lives beneath overhangs, in rock crevices and under stones embedded in clayey gravels and sands along the coastline, as well as occasionally in driftwood washed up at the tideline. Little light penetrates the locations where it is found and the eyes are rudimentary. It is most common high up the beach, and always above the Fucus zone, being mostly replaced lower down the beach by the closely related Aepus robini. In France, where it is known from a few locations in Brittany and Normandy, it has been found to be largely restricted to a strip a couple of metres wide bordering the upper limit of the spring tides.

== Ecology ==
Aepus marinus is a predator, feeding on small arthropods such as springtails. When the tide rises it retreats into pockets of air in crevices and under stones, emerging to forage when the water retreats. It can carry a bubble of air under its elytra enabling it to breathe when under water, and its adaptations enable it to recover more quickly after submergence than A. robini. It is active all year round, but the breeding period is probably between about April to September.
