= Gunnerus Library =

Library in Trondheim, Norway

Coordinates: 63.4288°N 10.3857°E

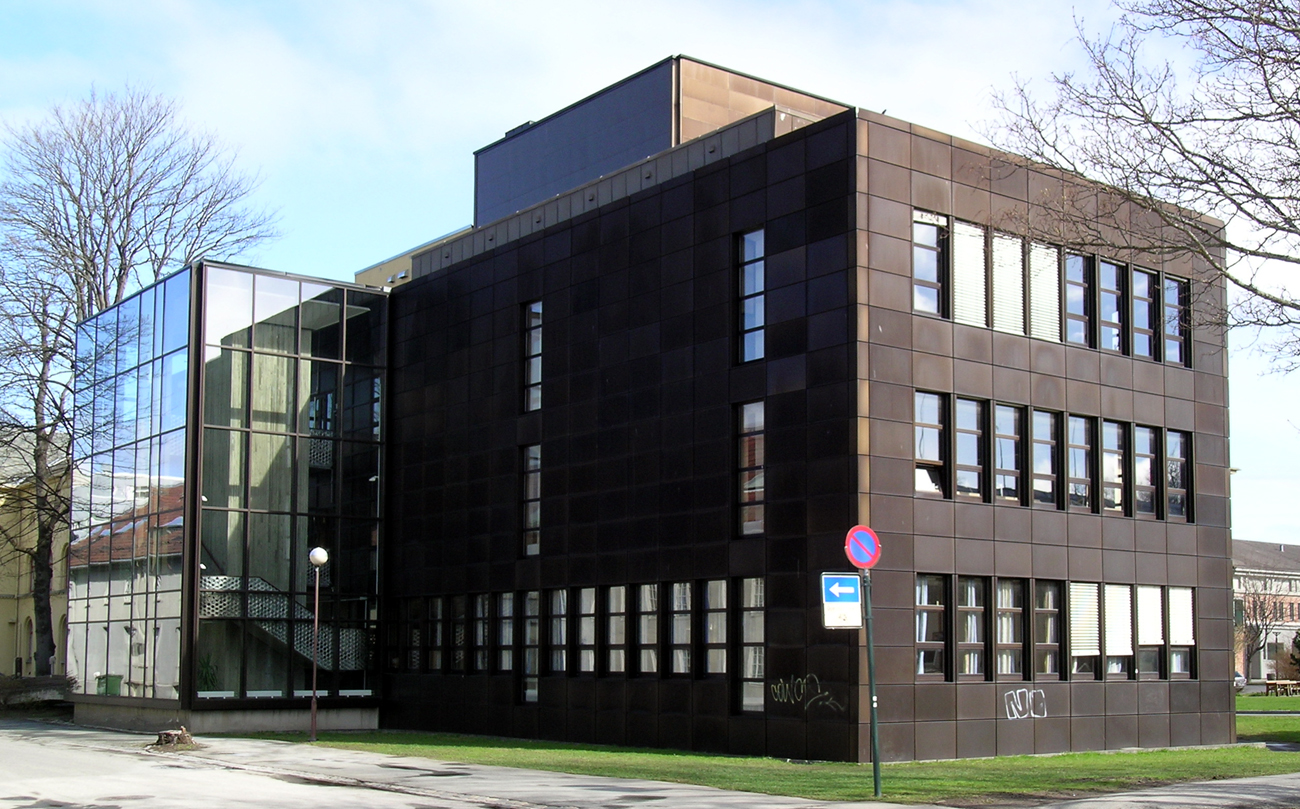
Part of the new building of Gunnerus Library which was built in 1974. Architect: Anne and Einar Myklebust

The Gunnerus Library in Trondheim is the oldest scientific library in Norway and dates back to 1768 when it was the library of the Royal Norwegian Society of Sciences and Letters (DKNVS). The library is named after bishop Johan Ernst Gunnerus (1718–1773).

The Gunnerus Library is among the most important historical libraries in Scandinavia due to its rich collection from the 18th century. It focuses especially on the academic fields of archaeology, botany and zoology, but is also a general scientific library with an extensive collections in the history of culture and sciences, as well as genealogy and local history. The library is open to the public and is mainly frequented by scientists and students from the NTNU and local historians.

The Gunnerus library is located in Trondheim's neighborhood of Kalvskinnet. It is based in the building of the DKNVS' library which dates back to 1866, and the new adjacent annexes which were later added in the years 1939 and 1975.

The library boasts a collection of photographs, maps, manuscripts and a huge holding of books dating back from the 15th century. The library also holds an extensive book collection which came from the Norwegian legal deposit and revised materials from the last one hundred years.

== History ==
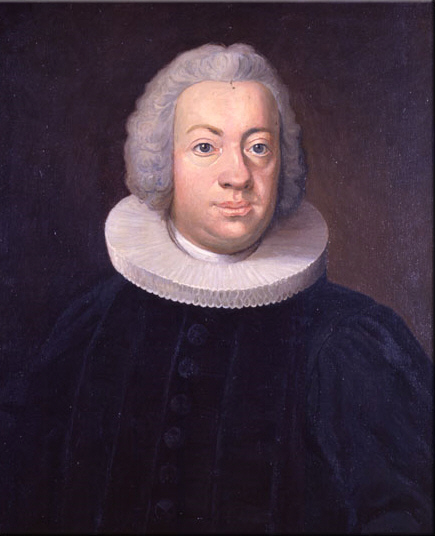
Johann Ernst Gunnerus

The year 1768 applies as the library's founding year because the Royal Norwegian Society of Sciences and Letters (DKNVS) hired Peter Daniel Baade as librarian. He was supposed to convey the book collection outwards. But Baade's employment was of short duration. Already after one month he got appointed as priest to Zealand in Denmark. That is the reason why Johan Ernst Gunnerus, the co-founder of the Society, became librarian, a position which he held until he died in 1773. At this time the library was located in Gunnerus' house at Dronningens gate.

According to the society's earliest statutes every new member had to pay 10 riksdaler or give two books within the same value to the library. That is how the library started to build its collection. But also testamentary inheritances were made, for example from Gerhard Schøning and Christopher Hammer.

At first the library was a research library only for members of the DKNVS but after a while it opened to the public. Until the year 1874 the collection was characterized by general science. That year brought a reform to the Society which introduced a new focus on literature. From then on the collection focused on the subjects botany, zoology, archeology and history.

The library history is closely connected with the museum, today's NTNU Museum of Natural History and Archaeology. Both became part of the University in Trondheim in 1968.

As part of the legal deposit the library got the requisition right for Norwegian printings in 1939. With this right the library of DKNVS in Trondheim and the Bergen Museum were able to claim in each case one copy of books from Norwegian publishers. The new legal deposit law in 1989 extended this right for all university libraries, among these also the Gunnerus Library and the NTNU University Library.

== Name ==
Since its founding the library got the name Library of the Royal Norwegian Society of Sciences and Letters. 1984 was the year when the official name University Library in Trondheim was given.

In 1996 the Norwegian University of Science and Technology was founded. The University Library became part of it from January 1997 on. The old library of the Royal Norwegian Society of Sciences and Letters became a branch library and got the name Gunnerus Library.

== Collection growth ==
Year	Growth	Inventory
1768		500
1779		2 600
1781	Gerhard Schøning collection	12 000
1783		15 000
1801	Christopher Hammer collection	23 000
1869		31 500
1902	Thorvald Boeck collection	31 500
1904		162 000
1929		176 000
1960	NLHT's collection 9 000
1990	Kleist' collection 1407
1993		ca 1 000 000

== See also ==
- List of libraries in Norway

== Sources ==
Til Opplysning : Universitetsbiblioteket i Trondheim 1768–1993 (Tapir forlag, 1993) ISBN 82-519-14671
