= Sunnmøre Practical Agricultural Society =

Norwegian patriotic and non-profit association

The Sunnmøre Practical Agricultural Society (Norwegian: Syndmøre practiske Landhuusholdningsselskab) was a patriotic and non-profit association with the goal of developing business and agriculture in Norway's Sunnmøre district. The society was established on November 2, 1773 by Melchior Falch in the village of Borgund. Falch and the priest Hans Strøm supported the initiative. The founding meeting was also attended by other officials and leading people at Sunnmøre, and several others joined later.

The society was inspired by the Royal Danish Agricultural Society. Among other things it promoted farmers' awards for useful measures and carried out educational work on improving agriculture and other industries in the district. The society was one of the first of its kind in Norway, and provided a model for similar associations elsewhere in the country. For example, in 1778 the society awarded prizes of 10 rix-dollars for stone livestock buildings, eight rix-dollars for newly tilled land, six rix-dollars for shooting six adult wolves, and five rix-dollars for potato cultivation. Falch himself operated a model farm in Borgund.

The society stagnated when Falch and Strøm left Sunnmøre in 1779, but efforts by Andreas Landmark revived the society's activities around 1802. Work in the society came to a complete standstill in 1816 for reasons that are not clear. The society was probably absorbed into the Royal Norwegian Welfare Society (Det Kongelige Selskap for Norges Vel). The Norwegian Welfare Society was established in 1809 with its own district committee for Sunnmøre, and this district committee contained the same persons (the provost Peter Daniel Baade, the magistrate Ole Severin Kildal, and the bailiff Andreas Landmark) as the leadership of the Practical Agricultural Society.

== Members ==
Those present at the founding meeting:

- Melchior Falch, magistrate
- Peder Nerem, provost
- Schieldrop, lieutenant
- Christian Meldal, priest
- Johannes Brun, priest (half-brother of Johan Nordahl Brun)
- Peder Finde Astrup from Spjelkavik
- Jens Lindorph, customs official
- Arnoldus Heide, merchant
- Andreas Luth, merchant
- Nils Hagerup, merchant
- Johannes Boldt, merchant
- Jochum C. Rode, merchant
- Ole Honningdal, merchant

Members that joined later:

- Sivert Aarflot, editor
- Ole Alsing, bailiff in Sunnmøre
- Nicolai Astrup (1748–1802), priest
- Johan Christopher Haar Daae, priest
- Claus Frimann, priest
- Christian F. Hagerup, provost, son of Eiler Hansen Hagerup
- Ole Sevrin Kildal, magistrate
- Joachim de Knagenhielm, county governor
- Ludolf Krohn, priest
- Andreas Landmark, bailiff
- Nils L. Landmark, magistrate and politician
- Ludvig Pontoppidan, priest, son of Erik Pontoppidan
- Carl Rønneberg, businessman
- Peter Frederik Suhm, historian
- Laurits Weidemann, official

Honorary members:

- Peter Daniel Baade, provost
- Johan Lausen Bull, jurist
- Ole Christian Bull, bailiff, poet
- Hilmar Meincke Krohg, county governor, representative at the Norwegian Constitutional Assembly
- Christian Ditlev Frederik Reventlow, count, minister
- Ole Hannibal Sommerfeldt, county governor
