= Dolichopeza subalbipes =

Scientific classification
- Domain: Eukaryota
- Kingdom: Animalia
- Phylum: Arthropoda
- Class: Insecta
- Order: Diptera
- Family: Tipulidae
- Genus: Dolichopeza
- Species: D. subalbipes

Binomial name
- Dolichopeza subalbipes (Johnson, 1909)

Synonyms
- Oropeza subalbipes Johnson, 1909

Species of fly

Dolichopeza subalbipes is a species of large crane fly in the family Tipulidae.
