= Aepus gallaecus =

Scientific classification
- Domain: Eukaryota
- Kingdom: Animalia
- Phylum: Arthropoda
- Class: Insecta
- Order: Coleoptera
- Suborder: Adephaga
- Family: Carabidae
- Genus: Aepus
- Species: A. gallaecus

Binomial name
- Aepus gallaecus Jeannel, 1926

Species of beetle

Aepus gallaecus is a species of beetle in the family Carabidae which is endemic to Spain.
