= Dolichopeza carolus =

Scientific classification
- Domain: Eukaryota
- Kingdom: Animalia
- Phylum: Arthropoda
- Class: Insecta
- Order: Diptera
- Family: Tipulidae
- Genus: Dolichopeza
- Species: D. carolus

Binomial name
- Dolichopeza carolus Alexander, 1940

Species of fly

Dolichopeza carolus is a species of large crane fly in the family Tipulidae.
