= Seminarium Fredericianum =

Preschool in Bergen, Norway

Coordinates: 60°23′34.796″N 5°19′56.035″E

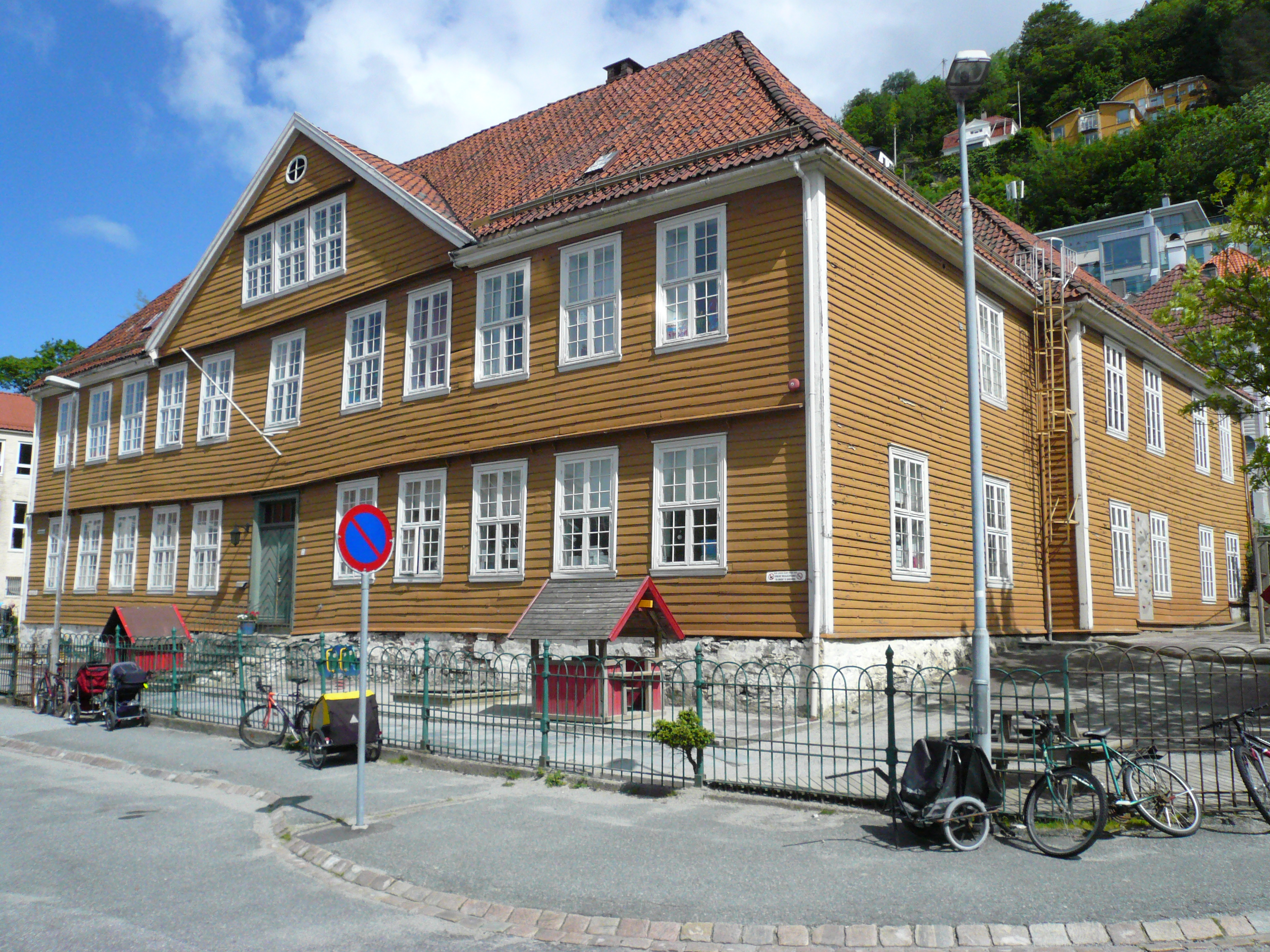
Seminarium Fredericianum

The Seminarium Fredericianum or Bergen Daycare (Norwegian: Bergens barneasyl) is located at Asylplass 2 in Bergen's Bergenhus district and today it houses Norway's oldest preschool.

== History ==
The Seminarium Fredericianum was established in 1750 by Bishop Erik Pontoppidan as a more secular education alternative for the children at the Latin school. In addition to teaching classical languages and the Bible, boys at the Seminarium Fredericianum also studied mathematics, physics, literature, moral philosophy, German, and French. The aim of the school was to professionalize the city's business community. Around 1780, the curriculum was expanded to include navigation and geography for the needs of tradesmen.

The name of the school honors King Frederick V of Denmark, who approved the plans in January 1750.

The building dates from 1752 and is Bergen's largest wooden building from the 1700s. The school was funded by the jurist Melchior Falch, in gratitude for which he was made the district magistrate for Sunnmøre in 1754.

Initially, twelve boys were granted tuition, room, and board at the school. The school never had a large attendance, and until 1778 only two or three boys studied there. In 1808 there were no students at all and the school was closed. The school's book collection, which initially numbered 1,300 volumes, was donated to the Latin school because of the closure.

For the next four years, the building was used as a military hospital. In 1812 the building was purchased by the Bergen Secondary School (Norwegian: Bergens Realskole), which operated there until 1846. From 1825 to 1831 the building was also used as storage for the collection of the Bergen Museum. A private girls' school also used the building from 1849 to 1851.

== Bergen Daycare ==
In 1851, the Bergen Daycare foundation took over the building. The foundation had been created 11 years earlier by Bishop Jacob Neumann for children below school age. Sales of a publication connected with the inauguration of the new Bergen Cathedral School allowed the bishop to raise 800 spesidaler in 1841 for its operation. In November the same year, the municipality launched the daycare activity in the old Latin school building.

The Bergen Daycare was intended to provide education to children from poor homes or to children whose parents had to work outside the home all day. There were up to 150 children two to seven years old at the center. The children were supervised by volunteers, mostly women from the families of civil servants. Altogether, 48 women worked in pairs caring for the children. Teaching at the center was mostly performed by teachers that worked for free. The girls received training in sewing and singing, and the boys in reading, writing, singing, and physical education. Enrollment at the child care center cost two skilling a day. For poor children, it was possible to be "adopted" by wealthier citizens that paid for their stay.

The West Norway Museum of Decorative Art also used the building for exhibitions from 1889 to 1896.

The building received cultural heritage protection in 1927.

Today the Bergen Daycare is a private daycare with full-time accommodation for 81 children. The building is owned by the Seminarium Fredericianum foundation.
