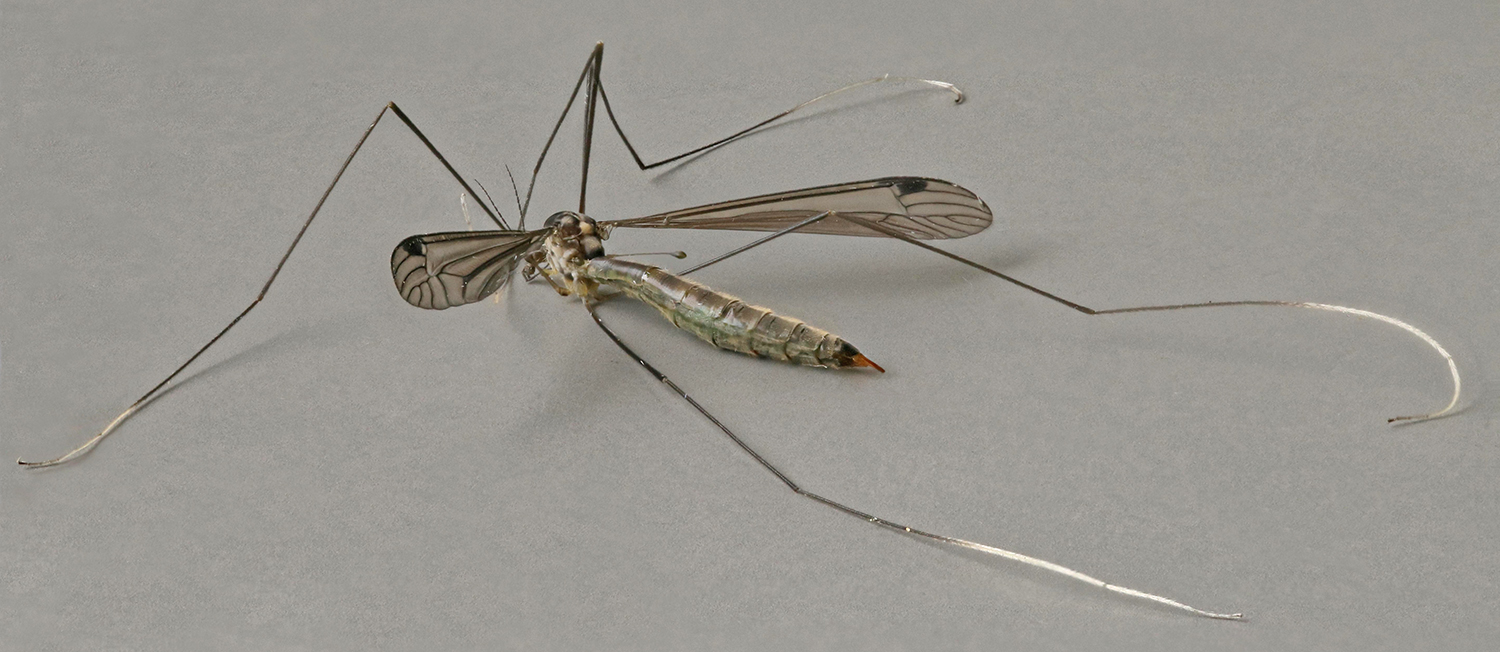
- Dolichopeza albipes

Scientific classification
- Kingdom: Animalia
- Phylum: Arthropoda
- Clade: Pancrustacea
- Class: Insecta
- Order: Diptera
- Family: Tipulidae
- Subfamily: Dolichopezinae
- Genus: Dolichopeza; Curtis, 1825

Type species
- Dolichopeza sylvicola Curtis, 1825 [= albipes (Strom, 1768)]

Subgenera
- Afrodolichopeza Alexander, 1956; Dolichopeza Curtis, 1825; Eudolichopeza Alexander, 1956; Eunesopeza Alexander, 1934; Megistomastix Alexander, 1912; Mitopeza Edwards, 1916; Nesopeza Alexander, 1914; Oropeza Needham, 1908; Prodolichopeza Alexander, 1963; Sinoropeza Alexander, 1935; Trichodolichopeza Alexander, 1917

Synonyms
- Apeilesis Macquart, 1846

= Dolichopeza =

Genus of flies

Dolichopeza is a genus of true crane fly. It is the only genus in the subfamily Dolichopezinae.

== Species ==
- Subgenus Afrodolichopeza Alexander, 1956
  - D. altivaga Alexander, 1956
  - D. anitra Alexander, 1956
  - D. fidens Alexander, 1956
  - D. marlieri Alexander, 1956
- Subgenus Dolichopeza Curtis, 1825
  - D. aequalis Theischinger, 1993
  - D. albescens Alexander, 1937
  - D. albipes (Strom, 1768)
  - D. americana Needham, 1908
  - D. annulipes Skuse, 1890
  - D. anthema Alexander, 1971
  - D. asymmetrica Theischinger, 1993
  - D. atropos (Hudson, 1895)
  - D. austrocaledonica Alexander, 1948
  - D. ballaratiensis Dobrotworsky, 1974
  - D. berrimilla Theischinger, 1993
  - D. bibasis Alexander, 1971
  - D. bickeli Theischinger, 1993
  - D. boogoo Theischinger, 1993
  - D. borealis Byers, 1961
  - D. brevifurca Skuse, 1890
  - D. cairnensis Alexander, 1934
  - D. cinerea (Macquart, 1846)
  - D. collessi Theischinger, 1993
  - D. corinnaiensis Dobrotworsky, 1974
  - D. corybantes Alexander, 1956
  - D. cuthbertsoniana Alexander, 1945
  - D. cyatheti Alexander, 1934
  - D. danbulla Theischinger, 1993
  - D. davidsoni Alexander, 1930
  - D. directa Theischinger, 1993
  - D. distigma (Speiser, 1909)
  - D. distivena Alexander, 1971
  - D. dorrigensis Alexander, 1930
  - D. dyura Theischinger, 2000
  - D. fenwicki Alexander, 1923
  - D. ferox Alexander, 1928
  - D. flavomarginata (Riedel, 1914)
  - D. fuscipes Bergroth, 1889
  - D. gaba Theischinger, 2000
  - D. geometrica Theischinger, 1993
  - D. graeca Mannheims, 1954
  - D. hirsuticauda Savchenko, 1968
  - D. hispanica Mannheims, 1951
  - D. honshiuensis Alexander, 1938
  - D. howesi Alexander, 1922
  - D. illingworthi Alexander, 1930
  - D. issikiella Alexander, 1934
  - D. katoi Alexander, 1938
  - D. kongoola Theischinger, 1993
  - D. kurandensis Alexander, 1937
  - D. leonardi Theischinger, 1993
  - D. longifurca Skuse, 1890
  - D. minnamurra Theischinger, 1993
  - D. mongas Alexander, 1971
  - D. monticola Skuse, 1890
  - D. nephalia Alexander, 1948
  - D. nigrina Dobrotworsky, 1974
  - D. nitida Mik, 1874
  - D. niveitarsis Skuse, 1890
  - D. nokensis Alexander, 1948
  - D. oresitropha Alexander, 1928
  - D. palliditarsis Alexander, 1928
  - D. pallidula Alexander, 1928
  - D. parvicauda Edwards, 1923
  - D. percuneata Alexander, 1936
  - D. planidigitalis Skuse, 1890
  - D. pygmaea Alexander, 1928
  - D. queenslandica Alexander, 1920
  - D. schahriari Theowald, 1978
  - D. segnis Alexander, 1937
  - D. setistyla Alexander, 1971
  - D. spetai Theischinger, 1993
  - D. subannulipes Alexander, 1934
  - D. subposticata Alexander, 1928
  - D. tayloriana Alexander, 1936
  - D. thiasus Alexander, 1971
  - D. thowla Theischinger, 1993
  - D. thysbe Alexander, 1948
  - D. tropica Theischinger, 1993
  - D. tyilye Theischinger, 1993
  - D. umbacki Theischinger, 2000
  - D. varipes Skuse, 1890
  - D. victoriae Alexander, 1928
  - D. wuda Theischinger, 2000
  - D. yourula Theischinger, 1993
  - D. zborowskii Theischinger, 1999
  - D. zenta Theischinger, 1993
- Subgenus Eudolichopeza Alexander, 1956
  - D. lipophleps Alexander, 1956
- Subgenus Eunesopeza Alexander, 1934
  - D. defecta Edwards, 1933
  - D. epiphragmoides Edwards, 1933
- Subgenus Megistomastix Alexander, 1912
  - D. acutiloba Alexander, 1937
  - D. borinquenia Alexander, 1969
  - D. cubensis (Alexander, 1928)
  - D. darlingtoni Alexander, 1939
  - D. devexa Alexander, 1937
  - D. domingensis Alexander, 1939
  - D. jenaro Alexander, 1969
  - D. multifila Alexander, 1969
  - D. obtusiloba Alexander, 1937
  - D. polytricha Alexander, 1969
  - D. portoricensis (Alexander, 1912)
  - D. prattiana Alexander, 1969
  - D. vittinervis Alexander, 1937
- Subgenus Mitopeza Edwards, 1916
  - D. amisca Alexander, 1962
  - D. corinna Alexander, 1950
  - D. crassistyla Alexander, 1967
  - D. cuneiformis Edwards, 1932
  - D. flavicans (Edwards, 1927)
  - D. kanagaraji Alexander, 1952
  - D. longicornis (Brunetti, 1918)
  - D. mjobergi (Edwards, 1926)
  - D. nigromaculata (Edwards, 1928)
  - D. nitidirostris (Edwards, 1916)
  - D. rizalensis Alexander, 1931
  - D. taiwanicola Alexander, 1934
  - D. trichochora Alexander, 1974
- Subgenus Nesopeza Alexander, 1914
  - D. abdita Alexander, 1932
  - D. adela Alexander, 1949
  - D. albitibia (Alexander, 1922)
  - D. angustaxillaris (Alexander, 1930)
  - D. angustissima Alexander, 1960
  - D. annulitarsis (Alexander, 1930)
  - D. aphotisma Alexander, 1963
  - D. aquila Alexander, 1963
  - D. asura Alexander, 1968
  - D. bagobo Alexander, 1931
  - D. ballator Alexander, 1962
  - D. basistylata (Alexander, 1929)
  - D. bicornigera Alexander, 1932
  - D. borneensis (Edwards, 1926)
  - D. caloptera (Edwards, 1931)
  - D. capitella Alexander, 1968
  - D. capnora (Alexander, 1927)
  - D. cinctitarsis (Alexander, 1927)
  - D. circe (Alexander, 1928)
  - D. circulans Alexander, 1953
  - D. compressior Alexander, 1952
  - D. costalis Brunetti, 1918
  - D. creon Alexander, 1970
  - D. cuneata Edwards, 1926
  - D. dactylophora Alexander, 1968
  - D. dira Alexander, 1937
  - D. euthystyla Alexander, 1968
  - D. evanida Alexander, 1932
  - D. extrudens Alexander, 1963
  - D. fabella Alexander, 1937
  - D. francki Alexander, 1932
  - D. fulvithorax Edwards, 1928
  - D. fumidapex Alexander, 1950
  - D. garuda Alexander, 1967
  - D. geniculata (Alexander, 1918)
  - D. gracilis de Meijere, 1911
  - D. guttulanalis Alexander, 1958
  - D. haightensis Alexander, 1931
  - D. himalayae Alexander, 1952
  - D. imitator Savchenko, 1979
  - D. incisuralis Alexander, 1940
  - D. infumata Edwards, 1933
  - D. infuscata Brunetti, 1912
  - D. inornatipes Alexander, 1932
  - D. insolida Alexander, 1934
  - D. jobiensis Alexander, 1948
  - D. kashongensis Alexander, 1967
  - D. kraussiana Alexander, 1971
  - D. kulingensis Alexander, 1937
  - D. laetipes Alexander, 1952
  - D. leucocnemis Alexander, 1940
  - D. linearis Edwards, 1932
  - D. lohfauensis Alexander, 1949
  - D. longisetosa Alexander, 1959
  - D. ludibunda Alexander, 1932
  - D. lugubrivestis Alexander, 1935
  - D. magnisternata Alexander, 1949
  - D. major (Edwards, 1926)
  - D. manipurensis Alexander, 1967
  - D. melanorhipis Alexander, 1970
  - D. melanosterna Alexander, 1931
  - D. microdonta Alexander, 1968
  - D. microphallus Alexander, 1963
  - D. multiguttula Alexander, 1931
  - D. nebulicola Alexander, 1934
  - D. neoballator Alexander, 1967
  - D. nigrofemorata Alexander, 1931
  - D. noctipennis Alexander, 1956
  - D. oberon (Alexander, 1930)
  - D. orchestes Alexander, 1963
  - D. orientalis Brunetti, 1912
  - D. palifera Alexander, 1958
  - D. pallidithorax de Meijere, 1914
  - D. parjanya Alexander, 1968
  - D. parvella Alexander, 1931
  - D. parvicornis (Alexander, 1927)
  - D. paucispinosa Alexander, 1931
  - D. pedicillata Alexander, 1968
  - D. penthema Alexander, 1963
  - D. perdita Alexander, 1932
  - D. perlongiseta Alexander, 1967
  - D. perpulchra (Edwards, 1926)
  - D. polysara Alexander, 1970
  - D. praesul Alexander, 1962
  - D. praesultator Alexander, 1948
  - D. productula Alexander, 1931
  - D. profundemarginata Alexander, 1935
  - D. pudibunda Alexander, 1932
  - D. quadrifila Alexander, 1931
  - D. queribunda Alexander, 1932
  - D. rahula Alexander, 1967
  - D. rantaizana (Alexander, 1929)
  - D. ridibunda Alexander, 1932
  - D. sandakanensis Edwards, 1931
  - D. schmidi Alexander, 1968
  - D. scotoptera Alexander, 1963
  - D. seticristata Alexander, 1969
  - D. setilobata Alexander, 1968
  - D. setisternata Alexander, 1931
  - D. simplex Alexander, 1967
  - D. simplicissima Alexander, 1968
  - D. singhalica Alexander, 1958
  - D. spinisternata Alexander, 1931
  - D. subalbitibia Alexander, 1956
  - D. subballator Alexander, 1967
  - D. subcuneata Alexander, 1934
  - D. subgeniculata Alexander, 1931
  - D. taiwania (Alexander, 1923)
  - D. tarsalba Alexander, 1930
  - D. tarsalis (Alexander, 1919)
  - D. thiasophila Alexander, 1963
  - D. thisbe Alexander, 1938
  - D. tinkhamiana Alexander, 1942
  - D. titania (Alexander, 1927)
  - D. toala Alexander, 1935
  - D. toraja Alexander, 1935
  - D. trichopyga (Alexander, 1928)
  - D. triguttata Edwards, 1933
  - D. tuberculifera Alexander, 1956
  - D. vitrea Edwards, 1932
  - D. vitripennis Alexander, 1956
  - D. volupta Alexander, 1963
  - D. vyasa Alexander, 1970
- Subgenus Oropeza Needham, 1908
  - D. albitarsis (Brunetti, 1918)
  - D. australis Byers, 1961
  - D. barbigera (Savchenko, 1980)
  - D. bispinula (Alexander, 1929)
  - D. candidipes (Alexander, 1921)
  - D. carolus Alexander, 1940
  - D. dorsalis (Johnson, 1909)
  - D. fokiensis Alexander, 1938
  - D. inomatai Alexander, 1933
  - D. johnsonella (Alexander, 1931)
  - D. modesta (Savchenko, 1980)
  - D. obscura (Johnson, 1909)
  - D. polita (Johnson, 1909)
  - D. saitamensis Alexander, 1930
  - D. satsuma (Alexander, 1918)
  - D. sauteri (Riedel, 1917)
  - D. sayi (Johnson, 1909)
  - D. shirakiella (Alexander, 1926)
  - D. similis (Johnson, 1909)
  - D. subalbipes (Johnson, 1909)
  - D. subvenosa Alexander, 1940
  - D. tridenticulata Alexander, 1931
  - D. variitibiata Alexander, 1967
  - D. venosa (Johnson, 1909)
  - D. walleyi (Alexander, 1931)
- Subgenus Prodolichopeza Alexander, 1963
  - D. ata Alexander, 1931
  - D. bilan Alexander, 1931
  - D. isolata Alexander, 1930
  - D. malagasya Karsch, 1886
- Subgenus Sinoropeza Alexander, 1935
  - D. apicalis Liu & Yang, 2011
  - D. cuspidigera Liu & Yang, 2011
  - D. fasciventris Alexander, 1973
  - D. furcellatusa Liu & Yang, 2011
  - D. hamulifera Liu & Yang, 2011
  - D. multiseta Alexander, 1949
  - D. paucisetosa Alexander, 1937
  - D. pluricoma Alexander, 1935
  - D. postica Brunetti, 1912
- Subgenus Trichodolichopeza Alexander, 1917
  - D. albogeniculata Alexander, 1921
  - D. altiarca Alexander, 1956
  - D. aurantiaca Alexander, 1921
  - D. barnardi Wood, 1952
  - D. byersiana Alexander, 1964
  - D. cathedralis Alexander, 1956
  - D. centrosoma Alexander, 1956
  - D. chaka Alexander, 1956
  - D. dingaan Alexander, 1960
  - D. dorsoprojecta Alexander, 1956
  - D. flavifrons Alexander, 1925
  - D. fluminis Wood, 1952
  - D. hirtipennis Alexander, 1917
  - D. insincera Alexander, 1946
  - D. nimbicosta Alexander, 1965
  - D. panda Alexander, 1958
  - D. parvistyla Alexander, 1956
  - D. peringueyi Alexander, 1925
  - D. picticeps Alexander, 1925
  - D. pyramidata Alexander, 1956
  - D. semiophora Alexander, 1960
  - D. senzangakona Alexander, 1960
  - D. sparsihirta Alexander, 1943
  - D. thoracica Alexander, 1925
  - D. vumbicola Alexander, 1946
