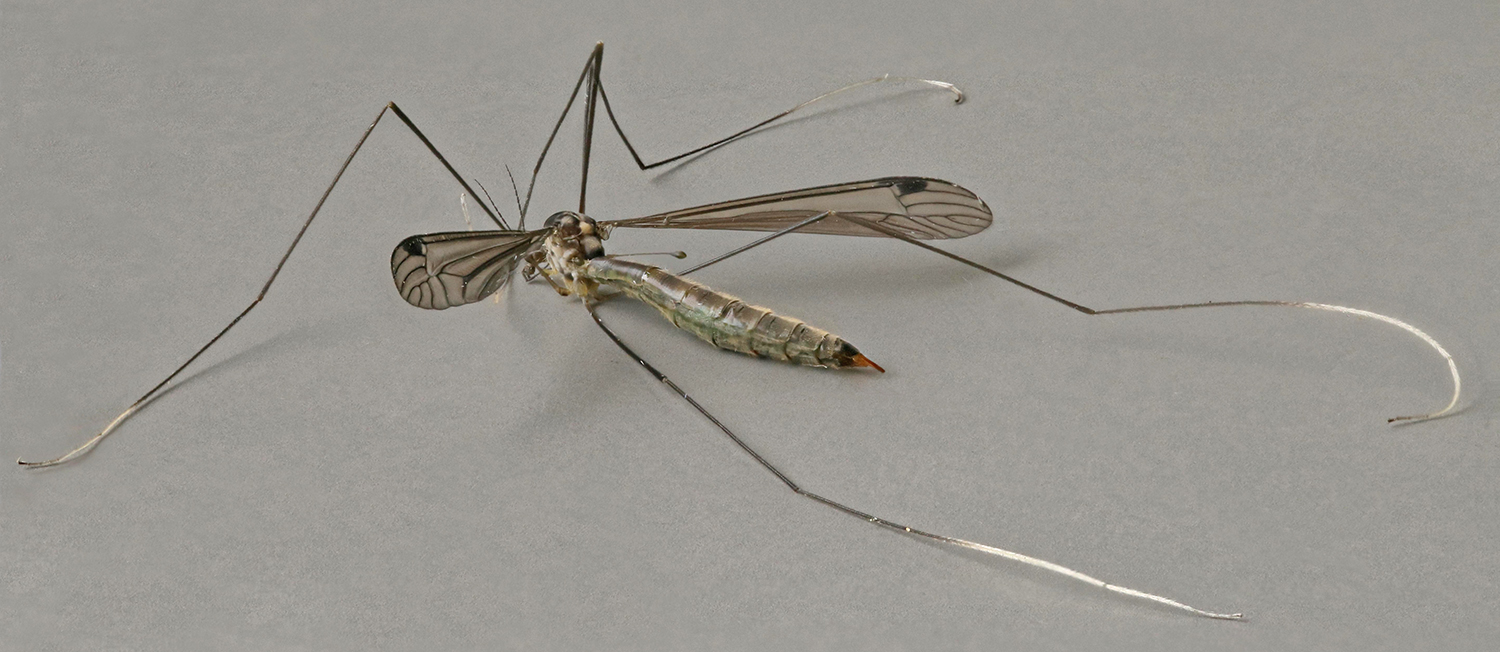
- Dolichopeza albipes North Wales

Scientific classification
- Kingdom: Animalia
- Phylum: Arthropoda
- Clade: Pancrustacea
- Class: Insecta
- Order: Diptera
- Family: Tipulidae
- Genus: Dolichopeza
- Species: D. albipes

Binomial name
- Dolichopeza albipes (Strom, 1768)

= Dolichopeza albipes =

Species of fly

Dolichopeza albipes, otherwise known as the white-footed ghost is a species of fly in the family Tipulidae. It is found in the Palearctic.
