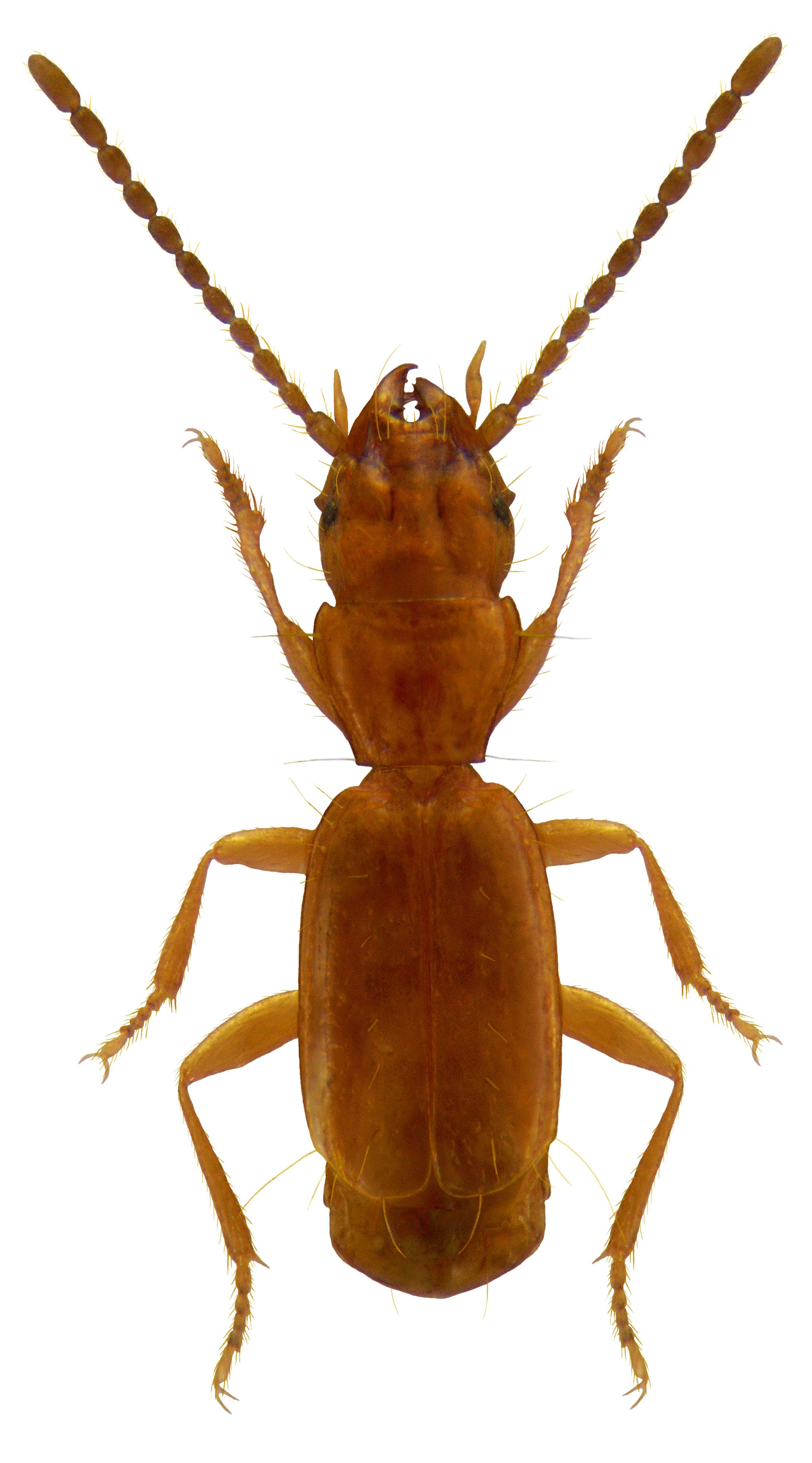
- Aepus marinus

Scientific classification
- Domain: Eukaryota
- Kingdom: Animalia
- Phylum: Arthropoda
- Class: Insecta
- Order: Coleoptera
- Suborder: Adephaga
- Family: Carabidae
- Subfamily: Trechinae
- Genus: Aepus; Leach, 1819

= Aepus =

Genus of beetles

Aepus is a genus of ground beetles of the subfamily Trechinae. Distributed in France, on Canary Islands and the archipelago Madeira in Spain, Albania, UK, Ireland, Norway and Sweden.

Representatives of this genus are characterized by the following features:

- Adults are less than 2.5 mm;
- Eyes are rudimentary;
- Elytron have a few erect hairs.

== Species of the genus ==
Aepus contains the following species:

- Aepus gallaecus Jeannel, 1926
- Aepus gracilicornis Wallaston, 1860
- Aepus marinus (Strom, 1783)
