= Peter Daniel Baade =

Norwegian priest and jurist (1737–1823)

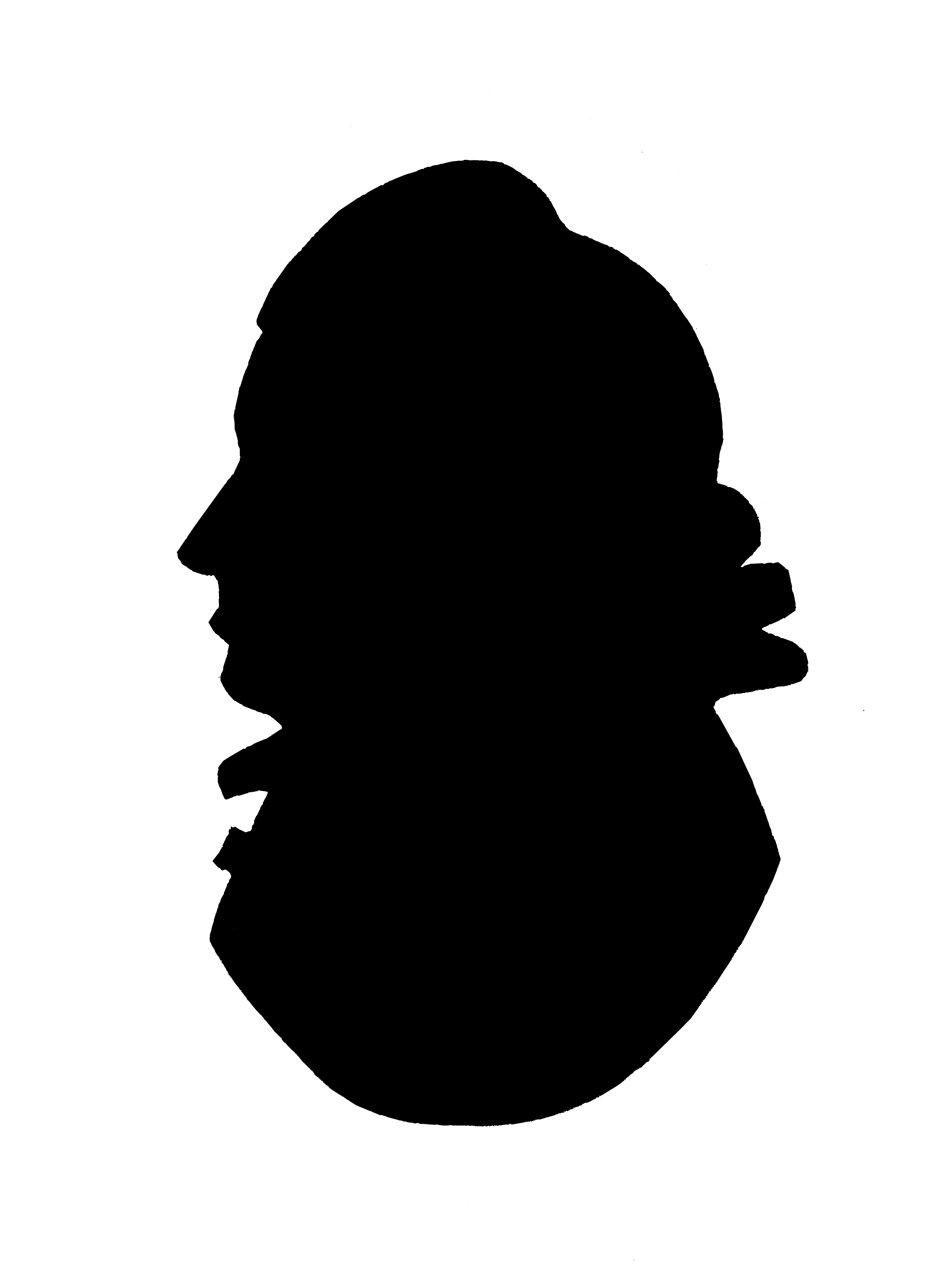

Peter Daniel Baade (March 8, 1737 – October 25, 1823), also known as Peter Daniel Både, was a Norwegian theologian and jurist. In 1768, he became the first librarian at the Royal Norwegian Society of Sciences and Letters.

== Background ==
Peter Daniel Baade was the son of Daniel Baade and Helle Marie Petersdatter Lange. He was born in Trondheim. He graduated from Trondheim Cathedral School in 1755 and received a candidate of theology degree two years later. In 1762, he went to Copenhagen, where he continued his studies and received a candidate of law degree in 1764. In 1773 he married Karen Friis Spliid (1745–1813), a pastor's daughter from Copenhagen.

== Professional life ==
After graduation, he returned to Trondheim, where he was an assistant to Bishop Johan Ernst Gunnerus. He joined the efforts to reorganize the Society of Sciences and Letters, he also made the first draft of its new statutes. In December 1767 he was named the society's first librarian, but in January 1768 he was appointed as a pastor in Lidemark and Bjæverskov. In 1784 Baade became a vicar at Borgund Church, and a few years later he became dean of Sunnmøre. He retired in 1816 due to the debility of old age.

He was a member of the election board for the district of Romsdal in the selection of delegates to the Norwegian Constituent Assembly in 1814. Baade himself was chosen as a representative for Eidsvoll, but he declined the position due to his advanced age and the election board had to find another.

Baade was a skilled and highly regarded cleric of the Enlightenment, with a mildly Orthodox orientation and an enthusiasm for culture. He maintained the school in good condition. Baade owned land in the district, had a knowledge of botany and was a pioneer in farming and gardening. For many years he was the chairman of Sunnmøre Practical Agricultural Society (Syndmøre practiske Landhuusholdningsselskab).

Bishop Johan Nordahl Brun considered him the ablest provost in the diocese, and he was nominated by Brun for the Order of the Dannebrog (awarded in 1811). In 1819 he became a member of the Order of the Polar Star. During a visitation, Brun noted that Baade, a friend of his since youth, was probably drunk, writing that Baade "did not speak very sensibly—I do not know if it was due to the impending dog day heat or the gifts of Bacchus." A few days later, Brun described Baade's sermon: "Baade expounded on 2 Corinthians 5:15 with exceptional depth and dogmatism. Today I have certainly heard the best speech since leaving Bergen, very brief but powerful."
