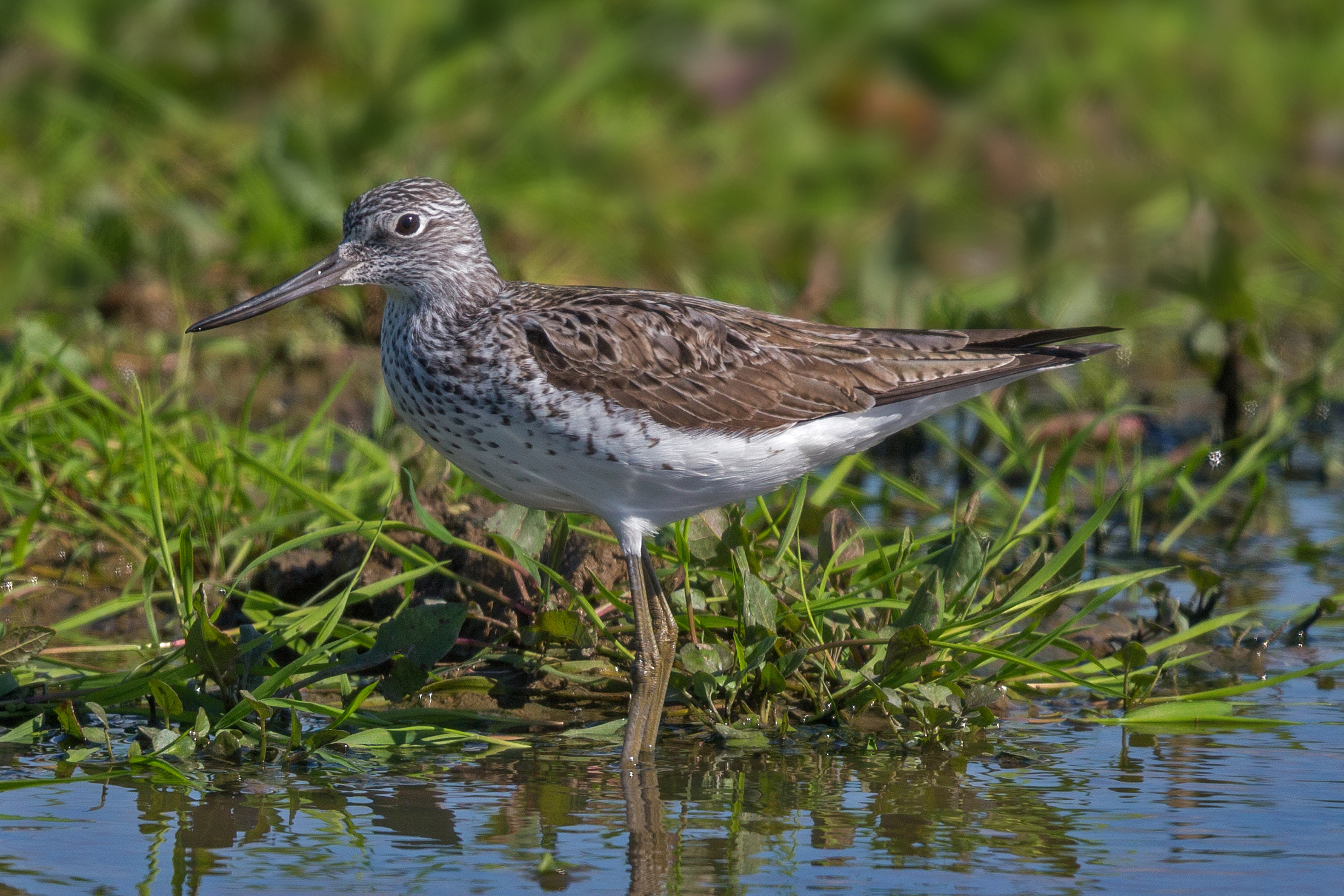
- Summer plumage, Schleswig-Holstein
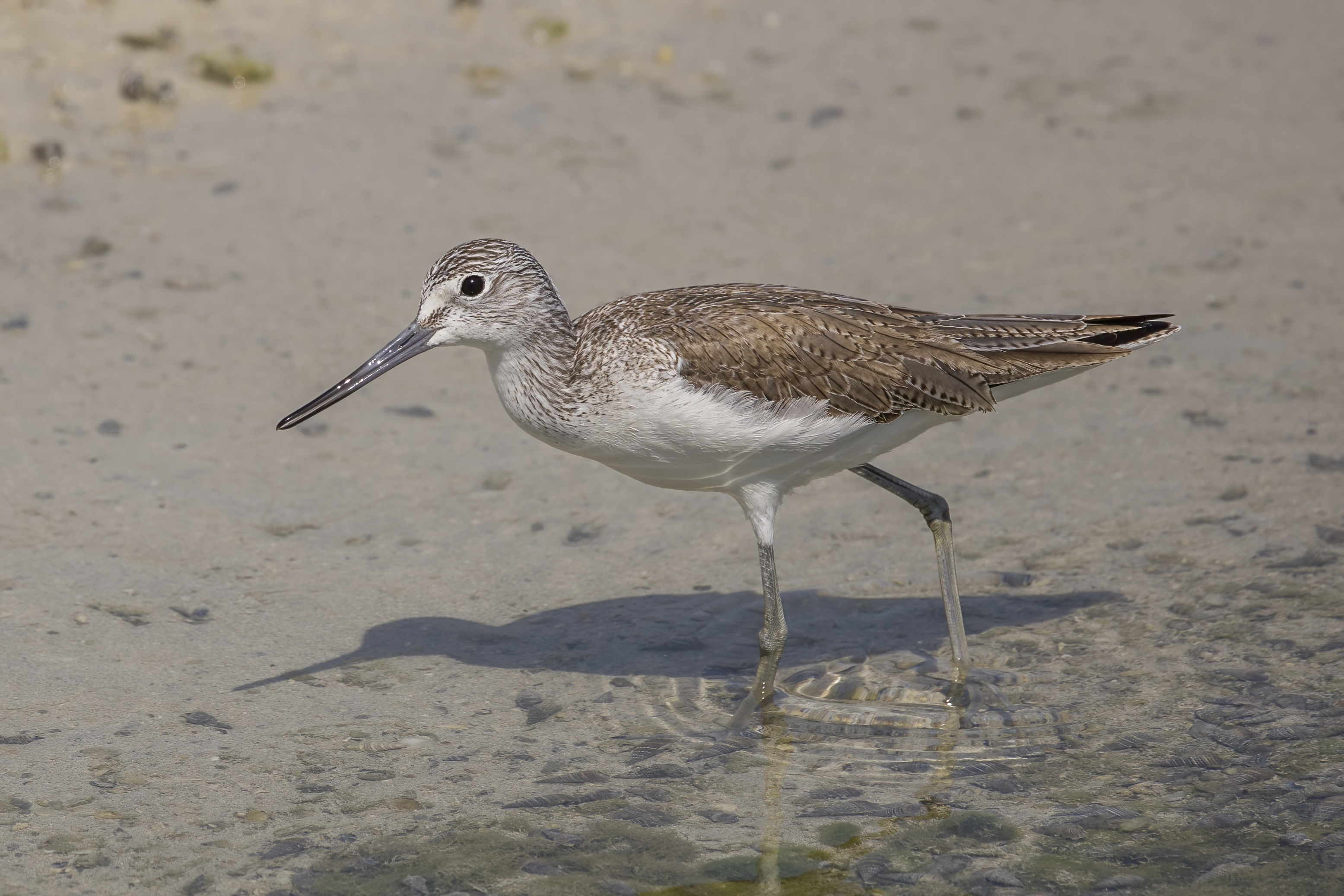
- Winter plumage, Bahrain Song and calls, recorded in west Sutherland, Scotland

Conservation status
- Least Concern (IUCN 3.1)

Scientific classification
- Kingdom: Animalia
- Phylum: Chordata
- Class: Aves
- Order: Charadriiformes
- Family: Scolopacidae
- Genus: Tringa
- Species: T. nebularia

Binomial name
- Tringa nebularia (Gunnerus, 1767)
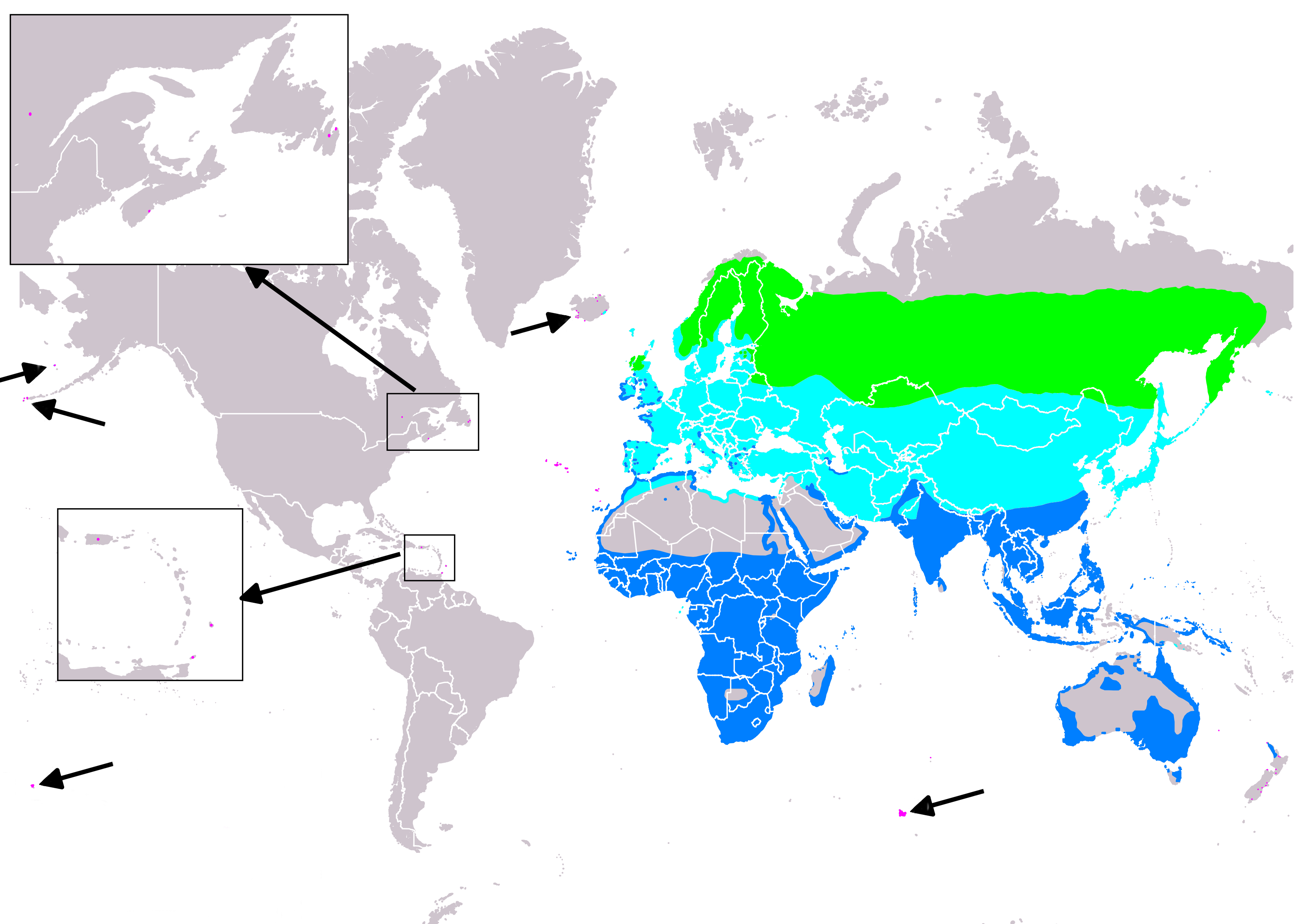
- Range of T. nebularia Breeding Non-breeding Passage Vagrant (seasonality uncertain)

Synonyms
- Scolopax glottis Linnaeus, 1758; Tringa littorea Linnaeus, 1758

= Common greenshank =

Species of bird

The common greenshank (Tringa nebularia) is a wader in the large family Scolopacidae, the typical waders. The genus name Tringa is the Neo-Latin name given to the green sandpiper by Aldrovandus in 1599 based on Ancient Greek trungas, a thrush-sized, white-rumped, tail-bobbing wading bird mentioned by Aristotle. The specific nebularia is from Latin nebula "mist". Like the Norwegian Skoddefoll, this refers to the greenshank's damp marshy habitat.

== Relatives ==
Its closest relative is the greater yellowlegs, which together with the spotted redshank form a close-knit group. Among them, these three species show all the basic leg and foot colours found in the shanks, demonstrating that this character is paraphyletic. They are also the largest shanks apart from the willet, which is altogether more robustly built. The greater yellowlegs and the common greenshank share a coarse, dark, and fairly crisp breast pattern as well as much black on the shoulders and back in breeding plumage.

== Distribution ==
This is a subarctic bird, breeding from northern Scotland eastwards across northern Europe and east across the Palearctic. It is a migratory species, wintering in Africa, the Indian subcontinent, and Australasia, usually on fresh water. It breeds on dry ground near marshy areas, laying about four eggs in a ground scrape. The common greenshank has been sighted as a vagrant outside of its normal range, including in Barbados, the United States, Canada, Bermuda, Puerto Rico, and Brazil.

== Description ==
Common greenshanks are brown in breeding plumage, and grey-brown in winter. When in water, they can appear very similar to marsh sandpipers but are distinguished by the shape of the lower bill which gives it an upturned appearance to the bill. They have long greenish legs and a long bill with a grey base. They show a white wedge on the back in flight. They are somewhat larger than the related common redshank. The usual call is a rapid series of three short fluty notes syllabilized as teu-teu-teu.

Like most waders, they feed on small invertebrates, but will also take small fish and amphibians.

The common greenshank is one of the species to which the Agreement on the Conservation of African-Eurasian Migratory Waterbirds (AEWA) applies. In 2024, T. nebularia was listed as Endangered under the Australian EPBC Act.

== Gallery ==
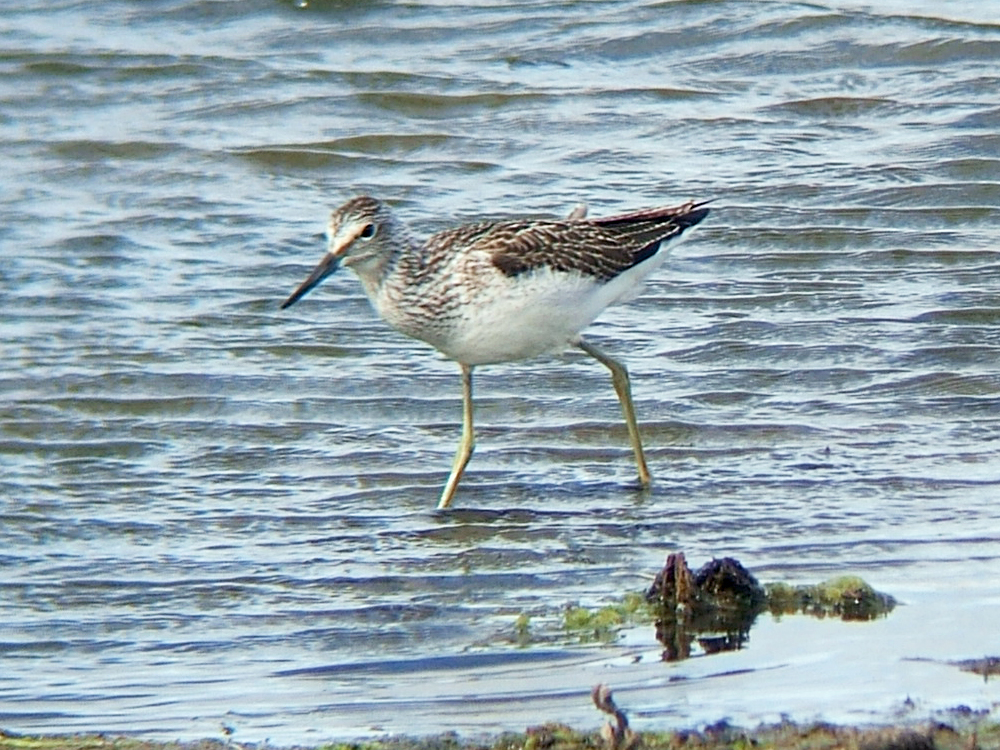
Juvenile

Manly Marina, SE Queensland, Australia

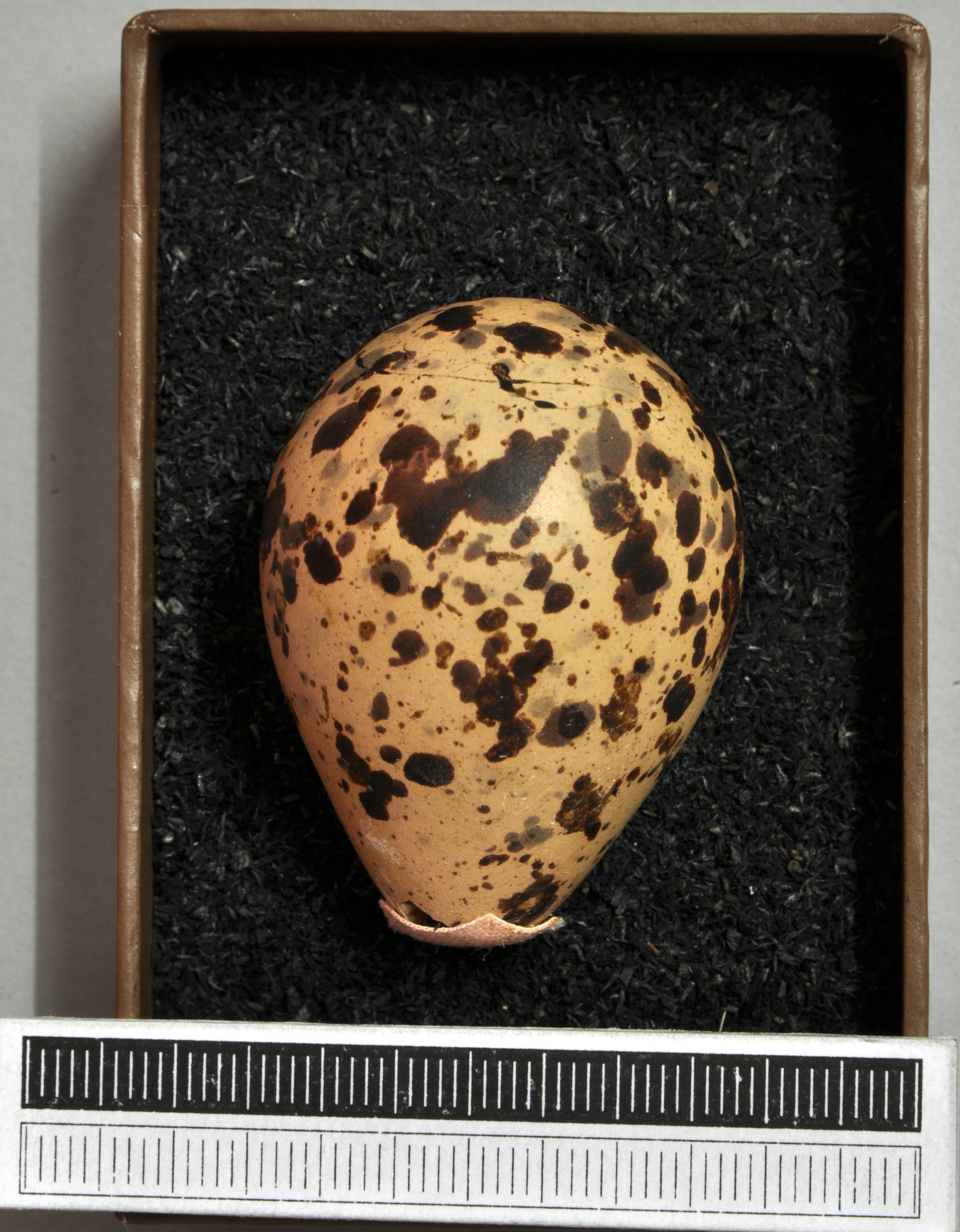
Egg, Collection Museum Wiesbaden

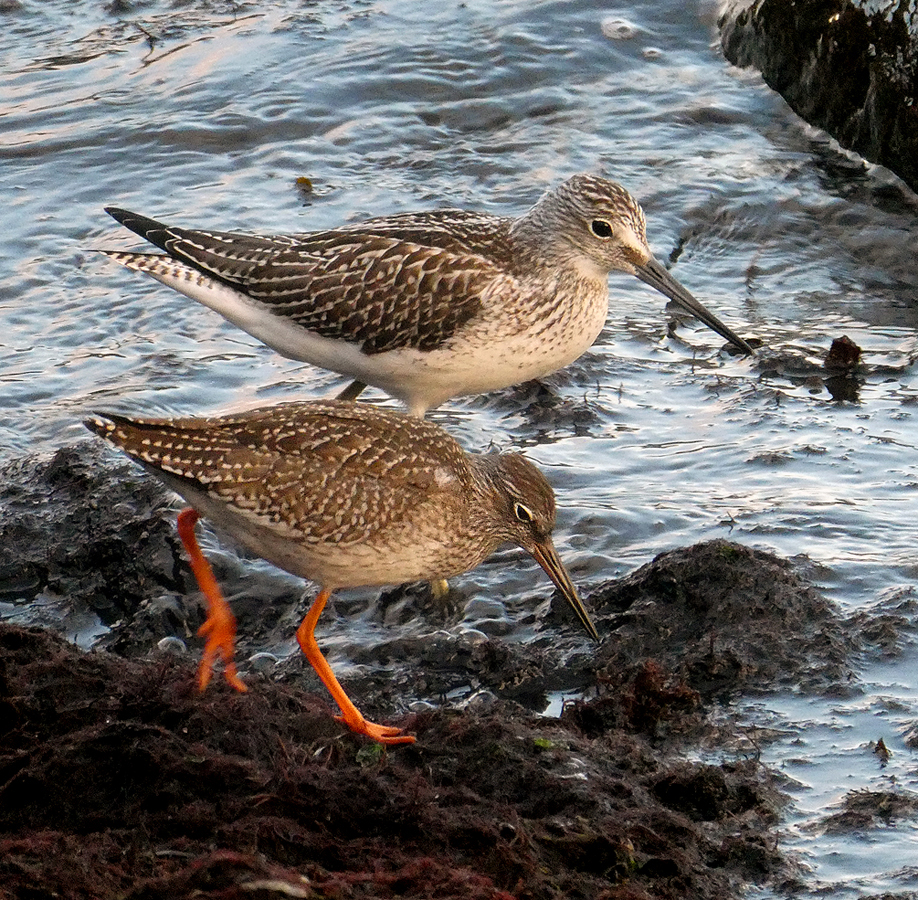
Common greenshanks are significantly larger than their close relative, the common redshank (Tringa totanus).

in Egypt
