= Dolichopeza walleyi =

Scientific classification
- Domain: Eukaryota
- Kingdom: Animalia
- Phylum: Arthropoda
- Class: Insecta
- Order: Diptera
- Family: Tipulidae
- Genus: Dolichopeza
- Species: D. walleyi

Binomial name
- Dolichopeza walleyi (Johnson, 1931)

Synonyms
- Dolichopeza dakota Alexander, 1944; Oropeza walleyi Alexander, 1931

Species of fly

Dolichopeza walleyi is a species of large crane fly in the family Tipulidae.
