= University Museum of Bergen =

Museum in Bergen, Norway

Coordinates: 60°23′15.44″N 5°19′17.69″E

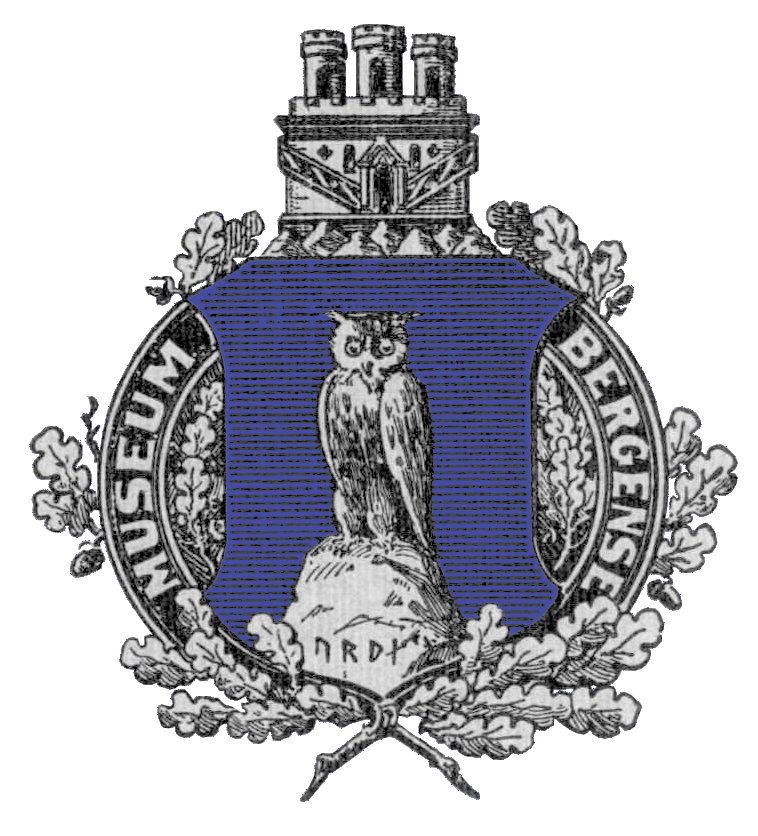
Coat of arms

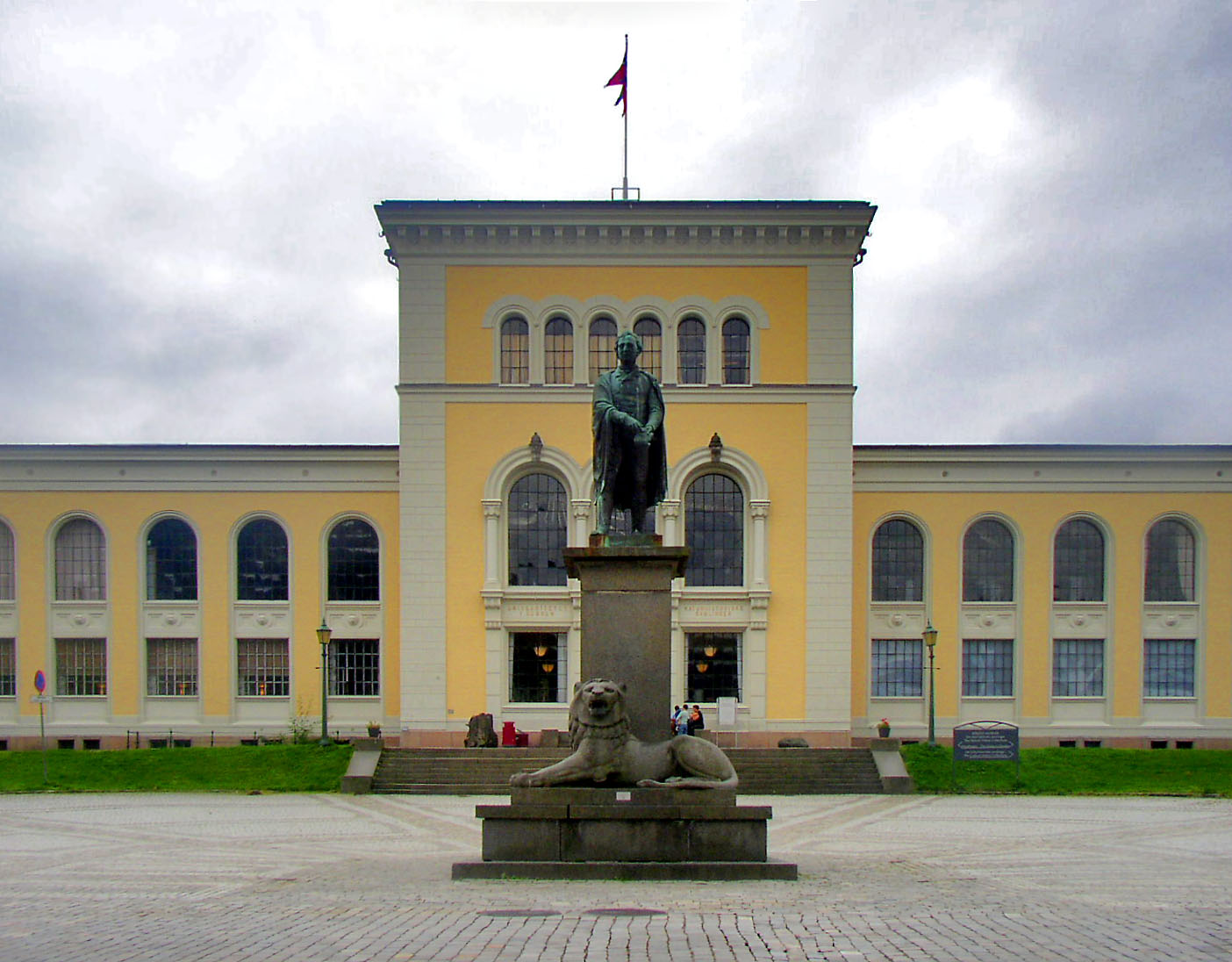
Museum plaza with the statue of Wilhelm Frimann Koren Christie, founder of the University Museum of Bergen

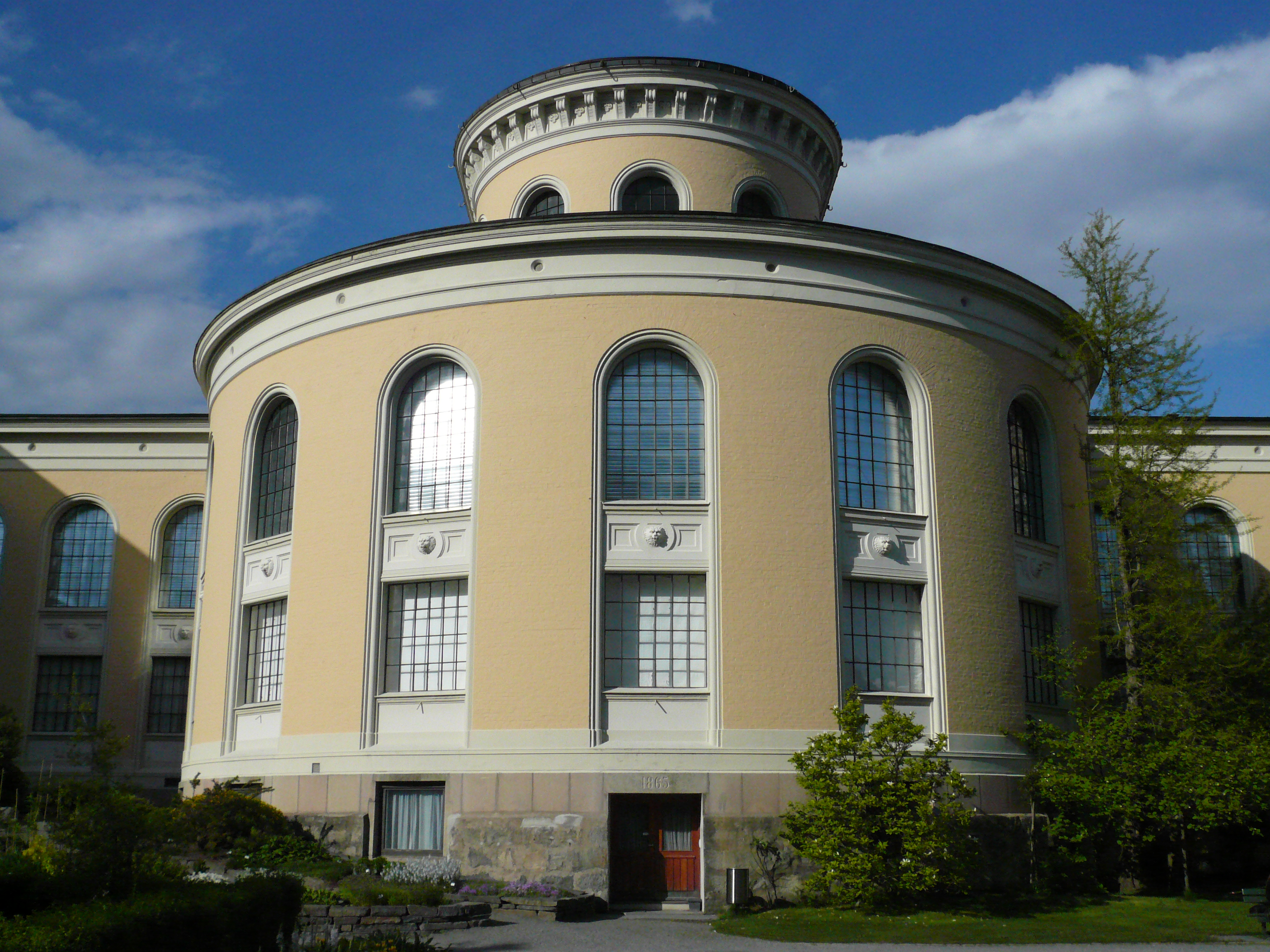
University Museum of Bergen

The University Museum of Bergen (Norwegian: Universitetsmuseet i Bergen) is a university museum in Bergen, Norway. The museum features material related to anthropology, archaeology, botany, geology, zoology, art, and cultural history.

== History ==
The University Museum of Bergen was founded in 1825 by Wilhelm Frimann Koren Christie, at the time president of the Storting. Founded under the name University Museum of Bergen with the intent of building large collections in the fields of culture and natural history, it became the grounds for most of the academic activity in the city, a tradition which has prevailed since the museum became part of the University of Bergen. The University Museum of Bergen is divided into two departments, the Natural History Collections and the Cultural History Collections and Public Outreach and exhibitions. It is also the caretaker of the museum garden, formerly the botanical garden, surrounding the natural history building, and the city's arboretum.

This was the first dedicated museum building in Norway. In its early years, the museum contained numerous art collections, including several works by the painter Johan Christian Dahl, cultural artefacts, and craftwork items. In 1831, the museum moved from its location in the Seminarium Fredericianum building near Bergen Cathedral School (Bergen katedralskole), to a new building southwest of Lille Lungegårdsvannet.

The current natural history building was designed by Johan Henrik Nebelong and finished in 1865. Bergen Museum moved in during 1866. The wings of the building were added in 1898 and the botanical garden was laid out between 1897 and 1899. The cultural history department got its own building in 1927. The increasing research activity at the museum from the late 19th century and onward led directly to the founding of the University of Bergen in 1946.
