= Gerhard Schøning =

Norwegian historian

Gerhard Schoning
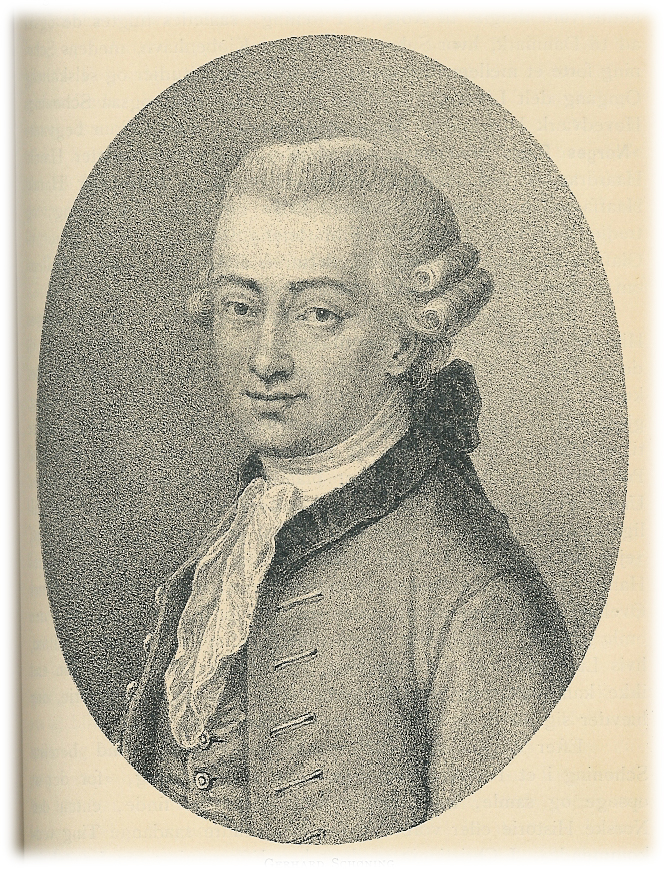
- Born: 2 May 1722; Lofoten, Norway; Denmark–Norway
- Died: 18 July 1780 (aged 58); Copenhagen, Denmark; Denmark–Norway

Gerhard Schøning (2 May 1722 – 18 July 1780) was a Norwegian historian. His Reise som giennem en Deel af Norge i de Aar 1773, 1774, 1775 paa Hans Majestets Kongens Bekostning documenting travel through Trondhjem, Gudbrandsdalen, and Hedemarken, Norway in 1773–1775 has been recognized as both a historical reference and as a "minor travel classic."

== Career ==
Gerhard Schøning was born on Skotnes farm in Buksnes Municipality in Lofoten, Norway. He was the son of merchant Andreas Schøning and Martha Ursin. His early education was provided by local ministers. He began his formal schooling in 1739 in Trondheim Cathedral School and in 1742 he began at the University of Copenhagen, passing the theology examination in 1744 and the magistrate examination in 1748.

In 1750, he was appointed rector at Trondheim Cathedral School as successor to Benjamin Dass. His first work Forsøg til de nordiske landes, særdeles Norges, gamle Geografi (Inquiry into the ancient geography of the Nordic countries, particularly that of Norway), was published in 1751. The same year he became rector of Trondheim Cathedral School. He traveled there together with the Danish historian Peter Frederik Suhm, with whom he continued to collaborate over the following years. Together they produced Forbedringer til den gamle danske og norske Historie (Improvements to the old Danish-Norwegian History) in 1757.

In 1758, Bishop Johan Ernst Gunnerus of Trondheim invited the two historians to collaborate with him in founding a Norwegian science society, the Royal Norwegian Society of Sciences and Letters. In 1765, Schøning was appointment as professor of rhetoric and history at the Sorø Academy. He published Om de gamle Grækeres og Romeres Kundskab om de nordiske Lande (About the Ancient Greek and Roman knowledge of the Nordic countries) in 1769, which became a prelude to his main work, Norges Riiges Historie (The History of the Kingdom of Norway), the first volume of three that were planned was published in 1771. This work dealt with Norway's history from the earliest times up until 995, advancing theories about early migrations into Norway.

As part of his research to support later volumes of this work, he set off on an extended journey to collect data in Norway. He received travel support from the King Christian VII of Denmark, and spent several years beginning in 1773 traveling in Trondheim, Gudbrandsdalen, Hedemarken, and Christiania. The result of these journeys was his famous travel journal Reise som giennem en Deel af Norge i de Aar 1773, 1774, 1775 paa Hans Majestets Kongens Bekostning (Travel through a part of Norway in the years of 1773, 1774, 1775 at His Majesty the King's Expense), of which only the first two volumes were published in 1778. His research journey was interrupted on 23 August 1775 when the king appointed him the head of the Royal Archives in Copenhagen. When he died in 1780, his work on an improved Norwegian history went uncompleted.

In 1756, Schøning married Fredrikke Hveding, who died in 1788; the marriage was childless. Later his death, a sizable portion of his personal book collection would be donated to the Gunnerus Library at the University of Trondheim.

== Published works ==
- Forsøg til de nordiske landes, særdeles Norges, gamle Geografi, 1751
- Forbedringer til den gamle danske og norske Historie, 1757
- Om de norskes og en Del andre nordiske Folks Oprindelse, 1769
- Om de gamle Grækeres og Romeres Kundskab om de nordiske Lande
- Norges Riiges Historie (The History of the Kingdom of Norway) — volume 1 of 3 planned was published in 1771
- Reise som giennem en Deel af Norge i de Aar 1773, 1774, 1775 paa Hans Majestets Kongens Bekostning (Travel through a part of Norway in the years of 1773, 1774, 1775 at His Majesty the King's Expense) — only the first two volumes were published in 1778.
