= Johan Ernst Gunnerus =

Norwegian bishop and botanist (1718–1773)

Right Reverend Johan Ernst Gunnerus
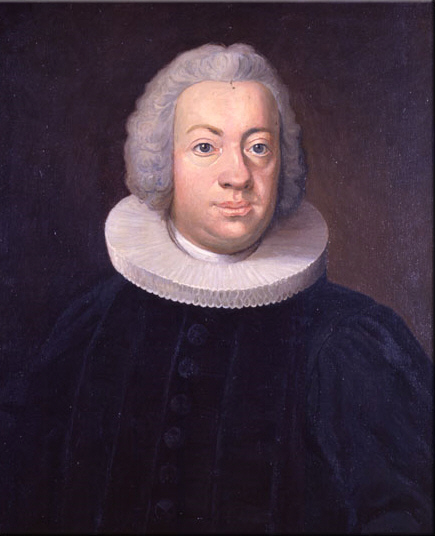
- Born: 26 February 1718; Christiania, Norway
- Died: 25 September 1773 (aged 55); Christiania, Norway
- Education: University of Copenhagen, University of Halle, University of Jena
- Known for: Flora Norvegica
- Title: Bishop
- Parent(s): Erasmus Gunnerus and Anna Gerhard
- Scientific career
- Fields: Bishop, botanist, zoologist
- Workplaces: Bishop of the Diocese of Nidaros, Trondheim; University of Copenhagen
- Author abbrev. (botany): Gunnerus
- Author abbrev. (zoology): Gunnerus

Johan Ernst Gunnerus (26 February 1718 – 25 September 1773) was a Norwegian bishop and botanist. Gunnerus was born at Christiania. He was bishop of the Diocese of Nidaros from 1758 until his death and also a professor of theology at the University of Copenhagen.

== Biography ==
Gunnerus was born and raised in Christiania in Norway. He enrolled at the University of Copenhagen in Denmark in 1737, but had to postpone his studies for three years because of poverty. He studied in Copenhagen from 1740, at Halle in Germany from 1742, and at Jena from 1744, where he received his Magister degree in 1745 and in 1753 was admitted to the Faculty of Philosophy. At Jena he published extensively, notably a work on natural and international law in eight volumes. In 1754 he was recalled to Denmark and appointed Professor and Rector at Herlufsholm. In 1758 he became Bishop of the Diocese of Nidaros in Trondheim, Norway.

Gunnerus was very interested in natural history and accumulated a large collection of specimens from visits to central and northern Norway. He also encouraged others to send him specimens. Together with the historians Gerhard Schöning and Peter Frederik Suhm he founded the Trondheim Society in 1760. In 1767 it received royal recognition and became the Royal Norwegian Society of Sciences and Letters.

Gunnerus was vice President and Director Perpetuus of the Society from 1767 to 1773. The society began publishing its journal in 1761, entitled Det Trondhiemske Selskabs Skrifter, still published today as Det Kongelige Norske Videnskabers Selskabs Skrifter. In 1765 Gunnerus published a description of a basking shark in this journal, giving it the scientific name Squalus maximius.

Gunnerus was the author of Flora Norvegica (1766–1776). He contributed notes on the ornithology of northern Norway to Knud Leem's Beskrivelse over Finmarkens Lapper (1767), translated into English in 1808 as An Account of the Laplanders of Finmark. In this Gunnerus was the first person to give a scientific name to the Greenshank. Gunnerus discussed a number of his findings with Carolus Linnæus, mainly known as Carl von Linné, with whom he was in correspondence. The original letters from Carolus Linnæus are held at the Royal Norwegian Society of Sciences and Letters in Trondheim, while the ones from Gunnerus to Linnæus are found at the Linnean Society of London.

Gunnerus was the first to suggest that since the northern lights were caused by the Sun, there also had to be auroras around the moon, Venus and Mercury.

In 1766, Gunnerus was elected a foreign member of the Royal Swedish Academy of Sciences.

== Legacy ==
The plant genus Gunnera was named after him, as well as the Gunnerus Library.

The Norwegian University of Science and Technology operates a research vessel, 'Gunnerus' named after him.

== See also ==
- Category:Taxa named by Johan Ernst Gunnerus

== Notes ==
Church of Norway titles
Preceded by Frederik Nannestad	Bishop of Trondhjem; 1758–1773	Succeeded by Marcus Fredrik Bang
