= Hans Strøm =

Norwegian clergyman (1726–1797)

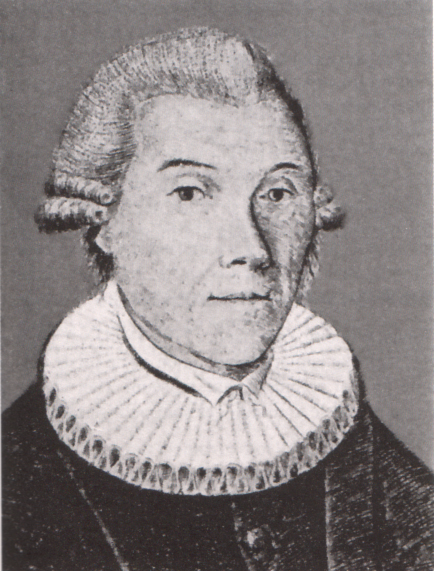
Hans Strøm

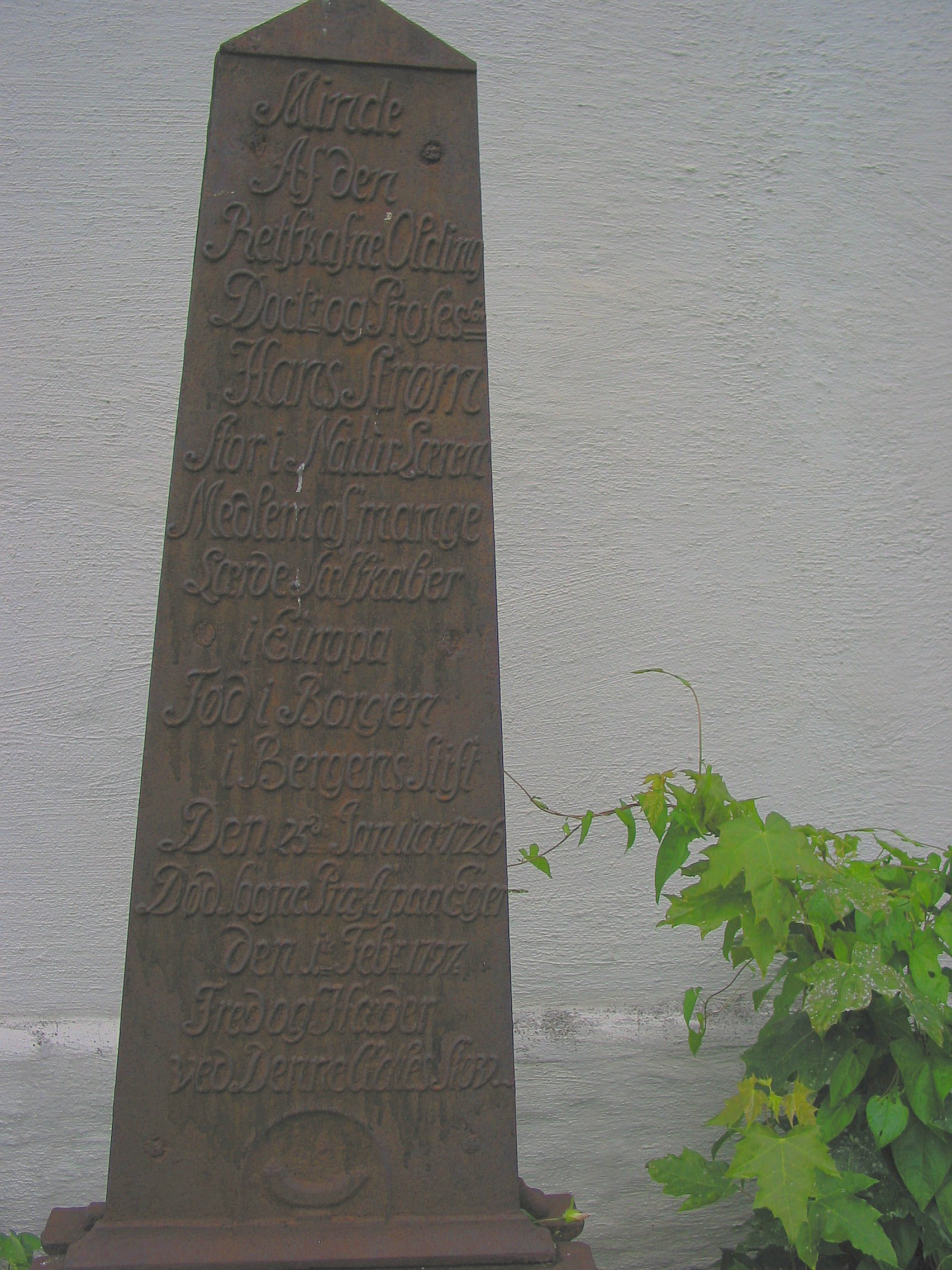
Memorial to Hans Strøm at Haug Church in Øvre Eiker, Norway

Hans Strøm (25 January 1726 – 1 February 1797) was a Norwegian clergyman. He also became a prominent zoologist and naturalist. He is best associated with his topographical description of the traditional district of Sunnmøre.

== Life ==
Hans Strøm was born in the prestegjeld (parish) of Borgund in Romsdalen county, Norway. His father was a clergyman and many other relatives of both his father and mother were ministers. He attended the Bergen Cathedral School. He was educated as a Lutheran clergyman and in 1745 took a theological degree at the University of Copenhagen. Then he worked from 1750 to 1764 as chaplain in Borgund Church. In 1764 he became parish priest, first at Volda Church where he served until 1779, when he went to Eiker where he served as Vicar for 18 years. He died at Hokksund (in what is now Øvre Eiker Municipality in Buskerud county).

== Topography ==
Strøm is particularly known as a topographer, and especially for the model physical and economic description he gave of Søndmør's bailiff's office (1762–69), also called Søndmør's Description. In this work he describes how the wave formation and lines of Sunnmøre's mountains were explained by the locals as a result of the Syndfloden's water masses. He himself considers it more probable that they are due to rain, but states that the farmers are absolutely right that the ridges are consistently parallel from northeast to southwest, and thus resemble the waves that the northwest wind creates at sea. He published a similar work on Eiker: Physisk-Oeconomisk Beskrivning over Eger-præstegield in 1784. In Sunnmøre's description, he gave an early account of the construction technique of the Sunnmøre stave churches. In Strøm's time, there were still about a hundred stave churches in Norway, but many had disappeared before the mapping and conservation work began in the 19th century.

== Zoological work ==
Hans Strøm was the first Norwegian who gave species descriptions for Norwegian animals. The results of his research was published as Physisk og Oeconomisk Beskrivelse over Fogderiet Søndmør I–II (Copenhagen, 1762–1766), a work that established his reputation as a scientific authority. He followed up this work with a number of articles, particularly where the natural sciences were strongly represented. He co-founded the Royal Norwegian Society of Sciences and Letters in 1760, with Gerhard Schoning, the historian, and Johan Ernst Gunnerus, bishop of the Diocese of Nidaros. In 1779, Strøm was elected a foreign member of the Royal Swedish Academy of Sciences. He was also elected as a member of a number of science academies in Norway, Denmark and Germany.

== Other sources ==
- Apelseth, Arne (1995) Hans Strøm (1726-1797): ein kommentert bibliografi (Volda: Høgskulen i Volda) ISBN 82-7661-025-0
