= Svøufallet =

- Location: Møre og Romsdal, Norway
- Coordinates: 62.510396°N 9.058101°E
- Type: Tiered
- Total height: 246 m (807 ft)
- Number of drops: 9
- Longest drop: 167 m (548 ft)
- Average width: 18 m (59 ft)
- Watercourse: Grødøla
- Average flow rate: 3 m^{3}/s (110 cu ft/s)

Svøufallet is a waterfall in Sunndal Municipality, in Møre og Romsdal county, Norway. The 246-metre (807 ft) tall waterfall is located in the Jenstadjuvet gorge, along the river Grødøla, which is a tributary of the larger river Driva. The waterfall is located about 5 kilometres (3.1 mi) southwest of the village of Gjøra which sits roughly halfway between the villages of Sunndalsøra and Oppdal.

The waterfall begins slowly with several smaller drops before reaching the edge of the gorge where it drops 167 metres (548 ft) to the river below. The falls are an average of 18 metres (59 ft) wide. The river pushes an average of 3 cubic metres per second (110 cu ft/s) over the falls year-round, with the best flow occurring during the summer. The waterfall is located within the Åmotan-Grøvudalen Nature Reserve.

== See also ==
- List of waterfalls
