= Grøa =

Village in Sunndal Municipality, Norway

- Village
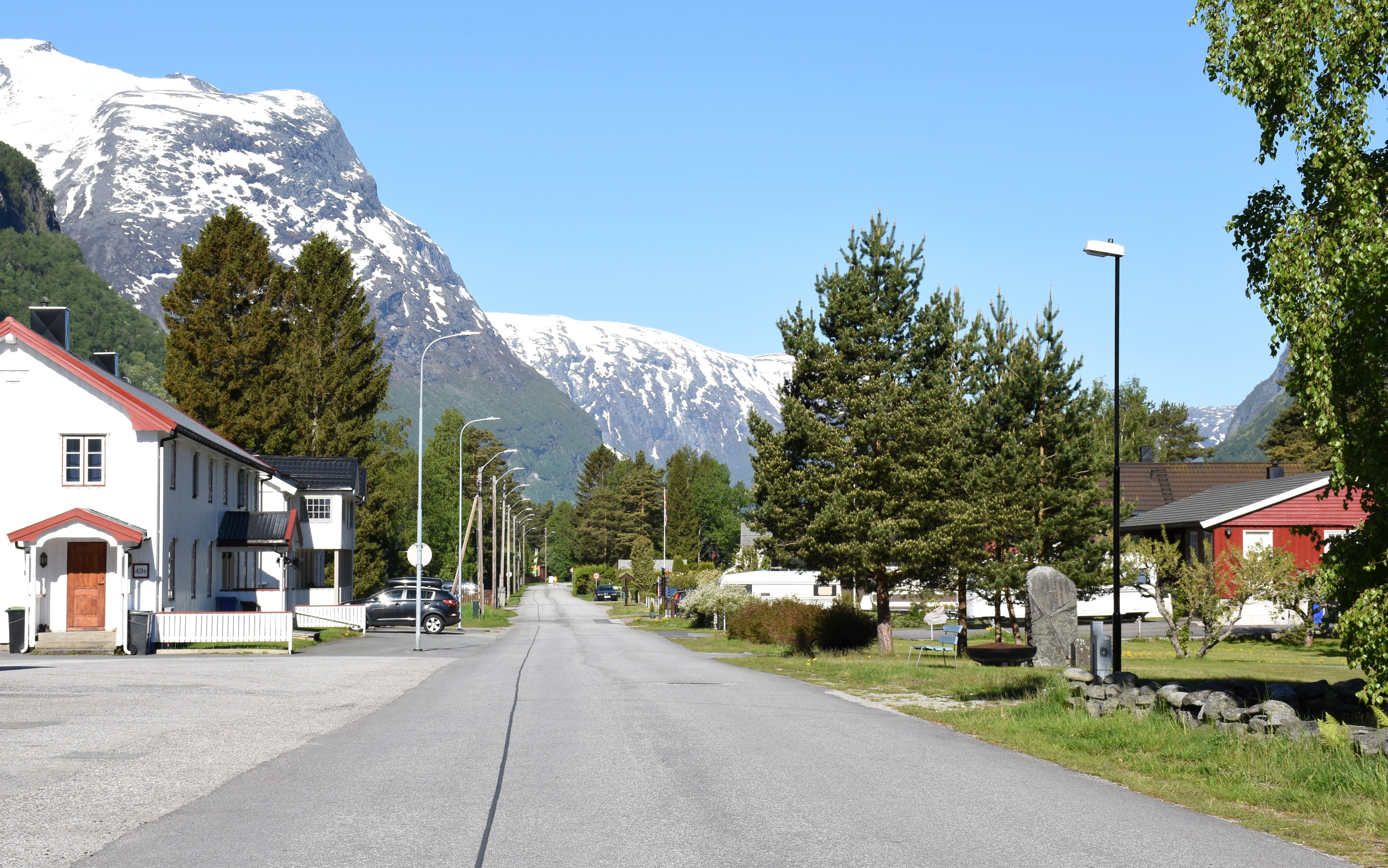
- Interactive map of Grøa
- Location within Møre og Romsdal Location within Norway
- Coordinates: 62.6438°N 8.7246°E
- Country: Norway
- Region: Western Norway
- County: Møre og Romsdal
- District: Nordmøre
- Municipality: Sunndal Municipality

Area
  - Total: 0.32 km^{2} (0.12 sq mi)
- Elevation: 45 m (148 ft)

Population (2024)
  - Total: 377
  - Density: 1,178/km^{2} (3,050/sq mi)
- Time zone: UTC+01:00 (CET)
  - Summer (DST): UTC+02:00 (CEST)
- Post Code: 6612 Grøa

Grøa is a village in Sunndal Municipality in Møre og Romsdal county, Norway. The village is located along the river Driva and along the Norwegian National Road 70, about 8.5 kilometres (5.3 mi) east of Sunndalsøra and about 5 kilometres (3.1 mi) east of Hoelsand. The Vinnufossen waterfall lies about 3 kilometres (1.9 mi) west of the village.

The 0.32-square-kilometre (79-acre) village has a population (2024) of 377 and a population density of 1,178 inhabitants per square kilometre (3,050/sq mi).
