= Trou de Fer =

Canyon on Reunion Island

Coordinates: 21°2′25″S 55°33′25″E

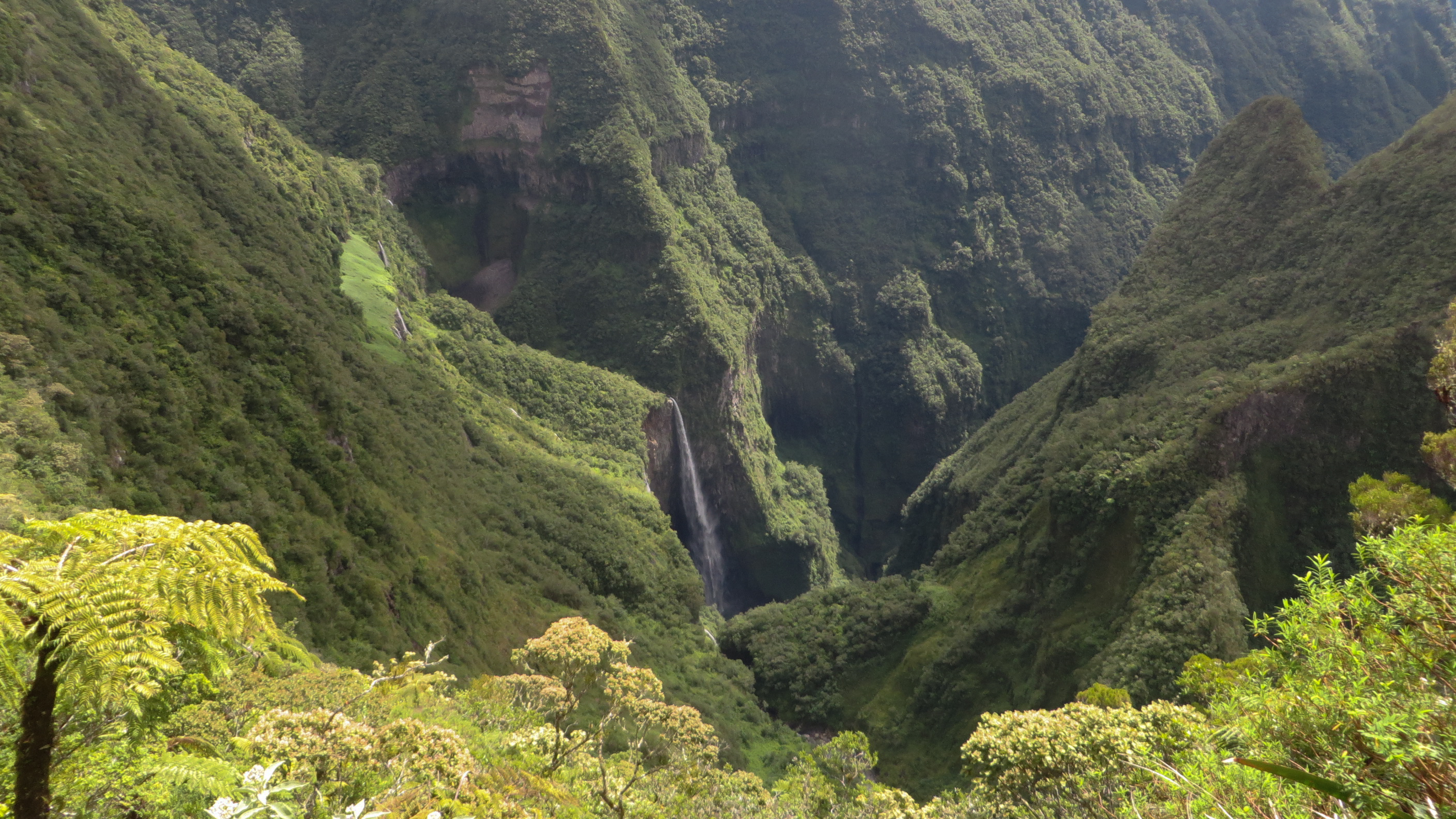
Waterfall into the Trou-de-Fer seen from viewpoint high above

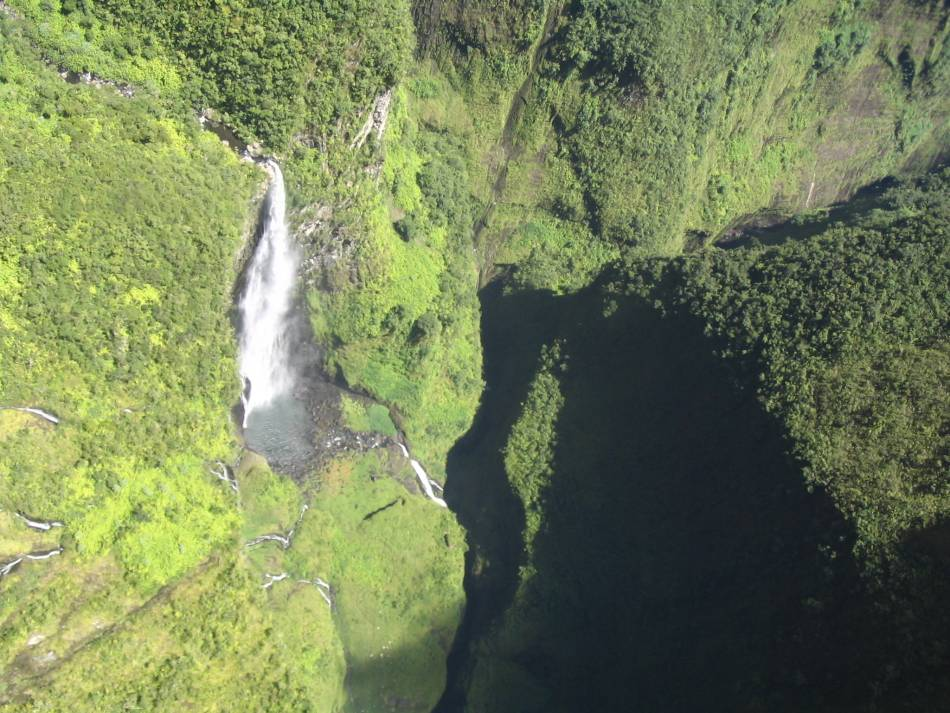
The main waterfall of the Bras de Caverne River in the Trou de Fer

The Trou de Fer ("Iron Hole") is a canyon on Reunion Island, off the coast of Madagascar in the Indian Ocean. The primary river flowing through the gorge, which is up to 300 m (1,000 ft) deep, is the Bras de Caverne River, a tributary of the Rivière du Mât. The canyon has two distinct parts: a large crater, which is fed by six prominent waterfalls, and a narrow slot canyon at its outlet, which constitutes most of the canyon's length. The canyon starts at the waterfall of the Bras Mazerine stream and after some 1.4 – 1.8 km from the left side joins the main Bras de Caverne stream. The Bras de Caverne River enters the canyon with a waterfall about 200 m (660 ft) high. This drop is usually dry or has very little water, but between that and the next, 180-metre (590 ft) drop, springs feed the river, which drops over this then drops over a final 300-metre (1,000 ft) undercut cliff into the Trou de Fer in a narrow plume of water.

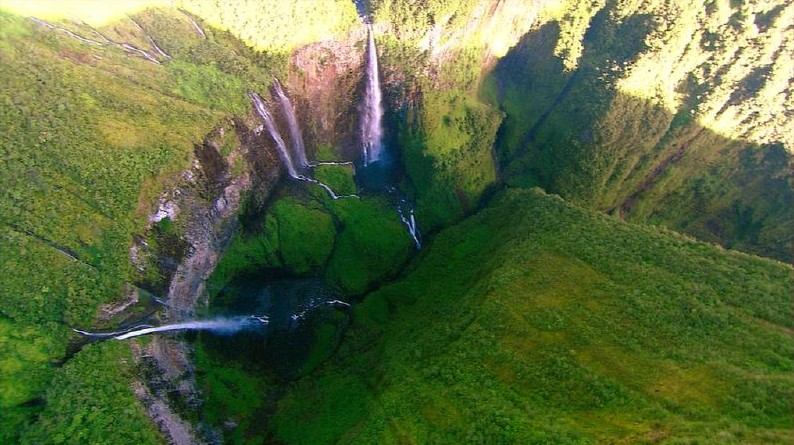
The Trou de Fer seen from above; the Bras de Caverne's waterfall is to the far right.

Directly to the left of this waterfall, another stream drops over the cliff, which is undercut to an extent that its lip has over 200 m (660 ft) of empty space between it and the canyon floor, of approximately the same height in two channels, and slams onto a ledge before emptying into the same pool as the Bras de Caverne waterfall. This waterfall is not as high, and has a smaller water flow. It is fed by several other falls streaming off the cliffs above it. Further to the left, at about twice the distance from the first falls to the second, another large stream plunges into the canyon. In total, there are at least six waterfalls feeding the canyon. At the base of the canyon, a separate slot canyon, or "The Narrows", begins. The water from the Bras de Caverne waterfall and the waterfall to its left drain into the slot canyon at a 90-degree angle, through a waterfall known informally as the "Washing Machine". The name stems from the mist it generates, which drenches people who stand near the base of the falls.

The slot canyon, or "The Corridor", extends for about 3 km (1.9 mi), and is said to be commonly dammed up by debris jams to form lakes, including the "Lake of the Eel". Many springs flow through the porous volcanic rock of the walls, creating countless waterfalls.

The team of Pascale Lapoule, Laurent Broisin and Pascal Colas were the first to climb/walk the canyon on 19–21 September 1989.

== See also ==
- List of waterfalls
- List of waterfalls by height
