= Cascade Blanche =

Waterfall on Réunion

- Interactive map of Cascade Blanche
- Location: Bras-Panon, Réunion
- Coordinates: 21°20′13″S 55°27′37″E
- Elevation: 839 m (2,753 ft)
- Total height: 640 m (2,100 ft)
- Number of drops: 3
- Watercourse: Ravine Blanche

The Cascade Blanche (or Cascade de Ravine Blanche) is a waterfall on the island of Réunion, overseas department French in the southwest Indian Ocean.

== Description ==
Formed by the Ravine Blanche, a tributary of the Rivière du Mât, the waterfall is located on the territory of the commune of Bras-Panon but is nevertheless often associated with Salazie, being especially visible from the Route de Salazie. It is also located in the Parc national de La Réunion.

Cascade Blanche has a height of 640 m (2,100 ft), making it one of the tallest waterfalls in the world and the third highest in France and the French territories. The waterfall is divided into three sections, the largest measuring 400 m (1,300 ft). It is possible to practice canyoneering in the waterfall.

== See also ==
- List of waterfalls
- List of waterfalls by height
