= Gjøra =

Village in Sunndal Municipality, Norway

- Village
- Interactive map of Gjøra
- Location within Møre og Romsdal Location within Norway
- Coordinates: 62.5488°N 9.1124°E
- Country: Norway
- Region: Western Norway
- County: Møre og Romsdal
- District: Nordmøre
- Municipality: Sunndal Municipality
- Elevation: 200 m (660 ft)
- Time zone: UTC+01:00 (CET)
  - Summer (DST): UTC+02:00 (CEST)
- Post Code: 6613 Gjøra

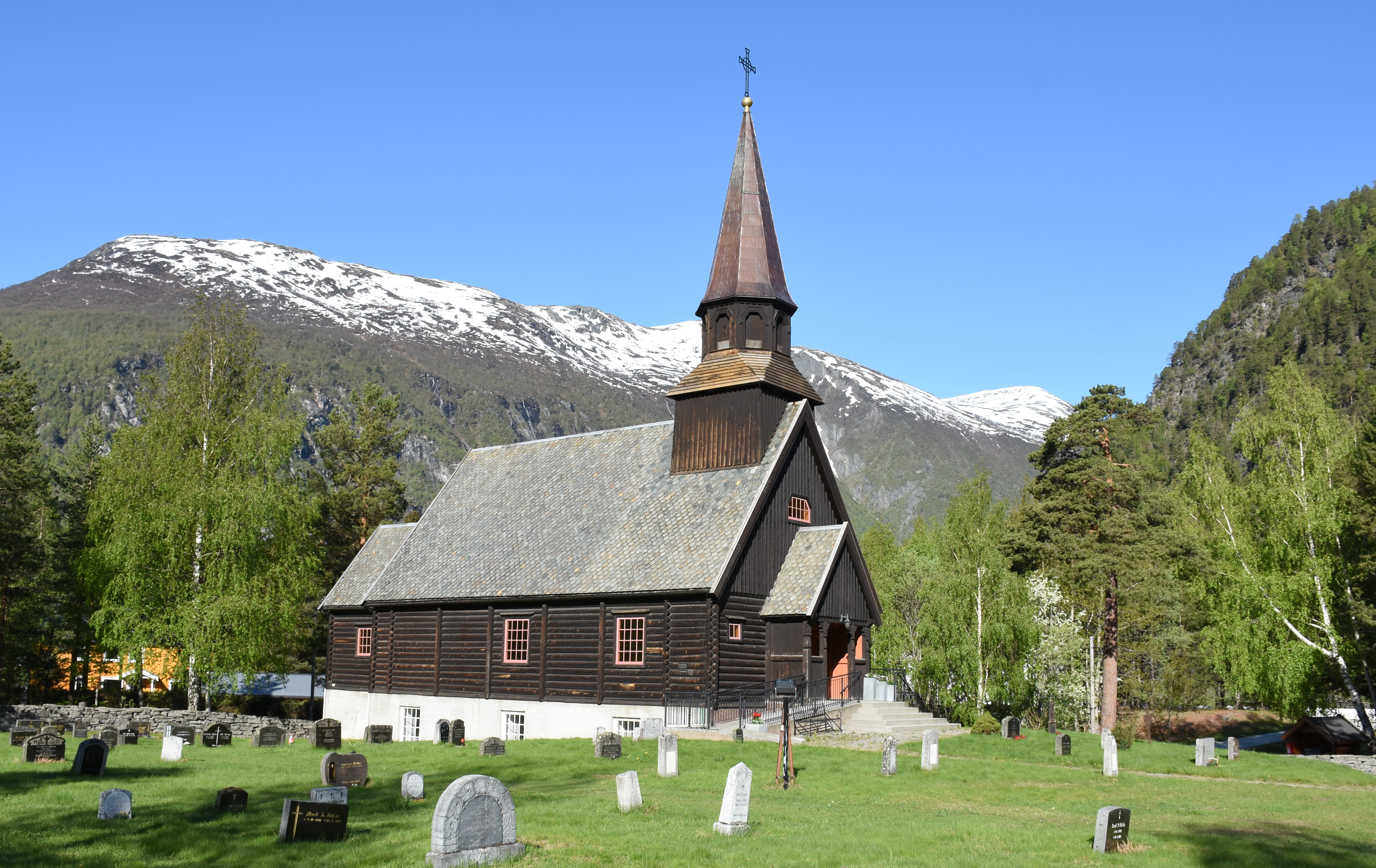

Gjøra is a village in Sunndal Municipality in Møre og Romsdal county, Norway. The village is located along the river Driva in the inner part of the Sunndalen valley. The village sits about 3 kilometres (1.9 mi) southwest of the municipal and county border with Oppdal Municipality in Trøndelag county. Norwegian National Road 70 runs through the village and Gjøra Chapel is also located here.

The Svøufallet waterfall lies about 5 kilometres (3.1 mi) to the southwest of the village.
