= List of waterfalls by height =

The following are lists of waterfalls in the world by height, classified into two categories — natural and artificial. Natural waterfalls are further subdivided between overall height and tallest single drop. Each column (Waterfall, Height, Locality, Country) is sortable by using the up/down link in the column headings at the top of each column.

== World's tallest natural waterfalls ==
=== By overall height ===
This list consists of notable waterfalls which are known to have an overall height of at least 600 m (1,969 ft). Underwater falls, such as the 3,505 m (11,499 ft) Denmark Strait cataract, are not included.

Waterfall	Image	Height	Locality	Country	Ref
Angel Falls		979 metres (3,212 ft)	Bolívar	Venezuela	
Tugela Falls		947 metres (3,107 ft)	KwaZulu-Natal	South Africa	
Tres Hermanas Falls		914 metres (2,999 ft)	Junin	Peru	
Olo'upena Falls		900 metres (2,953 ft)	Hawaii	United States	
Yumbilla Falls		896 metres (2,940 ft)	Amazonas	Peru	
Skorga		875 metres (2,871 ft)	Møre og Romsdal	Norway	
Balåifossen		850 metres (2,789 ft)	Vestland	Norway	
Vinnufossen		845 metres (2,772 ft)	Møre og Romsdal	Norway	
Mattenbachfall		840 metres (2,756 ft)	Lauterbrunnental	Switzerland	
Pu'uka'oku Falls		840 metres (2,756 ft)	Hawaii	United States	
James Bruce Falls		840 metres (2,756 ft)	British Columbia	Canada	
Browne Falls		836 metres (2,743 ft)	Southland	New Zealand	
Strupenfossen		820 metres (2,690 ft)	Vestland	Norway	
Ramnefjellsfossen		818 metres (2,684 ft)	Vestland	Norway	
Waihilau Falls		792 metres (2,598 ft)	Hawaii	United States	
Colonial Creek Falls		788 metres (2,585 ft)	Washington	United States	
Mongefossen		773 metres (2,536 ft)	Møre og Romsdal	Norway	
Gocta Cataracts		771 metres (2,530 ft)	Amazonas	Peru	
Mutarazi Falls		762 metres (2,500 ft)	Manicaland	Zimbabwe	
Kjelfossen		755 metres (2,477 ft)	Vestland	Norway	
Johannesburg Falls		751 metres (2,464 ft)	Washington	United States	
Yosemite Falls		739 metres (2,425 ft)	California	United States	
Cloudcap Falls		732 m (2,402 ft)	Washington	United States	
Cascades de Trou de Fer		725 metres (2,379 ft)	Réunion	France	
Ølmåafossen		720 metres (2,362 ft)	Møre og Romsdal	Norway	
Manawainui Falls		719 metres (2,359 ft)	Hawaii	United States	
Kjeragfossen		715 metres (2,346 ft)	Rogaland	Norway	
Avalanche Basin Falls		707 metres (2,320 ft)	Montana	United States	
Harrison Basin Falls		707 metres (2,320 ft)	Montana	United States	
Haloku Falls		700 metres (2,297 ft)	Hawaii	United States	
Chamberlain Falls		700 metres (2,297 ft)	Southland	New Zealand	
Døntefossen		700 metres (2,297 ft)	Møre og Romsdal	Norway	
Kadamaian Falls		700 metres (2,297 ft)	Kinabalu Park, Sabah	Malaysia	
Spirefossen		690 metres (2,264 ft)	Vestland	Norway	
Lake Unknown Falls		680 metres (2,231 ft)	Otago	New Zealand	
Cuquenan Falls		674 metres (2,211 ft)	Bolívar	Venezuela	
Salto Yutaj		671 metres (2,201 ft)	Amazonas	Venezuela	
Cascade Blanche		640 metres (2,100 ft)	Réunion	France	
La Chorrera Falls		590 metres (1,936 ft)	Cundinamarca	Colombia	
Sutherland Falls		580 meters (1,904 ft)	Southland	New Zealand	
Kunchikal Falls		455 m (1,493 ft)	Shimoga, Karnataka	India	

=== By tallest single drop ===
This list consists of the waterfalls which are known to have a singular individual step with a vertical drop of at least 450 m (1,476 ft).

Waterfall	Image	Height	Locality	Country	Ref
Angel Falls		807 metres (2,648 ft)	Bolívar	Venezuela	
Waihilau Falls		792 metres (2,598 ft)	Hawaii	United States	
Mongefossen		773 metres (2,536 ft)	Møre og Romsdal	Norway	
Manawainui Falls		719 metres (2,359 ft)	Hawaii	United States	
Kjeragfossen		715 metres (2,346 ft)	Rogaland	Norway	
Tågfossen		710 metres (2,329 ft)	Møre og Romsdal	Norway	
Ølmåfossen		710 metres (2,329 ft)	Møre og Romsdal	Norway	
Salto Kukenaam		674 metres (2,211 ft)	Bolívar	Venezuela	
Langfoss		612 m (2,008 ft)	Vestland	Norway	
Tverrgrovfossen		610 m (2,001 ft)	Møre og Romsdal	Norway	
Salto de Iguapo		600 m (1,969 ft)	Bolívar	Venezuela	
Vinnufossen		575 metres (1,886 ft)	Møre og Romsdal	Norway	
Kveåfossen		570 m (1,870 ft)	Vestland	Norway	
Høvlafossen		550 m (1,804 ft)	Møre og Romsdal	Norway	
Cascada de Ventisquero Colgante		549 m (1,801 ft)	Aisén	Chile	
Los Chorros de Cura		549 m (1,801 ft)	Aragua	Venezuela	
Catarata Gocta		540 m (1,772 ft)	Amazonas	Peru	
Krokfossen		530 m (1,739 ft)	Vestland	Norway	
Svellofossen		525 m (1,722 ft)	Vestland	Norway	
Heggurfossen		509 m (1,670 ft)	Møre og Romsdal	Norway	
Hannoki Falls		500 m (1,640 ft)	Toyama	Japan	
Ribbon Fall		491 m (1,611 ft)	California	United States	
Wall of Tears		488 m (1,601 ft)	Hawaii	United States	
Mutarazi Falls		479 m (1,572 ft)	Manicaland	Zimbabwe	
Lake Frances Falls		475 m (1,558 ft)	Montana	United States	
Cerberus Falls		475 m (1,558 ft)	British Columbia	Canada	
Flueseelifall		465 m (1,526 ft)	Bern	Switzerland	
Cascada de Piedra Bolada		453 m (1,486 ft)	Chihuahua	Mexico	
Keana'awi Falls		450 m (1,476 ft)	Hawaii	United States	

== World's tallest artificial waterfalls ==
These are some of the more notable artificial waterfalls.

Waterfall	Height	Complex	Country	Image	Remarks
Cascata delle Marmore	165 metres (541 ft)	Parco Fluviale del Nera	Italy		Created by the ancient Romans.
Hverfandi	Approx. 100 metres (328 ft)	Fljótsdalshérað	Iceland		Overflow falls from the reservoir of the Kárahnjúkar Hydropower Plant; only flows during high water periods
Edmonton Great Divide Waterfall	64 meters (210 ft)	High Level Bridge	Canada		Not operational since 2009, but plans to restart it are being considered.
Lake Peigneur	50 meters (164 ft)	Delcambre Canal	United States		Resulted from a major oil drilling disaster in Louisiana. Lasted for 3 days.
Rain Vortex	40 metres (131 ft)	Jewel Changi Airport	Singapore		World's tallest indoor waterfall.
Cloud Forest Indoor Waterfall	35 metres (115 ft)	Cloud Forest, Gardens by the Bay	Singapore		Previously the world's tallest indoor waterfall.
Jurong Falls	30 metres (98 ft)	Jurong Bird Park	Singapore		Previously the world's tallest indoor waterfall.
Viktoriapark Waterfall	24 metres (79 ft)	Viktoriapark	Germany		
Lotte Music Fountain	18.2 metres (60 ft)	Aqua Mall, Lotte Department Store (Busan)	South Korea		Center column is considered an indoor waterfall, despite being known as a fountain.

== See also ==
- List of waterfalls
- List of waterfalls by flow rate
- List of waterfalls by type
