= Gjøra Chapel =

Church in Møre og Romsdal, Norway

- Gjøra kapell
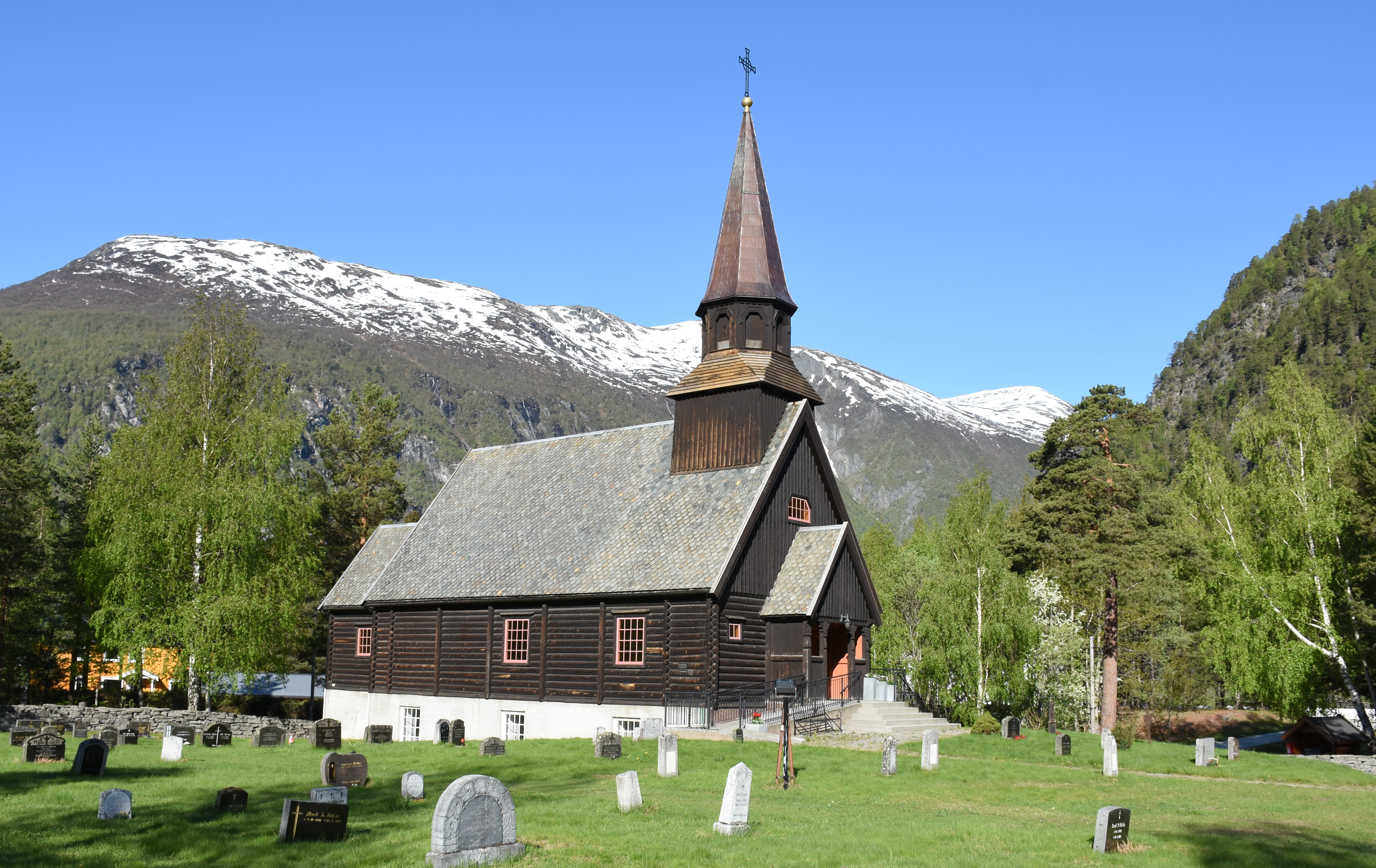
- View of the chapel
- Gjøra Chapel
- 62°32′59″N 9°06′47″E
- Location: Sunndal Municipality, Møre og Romsdal
- Country: Norway
- Denomination: Church of Norway
- Churchmanship: Evangelical Lutheran

History
- Status: Chapel
- Founded: 1935
- Consecrated: 1935

Architecture
- Functional status: Active
- Architect: Johan Meyer
- Architectural type: Long church
- Completed: 1935 (91 years ago)

Specifications
- Capacity: 100
- Materials: Wood

Administration
- Diocese: Møre bispedømme
- Deanery: Indre Nordmøre prosti
- Parish: Romfo
- Norwegian Cultural Heritage Site
- Type: Church
- Status: Listed
- ID: 84264

Gjøra Chapel (Norwegian: Gjøra kapell) is a chapel of the Church of Norway in Sunndal Municipality in Møre og Romsdal county, Norway. It is located in the village of Gjøra. It is an annex chapel in the Romfo parish which is part of the Indre Nordmøre prosti (deanery) in the Diocese of Møre. The brown, wooden chapel was built in a long church style in 1935 by the architect Johan Meyer. The chapel seats about 100 people.

== History ==
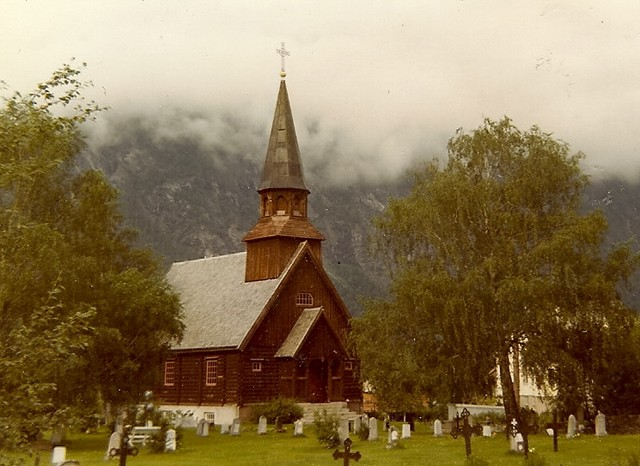
View of the chapel

In 1888, governmental permission was granted to build a cemetery in Gjøra to serve the far eastern portion of Sunndal Municipality so people didn't have to travel all the way to Romfo Church to bury their dead. Soon after, the residents began asking for permission to build a chapel at the site of the cemetery. In 1935, a new chapel was built at the site. It was designed by Johan Meyer. The chapel has a full basement which is the location of the church hall. The building was refurbished in 1964–1965.

== See also ==
- List of churches in Møre
