= Tres Hermanas Falls =

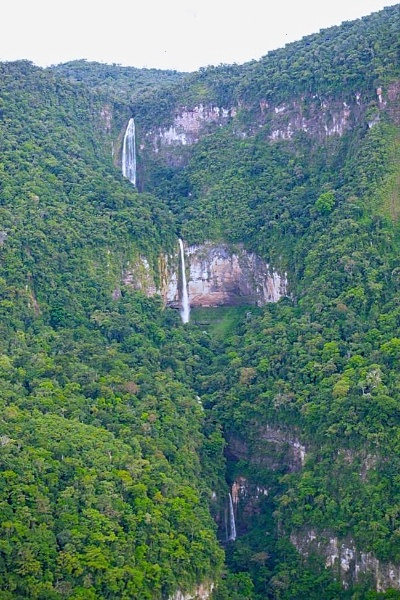

- Location within Peru
- Location: Otishi National Park, Junín Region, Peru
- Coordinates: 11.9781°S 73.6481°W
- Type: Tiered
- Total height: 914 m (2,999 ft)
- Number of drops: 3
- World height ranking: 3

Tres Hermanas Falls (Spanish for Three Sisters) is reportedly the third tallest waterfall in the world, with a height of 914 metres (2,999 ft). It is located inside Otishi National Park, near the northern fork of the Cutibireni River, in the Peruvian region of Junín.

Tres Hermanas is a tiered waterfall, with three drops or sections and is surrounded by montane forest.

== See also ==
- List of waterfalls
- List of waterfalls by height
