= Waihilau Falls =

Coordinates: 20°06′48″N 155°39′27″W

- Interactive map of Waihilau Falls
- Location: Waimanu Valley, Hawaii (big island), United States
- Type: Horsetail
- Total height: 2,600 feet (790 m)
- Number of drops: 1
- Longest drop: 2,600 feet (790 m)
- Watercourse: Waihilau River
- World height ranking: 13

Waihilau Falls is a waterfall in the Waimanu Valley, in the U.S. state of Hawaii on the island of Hawaii, the state's biggest and youngest island. It is the third-tallest waterfall in Hawaii and the thirteenth-highest in the world at 2,600 feet (790 m) in height. It consists of three slender threads of water falling down through lush greenery.

== See also ==
- List of waterfalls
- List of Hawaii waterfalls
- List of waterfalls by height
