= Cascada de Ventisquero Colgante =

Chilean waterfall

Coordinates: 44.43658°S 72.50385°W

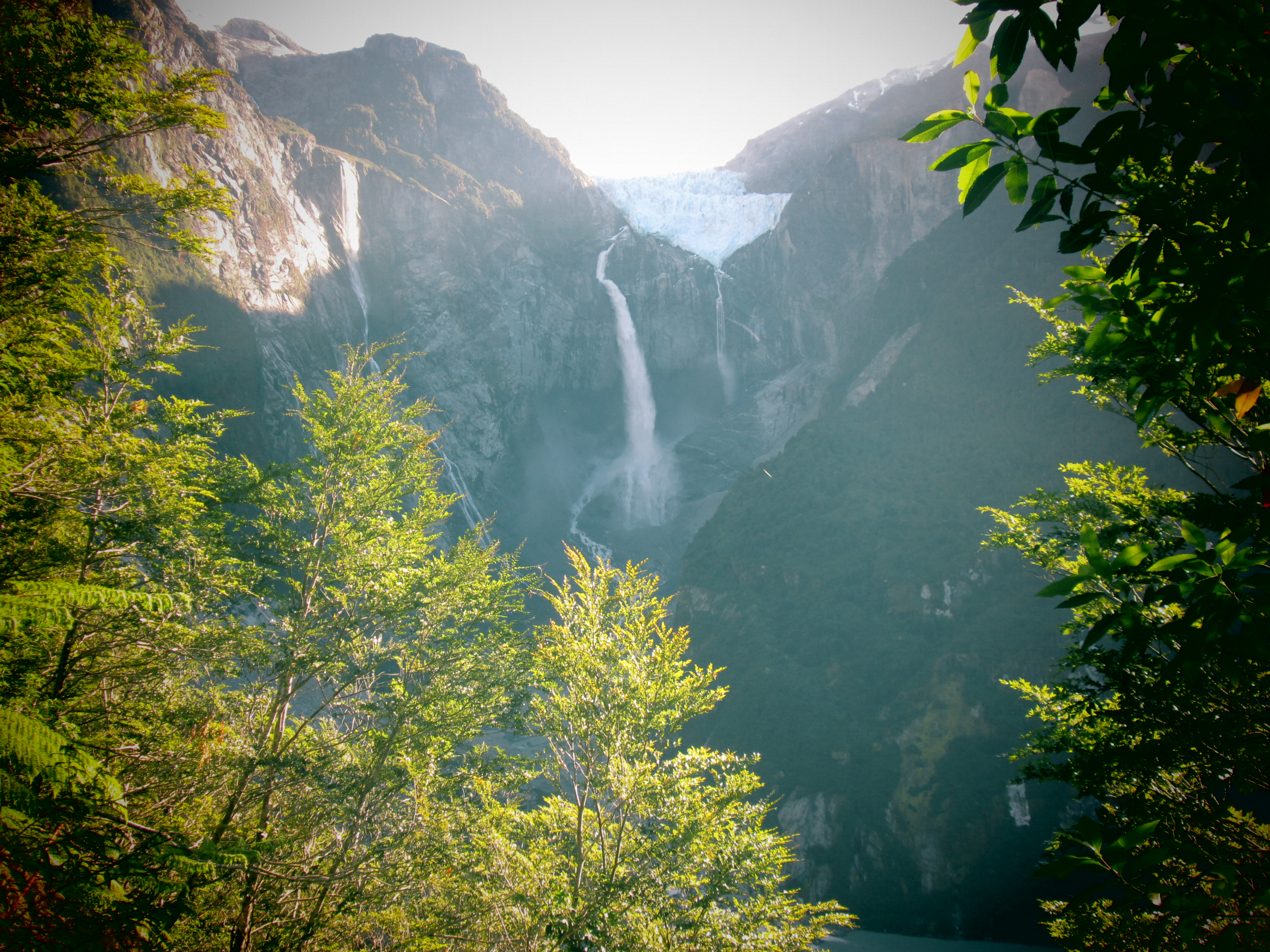
The Cascada de Ventisquero Colgante Waterfall

Cascada de Ventisquero Colgante ('Hanging Glacier Falls') is a veiling plunge waterfall in Queulat National Park, in Chile's Aysén region, 10 miles south of the town of Puyuhuapi. The waterfall consists of a single vertical (i.e.: 90 degree) drop that the meltwaters of the Ventisquero Colgante glacier fall down before sliding along an angled layer of bedrock, flowing into the Témpanos river and eventually the Puyuhuapi Channel and Pacific Ocean. The waterfall is at an elevation of 2,850 feet ASL and is a part of the Rio Queulat watershed. The average width of the falls is 100 ft, and its horizontal run is 50 ft. The waterfall's height is conservatively estimated to be 1,800 feet, but due to the lack of reliable measurements, may be as much as 2,000 feet—however, even using the conservative measurement, it is among the five tallest waterfalls in South America.

== History ==
Due to its remote location, Cascada de Ventisquero Colgante is visited more rarely than similar waterfalls, hence the ambiguity about its height. The Ventisquero Colgante glacier, which feeds the falls, was first discovered by Captain Enrique Simpson Baeza in 1875, who observed that the glacier was offset from the Puyuhuapi Channel by only 300 ft. Today, as the glacier has receded, that distance is almost 5 miles. The indigenous Chono people referred to the area surrounding the falls "Queolat," which means "the sound of waterfalls." With the construction of the Carretera Austral in 1982, the Aysén region, within which the falls lie, became more accessible; the following year, the Queulat National Park was created.

== See also ==
- List of waterfalls
- List of waterfalls by height
