= Mongefossen =

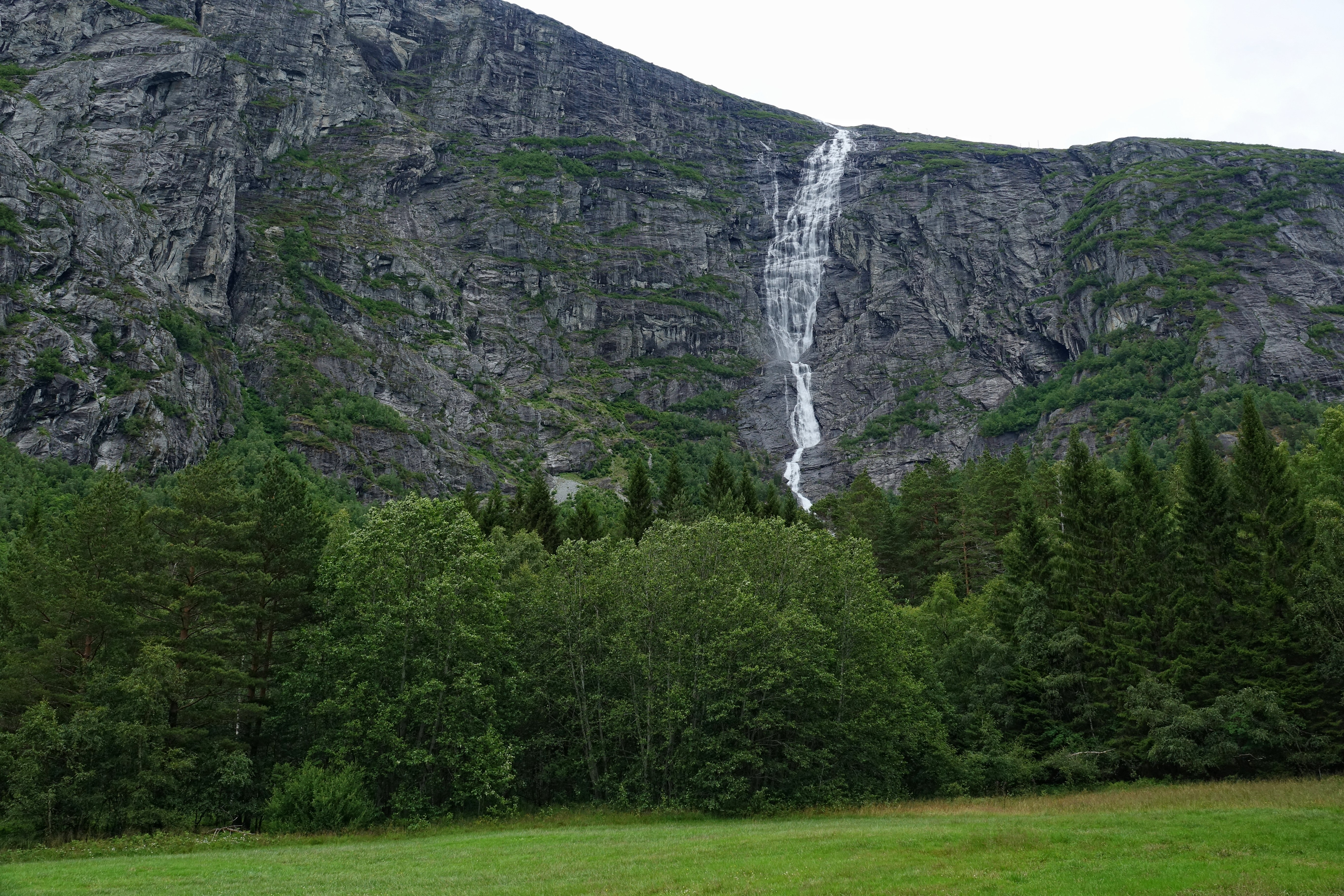
- Mongefossen seen from the nearby road
- Interactive map of Mongefossen
- Location: Møre og Romsdal, Norway
- Coordinates: 62.4428°N 7.8953°E
- Type: Veiling Horsetail
- Elevation: 900 metres (3,000 ft)
- Total height: 773 metres (2,536 ft)
- Number of drops: 1
- Longest drop: 773 metres (2,536 ft)
- Average width: 23 metres (75 ft)
- Run: 610 metres (2,000 ft)
- Watercourse: Monge
- World height ranking: 3

Mongefossen (lit. 'Monge-falls') is a waterfall in the Rauma Municipality of Møre og Romsdal county, Norway.

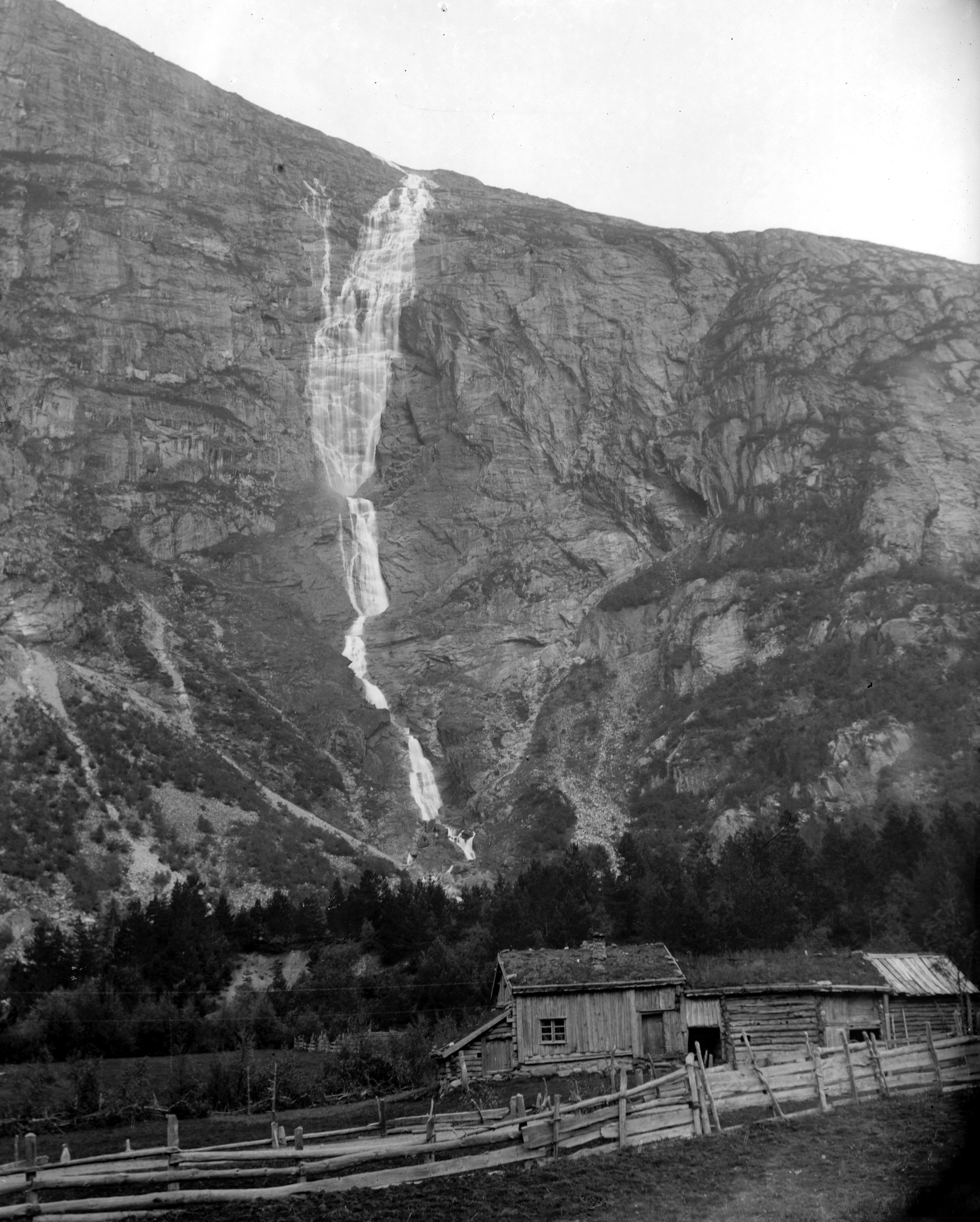
Mongefossen around the year 1900

It is the fourth tallest single-drop waterfall in the world. It's located near the European route E136 highway and the Rauma River, which it flows into. There is some dispute as to the height, but it is generally listed at 773 metres (2,536 ft).

As is the case with many of Norway's waterfalls, it has been targeted for hydroelectric power, which results in a greatly diminished water flow during the summer tourist season.

Mongefossen also holds the distinction as being the highest waterfall in the world which may be viewed from a railway station on the Rauma Line, on the north side between the villages of Flatmark and Marstein.

== See also ==
- List of waterfalls
- List of waterfalls by height
