= Kjeragfossen =

Waterfall in Rogaland, Norway

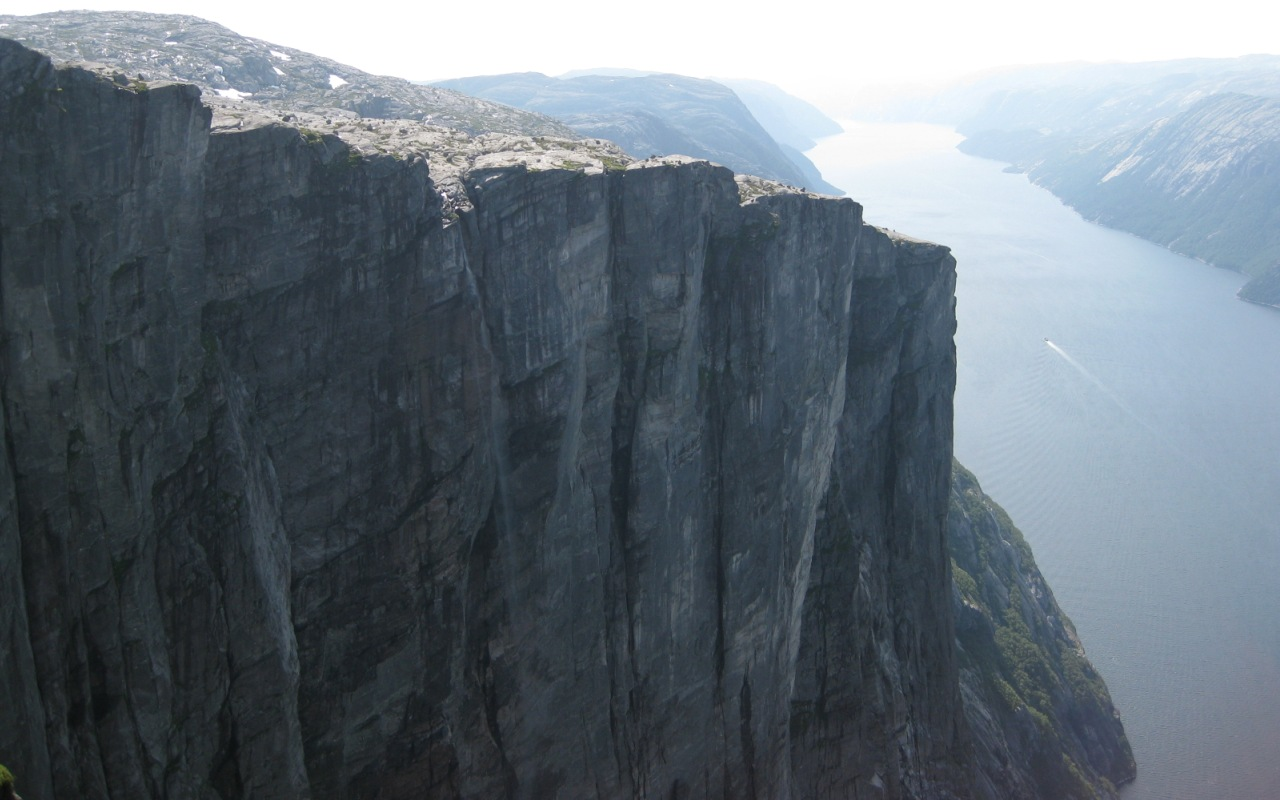
- View of the mountain and waterfall
- Interactive map of Kjeragfossen
- Location: Rogaland, Norway
- Coordinates: 59.03466°N 6.58409°E
- Type: Plunge
- Total height: 715 metres (2,346 ft)
- Number of drops: 1
- Longest drop: 715 metres (2,346 ft)
- Total width: 6 metres (20 ft)

Kjeragfossen is a waterfall in the eastern part of Sandnes Municipality in Rogaland county, Norway. The 715-metre (2,346 ft) waterfall cascades down from the Kjerag plateau on the south shore of the Lysefjorden. It is one of the highest waterfalls in Norway and one of the highest in the world. It is a plunge-style waterfall that is usually only active about 5 months of the year. The waterfall is located in a very scenic area that has many tourists each year. The famous Kjeragbolten boulder is located nearby.

== See also ==
- List of waterfalls
- List of waterfalls by height
- List of waterfalls of Norway
