= Romfo Church =

Church in Møre og Romsdal, Norway

- Romfo kyrkje
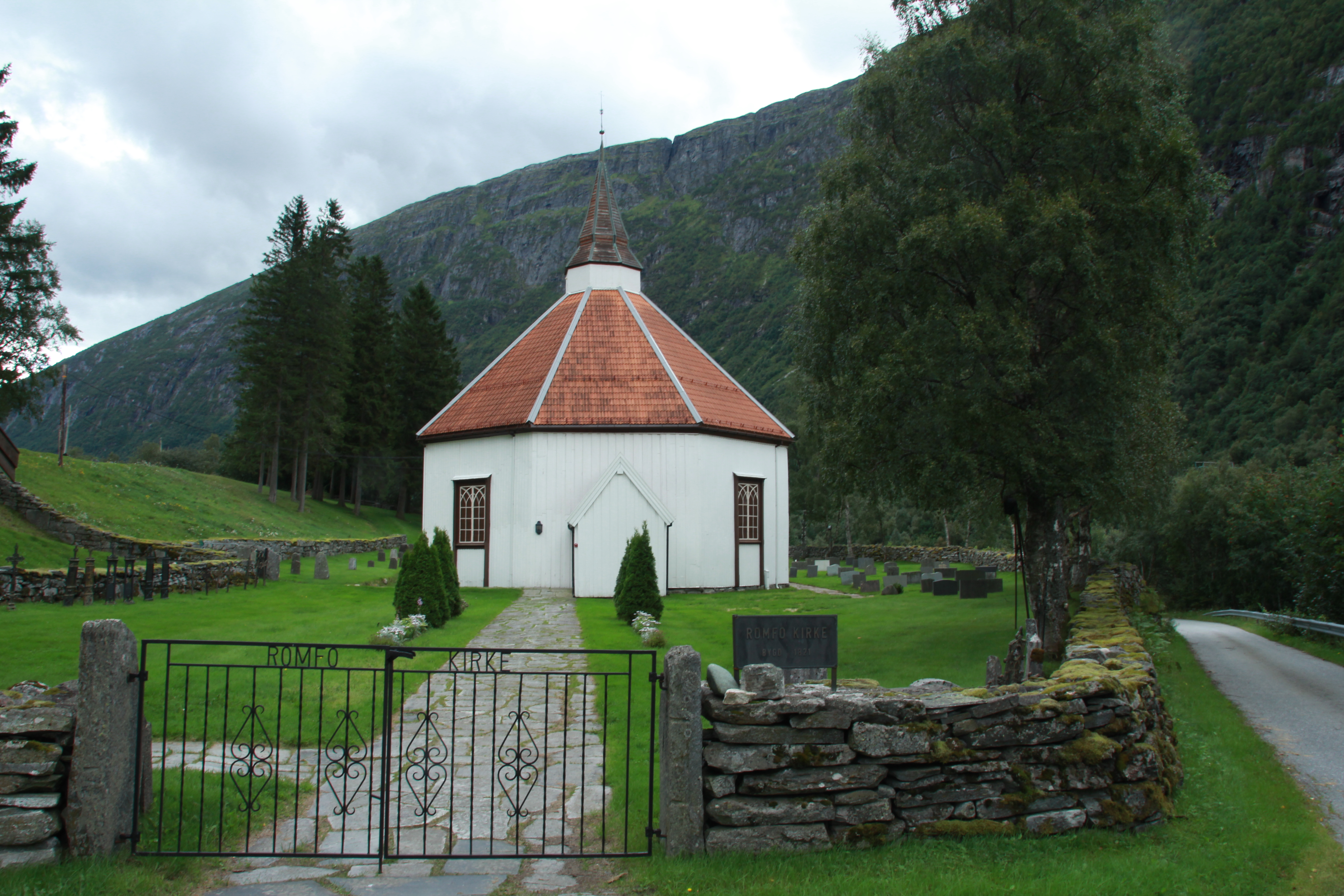
- View of the church
- Romfo Church
- 62°36′09″N 8°56′21″E
- Location: Sunndal Municipality, Møre og Romsdal
- Country: Norway
- Denomination: Church of Norway
- Churchmanship: Evangelical Lutheran

History
- Status: Parish church
- Founded: 14th century
- Consecrated: 14 August 1821

Architecture
- Functional status: Active
- Architect: Ole Pedersen Tøfte
- Architectural type: Octagonal
- Completed: 1821 (205 years ago)

Specifications
- Capacity: 267
- Materials: Wood

Administration
- Diocese: Møre bispedømme
- Deanery: Indre Nordmøre prosti
- Parish: Romfo
- Norwegian Cultural Heritage Site
- Type: Church
- Status: Automatically protected
- ID: 85314

Romfo Church (Norwegian: Romfo kyrkje) is a parish church of the Church of Norway in Sunndal Municipality in Møre og Romsdal county, Norway. It is located in the village of Romfo in the inner part of the Sunndalen valley, along the river Driva. It is the main church for the Romfo parish which is part of the Indre Nordmøre prosti (deanery) in the Diocese of Møre. The white, wooden church was built in an octagonal style in 1821 by the architect Ole Pedersen Tøfte. The church seats about 267 people.

== History ==
The earliest existing historical records of the church date back to 1589, but it was not new that year. The first church here was located along the river Driva about 3 kilometres (1.9 mi) to the east of the present church site, in a place called Musgjerd. The first church was described as a small, rectangular stave church with no tower and it may have been built in the 14th century. The church sat at the base of steep mountains along the Driva river valley and at times over the centuries, it had been damaged in avalanches. In the 1680s, the building was renovated and repaired because it was in such poor condition. The repairs temporarily worked to keep the building in use, but by the early 1700s, the church was again said to be quite dilapidated.

In 1707, the church site was torn down and the church site was moved about 3 kilometres (1.9 mi) further downstream to the northwest to a place called Romfo. The new site was on a large flat area in the centre of the river valley which had a much smaller chance of being damaged by an avalanch. The new church at Romfo was completed in 1708. It was a timber-framed long church with a tower, and some materials from the old Musgjerd church were reused in the construction of the church. In the early 1800s, the church was damaged by flooding on the nearby river Driva, so it was decided to move the church a little further away from the river on some higher ground. In 1820, the old church was torn down and work on a new church began. The new building was constructed from 1820-1821 and it was consecrated on 14 August 1821 by the Bishop Peder Olivarius Bugge. The new church had an octagonal design with a church porch on the west end. Later, a sacristy on the east end of the building. In 1890, a number of changes were made to the interior, and the church was painted inside and out. In 1937-1940, the church was restored back to its original appearance.

== Media gallery ==
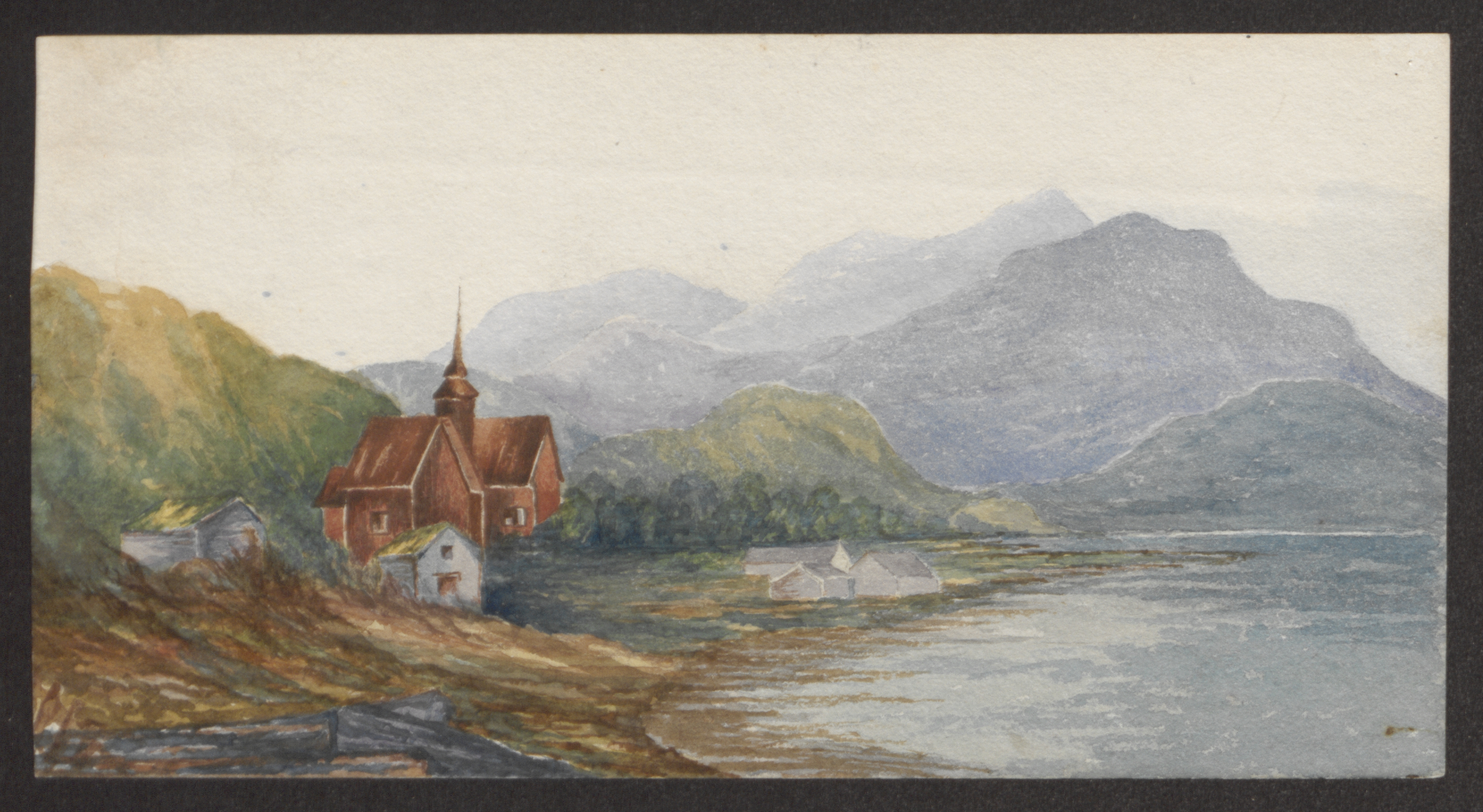
Painting of the old church building (1708-1820)

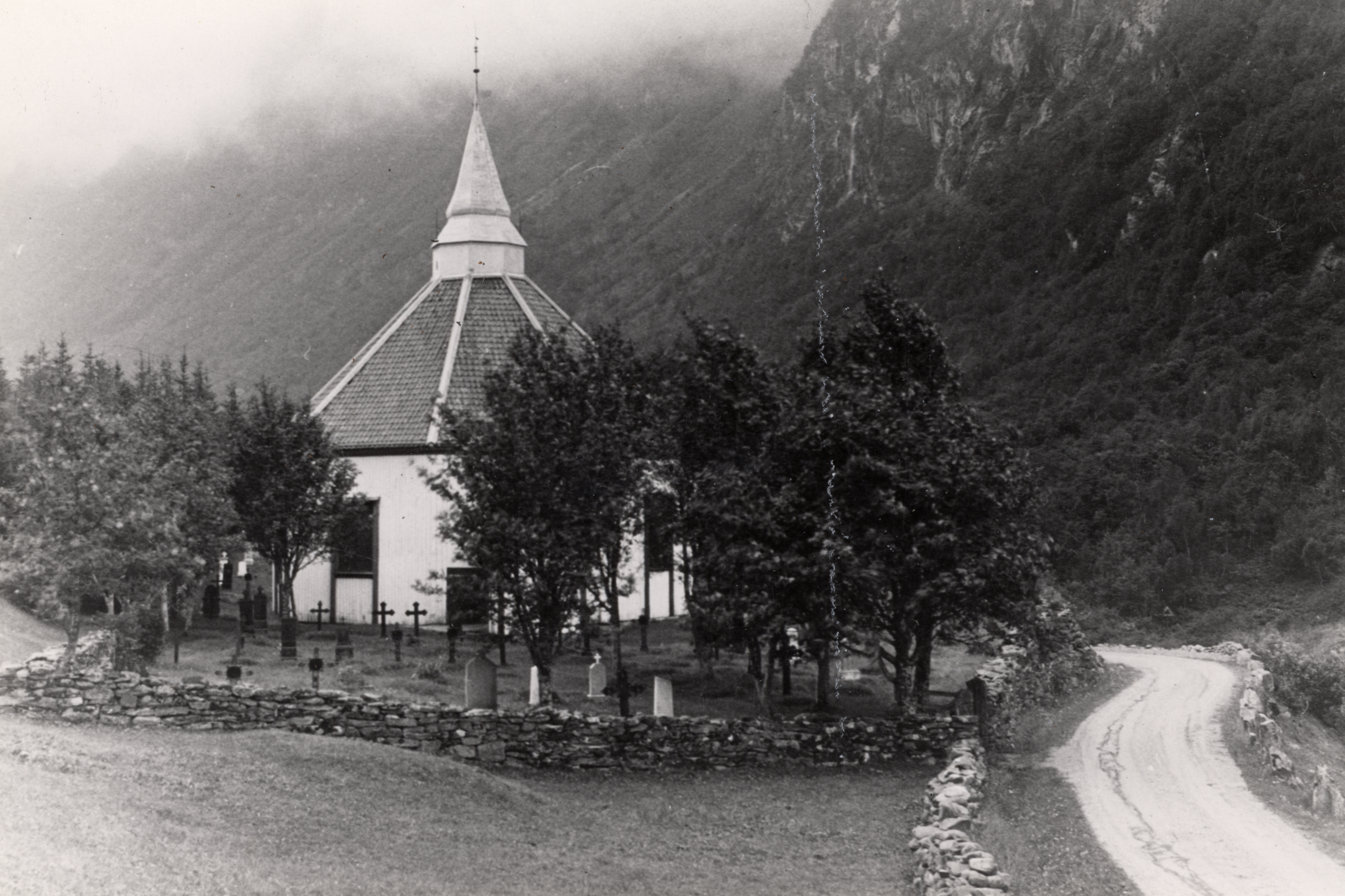
Photo of the present church (1934)

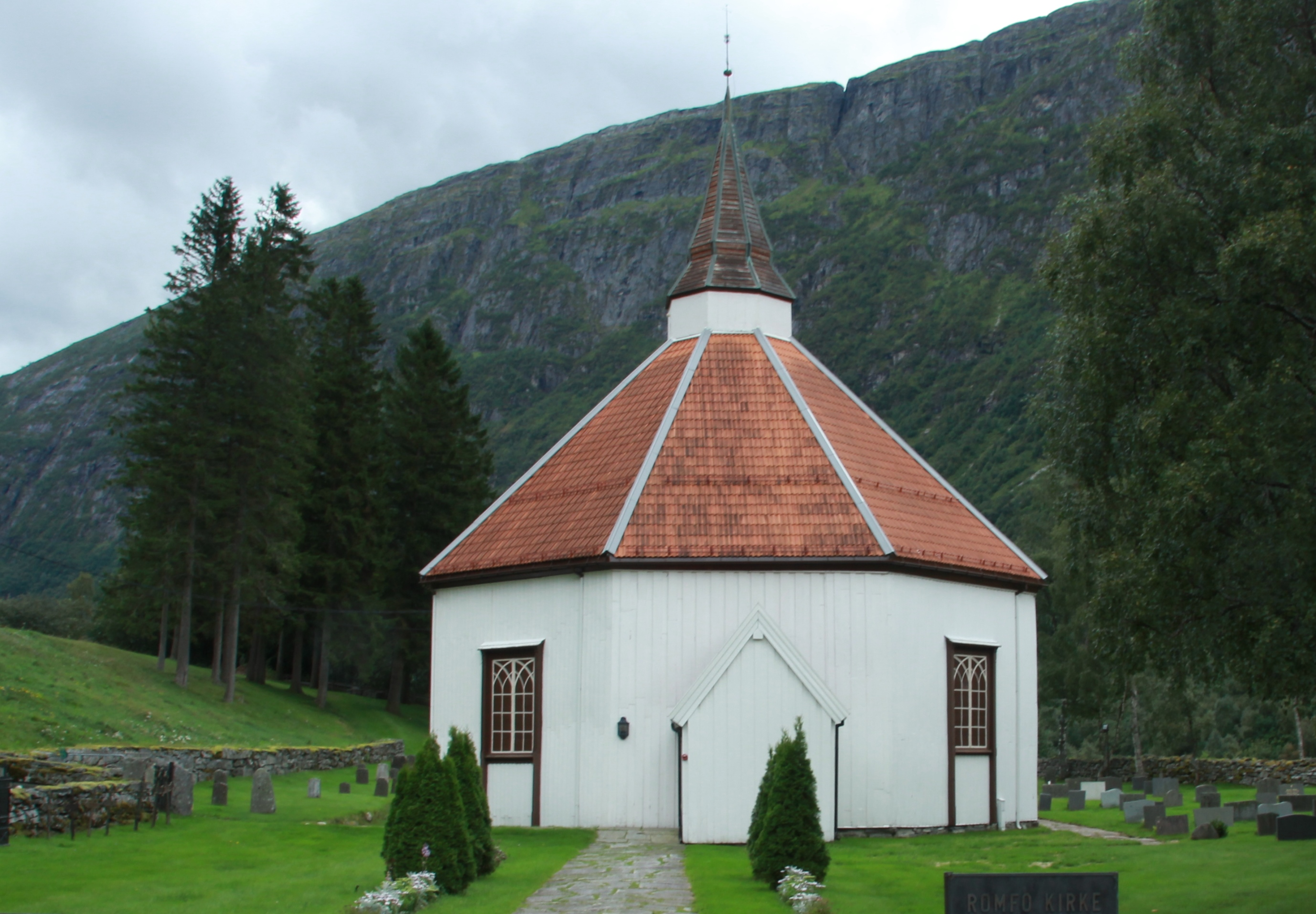
Photo of the present church (2013)

== See also ==
- List of churches in Møre
