= Hoelsand =

Village in Sunndal Municipality, Norway

Hoelsand Holssanden
- Village
- Interactive map of Hoelsand; Holssanden
- Location within Møre og Romsdal Location within Norway
- Coordinates: 62.6602°N 8.6354°E
- Country: Norway
- Region: Western Norway
- County: Møre og Romsdal
- District: Nordmøre
- Municipality: Sunndal Municipality

Area
  - Total: 0.2 km^{2} (0.077 sq mi)
- Elevation: 16 m (52 ft)

Population (2024)
  - Total: 324
  - Density: 1,620/km^{2} (4,200/sq mi)
- Time zone: UTC+01:00 (CET)
  - Summer (DST): UTC+02:00 (CEST)
- Post Code: 6600 Sunndalsøra

Hoelsand or Holssanden is a village in Sunndal Municipality in Møre og Romsdal county, Norway. The village is located along the river Driva, just west of the Vinnufossen waterfall. The village lies along the Norwegian National Road 70, about 4 kilometres (2.5 mi) east of the village of Sunndalsøra and about 5 kilometres (3.1 mi) west of the village of Grøa.

The 0.2-square-kilometre (49-acre) village has a population (2024) of 324 and a population density of 1,620 inhabitants per square kilometre (4,200/sq mi).
