= Colonial Creek Falls =

Waterfall in Washington (state), United States

- Interactive map of Colonial Creek Falls
- Location: North Cascades National Park, Washington, U.S.
- Coordinates: 48.67023°N 121.14044°W
- Total height: 2,568 ft (783 m)
- Number of drops: 14
- Watercourse: Colonial Creek

Colonial Creek Falls is the tallest waterfall in the continental United States. In a horizontal traverse of more than 4,200 feet (1,300 m), it falls 2,568 feet (783 m) vertically in 13 distinct drops, with an average incline of 65 degrees.

According to the World Waterfall Database, it is the tallest waterfall in the continental United States, and is the 15th tallest in the world, exceeding the more renowned Yosemite Falls in height by 143 feet.

== See also ==
- List of waterfalls
- List of waterfalls by height
