= Waimanu Valley =

Valley on The Big Island, Hawaii

Waimanu Valley is a remote valley on the northeast coast of Hawaiʻi island. Besides the main Waimanu Stream, it includes Waihīlau Falls on a tributary.

== Description ==
Wai manu literally means "bird water" or "river of birds" in the Hawaiian language. During the time of Ancient Hawaii it was an ahupuaʻa, or ancient land division with a small village. Most of the area is state forest land, with a few campsites available with reservations. It is located in the Hāmākua district of Hawaiʻi island. The Waimanu Stream watershed includes many smaller flows from Kohala Mountain to the Pacific Ocean at sea level. A system of dikes of hard lava rock force large amounts of ground water dropped from the tradewinds into this valley, making it very different from the smaller shallow valleys directly to the west. This ridge is administered as the Puʻu O ʻUmi Natural State Area Reserve.

Tributary Waihīlau Stream starts at about 3,500 feet (1,100 m) elevation at 20°6′17″N 155°39′44″W and flows into Waimanu Stream in the valley. Waihīlau Falls is one of the tallest single drops of a waterfall in the United States. It descends from about 3,000 feet (910 m) at 20°6′45″N 155°39′27″W to about 400 feet (120 m) elevation. The name comes from wai hī lau which means "many trickling waters" since during heavy rains the stream splits into many smaller streams overflowing the cliff. Waimanu Stream empties into Waimanu Bay at sea level at 20°8′35″N 155°38′2″W. Other streams with waterfalls in the valley include Waiʻilikahi Falls and Lahomene Falls.

The valley is not accessible by automobile. A foot trail called Waimanu or Muliwai Trail leads down a steep path from the Waipiʻo Valley. At the south end of the valley, Waimanu Gap at 2,089 feet (637 m) elevation leads to the upper end of Waipiʻo Valley.
