= Mågålaupet =

Gorge in the river Driva in Norway

- Magalaupet / Måggålaupet

Geology
- Type: Gorge

Geography
- Location: Trøndelag, Norway
- Coordinates: 62°30′00″N 09°35′14″E

Location
- Interactive map of the location

Mågålaupet (also written Magalaupet or Måggålaupet) is a 100-meter (330 ft) long, zigzag-shaped gorge in the river Driva in Oppdal Municipality in Trøndelag county, Norway. It is located in the Drivdalen valley, about 12 kilometres (7.5 mi) to the south of the village of Oppdal. The narrowest point is 1.5 meters (4 ft 11 in) wide.

The gorge consists of a series of large interconnected giant's kettles formed by the river Driva since the last ice age. The bedrock in the gorge is hard gneiss.

Giant's kettles in Mågålaupet

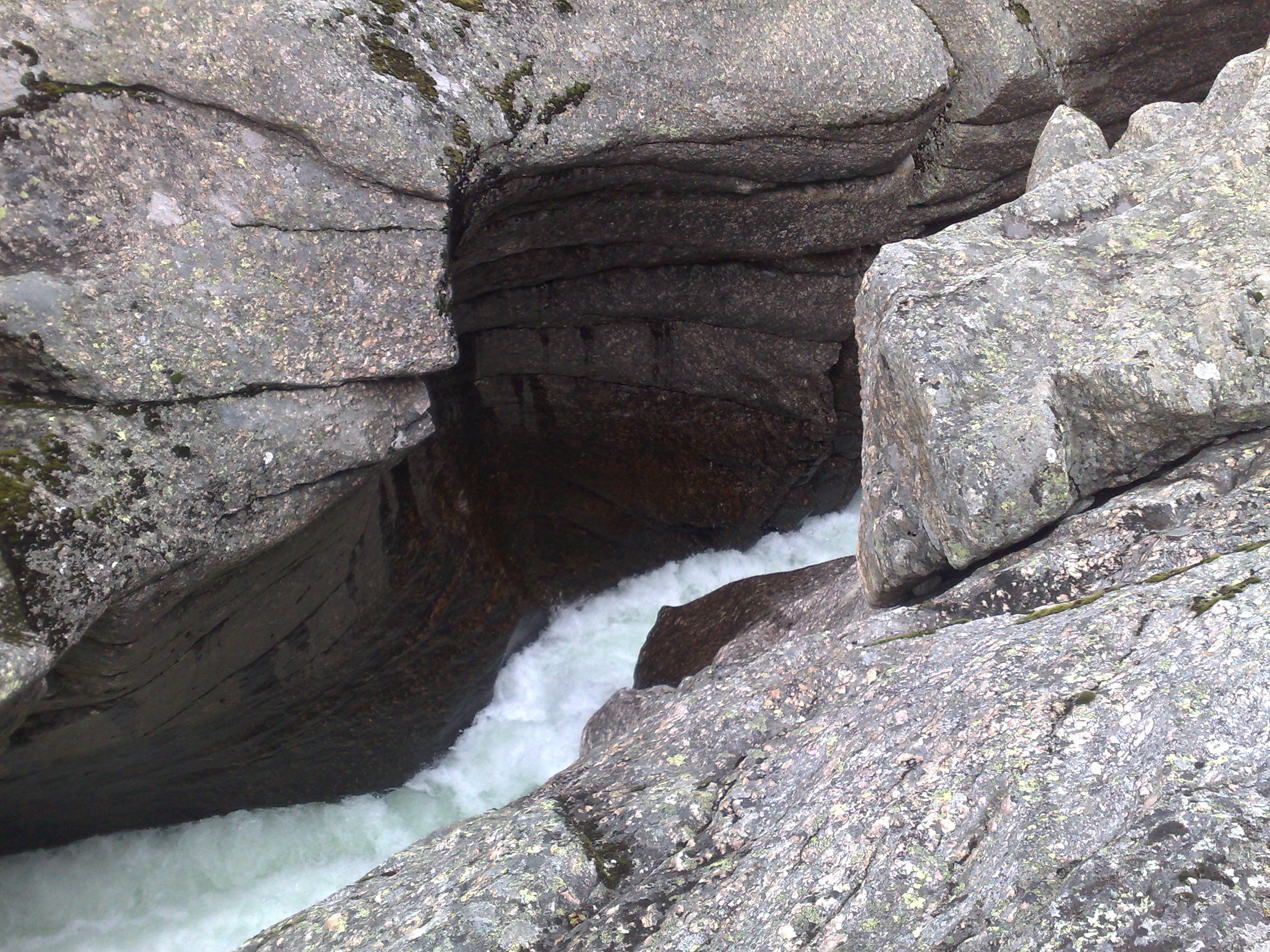

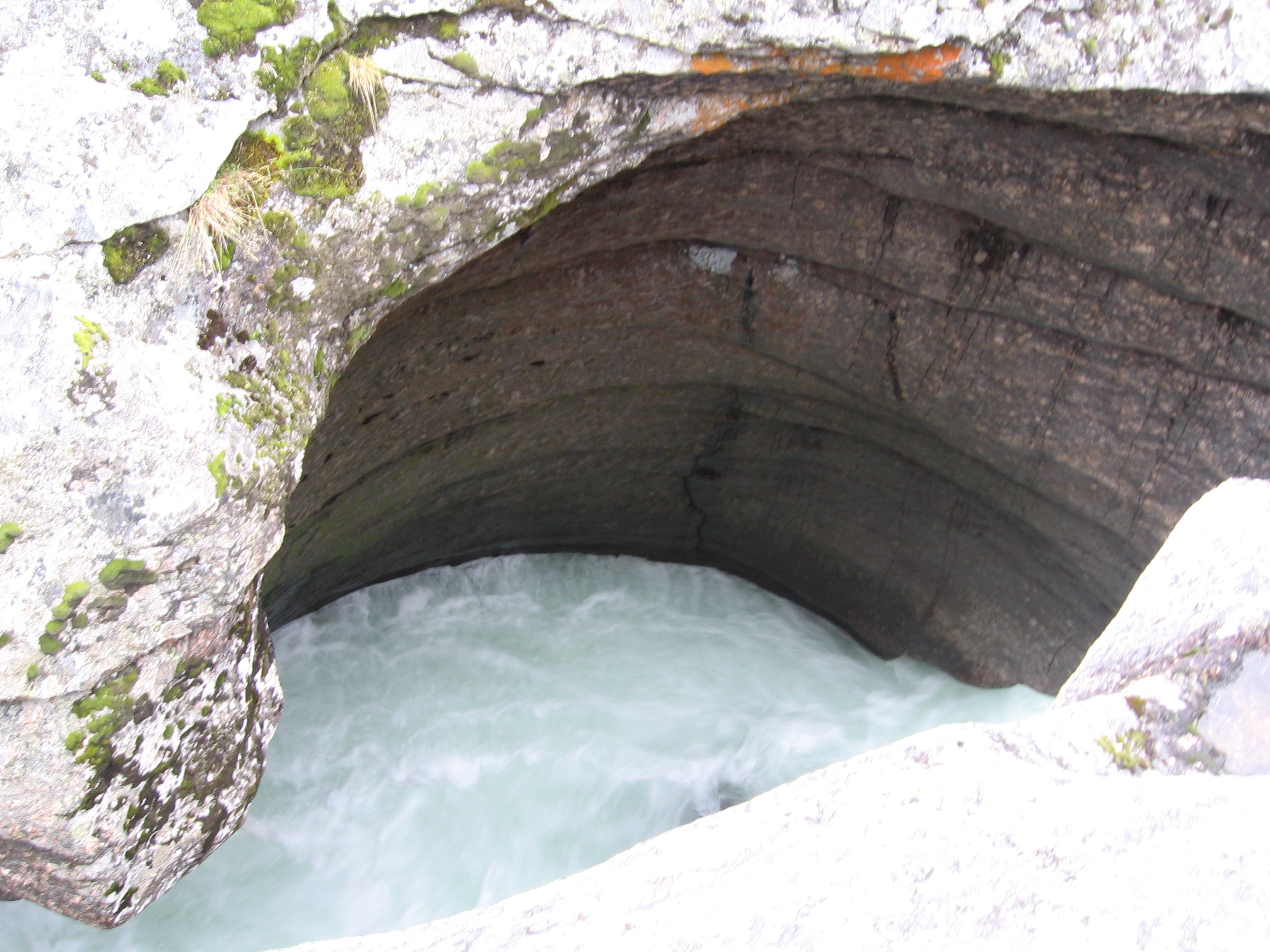
