= Kadamaian Falls =

Kadamaian Waterfall
- From the south. Taken from Kiau Gap View.
- Interactive map of Kadamaian Waterfall
- Location: Sabah, Malaysia
- Coordinates: 6°2′18.73″N 116°32′34.06″E
- Type: waterfall

Kadamaian Waterfall is a cascading waterfall approximately 700 m (2,300 ft) high on the southern flank of the Mount Kinabalu. It is the longest waterfall in Malaysia and can be seen from the Tamparuli-Ranau road. However it is not easily accessible.

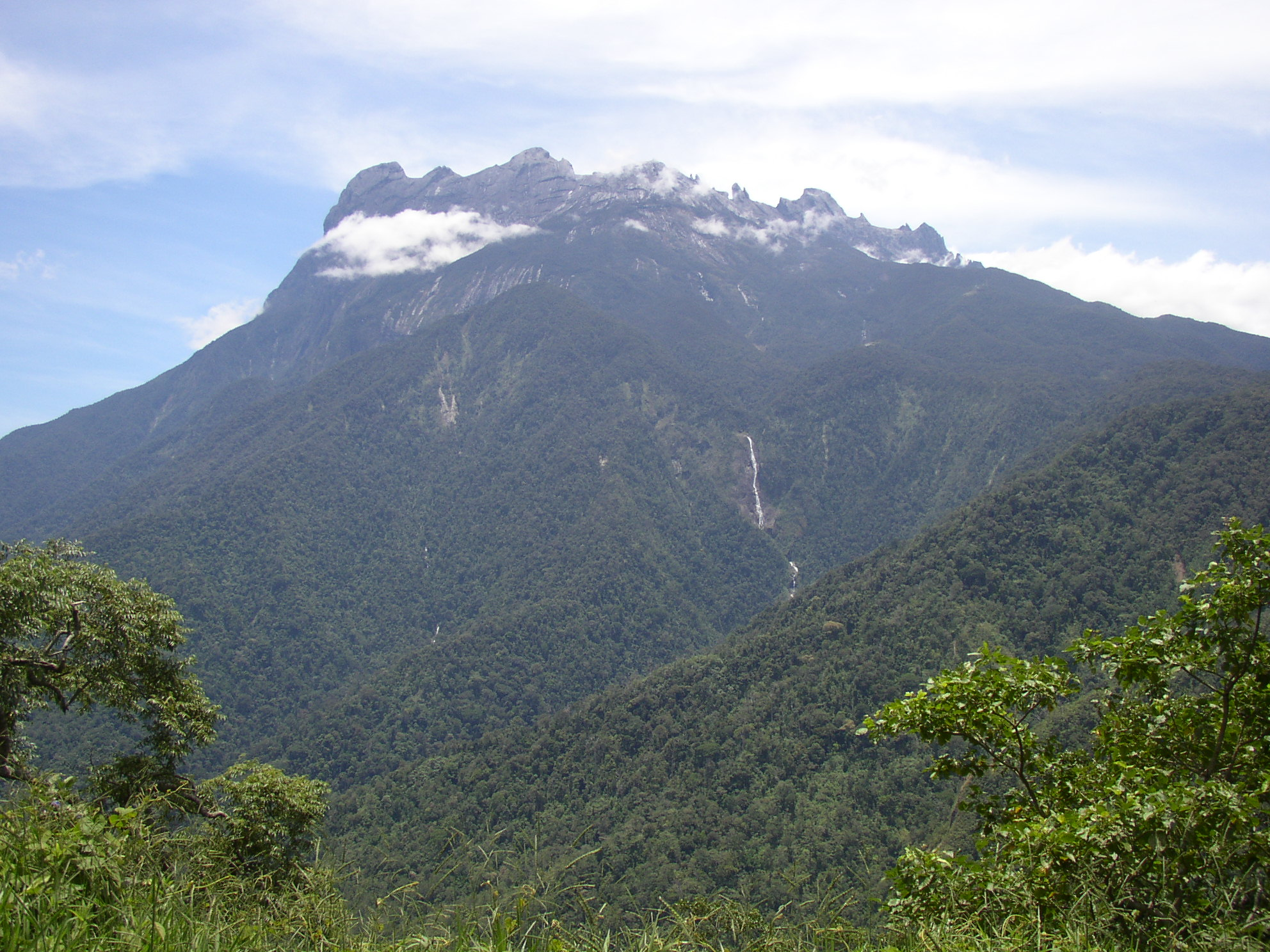
Mount Kinabalu as seen from the southwest. Kadamaian Falls is in a little to the right of center.

== See also ==
- List of waterfalls
