= Vinnufossen =

Vinnufossen Vinnufallet
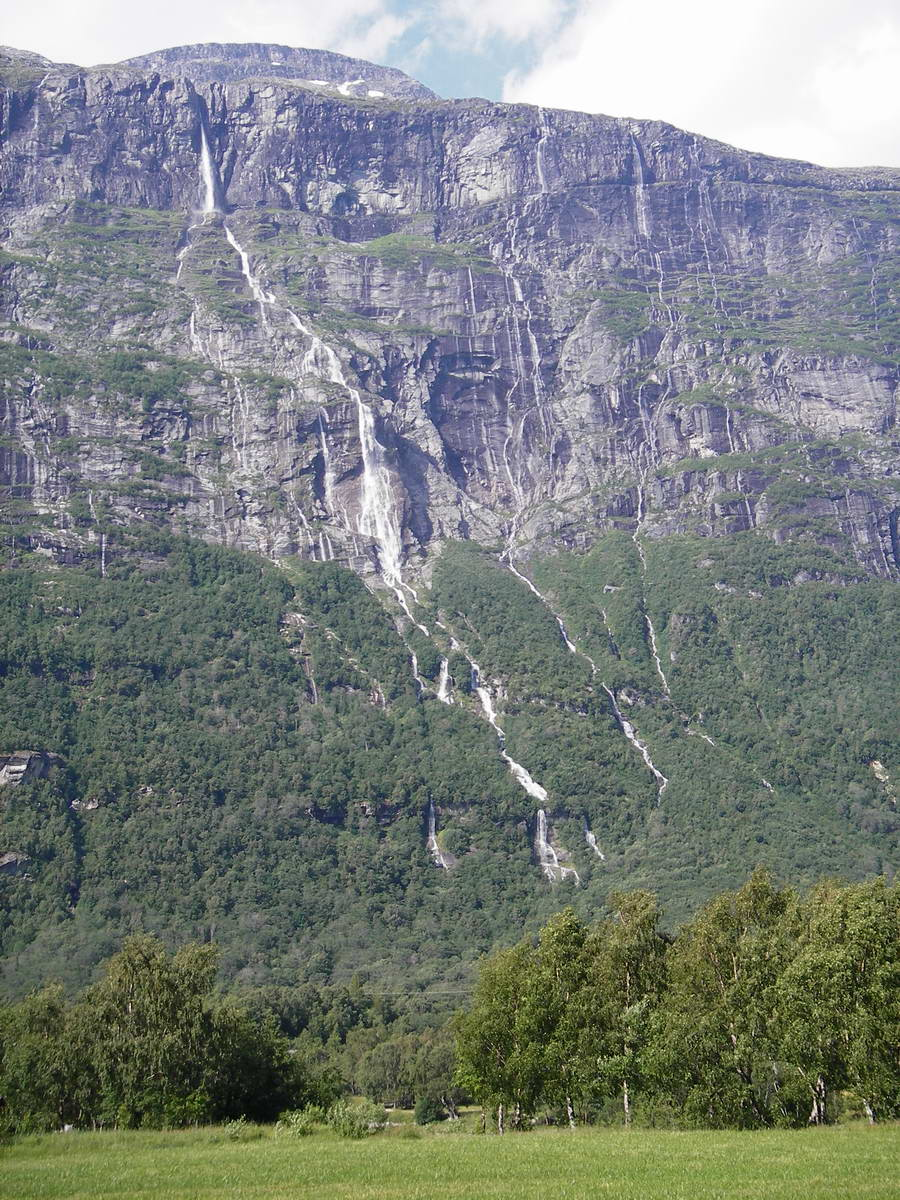
- View of the waterfall
- Location: Møre og Romsdal, Norway
- Coordinates: 62°39′51″N 8°40′11″E
- Type: Tiered horsetails
- Total height: 845 m (2,772 ft)
- Number of drops: 3
- Longest drop: 575 m (1,886 ft)
- Average width: 38 m (125 ft)
- Average flow rate: 37.5 m^{3}/s (1,320 cu ft/s)
- World height ranking: 6

Vinnufossen or Vinnufallet is one of the tallest waterfalls in Europe and the eighth-tallest in the world. The 845 m (2,772 ft) tall tiered horsetail waterfall is located just east of the village of Sunndalsøra in Sunndal Municipality in Møre og Romsdal county, Norway. The falls are part of the Vinnu river which flows down from the Vinnufjellet mountain and it is fed from the Vinnufonna glacier. The falls flow into the Driva river near the village of Hoelsand.

== See also ==
- List of waterfalls
- List of waterfalls by height
