= Rivière du Mât =

Coordinates: 20°58′50″S 55°42′0″E

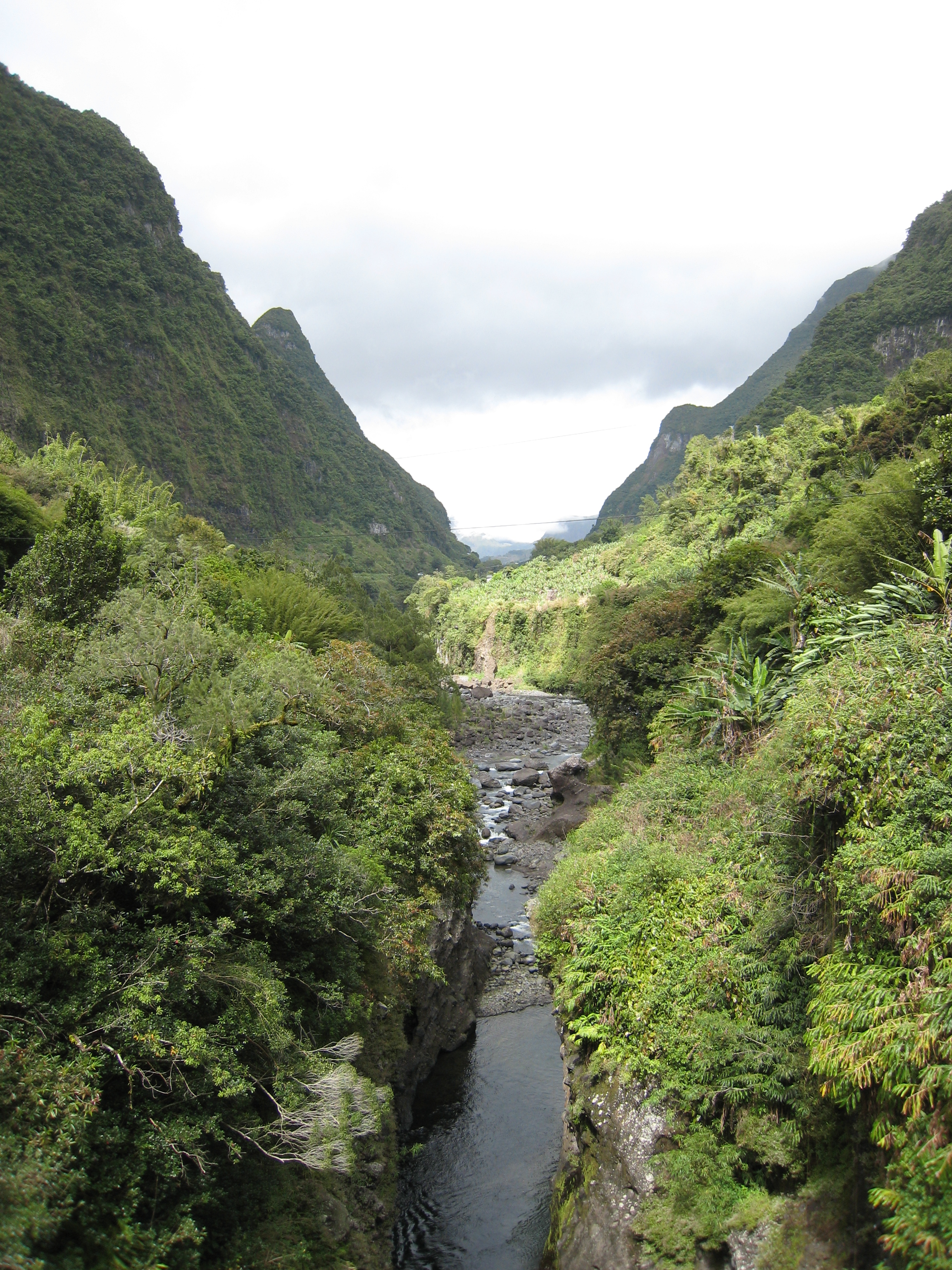

Location
- Country: France
- Region: Réunion

Physical characteristics
- Mouth: Indian Ocean
- Length: 34.8 km (21.6 mi)

The Rivière du Mât is a river on the Indian Ocean island of Réunion. It is 34.8 km (21.6 mi) long. It flows northeast from its sources on the slopes of Le Gros Morne and Piton des Neiges, reaching the sea close to Saint-André.
