= Driva =

River in Trøndelag, Norway

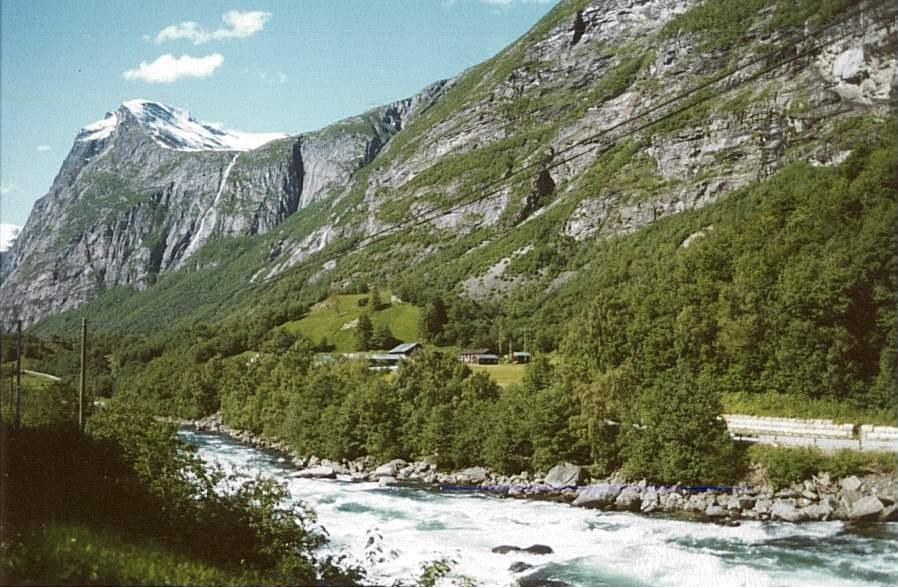
- Driva river in Sunndalen

Location
- Country: Norway
- Counties: Trøndelag, Møre og Romsdal
- Municipalities: Oppdal Municipality, Sunndal Municipality

Physical characteristics
- Source: Dovrefjell mountains
  - location: Drivdalen, Trøndelag
  - coordinates: 62.2966°N 09.58055°E
  - elevation: 891 metres (2,923 ft)
- Mouth: Sunndalsfjorden
  - location: Sunndalsøra, Møre og Romsdal
  - coordinates: 62.6764°N 08.54502°E
  - elevation: 0 metres (0 ft)
- Length: 150 km (93 mi)
- Basin size: 1,511 km^{2} (583 sq mi)

Basin features
- River system: Driva

The Driva river runs through Trøndelag and Møre og Romsdal counties in Norway. The headwaters lie in the Dovrefjell mountains in the south, from where it flows northward, downward through the Drivdalen valley in Oppdal Municipality. When the river gets to the village of Oppdal, it turns westward and heads down the Sunndalen valley to the Sunndalsfjorden at the village of Sunndalsøra in Sunndal Municipality. Some of the other villages along the river include Grøa, Hoelsand, Lønset, and Vognillan. The Norwegian National Road 70 follows the river for most of its course.

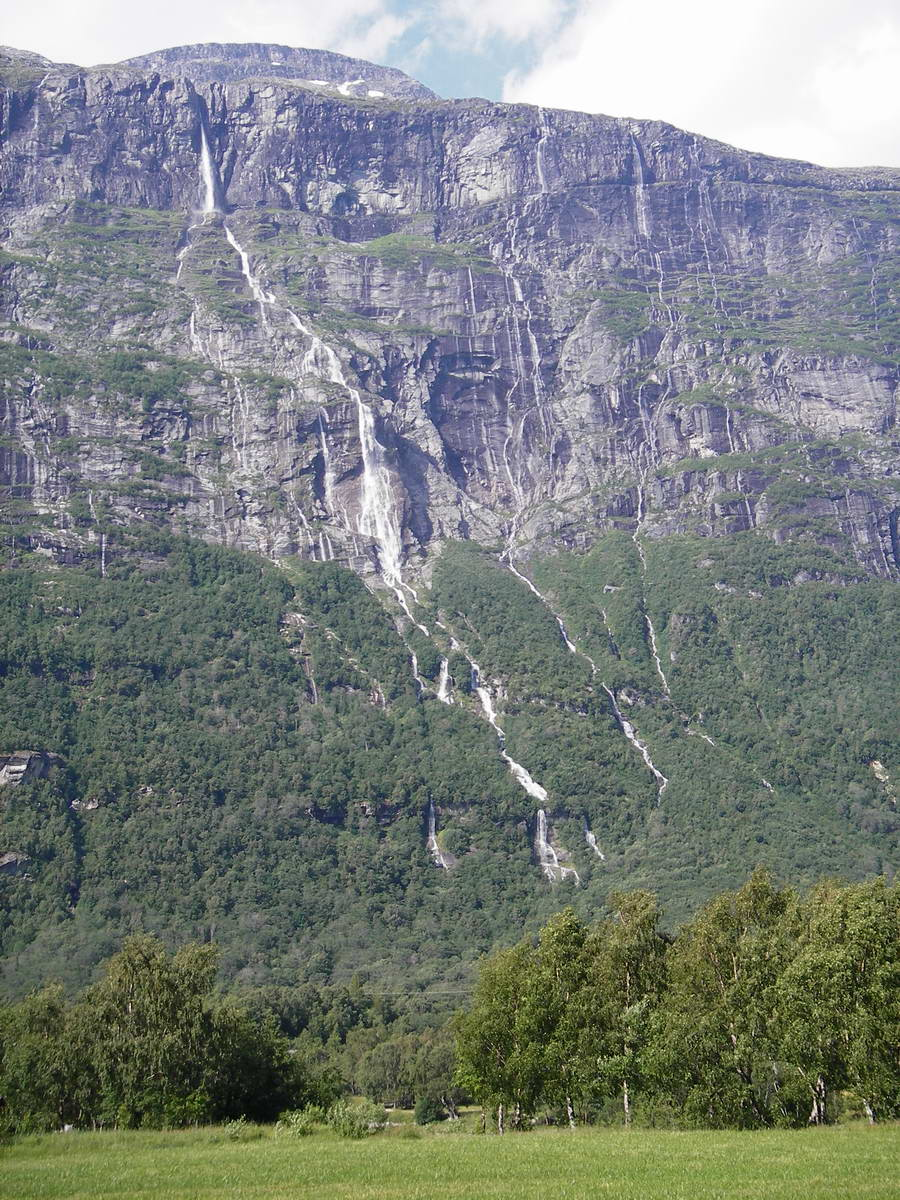
Vinnufossen (waterfall); the Vinnu river is a tributary to Driva.

Many of the tributaries on the west side of the Oppdal valley are dry since the waters in reservoirs formed from the many mountain lakes in that region flow in pipes through the mountain to the Driva hydroelectric power station at Fale in Sunndal Municipality. The largest lake in the reservoir system is Gjevillvatnet which is about 20 kilometres (12 mi) long and about 1 kilometre (0.62 mi) wide.

== History ==
Before the last ice age, the river Driva drained northwards from Oppdal and joined the Orkla river. The uppermost part of the river in the Sunndalen valley which included the tributaries from the lake Gjevilvatnet, Dindalen, and Storlidalen then drained eastwards to Oppdal and joined the older Driva there. The ice age changed the course of the Driva and today, these three tributaries still flow eastwards until they meet the (now) westward-flowing Driva.

Pilgrims followed the Driva on their way to the St. Olav shrine in Trondheim during the Middle Ages. As a result of the heavy stream of pilgrims who followed the Pilgrim's Route prior to the Reformation, king Øystein erected mountain stations where the pilgrims could find food and shelter. Kongsvoll, located along the Driva River in the upper Drivdalen valley, was one of these stations, another was Drivstua (no).

== Angling ==
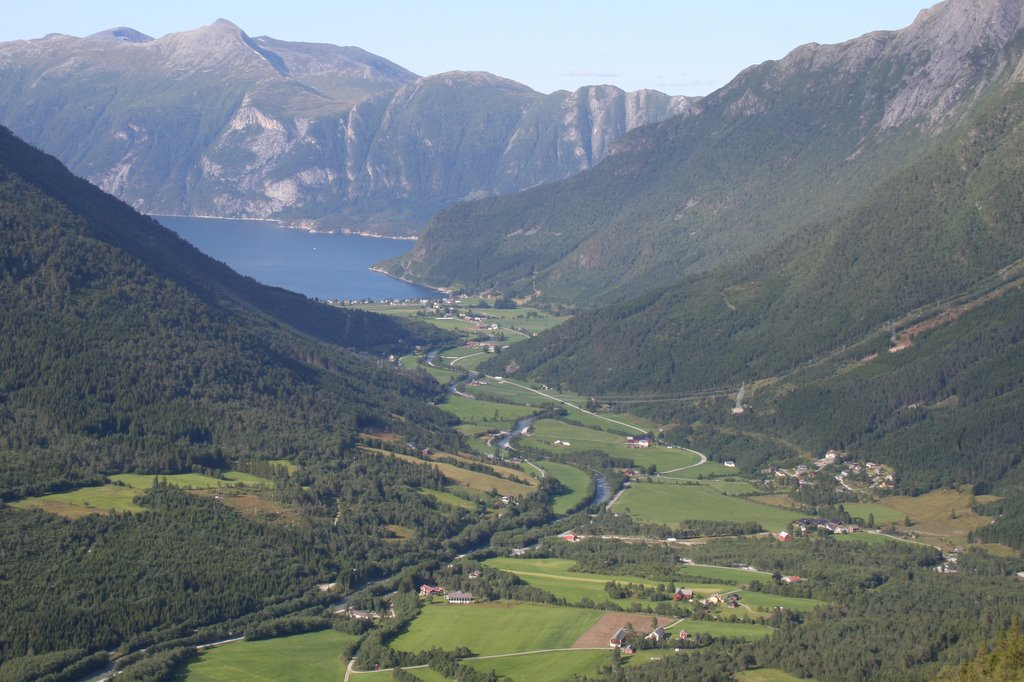
The river runs slowly the last kilometer to the fjord

The Driva was formerly an excellent salmon river, but the parasite Gyrodactylus salaris has decimated the salmon stock. It is an excellent sea trout river, usually ranked number 1 or 2 in all of Norway, by total catch. Salmon and sea trout migrate up to Mågålaupet (approximately 80 kilometres or 50 miles) and at optimal water discharge probably even further. Especially for sea trout this is an unusually long migration, although the majority of trout in Driva do not wander so far.

The only tributary with a run of anadromous fish is the Grøvu, a river that enters from the south/west soon after Driva has reached the Sunndalen valley. Grøvu is also Driva's biggest tributary, and well known for the "Åmotan", a part of the Grøvu valley where 5 rivers meet, 3 of them coming down dramatic waterfalls. Grøvu is also world-famous for extreme kayaking or river rafting.
